= Kingdom of the Suebi =

409–585 Germanic kingdom in northwestern Iberia

Kingdom of the Suebi Regnum Suevorum (Latin)
- 409–585
- Greatest extent of the Suebian Kingdom (green) c. 455 AD
- Capital: Braga
- Common languages: Suebi (spoken among elite); Latin (administrative/liturgical)
- Religion: Germanic paganism (initially among elite and rural); Arianism (mostly among elite); Chalcedonian Christianity (among commoners)
- Government: Monarchy
- King
  - 409–438: Hermeric
  - 585: Malaric
- Historical era: Late Antiquity
  - Suebian leader Hermeric conquers Gallaecia: 409
  - Conquest by the King Leovigild of the Visigothic Kingdom: 585
Preceded by	Succeeded by
Western Roman Empire	Visigothic Kingdom
- Today part of: Gibraltar; Spain; Portugal

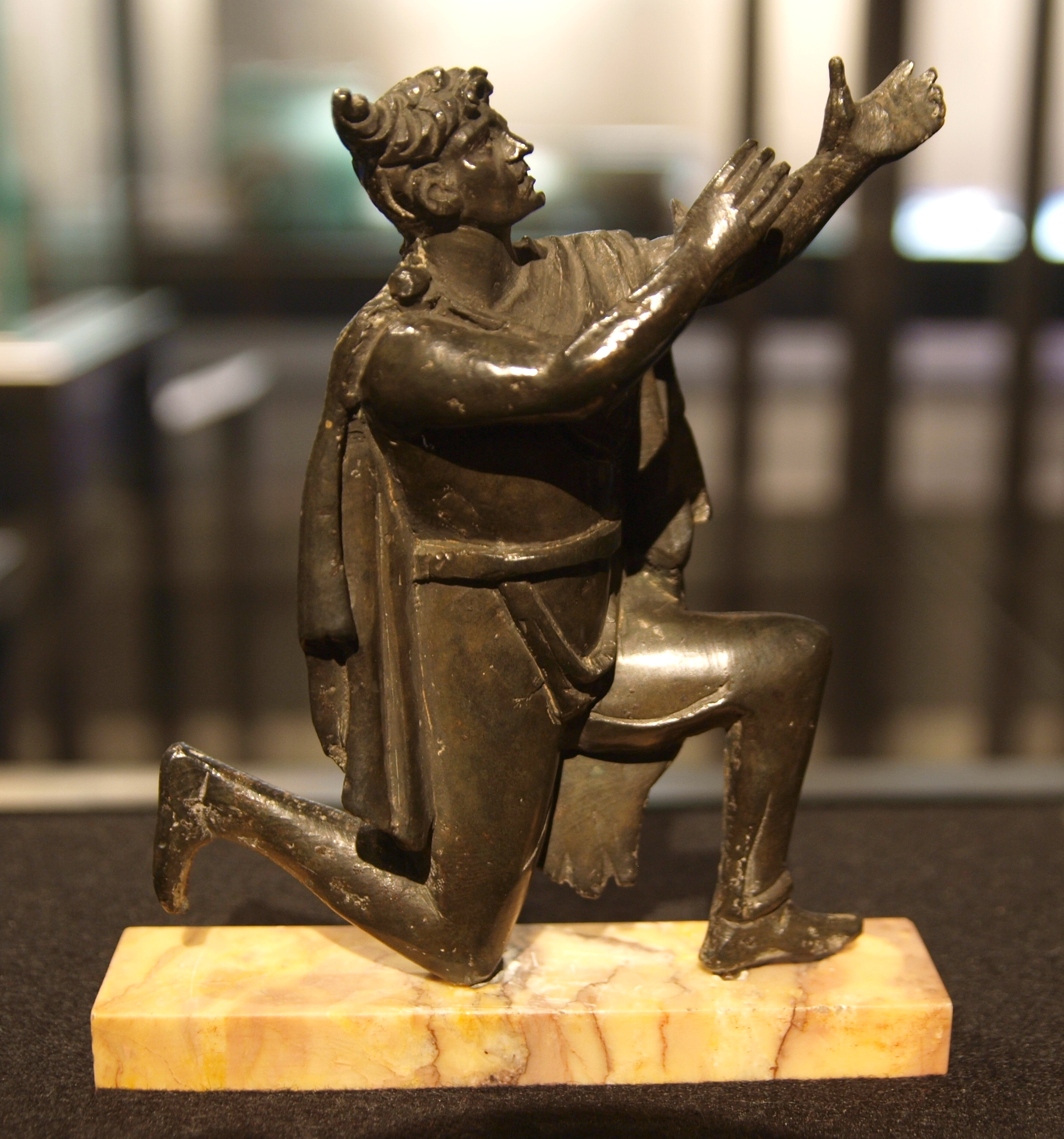
Roman bronze figure representing a Germanic man wearing a typical Suebian knot hairstyle and a characteristic cloak. 2nd half 1st century to 1st half 2nd century AD National Library in Paris, France.

The Kingdom of the Suebi (Latin: Regnum Suevorum), also called the Kingdom of Galicia (Latin: Regnum Galicia) or Suebi Kingdom of Galicia (Latin: Galicia suevorum regnum), was a Germanic post-Roman kingdom that was one of the first to separate from the Roman Empire. Based in the former Roman provinces of Gallaecia and northern Lusitania, the de facto kingdom was established by the Suebi about 409, and during the 6th century it became a formally declared kingdom identifying with Gallaecia. It maintained its independence until 585, when it was annexed by the Visigoths, and was turned into the sixth province of the Visigothic Kingdom in Hispania.

== History ==
=== Origins ===
Little is known about the Suebi who crossed the Rhine on the night of 31 December 405 AD and entered the Roman Empire. It is speculated that these Suevi are the same group as the Quadi, who are mentioned in early writings as living north of the middle Danube, in what is now lower Austria and western Slovakia, and who played an important part in the Germanic Wars of the 2nd century, when, allied with the Marcomanni, they fought fiercely against the Romans under Marcus Aurelius. The main reason behind the identification of the Suevi and Quadi as the same group comes from a letter written by St. Jerome to Ageruchia, listing the invaders who were in Gaul in 409, in which the Quadi are listed and the Suevi are not. The argument for this theory, however, is based solely on the disappearance of the Quadi in the text and the emergence of the Suevi, which conflicts with the testimony of other contemporary authors, such as Orosius, who did indeed cite the Suevi among the peoples traversing the Rhine in 406, and side by side with Quadi, Marcomanni, Vandals and Sarmatians in another passage. Sixth century authors identified the Sueves of Gallaecia with the Alamanni, or simply with Germans, whilst the 4th century Laterculus Veronensis mentions some Suevi side by side with Alamanni, Quadi, Marcomanni and other Germanic peoples.

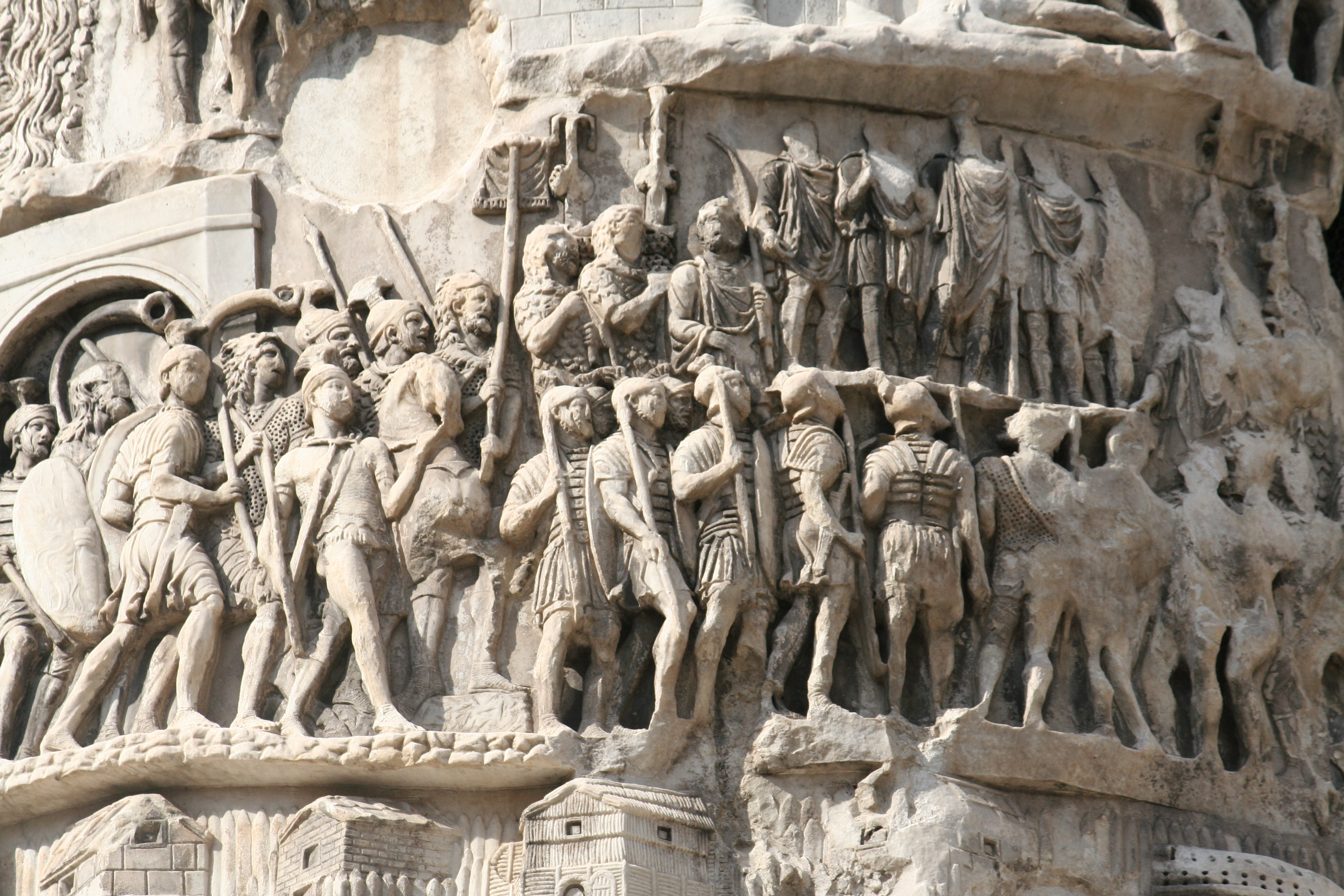
Detail of the Column of Marcus Aurelius, built during this emperor's reign on the occasion of the triumph over, among other peoples, the Suevic tribes of Marcomanni and Quadi in the year 176. Piazza Colonna (Rome).

Additionally it has been pointed out that the lack of mention of the Suevi could mean that they were not per se an older distinct ethnic group, but the result of a recent ethnogenesis, with many smaller groups—among them part of the Quadi and Marcomanni—coming together during the migration from the Danube valley to the Iberian Peninsula. Other groups of Sueves are mentioned by Jordanes and other historians as residing by the Danube regions during the 5th and 6th centuries.

Although there is no clearly documented reason behind the migration of 405 , a widely accepted theory is that the migration of the various Germanic peoples west of the Rhine was due to the westward push of the Huns during the late 4th century, which forced the Germanic peoples westward in response to the threat. This theory has created controversy within the academic community, because of the lack of convincing evidence.

Whether displaced by the Huns or not, the Suevi along with the Vandals and Alans crossed the Rhine on the night of 31 December 405. Their entrance into the Roman Empire was at a moment when the Roman West was experiencing a series of invasions and civil wars; between 405 and 406, the Western regions of the empire saw the invasion of Italy by Goths under Radagaisus, as well as a steady stream of usurpers. This allowed the invading barbarians to enter Gaul with little resistance, consequently allowing for the barbarians to cause considerable damage to the northern provinces of Germania Inferior, Belgica Prima, and Belgica Secunda before the empire saw them as a threat. In response to the barbarian invasion of Gaul, the usurper Constantine III halted the masses of Vandals, Alans, and Sueves, confining them to northern Gaul. But in the spring of 409, Gerontius led a revolt in Hispania and set up his own emperor, Maximus. Constantine, who had recently been elevated to the title of Augustus, set off to Hispania to deal with the rebellion. Gerontius responded by stirring up the barbarians in Gaul against Constantine, convincing them to mobilize again, and, in the summer of 409, the Vandals, Alans, and Suevi began pushing south towards Hispania.

=== Settlement and integration ===
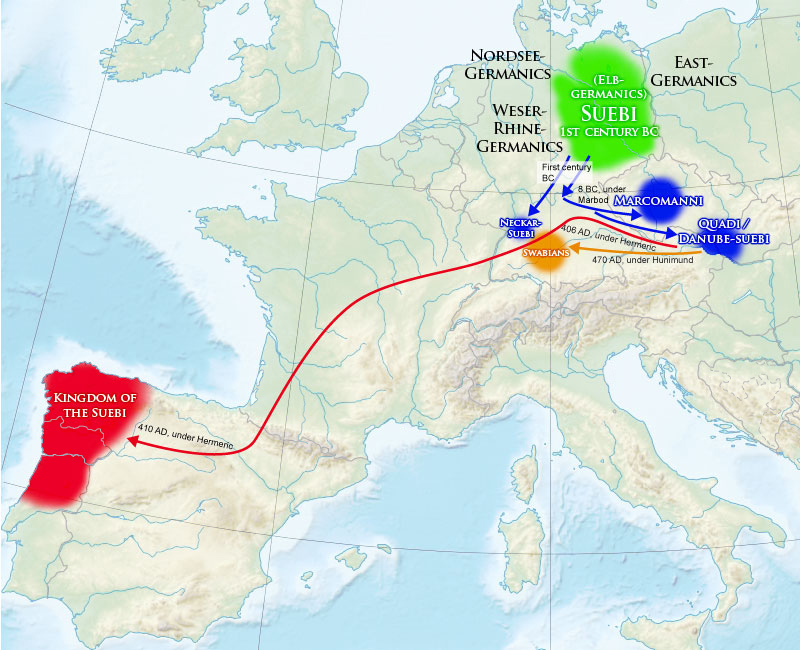
Suebic migrations across Europe ultimately spearheaded by Hermeric, founder and first ruler of the Kingdom of the Suebi in the northwest of the Iberian Peninsula (part of modern-day Portugal and Spain).

The civil war that erupted in the Iberian Peninsula between the forces of Constantine and Gerontius left the passes through the Pyrenees either purposely or inadvertently neglected, leaving southern Gaul and the Iberian Peninsula vulnerable to barbarian attack. Hydatius documents that the crossing into the Iberian Peninsula by the Vandals, Alans, and Suevi took place on either 28 September or 12 October 409. Some scholars take the two dates as the beginning and the end of the crossing of the formidable Pyrenees by scores of thousands, since this could not have been accomplished in one day. Hydatius writes that upon entering Hispania, the barbarian peoples, and even the Roman soldiers, spent 409–410 in a frenzy, plundering food and goods from the cities and countryside, which caused a famine that, according to Hydatius, forced the locals to resort to cannibalism: "[driven] by hunger human beings devoured human flesh; mothers too feasted upon the bodies of their own children whom they had killed and cooked with their own hands."

In 411 the various barbarian groups brokered a peace and divided the provinces of Hispania among themselves sorte, "by lot". Many scholars believe that the reference to "lot" may be to the sortes, "allotments," which barbarian federates received from the Roman government, which suggests that the Suevi and the other invaders had signed a treaty with Maximus. There is, however, no concrete evidence of any treaties between the Romans and the barbarians: Hydatius never mentions any treaty, and states that the peace in 411 was brought about by the compassion of the Lord, while Orosius asserts that the kings of the Vandals, Alans and Sueves were actively pursuing a pact similar to that of the Visigoths at a later date. The division of the land among the four barbarian groups went as such: the Siling Vandals settled in Hispania Baetica, the Alans were allotted the provinces of Lusitania and Hispania Carthaginensis, and the Hasding Vandals and the Suevi shared the northwestern province of Gallaecia.

The division of Gallaecia between the Suevi and the Hasding Vandals placed the Suevi in the west of the province, by the Atlantic Ocean shores, most probably in lands now between the cities of Porto in Portugal, in the south, and Pontevedra in Galicia, in the north. Soon Braga would become their capital, and their domain later expanded into Astorga, and in the region of Lugo and in the valley of the Minho river, with no evidence suggesting that the Suevi inhabited any other cities in the province prior to 438. The initial relation between Gallaeci and Suevi were not as calamitous as sometimes suggested, as Hydatius mentions no conflict among the locals between 411 and 430. Furthermore, Orosius affirmed that the newcomers "turned their swords into ploughs" once they received their new lands.

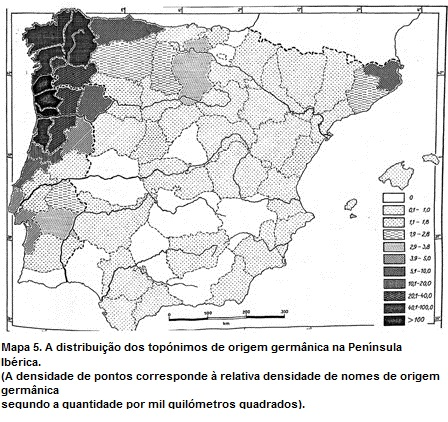
Distribution of Germanic place names across the Iberian peninsula. Darker shades indicate higher concentration.

The Suebi spoke a Germanic language and classical sources refer to a Suebian language. In particular, the Suebi are associated with the concept of an "Elbe Germanic" group of early dialects spoken by the Irminones, entering Germany from the east, and originating on the Baltic. In late classical times, these dialects, by now situated to the south of the Elbe, and stretching across the Danube into the Roman empire, experienced the High German consonant shift that defines modern High German languages, and in its most extreme form, Upper German. Based on some toponymical data, another Germanic group accompanied the Suebi and settled in Portugal, the Buri in the region between the rivers Cávado and Homem, the area known as Terras de Bouro (Lands of the Buri), named Burio until the High Middle Ages.

=== The kingdom during the 5th century ===
==== King Hermeric ====
In 416, the Visigoths entered the Iberian Peninsula, sent by the emperor of the West to fight off the barbarians arriving in 409. By 418, the Visigoths, led by their king, Wallia, had devastated both the Siling Vandals and Alans, leaving the Hasding Vandals and the Suevi, undisturbed by Wallia's campaign, as the two remaining forces in the Iberian Peninsula. In 419, after the departure of the Visigoths to their new lands in Aquitania, a conflict arose between the Vandals under Gunderic, and the Suevi, led by king Hermeric. Both armies met in the Battle of the Nerbasius mountains, but the intervention of Roman forces commanded by the comes Hispaniarum Asterius ended the conflict by attacking the Vandals and forcing them to move to Baetica, in modern Andalusia, leaving the Suevi in virtually sole possession of the whole province.

In 429, as the Vandals were preparing their departure to Africa, a Swabian warlord named Heremigarius moved to Lusitania to plunder it, but was confronted by the new Vandal king Gaiseric. Heremigarius drowned in the river Guadiana while retreating; this is the first instance of an armed Suebi action outside the provincial limits of Gallaecia. Then, after the Vandals left for Africa, the Swabians were the only barbarian entity left in Hispania.

King Hermeric spent the remainder of his years solidifying Suevic rule over the entire province of Gallaecia. In 430 he broke the old peace maintained with the locals, sacking central Gallaecia, although the barely romanised Gallaeci, who were reoccupying old Iron Age hill forts, managed to force a new peace, which was sealed with the interchange of prisoners. However, new hostilities broke out in 431 and 433. In 433 king Hermeric sent a local bishop, Symphosius, as ambassador, this being the first evidence for collaboration between Sueves and locals. However, it was not until 438 that an enduring peace, which would last for twenty years, was reached in the province.

==== King Rechila ====
King Rechila's shortlived conquests (438-448).

In 438 Hermeric became ill. Having annexed the entirety of the former Roman province of Gallaecia, he made peace with the local population, and retired, leaving his son Rechila as king of the Sueves. Rechila saw an opportunity for expansion and began pushing to other areas of the Iberian Peninsula. In the same year he campaigned in Baetica, defeating in open battle the Romanae militiae dux Andevotus by the banks of the Genil river, capturing a large treasure. A year later, in 439, the Sueves invaded Lusitania and entered into its capital, Mérida, which briefly became the new capital of their kingdom. Rechila continued with the expansion of the kingdom, and by 440 he fruitfully besieged and forced the surrender of a Roman official, comes Censorius, in the strategic city of Mértola. Next year, in 441, the armies of Rechila conquered Seville, just months after the death of the old king Hermeric, who had ruled his people for more than thirty years. With the conquest of Seville, capital of Baetica, the Suevi managed to control Baetica and Carthaginensis. It has been said, however, that the Suevi conquest of Baetica and Carthaginensis was limited to raids, and Suevi presence, if any, was minute.

In 446, the Romans dispatched to the provinces of Baetica and Carthaginensis the magister utriusque militiae Vitus, who, assisted by a large number of Goths, attempted to subdue the Suevi and restore imperial administration in Hispania. Rechila met and defeated the Goths; Vitus fled in disgrace and no more imperial attempts were made to retake Hispania. In 448, Rechila died as a pagan, leaving the crown to his son, Rechiar.

==== King Rechiar ====
Timeline of the Suebic Kings

Rechiar, a Catholic Christian, succeeded his father in 448, being the first Germanic king who professed Nicene Christianity as well as the first one to mint coins in his own name. Some believe minting the coins was a sign of Suevi autonomy, due to the use of minting in the late empire as a declaration of independence. Hoping to follow the successful careers of his father and his grandfather, Rechiar made a series of bold political moves throughout his reign. The first one was his marriage to the daughter of the Gothic king Theodoric I in 448, so improving the relationship between the two peoples. He also led a number of successful plundering campaigns to Vasconia, Zaragoza and Lleida, in Hispania Tarraconensis (then the northeastern quarter of the peninsula, stretching from the Mediterranean to the Gulf of Biscay, which was still under Roman rule) sometimes acting in coalition with local bagaudae (local Hispano-Roman insurgents). In Lleida he also captured prisoners, who were taken as serfs back to the Sueves' lands in Gallaecia and Lusitania. Rome then sent an ambassador to the Sueves, obtaining some concessions, but in 455 the Sueves plundered lands in Carthaginensis which had been previously returned to Rome. In response, the new emperor Avitus and the Visigoths sent a joint embassy, remembering that the peace established with Rome was also granted by the Goths. But Rechiar launched two new campaigns in Tarraconensis, in 455 and 456, returning to Galicia with large numbers of prisoners.

The emperor Avitus finally responded to Rechiar's defiance in the autumn of 456, sending the Visigoth king Theodoric II over the Pyrenees and into Gallaecia, at the head of a large army of foederati which also included the Burgundian kings Gundioc and Hilperic. The Suevi mobilized and both armies met on 5 October, by the river Órbigo near Astorga. Theoderic II's Goths, on the right wing, defeated the Suevi. While many Sueves were killed in the battle, and many others were captured, most managed to flee. King Rechiar fled wounded in the direction of the coast, pursued by the Gothic army, which entered and plundered Braga on 28 October. King Rechiar was later captured in Porto while trying to embark, and was executed in December. Theodoric continued his war on the Suevi for three months, but in April 459 he returned to Gaul, alarmed by the political and military movements of the new emperor, Majorian, and of the magister militum Ricimer—a half-Sueve, maybe a kinsman of Rechiar—while his allies and the rest of the Goths sacked Astorga, Palencia and other places, on their way back to the Pyrenees.

==== Competing kings ====
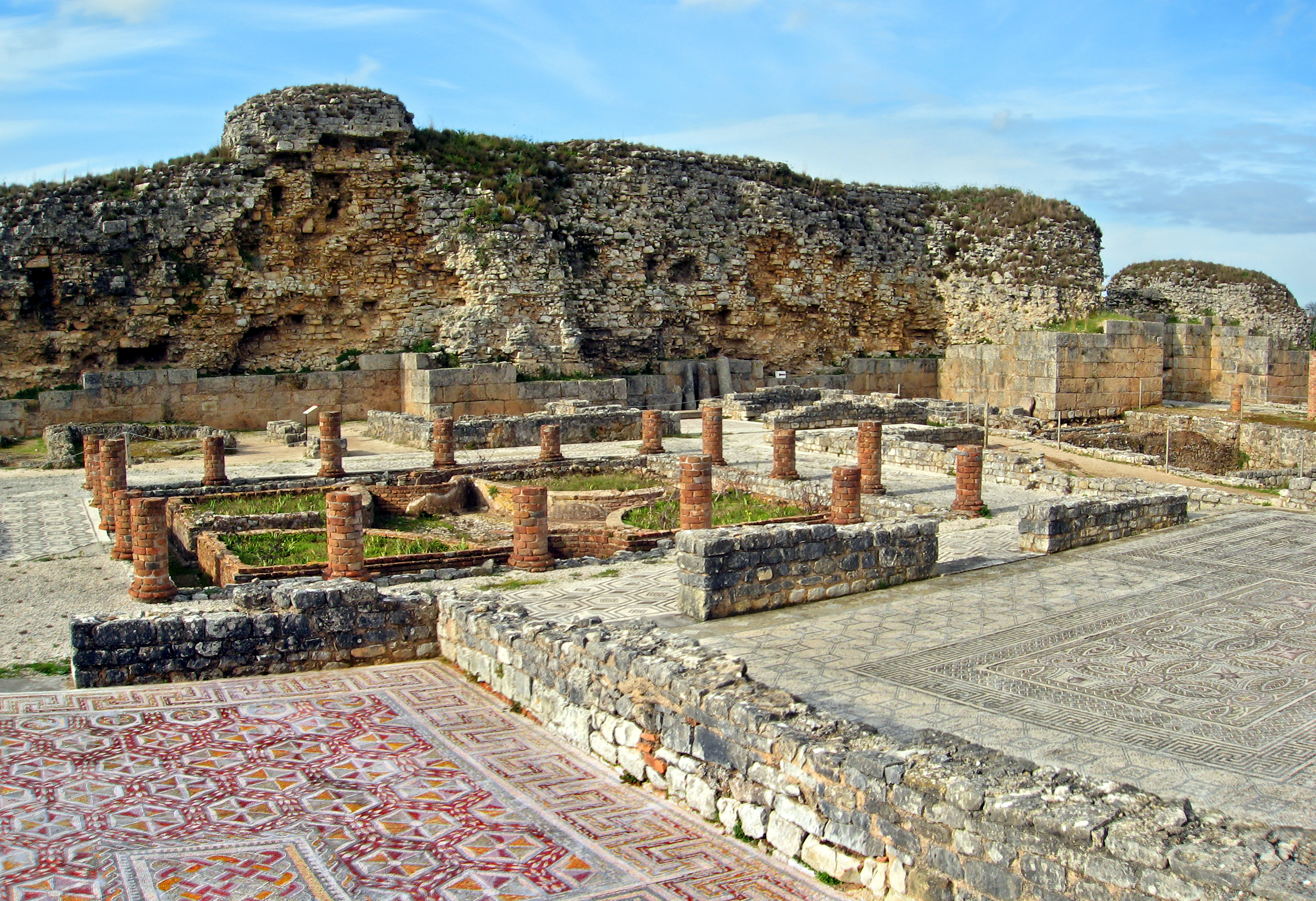
The Roman city of Conimbriga was abandoned after being assaulted by the Suevi in 468

When the Visigoths disposed of Rechiar, the royal bloodline of Hermeric vanished and the conventional mechanism for Suevi leadership died with it. In 456, one Aioulf took over the leadership of the Sueves. The origins behind Aioulf's ascension are not clear: Hydatius wrote that Aioulf was a Goth deserter, while the historian Jordanes wrote that he was a Warni appointed by Theodoric to govern Gallaecia, and that he was persuaded by the Suevi into this adventure. Either way, he was killed in Porto in June 457, but his rebellion, together with the armed actions of Majorian against the Visigoths, eased the pressure on the Suevi.

In 456, the same year as the execution of Rechiar, Hydatius stated that "the Sueves set up Maldras as their king." This statement suggests that the Suevi as a people may have had a voice in the selection of a new ruler. The election of Maldras would lead to a schism among the Suevi, as some followed another king, named Framta, who died just a year later. Both factions then sought peace with the local Gallaeci.

In 458 the Goths again sent an army into Hispania, which arrived in Baetica in July, thereby depriving the Sueves of this province. This field army stayed in Iberia for several years.

In 460 Maldras was killed, after a reign of four years during which he plundered Sueves and Romans alike, in Lusitania and in the south of Gallaecia past the valley of the Douro river. Meanwhile, the Sueves in the north chose another leader, Richimund, who plundered Gallaecia in 459 and 460. This same year they captured the walled city of Lugo, which was still under the authority of a Roman official. As a response, the Goths sent their army to punish the Suevi who dwelt in the outskirts of the city and nearby regions, but their campaign was revealed by some locals, whom Hydatius considered traitors. From that very moment Lugo became an important centre for the Sueves, and was used as capital by Rechimund.

In the south Frumar succeeded Maldras and his faction, but his death in 464 closed a period of internal dissent among the Sueves, and permanent conflict with the native Gallaecian population.

==== King Remismund ====
In 464, Remismund, an ambassador who had travelled between Gallaecia and Gaul on several occasions, became King. Remismund was able to unite the factions of Suevi under his rule, and at the same time restore peace. He was also recognized, perhaps even approved of, by Theodoric, who sent him gifts and weapons along with a wife. Under the leadership of Remismund, the Suevi would again raid the nearby countries, plundering the lands of Lusitania and the Conventus Asturicense, whilst still fighting Gallaeci tribes like the Aunonenses, who refused to submit to Remismund. In 468 they managed to destroy part of the walls of Conímbriga, in Lusitania, which was sacked and then mostly abandoned after the inhabitants fled or were taken back to the north as slaves. The next year they captured Lisbon, which was surrendered by its leader, Lusidio. He later became ambassador of the Suevi to the Emperor. The end of the chronicle of Hydatius in 468 doesn't let us know the later fate of Remismund.

The Suevi probably remained mostly pagan until an Arian missionary named Ajax, sent by the Visigothic king Theodoric II at the request of the Suebic unifier Remismund, converted them in 466 and established a lasting Arian church which dominated the people until their conversion to Catholicism in the 560s.

=== The Arian period ===
Little is known of the period between 470 and 550, beyond the testimony of Isidore of Seville, who in the 7th century wrote that many kings reign during this time, all of them Arians. A medieval document named Divisio Wambae mentions one king named Theodemund, otherwise unknown. Other less reliable and very posterior chronicles mention the reign of several kings under the names of Hermeneric II, Rechila II and Rechiar II.

More trustworthy is a stone inscription found in Vairão Portugal, recording the foundation of a church by a Benedictine nun, in 535, under the rule of one Veremund who is addressed as the most serene king Veremund, although this inscription has also been attributed to king Bermudo II of León. Also, thanks to a letter sent by Pope Vigilius to the bishop Profuturus of Braga circa 540, it is known that a certain number of Catholic Orthodox had converted to Arianism, and that some Catholic Orthodox churches had been demolished in the past in unspecified circumstances.

=== Conversion to Catholic Orthodoxy ===
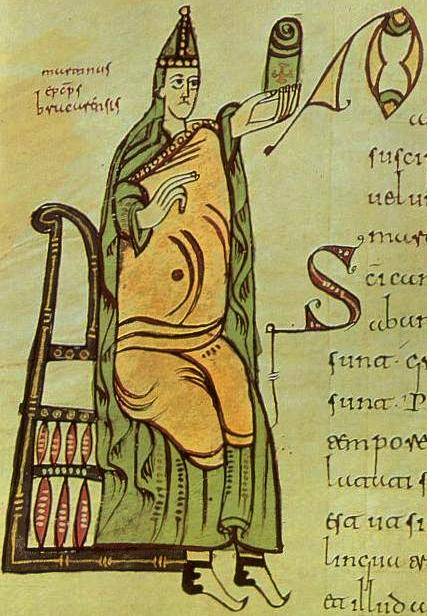
Image of St Martin of Braga, (c.510 - 580). Codex Vigilanus or Albeldensis, Escurial library

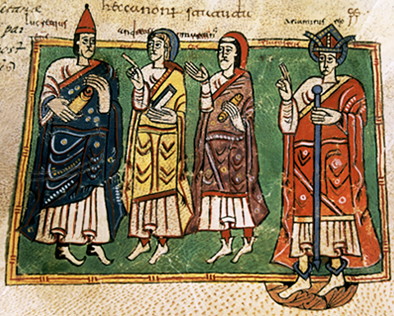
King Ariamir with the bishops Lucrecio, Andrew, and Martin, during the first Council of Braga. Codex Vigilanus or Albeldensis, Escurial library

The conversion of the Suebi to Orthodoxy is presented very differently in the primary sources. A contemporary record, the minutes of the First Council of Braga—which met on 1 May 561—state explicitly that the synod was held at the orders of a king named Ariamir. While his Orthodoxy is not in doubt, that he was the first Orthodox monarch of the Suebes since Rechiar has been contested on the grounds that he is not explicitly stated to have been. He was, however, the first to hold an Orthodox synod. On the other hand, the Historia Suevorum of Isidore of Seville states that it was Theodemar who brought about the conversion of his people from Arianism with the help of the missionary Martin of Braga. And finally, according to the Frankish historian Gregory of Tours, an otherwise unknown sovereign named Chararic, having heard of Martin of Tours, promised to accept the beliefs of the saint if only his son was cured of leprosy. Through the relics and intercession of Saint Martin the son was healed; Chararic and the entire royal household converted to the Nicene faith. As the coming of the relics of Saint Martin of Tours and the conversion of Chararic are made to coincide in the narration with the arrival of Martin of Braga, circa 550, this legend has been interpreted as an allegory of the pastoral work of Saint Martin of Braga, and of his devotion to Saint Martin of Tours.

Most scholars have attempted to meld these stories. It has been alleged that Chararic and Theodemar must have been successors of Ariamir, since Ariamir was the first Suebic monarch to lift the ban on Orthodox synods; Isidore therefore gets the chronology wrong. Reinhart suggested that Chararic was converted first through the relics of Saint Martin and that Theodemar was converted later through the preaching of Martin of Braga.

Dahn equated Chararic with Theodemar, even saying that the latter was the name he took upon baptism. It has also been suggested that Theodemar and Ariamir were the same person and the son of Chararic. In the opinion of some historians, Chararic is nothing more than an error on the part of Gregory of Tours and never existed. If, as Gregory relates, Martin of Braga died about the year 580 and had been bishop for about thirty years, then the conversion of Chararic must have occurred around 550 at the latest. Finally, Ferreiro believes the conversion of the Suevi was progressive and stepwise and that Chararic's public conversion was only followed by the lifting of a ban on Orthodox synods in the reign of his successor, which would have been Ariamir; while Theodemar would have been responsible for beginning a persecution of the Arians in his kingdom, to root out their heresy.

Finally, the Suebic conversion is ascribed not to a Suebe, but to a Visigoth, by the chronicler John of Biclarum. He put their conversion alongside that of the Goths, occurring under Reccared I in 587–589, but, as such, this corresponds to a later time, when the kingdom was undergoing its integration with the Visigothic kingdom.

=== 6th century and annexation ===
==== Britons ====
Sometime late in the 5th century or early in the sixth century, a group of Romano-Britons escaping the Anglo-Saxons settled in the north of the Suebi Kingdom of Gallæcia in lands which subsequently acquired the name Britonia. Most of what is known about the settlement comes from ecclesiastical sources; records from the 572 Second Council of Braga refer to a diocese called the Britonensis ecclesia ("British church") and an episcopal see called the sedes Britonarum ("See of the Britons"), while the administrative and ecclesiastical document usually known as Divisio Theodemiri or Parochiale suevorum, attribute to them their own churches and the monastery Maximi, likely the monastery of Santa Maria de Bretoña. The bishop representing this diocese at the II Council of Braga bore the Brythonic name Maeloc. The see continued to be represented at several councils through the 7th century.

==== King Ariamir and king Theodemar ====
On 1 May 561, king Ariamir, who was in the third year of his reign, called the First Council of Braga, being styled The most glorious king Ariamir in the acts. The first Orthodox Council held in the Kingdom, it was almost entirely devoted to the condemnation of Priscillianism, making no mention at all of Arianism, and only once reproving clerics for adorning his clothes and for wearing granos, a Germanic word implying either pigtails, long beard, moustache, or a Suebian knot, a custom declared pagan. Of the eight assistant bishops only one bore a Germanic name, bishop Ilderic.

Later, on 1 January 569, Ariamir's successor, Theodemar, held a council in Lugo, which dealt with the administrative and ecclesiastical organization of the Kingdom. At his request, the Kingdom of Gallaecia was divided in two provinces or synods, under the obedience of the metropolitans Braga and Lugo, and thirteen episcopal sees, some of them new, for which new bishops were ordered, others old: Iria Flavia, Britonia, Astorga, Ourense and Tui in the north, under the obedience of Lugo; and Dume, Porto, Viseu, Lamego, Coimbra and Idanha-a-Velha in the south, dependent of Braga. Each see was then further divided into smaller territories, named ecclesiae and pagi. The election of Lugo as metropolitan of the north was due to its central situation in relation to its dependant sees and that city.

==== King Miro ====
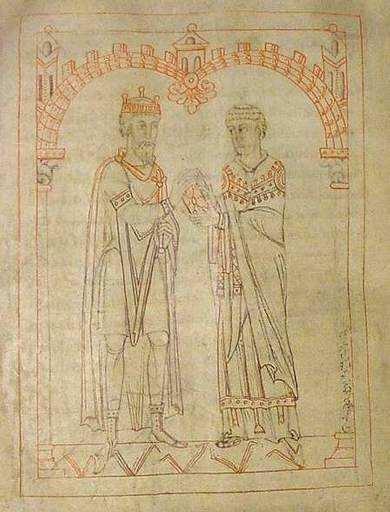
Miro, king of Gallaecia, and Saint Martin of Braga, from an 1145 manuscript of Martin's Formula Vitae Honestae, now in the Austrian National Library. Martin's work was originally addressed to King Miro: "To King Miro, the most glorious and calm, the pious, distinguished for his Catholic faith"

According to John of Biclaro, in 570 Miro succeeded Theodemar as king of the Sueves. During his time, the Suevic kingdom was challenged again by the Visigoths who, under their king Liuvigild, were reconstituting their kingdom, reduced and mostly ruled by foreigners since their defeat by the Franks in the Battle of Vouillé.

In 572 Miro ordered the celebration of the Second Council of Braga, which was presided over by the Pannonian Saint Martin of Braga as archbishop of the Suevi kingdom’s capital. Martin was a cultivated man, praised by Isidore of Seville, Venantius Fortunatus and Gregory of Tours, who led the Sueves to Catholicism and who promoted the cultural and political renaissance of the kingdom. In the acts of the Council, Martin declared the unity and purity of the Catholic faith in Gallaecia and, for the first time, Arius was discredited. Notably, of the twelve assistant bishops, five were Sueves (Nitigius of Lugo, Wittimer of Ourense, Anila of Tui, Remisol of Viseu, Adoric of Idanha-a-Velha), and one was a Briton, Mailoc.

This same year of 572 Miro led an expedition against the Runcones, when the Visigoth king Liuvigild was conducting successful military activity in the south: he had recovered for the Visigoths the cities of Cordova and Medina-Sidonia, and had led a successful assault on the region around the city of Málaga. But from 573 on his campaigns got closer to Suevic lands, first occupying Sabaria, later the Aregenses mountains and Cantabria, where he expelled some invaders. Finally, in 576, he entered Gallaecia itself, disturbing the boundaries of the kingdom, but Miro sent ambassadors and obtained from Liuvigild a temporary peace. It was probably during this period that the Suevi also sent some ambassadors to the Frankish king Gontram, who were intercepted by Chilperic I near Poitiers, and imprisoned for a year, as recorded by Gregory of Tours.

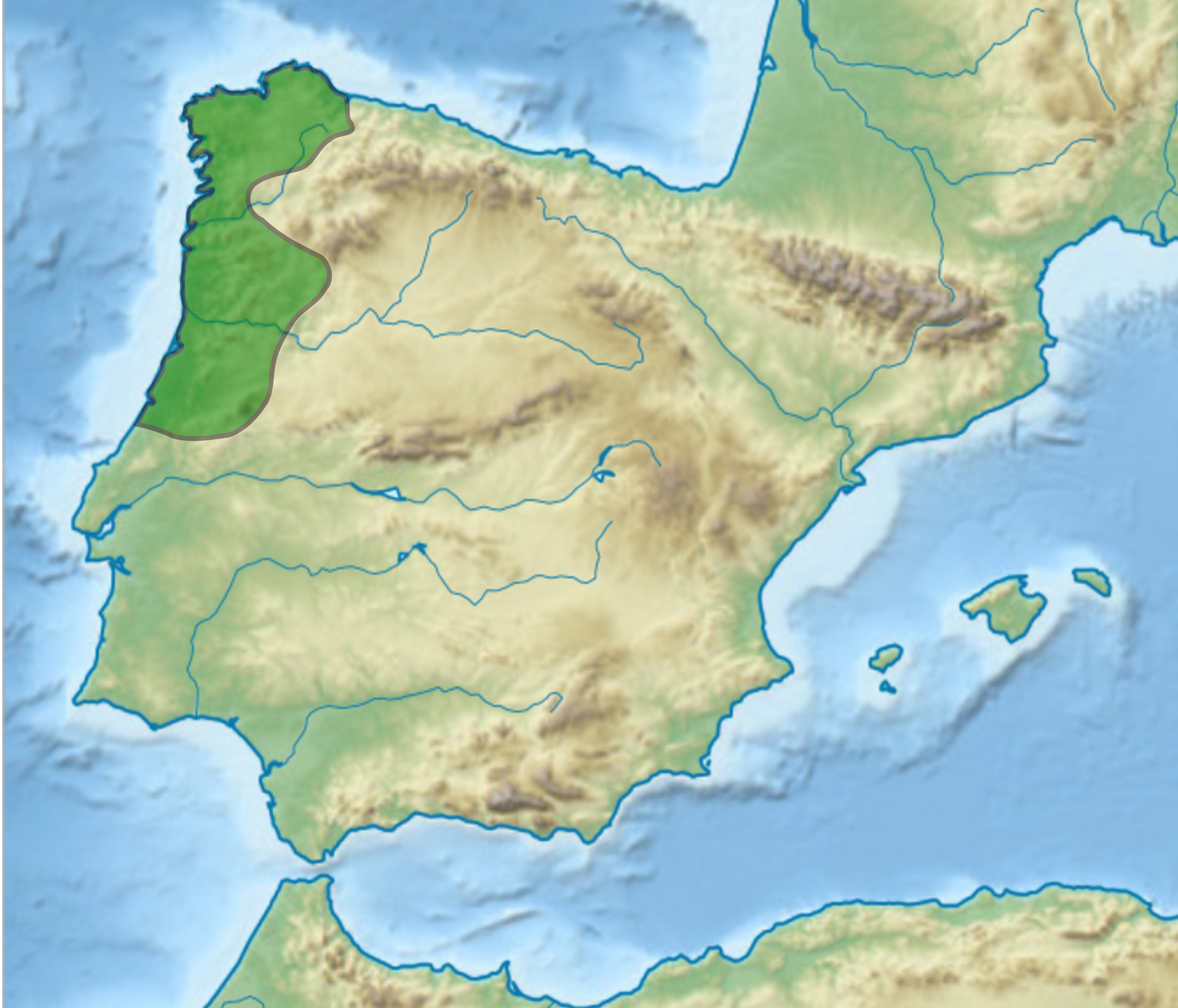
Borders of Suebi Galicia c. 575 after the loss of Ourense and the Aregenses mountains

Later, in 579, Liuvigild's son, prince Hermenegild, rebelled against his father, proclaiming himself king. He, while residing in Seville, had converted to Catholicism under the influence of his wife, the Frankish princess Ingundis, and of Leander of Seville, in open opposition to the Arianism of his father. But it was not until 582 that Liuvigild gathered his armies to attack his son: first, he took Mérida; then, in 583, he marched to Seville. Under siege, Hermenegild's rebellion became dependent on the support offered by the Eastern Roman Empire, which controlled much of the southern coastal regions of Hispania since Justinian I, and by the Sueves. This same year Miro, king of the Gallaecians, marched south with his army, with the intention of breaking through the blockade, but, while camped, he found himself besieged by Liuvigild, and was then forced to sign a treaty of fidelity with the Visigothic king. After exchanging presents, Miro returned to Gallaecia, where he was laid to bed some days later, dying soon after, due to "the bad waters of Spain", according to Gregory of Tours. Hermenegild's rebellion ended in 584, as Liuvigild bribed the Byzantines with 30,000 solidi, thereby depriving his son of their support.

==== Last kings ====
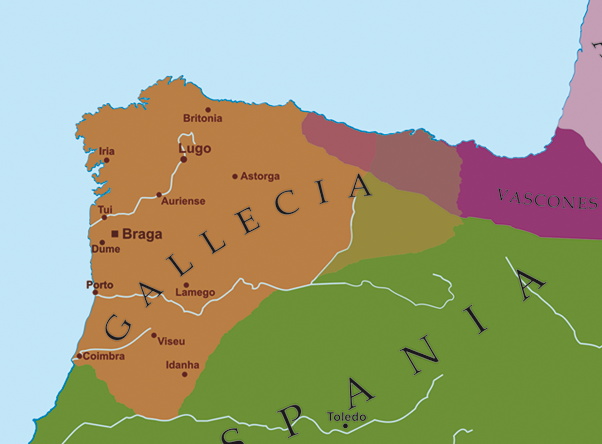
The Suebic Kingdom of Gallaecia, 6th century

On the death of Miro, his son Eburic was made king, but apparently not before sending tokens of appreciation and friendship to Liuvigild. Not a year later his brother-in-law, named Audeca, accompanied by the army, seized power. He took Eburic into a monastery and forced him to ordain as a priest, thereby making him ineligible for the throne. Then Audeca married Siseguntia, king Miro's widow, and made himself king. This usurpation and the friendship granted by Eboric gave Liuvigild the opportunity to seize the neighboring kingdom. In 585 Liuvigild went to war against the Sueves, invading Gallecia. In the words of John of Biclaro: "King Liuvigild devastates Gallaecia and deprives Audeca of the totality of the Kingdom; the nation of the Sueves, their treasure and fatherland are conduced to his own power and turned into a province of the Goths." During the campaign, the Franks of king Guntram attacked Septimania, maybe trying to help the Sueves, at the same time sending ships to Gallaecia which were intercepted by Liuvigild's troops, who took their cargo and killed or enslaved most of their crews. Thus was the kingdom transferred to the Goths as one of their three administrative regions: Gallaecia, Hispania and Gallia Narbonensis. Audeca, captured, was tonsured and forced to take holy orders, then sent into exile in Beja, in Southern Lusitania.

This same year, 585, a man named Malaric rebelled against the Goths and reclaimed the throne, but he was finally defeated and captured by the generals of Liuvigild, who took him in chains to the Visigothic king.

==== Annexation ====
Suebic Gallaecia, Visigothic Hispania and Byzantine Spania, c. 560 AD

After the conquest, king Liuvigild reintroduced the Arian Church among the Sueves, but this was a short-lived institution, because after his death in 586 his son Reccared openly promoted the mass conversion of Visigoths and Sueves to Catholicism. Reccared's plans were opposed by a group of Arian conspirators; its leader, Segga, was exiled to Gallaecia, after his hands were amputated. The conversion occurred during the Third Council of Toledo, with the assistance of seventy-two bishops from Hispania, Gaul and Gallaecia. There, eight bishops renounced their Arianism, among them four Suevi: Argiovittus of Porto, Beccila of Lugo, Gardingus of Tui and Sunnila of Viseu. The mass conversion was celebrated by king Reccared: "Not only the conversion of the Goths is found among the favours that we have received, but also the infinite multitude of the Sueves, whom with divine assistance we have subjected to our realm. Although led into heresy by external fault, with our diligence we have brought them to the origins of truth". He was styled as "King of the Visigoths and of the Suevi" in a letter sent to him by Pope Gregory the Great soon after.

Under the Goths, the administrative apparatus of the Suevi Kingdom was initially maintained —many of the Suevi districts established during the reign of Theodemar are also known as later Visigothic mints— but during the middle years of the seventh century an administrative and ecclesiastical reform led to the disappearance of most of these mints, with the exception of that of the cities of Braga, Lugo and Tui. Also the northern Lusitanian bishoprics of Lamego, Viseu, Coimbra and Idanha-a-Velha, in lands which had been annexed to Gallaecia in the fifth century, were returned to the obedience of Mérida. It has been also pointed out that no visible Gothic immigration took place during the 6th and the 7th century into Gallaecia.

The last mention of the Sueves as a separate people dates to a 10th-century gloss in a Spanish codex: "hanc arbor romani pruni vocant, spani nixum, uuandali et goti et suebi et celtiberi ceruleum dicunt" ("This tree is called plum-tree by the Romans; nixum by the Spaniards; the Vandals, the Sueves, the Goths, and the Celtiberians call it ceruleum").

== Architecture and art ==
Among the major post-Roman barbarian kingdoms, that of the Suebi is perhaps the most culturally and artistically obscure. Compared to the Visigoths in Hispania, the Franks in Gaul, or even the Lombards in Italy, the Suebi left behind remarkably little in the form of art or architecture.

=== Architecture ===
Today, most Suebi-era architectural sites are either destroyed or so heavily renovated to the point where they are only "Suebic" in ancient historic context. Some Suebic sites include:

- The ruins of the Monastery of Dumio in Braga, an early paleo-Christian church constructed by the Suebic king Chararic.
- The Church of Santa María Madre in Ourense, which used to be the site of a Suebic cathedral. Today, the façade still contains Suebi-era marble columns.
- The Church of Cedofeita in Porto, a church that (according to tradition) was originally built by the Suebic king Theodemir.
- The Ourense Cathedral, which was the site of a Suebic church built by king Chararic before destruction by the Moors.
- The Monastery of Santa María de Mezonzo in Vilasantar, which was most likely the site of a Suebic church.
- The Archaeological Station of Santa Marta das Cortiças in Braga, which includes the archeological remains of a Suebic palace.
- The Monastery of San Pedro de Rocas in Esgos, a church which, according to an inscribed tombstone now housed in the Provincial Archaeological Museum of Orense, was home to 5 hermits in 573, chronologically aligning with Suebi political control over the region.
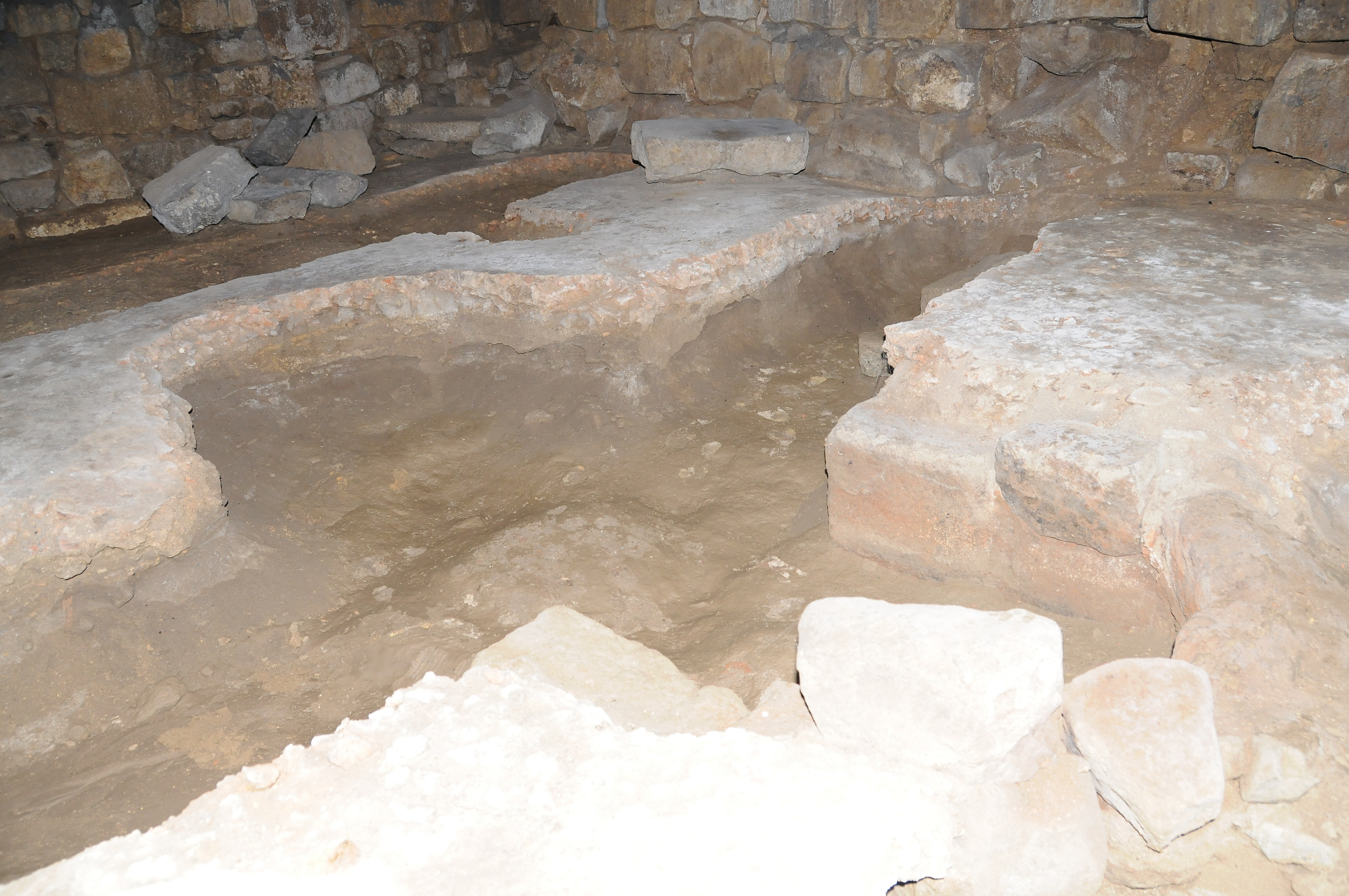
Ruins of the Monastery of Dumio in Braga, an early paleo-Christian church constructed by the Suebic king Chararic.

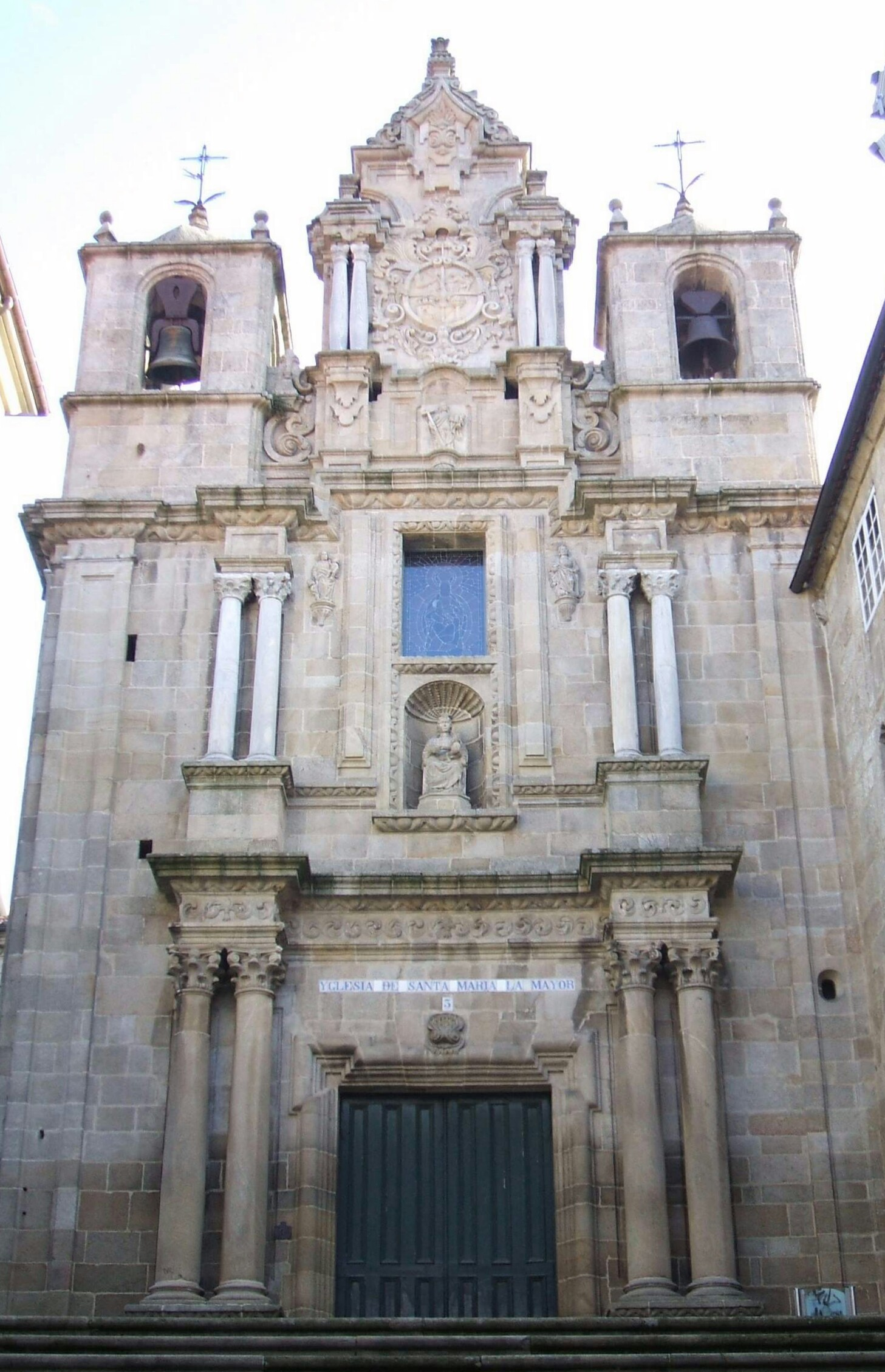
Church of Santa María Madre in Ourense, at the site of a Suebic cathedral. Today, the façade still contains Suebi-era marble columns.

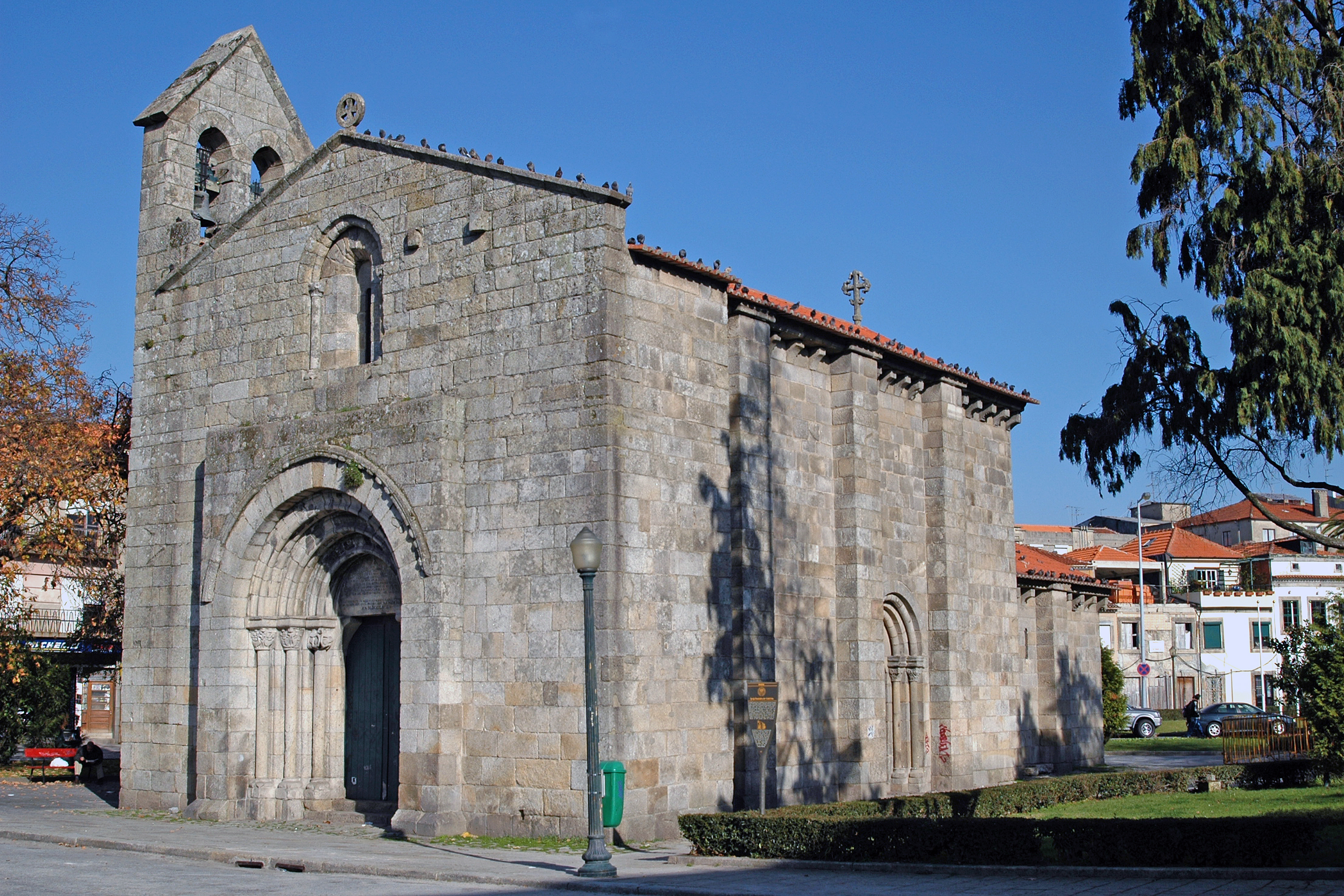
Church of Cedofeita in Porto that (according to tradition) was originally built by the Suebic king Theodemir-

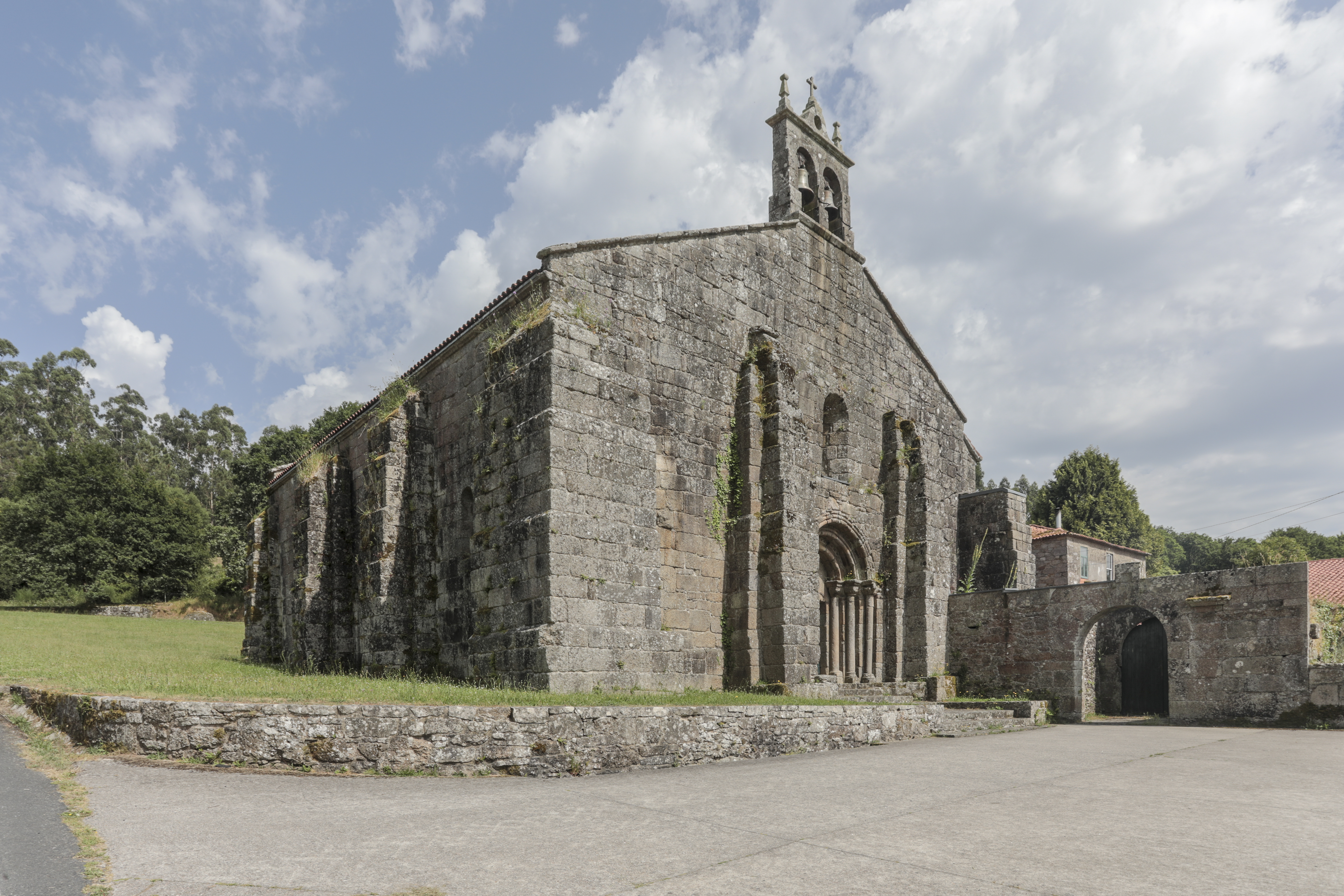
Monastery of Santa María de Mezonzo in Vilasantar, which was most likely the site of a Suebic church.

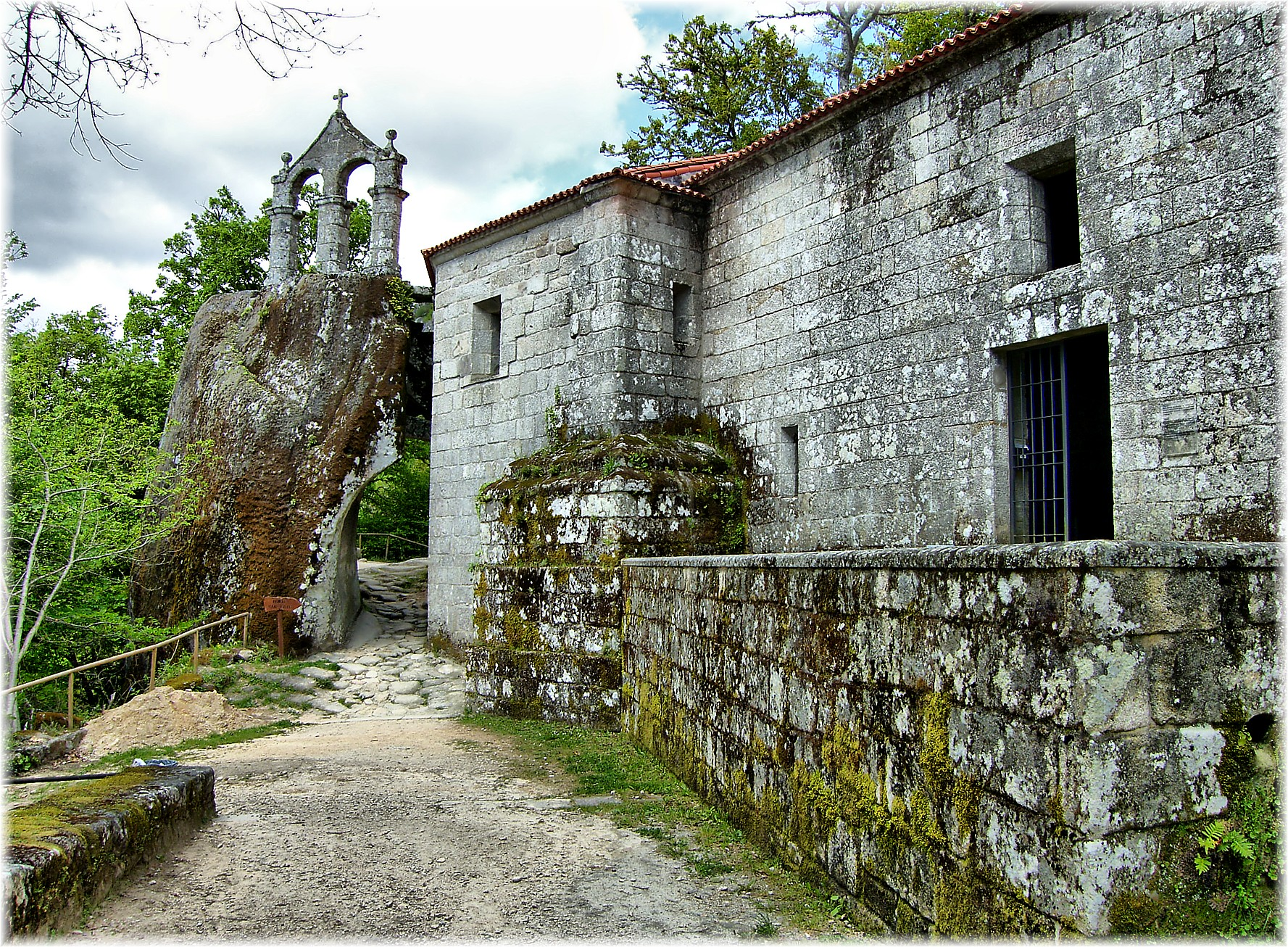
Cave church of San Pedro de Rocas in Esgos.

=== Art ===
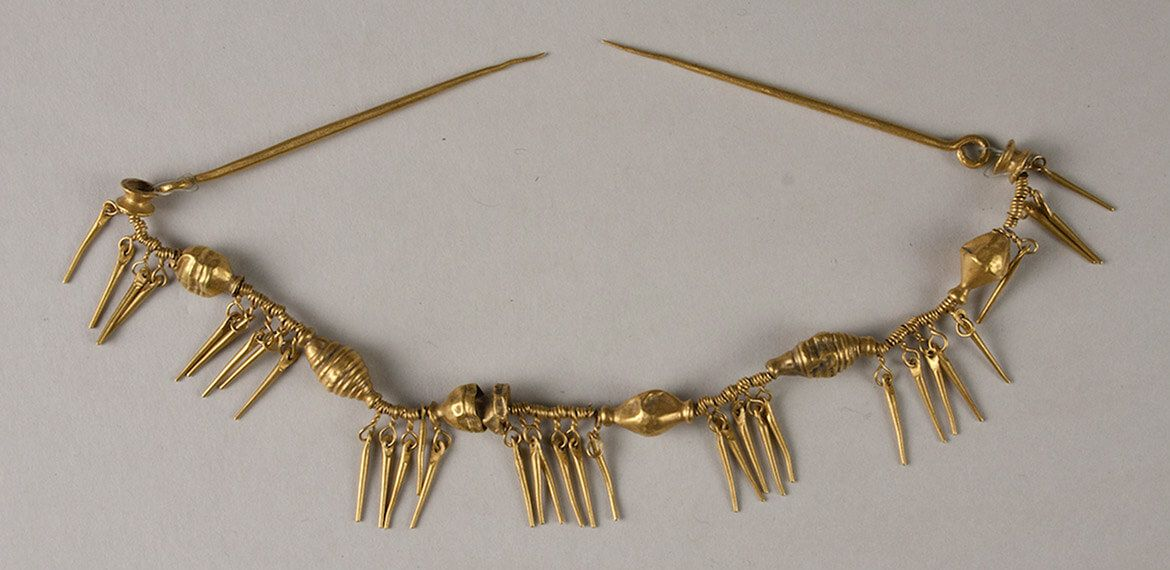
Beiral necklace or diadem (National Museum of Archaeology of Lisbon)

From December 15, 2017 to May 6, 2018, an exhibition called In Tempore Sueborum on the art and culture of the obscure Suebi took place in Ourense. The event was organized and sponsored by the Provincial Council of Ourense.

The main contributors of the artifacts of the exhibition, among many others, were the Museum D. Diogo de Sousa in Braga, the Provincial Archaeological Museum of Orense, the Numismatics Cabinet in Porto, the Museo Casa de la Moneda in Madrid, the Museo Nacional de Arqueologia in Lisbon, and the National Archeological Museum of Spain in Madrid.

Among the most important artifacts on display were imitation coinage of Western Roman and Eastern Roman emperors, silver Siliquae of Rechiar, various pieces of jewelry, plates, fibulae, brooches, and drinking vessels.

== List of Galician Suebic monarchs ==
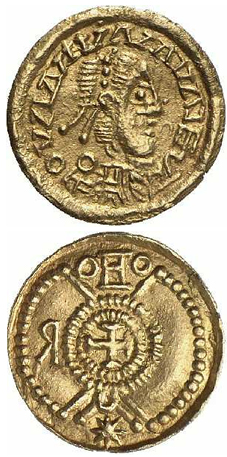
Golden Suevic coin made between years 410 and 500.

- Hermeric, c. 409–438
- Heremigarius, 427–429, leader in Lusitania
- Rechila, 438–448
- Rechiar, 448–456
- Aioulf, 456–457, foreigner, possibly appointee of the Visigoths
- Maldras, 456–460, in opposition to Framta after 457
- Framta, 457, in opposition to Maldras
- Richimund, 457–464, successor of Framta
- Frumar, 460–464, successor of Maldras
- Remismund, 464–469, succeeded Frumar, reunited the Suebi
- Period of obscurity
  - Hermeneric fl. c. 485
  - Veremund fl. 535
  - Theodemund fl. 6th century
- Chararic, after c.550–558/559, existence sometimes doubted
- Ariamir, 558/559–561/566
- Theodemar, 561/566–570
- Miro, 570–583
- Eboric, 583–584, deposed and put in a monastery by Audeca.
- Audeca, 584–585, deposed and put in a monastery by Liuvigild.
- Malaric, 585, opposed Liuvigild and was defeated.

== Sources and controversies ==
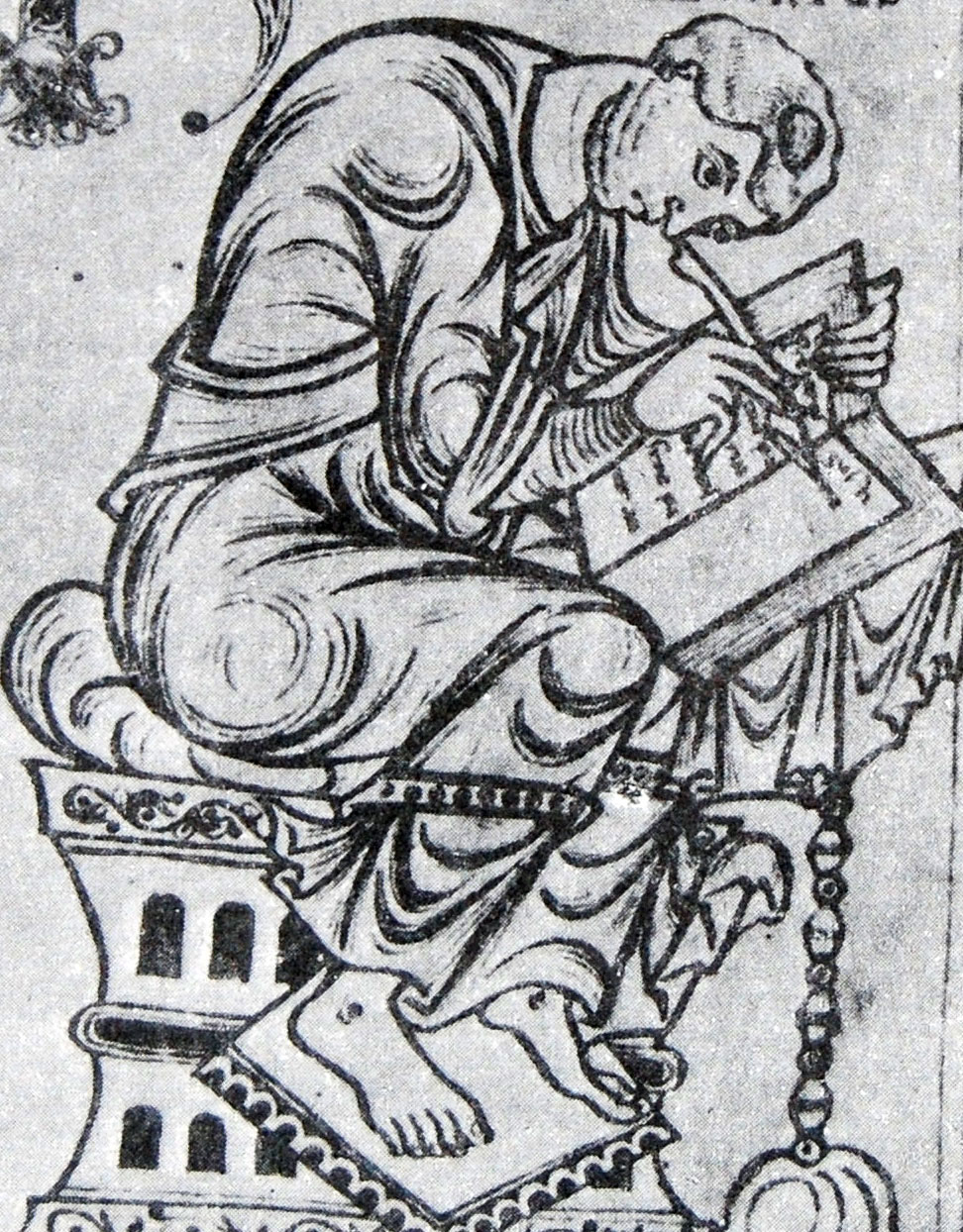
Paulus Orosius, who lived in Gallaecia when the Suevi arrived, was one of the main chroniclers reporting on the rise of the Suevic kingdom. Medieval miniature from the Saint-Epure codex.

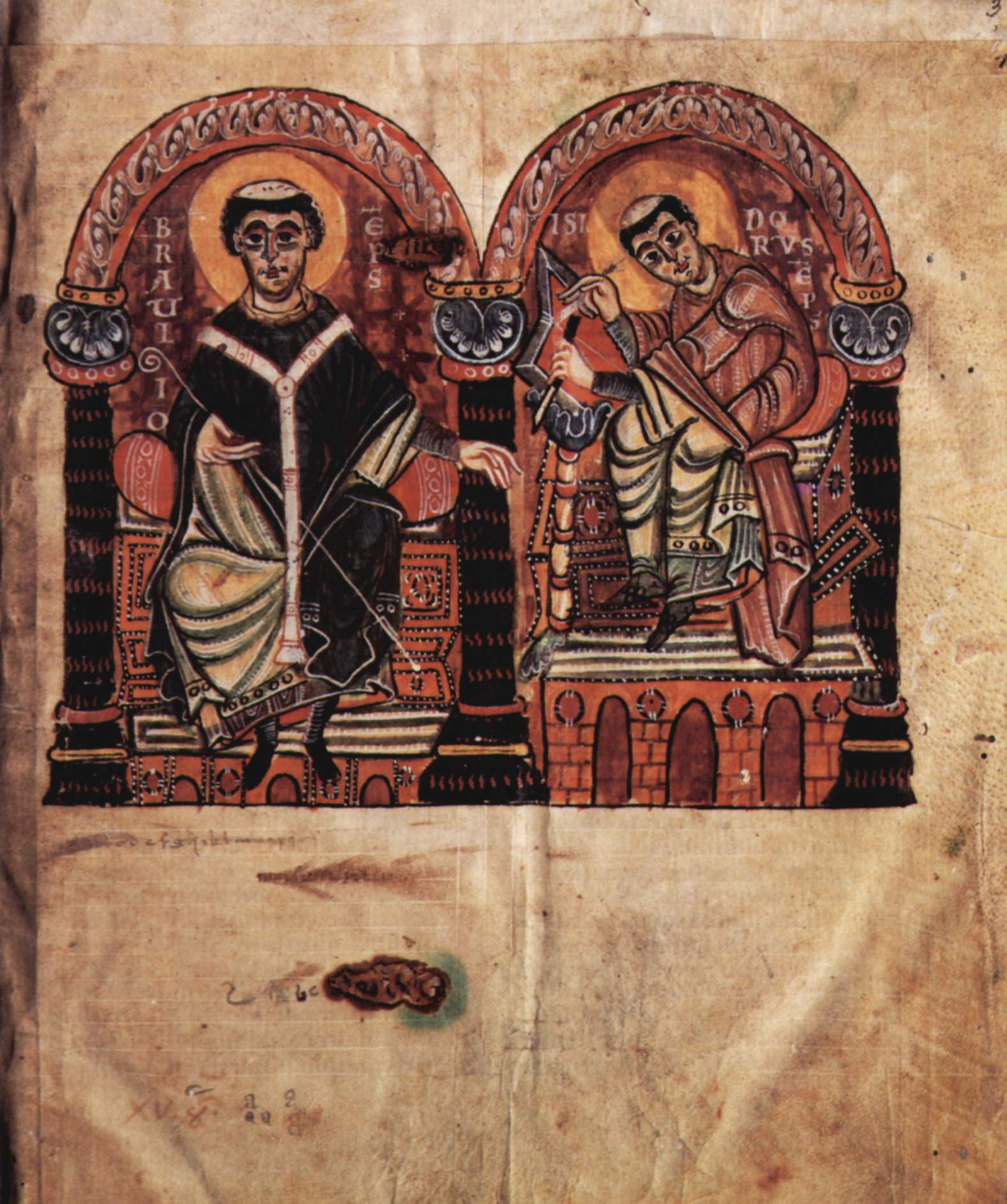
Isidore of Seville (right) and Braulio of Zaragoza (left) in an Ottonian illuminated manuscript from the 2nd half of 10th century

Unlike some other barbarian peoples, such as the Vandals, Visigoths, Ostrogoths and Huns, which played an important part in Rome's loss of the western provinces, the Sueves—establishing themselves in Gallaecia and northern Lusitania, which were remote and extra-Mediterranean areas—seldom posed a threat to Rome and to Rome's interests; in fact, at times where we have more detailed knowledge of their history through a diversity of sources, that is precisely when they became a challenge, as it was under the reign of Rechila. Throughout their history as an independent nation, they maintained an important diplomatic activity, most notably with Rome, the Vandals, the Visigoths, and, later, with the Franks. Again, they become important players during the reign of Miro, in the last third of the 6th century, when they allied with other Catholic powers—the Franks and the Eastern Romans—in support of Hermenegild, and against the Visigothic king Liuvigild. Because of their relative isolation and remoteness, sources about the Suevi people are limited, with the number translated into English even fewer.

The most important source for the history of the Suevi during the 5th century is the chronicle written by the native bishop Hydatius in 470, as a continuation of the Chronicle of Saint Jerome. Hydatius was born circa 400, in the city of the Limici, straddling the southern borders of modern-day Galicia and Portugal, on the valley of the Lima River. He witnessed the 409 settlement of the Suevi peoples in the Iberian Peninsula, and Galicia's transformation from Roman province into an independent barbarian kingdom. Through much of his life he was forced to stay in isolated Roman communities, constantly threatened by the Suevi and Vandals, though we also know that he travelled on several occasions outside of Hispania, for learning or as ambassador, and that he maintained correspondence with other bishops. In 460 he was captured by the Suevic warlord Frumarius, accused of treason by other local men. After being held captive for three months, as the Suevi ravaged the region of Chaves, he was then released unharmed, against the will of the men who had accused him. Hydatius' chronicle, whilst purporting to be universal, slowly turns into a local history. Following the barbarian settlements, he relates the conflict among the diverse nations; later, he also narrates the frequent conflict of the Sueves with the local, barely romanized, Galicians; the decline of the Roman powers in Hispania; the expansion of the Suevi into the south and the east; their defeat at the hands of Visigoths and other Roman foederati forces; and the posterior reconstitution of their kingdom under Remismund, together with their conversion to Arianism. While he is considered a great historian, his portraits are usually obscure, without any real reason or direction given to the decisions or movement of the Suevi, by mentioning what the Suevi did, but rarely what they said, or what they pretended. So Hydatius's image of the Suevi is from the outside, as lawless marauders. This description of the Suevi has bled into secondary sources: E.A. Thomson, an expert who has written many pieces on the subject, stated, "they just lash out blindly from year to year at any place that they suspected would supply them with food, valuables or money."

Another important source for the history of the Sueves during the initial settlement phase is the Seven Books of History Against the Pagans, by Orosius, another local historian. He painted a very different picture of the initial settlement of Sueves and Vandals, less catastrophic than that narrated by Hydatius. In his narration, Sueves and Vandals, after a violent entrance into Hispania, resume a pacific life, while many poor locals joined them, fleeing from Roman taxes and impositions. However, as has been pointed out, his narration is also biased by his agenda, as he was trying to exculpate Christianity for the fall and decadence of Rome.

The conflict of Vandals and Sueves is also narrated by Gregory of Tours, who in the 6th century narrated the blockade, the death of Gunderic under unknown circumstances, and the resolution of the conflict in a champions' fight, with the defeated Vandals forced to leave Galicia. A somewhat different history apparently was told among the Vandals, as Procopius wrote that in their traditions king Gunderic was captured and impaled by Germans in Spain.

For the mid-fifth century we have also chapter 44 of Jordanes' Getica, which narrates the defeat of the Suevi king Rechiar at the hands of the Roman foederati troops commanded by the Visigoths. It is a vivid, if brief, narration, where Rechiar, a defiant man, has a purpose, a mood, and emotions, as do the rest of the protagonists.

The ending of the Chronicle of Hydatius, in 469, marks the beginning of a period of obscurity in the history of the Sueves, who don't re-emerge into historical light until the mid-sixth century, when we have plenty of sources. Among these, the most notable are the works of the Pannonian Martin of Braga, sometimes called the apostle of the Sueves, as well as the accounts of Gregory of Tours. In the Miracles of Saint Martin, Gregory narrated, and attributed to a miracle of Saint Martin of Tours, the conversion of king Chararic to Catholicism, while in the History of the Franks he dedicated several chapters to the relations of Sueves, Visigoths and Franks, and to the end of the independence of the Suevi, annexed by the Visigoths in 585. On the other hand, Martin of Braga, a monk who arrived in Galicia circa 550, became a true transformative power: as founder of monasteries and as bishop and abbot of Dume he promoted the conversion of the Sueves, and later as archbishop of Braga and maximum religious authority of the kingdom he participated in the reformation of the Church and of the local administration. Several of his works have been preserved, among them a Formula for an Honest life dedicated to King Miro; a treatise against the superstitions of the country inhabitants; and several other minor treatises. He was also present in the Councils of Braga, with the deliberations of the second one being led by him, as archbishop of the capital, Braga. The acts of these Councils, together with the Divisio Theodemiri, are the most precious sources on the inner political and religious life of the kingdom.

Of paramount importance is also the chronicle written by John of Biclaro, a Visigoth, circa 590. While probably partial, his accounts are precious for the last 15 years of independence of the Sueves, as well as for the first years of the Sueves under Visigothic rule.

Finally, of great interest is also a history written by Isidore of Seville. He used Hydatius's accounts, together with the Chronicle of John of Biclaro, to form an abridged history of the Suevi in Hispania. The controversy around Isidore's historiography is centered on his omissions and additions, which many historians and scholars consider too numerous to all be simply mistakes. Throughout Isidore's History of the Kings of the Goths, Vandals, and Sueves certain details from Hydatius are altered. Many scholars attribute these changes to the fact that Isidore may have had sources other than Hydatius at his disposal.

It has been said that the history and relevance of Suevic Galicia was long marginalised and obscured inside Spain, mainly for political reasons. It was left to an Austrian scholar, Wilhelm Reinhart (1880-1953), to write the first connected history of the Suebi in Galicia, or more accurately Gallaecia as the official separation between Galicia and Portugal would only take place in 1095 AD.

== Linguistic and toponymic legacy ==
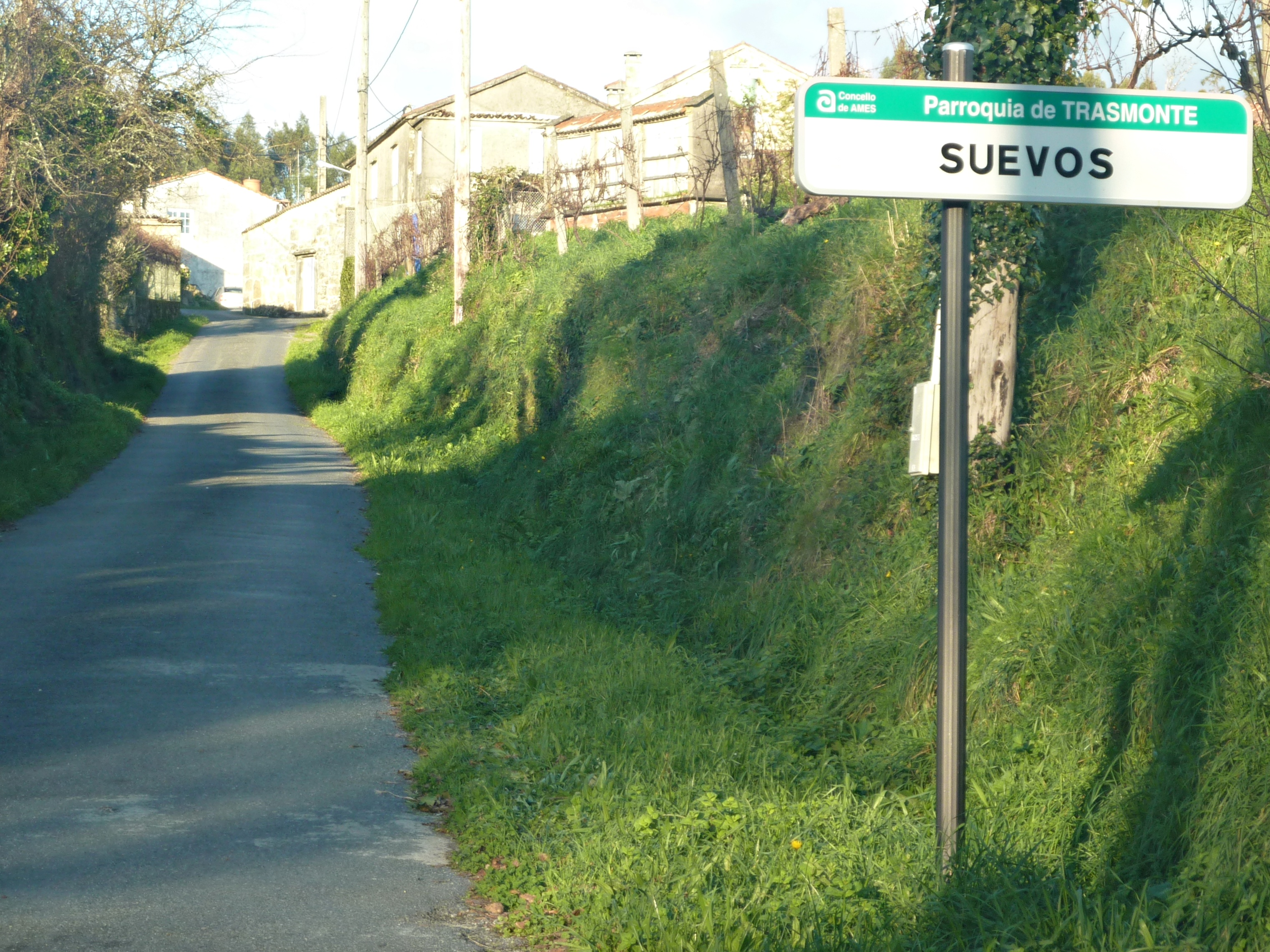
Road sign at the village of Suevos, A Coruña, Galicia

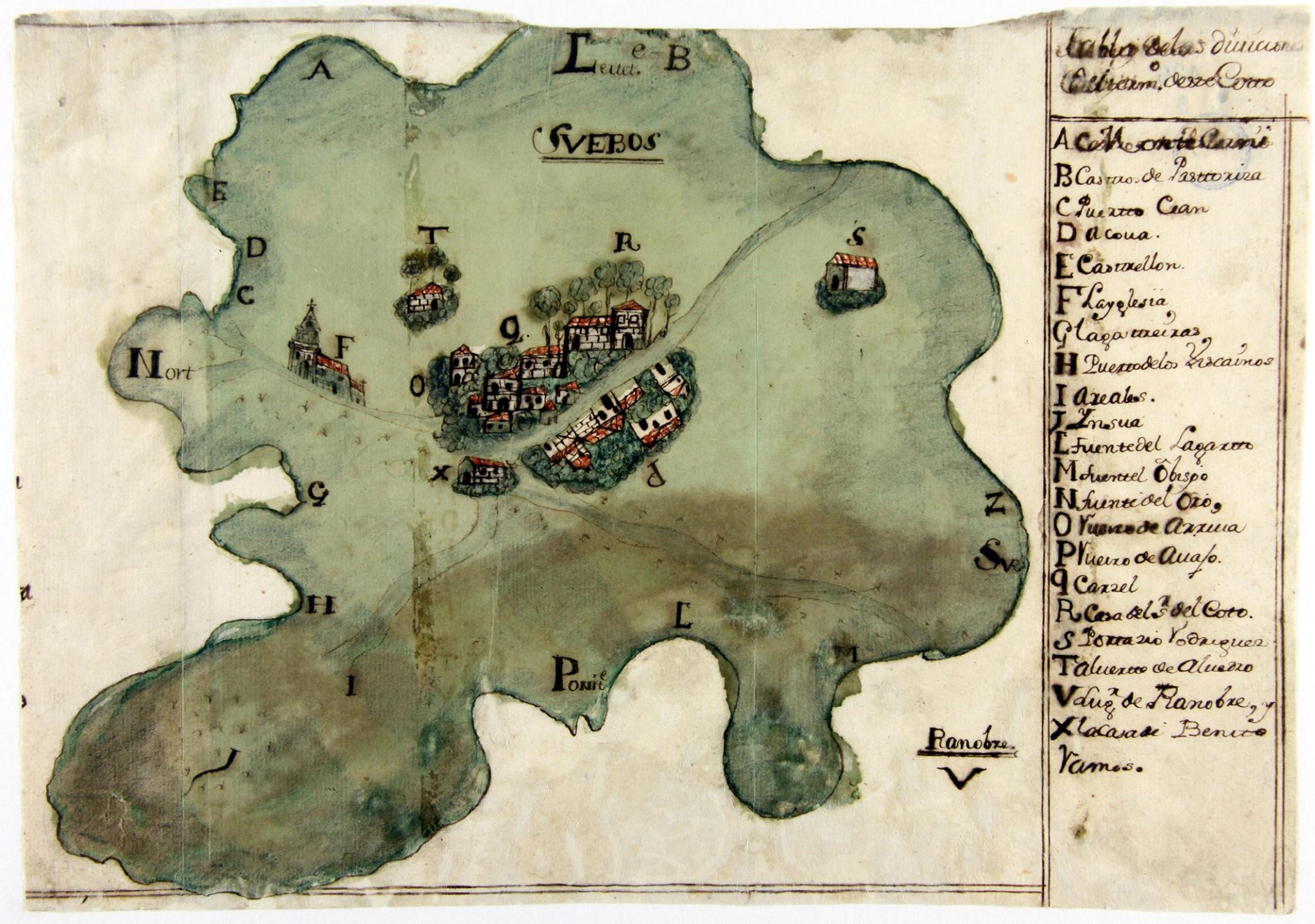
The district of Suevos, Arteixo, 18th century

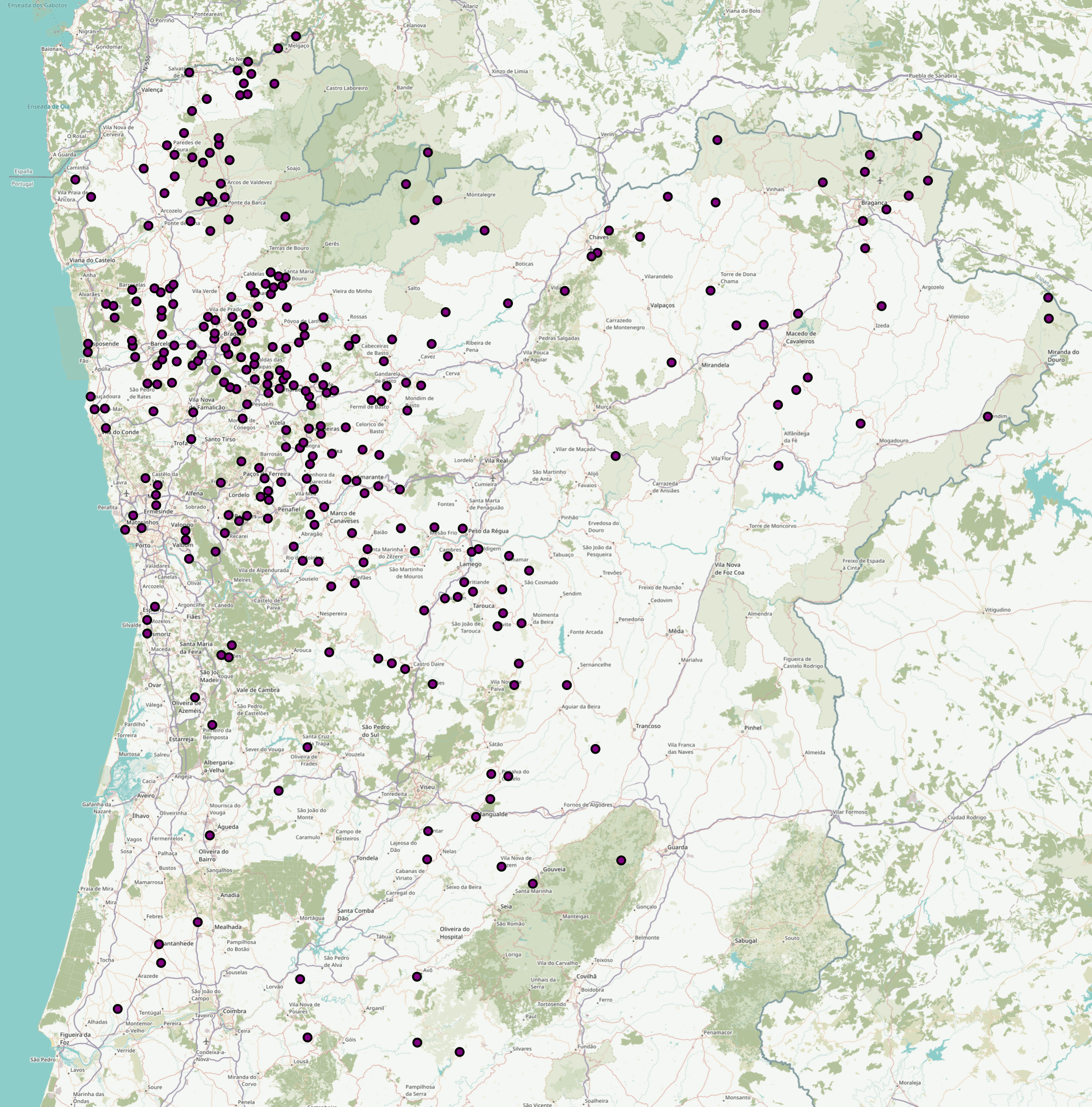
Towns with Germanic toponyms in Portugal

As the Suebi quickly adopted the local Vulgar Latin language, few traces were left of their Germanic tongue in the Galician and Portuguese languages. Distinguishing between loanwords from Gothic or Suevic is difficult, but there is a series of words, characteristic of Galicia and northern half of Portugal, which are attributed either to the Suebi or to the Goths, although no major Visigothic immigration into Gallaecia is known before the 8th century. These words are rural in nature, relative to animals, agriculture, and country life: laverca 'lark' (from Proto-Germanic *laiwazikōn 'lark'), meixengra 'titmouse' (same word as Old Norse meisingr 'titmouse', from *maisōn 'titmouse'), lobio or lóvio 'vinegrape' (to *lauban 'foliage'), britar 'to break' (from *breutanan 'to break'), escá 'bushel' (from ancient scala 'bowl', from *skēlō 'bowl'), ouva 'elf, spirit' (from *albaz 'elf'), marco 'boundary stone' (from PGmc *markan 'frontier, limit'), groba 'gully' (from *grōbō 'groove'), maga 'guts of fish' and esmagar 'to smash' (from PGmc *magōn 'stomach'), bremar 'to yearn' (from PGmc *bremmanan 'to roar'), trousa 'snowslide' (from PGmc *dreusanan 'to fall'), brétema 'mist' (from PGmc *breþmaz 'breath, vapour'), gabar 'to praise', ornear 'to bray' (from PGmc *hurnjanan 'to blow a horn'), zapa 'lid, cap' (from PGmc *tappōn 'tap'), fita 'ribbon', sá 'origin, generation' (from PGmc *salaz 'hall, dwelling'), among others.

Most notable were their contributions to local toponymy and anthroponymy, as personal names borne by the Sueves were in use among Galicians up to the Late Middle Ages, while East Germanic names in general were most common among locals during the High Middle Ages. From these names is derived also a rich toponymy, found mainly in northern Portugal and Galicia, and made up of several thousand place names derived directly from Germanic personal names, expressed as Germanic or Latin genitives: Sandiás, medieval Sindilanes, Germanic genitive form of the name Sindila; Mondariz from the Latin genitive form Munderici Munderic's; Gondomar from Gundemari and Baltar from Baltarii, both in Portugal and Galicia; Guitiriz to Witterici. Another group of toponyms which point to old Germanic settlements are the places named Sa, Saa, Sas, in Galicia, or Sá in Portugal, all derived from the Germanic word *sal- 'house, hall', and distributed mostly around Braga, Porto and in the Minho river valley in Portugal, and around Lugo in Galicia, totalling a few hundred.

In modern Galicia, four parishes and six towns and villages are still named Suevos or Suegos, from the medieval form Suevos, all of them from the Latin Sueuos 'Sueves', and referring to old Suevi settlements.

== Bibliography ==
- Arce, Javier (2005). Bárbaros y romanos en Hispania (400 - 507 A.D.). Madrid: Marcial Pons Historia. ISBN 84-96467-02-3.
- Arias, Jorge C. (2007). "Identity and Interaction: The Suevi and the Hispano-Romans." University of Virginia: Spring 2007.
- Burgess, R. W., ed. (1993). The Chronicle of Hydatius. Oxford, England: Oxford University Press, 1993.
- Cameron, Averil and others, ed. (2001a). Cambridge Ancient History, vol. 13, Late Antiquity: The Late Empire A.D. 337–425. Cambridge, England: University of Cambridge Press, 2001.
- Cameron, Averil and others, ed. (2001b). Cambridge Ancient History, vol. 14, Late Antiquity: Empire and Successors A.D. 425–600. Cambridge, England: University of Cambridge Press, 2001.
- DCECH = Coromines, Joan (2012). Diccionario crítico etimológico castellano e hispánico. Madrid: Gredos. ISBN 978-84-249-3654-9.
- Donini, Guido and Gordon B. Ford Jr., transl. (1970). Isidore of Seville’s History of the Kings of the Goths, Vandals, and Suevi, 2nd rev. ed. Leiden, Netherlands: E. J. Brill, 1970.
- Ferreiro, Alberto (1995). "Braga and Tours: Some Observations on Gregory's De virtutibus sancti Martini. Journal of Early Christian Studies. 3 (1995), p. 195–210.
- Gillett, Andrew (2003). Envoys and political communication in the late antique West : 411–533. Cambridge: Cambridge Univ. Pr. ISBN 978-0521813495.
- Hummer, Hans J. (March 1998). "The fluidity of barbarian identity: the ethnogenesis of Alemanni and Suebi, AD 200–500" (PDF). Early Medieval Europe. 7 (1): 1–27. doi:10.1111/1468-0254.00016. S2CID 162271660.
- Kremer, Dieter (2004). El elemento germánico y su influencia en la historia lingüística peninsular, in Rafael Cano, Historia de la lengua española. ISBN 84-344-8261-4, p. 133-148.
- Kulikowski, Michael (2004). Late Roman Spain and its Cities. Baltimore, MD: Johns Hopkins University Press, 2004.
- Pitts, Lynn F. (1989). "Relations between Rome and the German 'Kings' on the Middle Danube in the First to Fourth Centuries A.D." (PDF). The Journal of Roman Studies. 79: 45–58. doi:10.2307/301180. JSTOR 301180. S2CID 163755985.
- Orel, Vladimir (2003). A Handbook of Germanic Etymology. Leiden: Brill. ISBN 978-90-04-12875-0.
- Sachs, Georg (1932). Die germanischen Ortsnamen in Spanien und Portugal. Leipzig: Jena.
- Thompson, E.A. (1969). The Goths in Spain. London: Clarendon. ISBN 978-0-19-814271-3.
- Thompson, E. A. (1980). The Conversion of the Spanish Suevi to Catholicism. Visigothic Spain: New Approaches. ed. Edward James. Oxford: Oxford University Press, 1980. ISBN 0-19-822543-1.
- Thompson, E. A. (1982). Romans and Barbarians. Madison, WI: University of Wisconsin Press, 1982.
- Williams, Megan: Personal Communication, San Francisco State University History Professor. 16 November 2010.
