= First Council of Lugo =

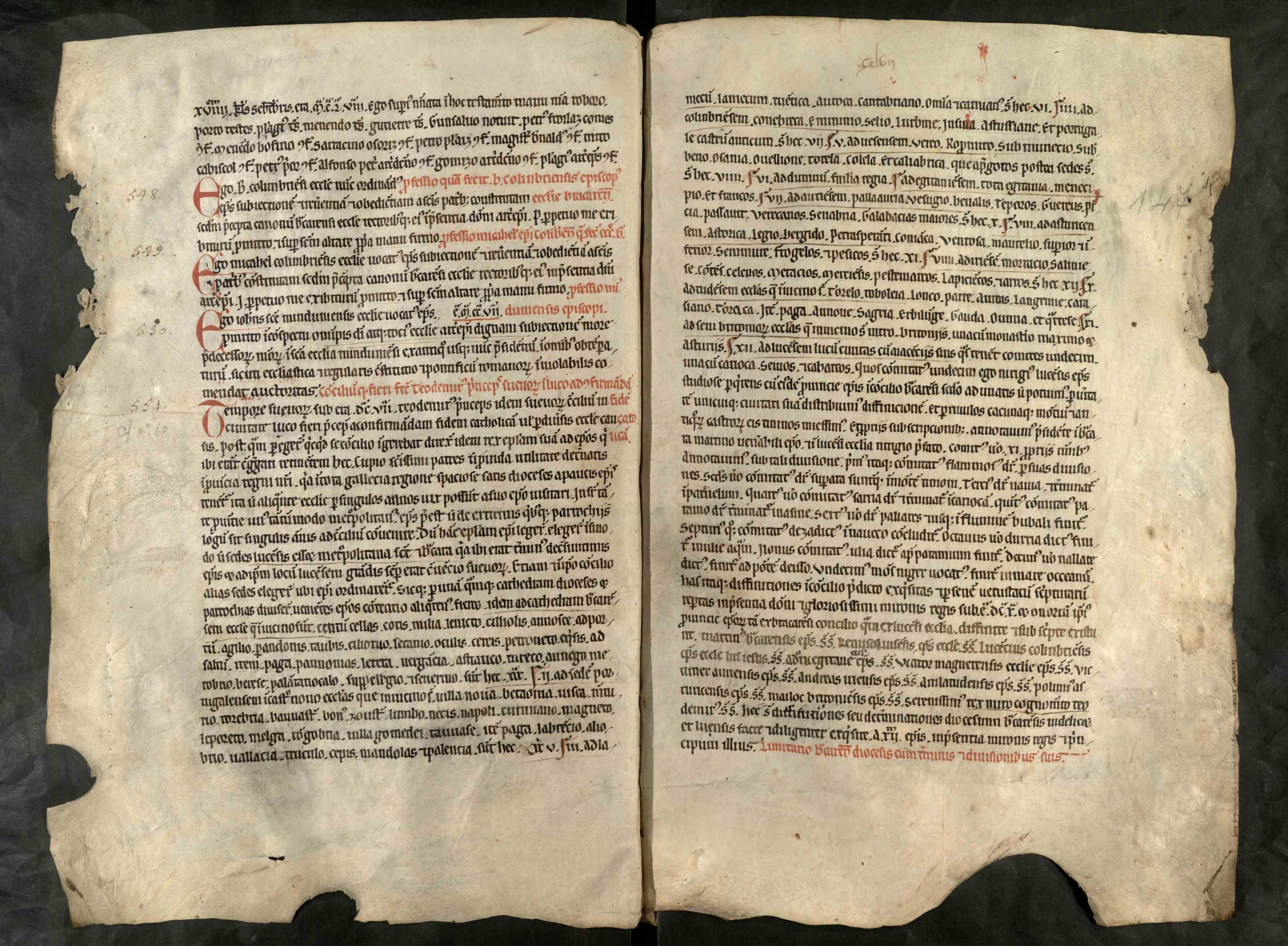
Parochiale Suevorum, council of Lugo, Doc. nº 551, Liber Fidei.

The Council of Lugo was a Catholic synod called by the Suevic king Theodemir in 569 in order to increase the number of dioceses within his kingdom. One possible reason for this restructuring was that some of the territory of the Suevic Kingdom was under the jurisdiction of bishoprics whose seats were in the Visigothic Kingdom, and this was an attempt to consolidate the kingdom politically.

The extant record for the council is known as the Parochiale Suevorum; it is not the minutes or the canons agreed upon in the council, but a list of the new dioceses along with an introduction to the document. There is a question as to whether or not this document is authentic: certain earlier historians have declared the entire document to be spurious, while some more recent scholars have accepted the full document, since many of the new dioceses are represented in the Second Council of Braga of 572. It has also been proposed that the list of dioceses is correct, but that the introduction was added at a later date – some manuscripts even list the king who called the council as Miro, Theodemir's successor. Regardless of the authenticity of the Council, the dioceses listed were created at some point between the First Council of Braga in 561 and the Second.

== Sources ==
- Barlow, Claude W., ed. Martini Episcopi Bracarensis opera omnia. New Haven: Yale University Press, 1950.
- David, Pierre. Études historiques sur la Galice et le Portugal du VIe au XIIe siècle. Lisbon: Livraria Portugália Editora, 1947.
- Itineraria et alia geographia. Corpus Christianorum Series Latina 175. Turnholt: Brepols, 1965.
- Thompson, E. A. "The Conversion of the Spanish Suevi to Catholicism." Visigothic Spain: New Approaches. Edited by Edward James. Oxford: Oxford University Press, 1980.
