= Ruccones =

The Ruccones (also called Rucones, Runcones, or Roccones) were a tribal group, probably related to the Astures or the Basques, who lived semi-autonomously in northern Hispania from the fifth through to the seventh centuries. Their population area extended approximately from modern-day Asturias to La Rioja.

== Primary sources ==
The Chronica of John of Biclar says, under the sixth year of the Emperor Justin II and the fourth of Leovigild, that is, 572, Miro Suevorum rex bellum contra Runcones movet ("Miro, king of the Suevi, moved [to make] war on the Runcones"). The Historia Suevorum of Isidore of Seville notes that "the Suevic king Miro, son of Theudemir, in the year 572, attacked and lorded it over the Arragones and the Rucones." In the same author's Historia Gothorum, he writes, under the heading Sisebutus rg. an. VIII° (the eighth year of Sisebut) that Astures et Ruccones in montibus reuellantes humiliabit et suis per omnia benibolus fuit ("the Astures and Ruccones, surrounded in the mountains, he [Sisebut] humiliated and forced to submit"). The tenth-century Chronica Albeldense copies the record of Isidore:

Iste potestate Iudeos ad fidem Xpi perduxit. Eclesiam sancte Leocadie Toleto opere miro fundabit. Astures et Ruccones in montibus reuellantes humiliabit et suis per omnia benibolus fuit. Hunc uni proprio morbo, alii inmoderato potionis austo asserunt interfectum sub imperatore Eraclio. Tune nefandus Mahomat in Africa nequitiam legis stultis populis predicabit.

== History ==
In 572 Miro, the king of the Suevi of Galicia, campaigned against the Ruccones, as much to prevent them from falling under the sway of the Visigoths as to reassert his own sovereignty over them. In 616 the Visigothic king Sisebut is recorded as having reduced some Asturian rebels and then surrounded the Ruccones in the mountains and defeated them. Under Sisebut the general Suinthila attained the rank of dux (duke) and is recorded as scoring a victory over the Ruccones. Campaigns against the Ruccones may be related to the foundation of a mint at Pésicos, which coined trientes for Gundemar and Sisebut. The Visigoths are known to have established mints in territories recently conquered as a way of spreading their authority.

== Identification ==
Scholars have worked out many identifications for the obscure Ruccones with more well known peoples. Ignacio Fernández de Mata identified them with the Cantabri. On another hypothesis they may be the Araucones, who lived in a semi-autonomous state on the border of the Visigothic and Suevic kingdoms. According to the Parroquial Suevo they were attached to the diocese of Astorga by king Miro. Based on toponymic evidence, they may have inhabited the region around Villuercas, along the banks of the Ruecas and Árrago rivers in the modern Extremadura between Trujillo and Logrosán, which was a Suevic territory in the fifth century. The Spanish Royal Academy of History makes the case for an identification with the Basques, considering them, like the Cantabrians, a regional subcategory. Finally, they may be identified with the Luggones, one of the principal peoples of the Asturias. Among scholars assenting to this last suggestion are the archaeologist José Luis Maya, who follows Diego Santos, and Miguel Calleja Puerta, who regards it as at least an increasing possibility.
