= Theodemir (Suebian king) =

- King of the Suevi
- Reign: 561–570
- Predecessor: Ariamir
- Successor: Miro
- Issue: Miro
- Father: Ariamir
- Religion: Chalcedonian Christian

Theodemir or Theodemar (also Teodomiro, Latin: Theodemirus; died 570) was one of the last Suevic kings of Galicia and one of the first Chalcedonian Christians to hold the title. He succeeded Ariamir sometime between the end of May 561 and the year 566 and ruled until his death.

Timeline of the Suebic Kings

Theodemir has been posited as the first Orthodox Christian monarch of the Suevi since the death of Rechiar and the monarch who brought about the conversion of his people from Arianism to orthodoxy with the help of the missionary Martin of Dumio. This theory is largely based on the Historia Suevorum of Isidore of Seville: regni potestatem Theodimirus suscepit: qui confestim Arrianae impietatis errore destructo Suevos catholicae fidei reddidit. However, other sources, notably John of Biclarum and Gregory of Tours, plus the minutes of the First Council of Braga, give or imply different occurrences: John that Reccared I of the Visigoths brought about the conversion of both peoples, Gregory that the saintly intercession of Martin of Tours at the bequest of the king Chararic brought it about, and the minutes of First Braga that Ariamir was the first to lift the ban on orthodox Catholic synods.

Most scholars have attempted to meld these stories. It has been alleged that Theodemir must have been a successor of Ariamir's, since Ariamir was the first Suevic monarch to lift the ban on Catholic synods; Isidore therefore gets the chronology wrong. Reinhart suggested that Chararic was converted first through the relics of Saint Martin and that Theodemir was converted later through the preaching of Martin of Dumio. Felix Dahn equated Chararic with Theodemir, even saying that the latter was the name he took upon baptism. It has also been suggested that Theodemir and Ariamir were the same person and the son of Chararic. Ferreiro believes the conversion of the Suevi was progressive and stepwise and that Thoedemir was responsible for beginning a persecution of the Arians in his kingdom to root out their heresy.

In 569 Theodemir called the First Council of Lugo, which increased the number of dioceses within the kingdom. In 570 he was attacked by the Arian king of the Visigoths, Leovigild.

== Sources ==
- Ferreiro, Alberto. "Braga and Tours: Some Observations on Gregory's De virtutibus sancti Martini." Journal of Early Christian Studies. 3 (1995), p. 195–210.
- Thompson, E. A. "The Conversion of the Spanish Suevi to Catholicism." Visigothic Spain: New Approaches. ed. Edward James. Oxford: Oxford University Press, 1980. ISBN 0-19-822543-1.

Preceded by Ariamir	King of Galicia; 561–570	Succeeded by Miro
