= Kingdom of Galicia (disambiguation) =

Kingdom of Galicia was a political entity in the Iberian Peninsula

Kingdom of Galicia may also refer to:

- Kingdom of Galicia–Volhynia, a medieval state in eastern Europe
- Kingdom of Galicia and Lodomeria, a crownland of the Habsburg Monarchy

or:

- Kingdom of the Suebi
