= Chararic (Suebian king) =

6th-century King of Galicia

- King of the Suevi
- Reign: c. 550 – 558/559
- Predecessor: Theodemund
- Successor: Ariamir

Chararic or Chararich was the King of Galicia (c. 550 – 558/559) according to Gregory of Tours, who is the only primary source for a Suevic king of this name.

Timeline of the Suebic Kings

Following Gregory's account (the Historia Francorum, written between 573 and 579), leprosy was a common disease in Galicia during the mid-sixth century and the king's son was a victim. The Suevi at that time were Arians, but Chararic, having heard of Martin of Tours, promised to accept the beliefs of the saint if only his son would be cured, and so he sent for some relics from Tours. When the relics were brought to Galicia and his son was healed by the intercession of Saint Martin, Chararic and the entire royal household converted to the Nicene faith. Gregory also notes that on the same day that Martin's relics entered the Galician harbour, another ship was landing bearing Martin of Dumio, future archbishop of Braga and saint. Gregory is unreliable on this point, however, because he adds further in his De Virtutibus S. Martini that the relics and the future bishop had both left on their journeys to Galicia on the same day as well, but as the relics travelled velociter and Martin travelled from Pannonia, their trips could not have been of identical length.

Gregory's account has come under criticism in modern times, largely because it is at odds with the other accounts of the Catholicisation of the Suevi, namely Isidore of Seville, John of Biclaro, and the minutes of the First Council of Braga. If, as Gregory relates, Martin died about the year 580 and had been bishop for about thirty years, then the conversion of Chararic must have occurred around 550 at the latest. Attempts to fix the chronology and the identities of the three kings associated with the Catholicisation—Chararic, Theodemir, and Ariamir—have been numerous. Reinhart suggested that Chararic was converted first through the cure of his son and that Theodemir was converted later through the preaching of Martin of Dumio. It has also been alleged that if Chararic existed he must have been a successor of Ariamir's, since Ariamir was the first Suevic monarch to lift the ban on Catholic synods. Ferreiro believes the conversion of the Suevi was progressive and stepwise and that Chararic's public conversion was only followed by the lifting of a ban on Catholic synods in the reign of his successor, which would have been Ariamir. Chararic has also been equated with Theodemir, some even saying that the latter was the name he took upon baptism (Dahn). It has also been suggested that Theodemir and Ariamir were the same person and the son of Chararic. In the opinion of some historians, Chararic is nothing more than an error on the part of Gregory of Tours and never existed.

Chararic introduced the cult of Martin of Tours to Galicia and made him the beatus patronus of the province. He died no later than 1 May 559 and no earlier than 2 May 558, the dates between which Ariamir succeeded to the throne.

== Sources ==
- Ferreiro, Alberto. "Braga and Tours: Some Observations on Gregory's De virtutibus sancti Martini." Journal of Early Christian Studies. 3 (1995), p. 195–210.
- Thompson, E. A. "The Conversion of the Spanish Suevi to Catholicism." Visigothic Spain: New Approaches. ed. Edward James. Oxford: Oxford University Press, 1980. ISBN 0-19-822543-1.

== Notes ==
Unknown	King of Galicia; 550–558	Succeeded by Ariamir
