= Audeca =

Audeca (Audacer)
- King of the Suevi
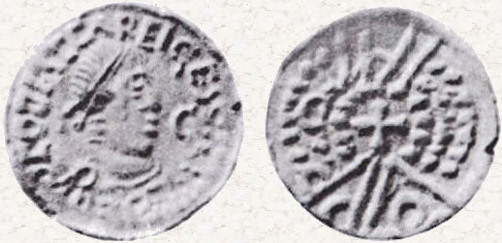
- Reign: 584–585
- Predecessor: Eboric
- Successor: Malaric
- Spouse: Siseguntia
- Dynasty: Suevic

Audeca or Andeca (Latin: Audacer) was the last Suevic King of Galicia from 584 until his deposition in 585. He deposed Eboric and usurped the throne by marrying the young king's mother, Siseguntia (or Sisegutia), the widow of Eboric's father and predecessor, Miro. He consigned Eboric to a monastery.

Timeline of the Suebic Kings

This action gave the Visigothic king Leovigild an excuse to invade the Suevic kingdom, which he did in 585. According to John of Biclar, "Leovigild devastated Galicia, deprived the captured King Audeca of his rule, and brought the people, treasure, and territory of the Suevi under his own power. He made Galicia a province of the Goths." John goes on to say that he "tonsured [Audeca] and dignified [him] with the honour of the priesthood, after having held that of the kingship." The deposed usurper was relegated to the city of Beja. To Isidore of Seville, his deposition meant the end of the Suevic kingdom, which had lasted 177 years from Isidore's starting point of 408: "the kingdom which they [the Sueves] held in idle lethargy, they have now lost at an even more shameful cost, although it may seem quite amazing that they had managed to retain up to the present day that which they have now given up without any show of resistance."

After Audeca, the Suevic kingdom ceased to exist, but one pretender, Malaric, briefly led opposition to the Visigoths.

A coin bearing the inscription ODIACCA REIGES (probably "King Odiacca") has been identified as one belonging to the reign of Audeca. The sole known coin of the type was kept in Madrid and lost in 1936. The only other Suevic king to mint coins bearing his name that have survived to this day is Rechiar.

== Sources ==
- Arias, Jorge C. Identity and Interactions: The Suevi and the Hispano-Romans University of Virginia, Spring 2007.
- Grierson, Philip, and Blackburn, Mark. Medieval European Coinage, with a Catalogue of the Coins in the Fitzwilliam Museum, Cambridge, vol. 1, The Early Middle Ages (5th–10th Centuries). Cambridge University Press, 1986.

Preceded by Eboric	King of Galicia; 584–585	Succeeded by Malaric
