= Theodemund =

- King of the Suevi
- Reign: c. 535–550
- Predecessor: Veremund
- Successor: Chararic

Timeline of the Suebic Kings

Theodemund was a Suevic King of Galicia whose reign fell in the period 469–550. This period is very obscure and little is known about the rulers in this time save that they were Arians. The hypothesis of his existence is based on a twelfth-century document that mentions a Theodemundus ruling the Sueves between Remismund and Theodomir. Because this mention occurs in a listing of seventh-century ecclesiastical divisions at the time of Wamba, Wilhelm Reinhart believes it was based on an earlier source.

== Sources ==
- Arias, Jorge C. "Identity and Interactions: The Suevi and the Hispano-Romans." University of Virginia: Spring 2007.

Preceded by Veremund	Suevic King of Galicia	Succeeded by Chararic
