= Ariamir =

- King of the Suevi
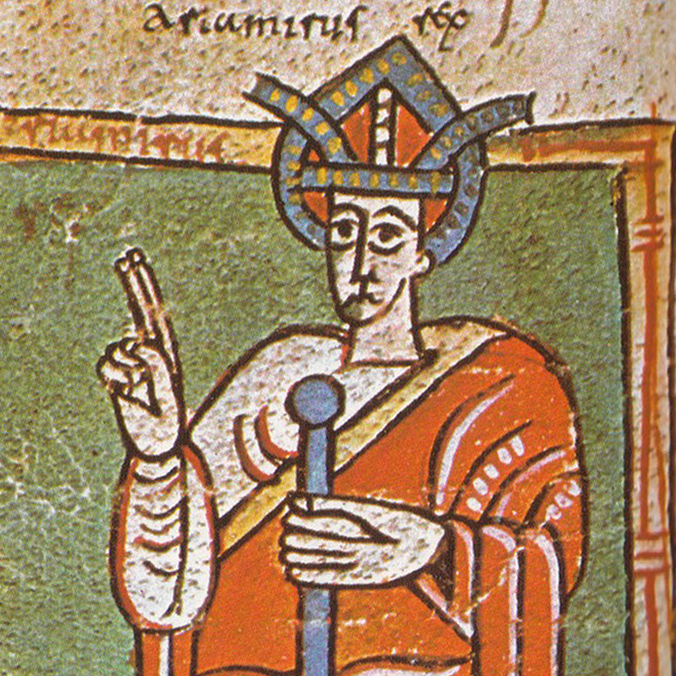
- An illustration of the First Council of Braga, showing Ariamir. From the 10th-century Codex Vigilanus.
- Reign: 558–561
- Predecessor: Chararic
- Successor: Theodemir
- Religion: Chalcedonian Christian

Ariamir (died before 566) was the Suevic King of Galicia, with his capital at Bracara, from 558/9. The bishops of the First Council of Braga recorded Ariamir as the king who summoned them and under whose auspices they deliberated. Because the bishops mention theirs as being the first Nicene synod to be held in Galicia in a long while, Ariamir is sometimes assumed to have been the king who led the conversion of his people from Arianism to orthodoxy and thus to have lifted the ban on Nicene councils.

Timeline of the Suebic Kings

The conversion of the Suevi to Catholicism, however, is presented very differently in the primary records, of which the minutes of the council of Braga are the only contemporary ones. Specifically, the minutes of the council—which met on 1 May 561 (in the era of the province 599, the third year of his reign, anno tertio Ariamiri regis)—state explicitly that the synod was held at his orders, ex praecepto praefati gloriosissimi Ariamiri regis, and the bishops allude to him as "our most glorious and pious son" (gloriosissimus atque piissimus filius noster). Based on the dating clause, Ariamir's reign can be said to have begun between 2 May 558 and 1 May 559. While his Catholicism is not in doubt, that he was the first Catholic monarch of the Sueves since Rechiar has been contested.

It has also been suggested that Ariamir was the same person as Theodemir, who is mentioned by Isidore of Seville in connection with the Suevic conversion and Martin of Dumio. He is likewise also said to have been a son of Chararic, a king mentioned by Gregory of Tours in connection with the conversion and Martin of Tours. It is likely, however, that Chararic and Theodemir must have reigned after Ariamir, since Ariamir must have been the first Suevic monarch to lift the ban on Catholic synods and it is inconceivable that a Catholic monarch could have continued the ban for "a long time". On the other hand, some scholars see the conversion of the Suevi as progressive and stepwise and regard Ariamir's lifting of the ban on synods as the second step following Chararic's public conversion.

Aside from the council held in his name, nothing else is known of Ariamir except that he was probably succeeded sometime between the end of May 561 and the year 566 by Theodemir.

== Sources ==
- Ferreiro, Alberto. "Braga and Tours: Some Observations on Gregory's De virtutibus sancti Martini." Journal of Early Christian Studies. 3 (1995), p. 195–210.
- Thompson, E. A. "The Conversion of the Spanish Suevi to Catholicism." Visigothic Spain: New Approaches. ed. Edward James. Oxford: Oxford University Press, 1980. ISBN 0-19-822543-1.

== Notes ==
Preceded by Chararic	King of Galicia; 558–561	Succeeded by Theodemir
