= Monastery of Santa María de Mezonzo =

Coordinates: 43.060278°N 8.134722°W

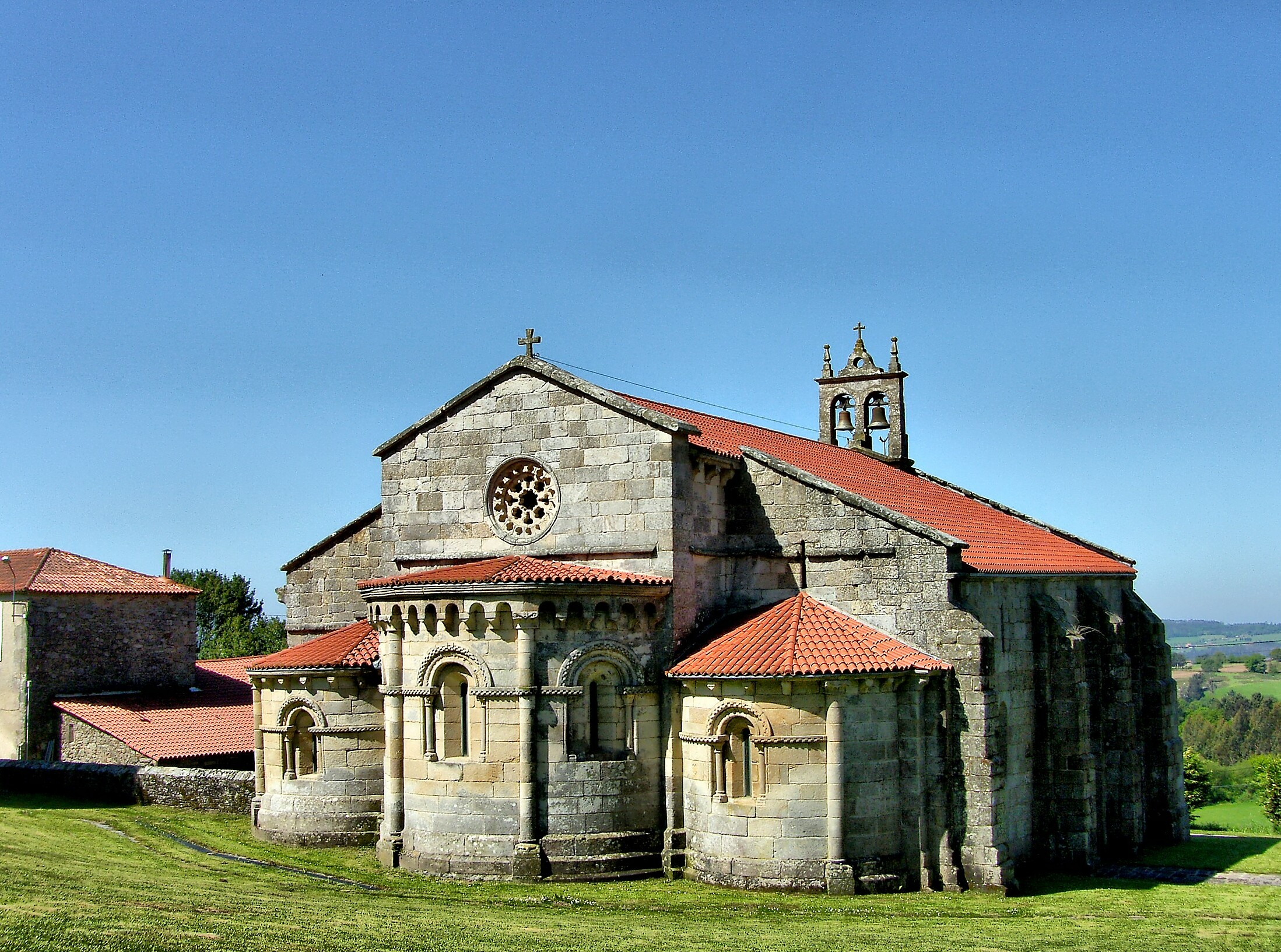
- Apses of the monastery.

Religion
- Affiliation: Roman Catholic
- Ecclesiastical or organizational status: Monastery

Location
- Location: Vilasantar, Galicia, Spain
- Interactive map of Monastery of Santa María de Mezonzo

Architecture
- Direction of façade: West

The Monastery of Santa María de Mezonzo is a Spanish religious building in Romanesque style in the parish of Santa María de Mezonzo, in the municipality of Vilasantar. Although it probably dates back to the time of the Kingdom of the Suebi, the current monastery was founded as a double convent by Abbot Reterico. According to Antonio López Ferreiro, the monastery was donated to the Asturian-Galician king Alfonso III el Magno in 870. Justo Pérez de Urbel, after comparing the names of the confirmatory of several documents related to the monastery, thinks that the correct date is the one given by Hinojosa, that is, the year 930.
