= Eboric =

Suevic King

- King of the Suevi
- Reign: 583–584
- Predecessor: Miro
- Successor: Audeca
- Father: Miro
- Mother: Sisegutia

Timeline of the Suebic Kings

Eboric or Euric was the last legitimate Suevic King of Galicia. He was the adolescent son of Miro and Sisegutia (or Siseguntia) and he succeeded his father in 583, ruling for a year before being deposed by his mother's second husband, Audeca, who threw him in a monastery. His deposition gave the Visigothic king Leovigild casus belli to invade Galicia and remove Audeca from power.

== Sources ==
- Arias, Jorge C. "Identity and Interactions: The Suevi and the Hispano-Romans." University of Virginia: Spring 2007.

Preceded by Miro	King of Galicia; 583–584	Succeeded by Audeca
