= Miro (Suebian king) =

- King of the Suevi
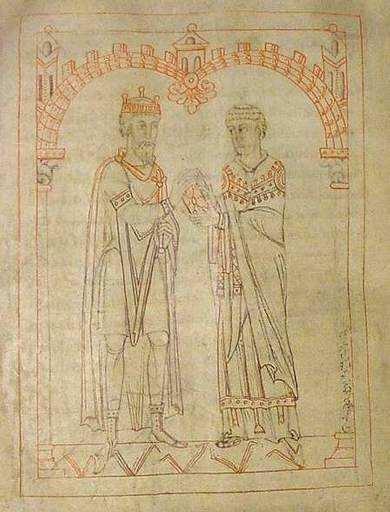
- Miro and Martin of Braga, from an 1145 manuscript of Martin's De virtutibus quattuor (Federzeichnung lm Co. 791, fol. 109v), now in the Austrian National Library.
- Reign: 570–583
- Predecessor: Theodemir
- Successor: Eboric
- Consort: Sisegutia
- Issue: Eboric
- Father: Theodemir

Miro (Mir, Mirio, Latin: Mirus) was the Suebian King of Galicia from 570 until his death in 583. His reign was marked by attempts to forge alliances with other Chalcedonian Christian nations with the goal of checking the power of the Arian Visigoths under Leovigild. During his reign relations were established with both Francia and the Byzantine Empire and the kingdom reached its zenith, but it collapsed within three years of his death.

Timeline of the Suebic Kings

Miro enjoyed good relations with the Church during his reign. In 572 he called the Second Council of Braga, a supplementary council to the First Council of Braga of 561. It has even been suggested, based on the lack of a signatory for the diocese of Dumio in the concilar acts, that Miro himself may have represented that see.

Miro also maintained "intimate and friendly" relations with Martin of Dumio, the Archbishop of Braga and Metropolitan of Gallaecia. Martin's principal work, Formula Vitae Honestae, is dedicated to him, and the Exhortatio Humilitatis, printed among Martin's works, is also probably addressed to him. Indeed, Martin advised Miro's counsellors to read his Formula so as to be able better to counsel the king.

In the same year as the council of Braga, Miro conducted an expedition against the Ruccones (Runcones) of Cantabria, possibly a Basque tribe, with the intention of expanding his kingdom. This attack on a people within the Gothic kingdom was perhaps an excuse for Gothic reprisals against the Sueves. In 573 Leovigild subdued the region of "Sabaria" (probably between Zamora and Salamanca) with the likely intention of preempting Miro. In 574 he "restored the province [of Cantabria] to his dominion." In response, Miro sent envoys to Guntram, the Frankish King of Burgundy and a consistent thorn in Leovigild's side, but they were intercepted and detained on the way by Leovigild's ally, Chilperic I, the Frankish king of Neustria.

In 575 Leovigild invaded the "Aregensian Mountains" near Ourense and captured "the lord of the region, along with his wife, children, and riches, bringing the region under his power." Aspidius, the "lord of the region", may have been a Hispano-Roman landowner who had sided with the Suevi. In 576 Leovigild again marched to the southern frontier of Galicia (the Douro) and menaced the small kingdom, even founding the city of Villa Gothorum (modern Toro). Miro sued for peace, and obtained it for a short time. In 580 Miro endeavoured to support Leovigild's Catholic son Hermenegild in rebellion.

For the events surrounding Miro's death, the contemporary and near-contemporary accounts conflict. According to Gregory of Tours, in 583 Miro led an army to raise the siege of Seville by Leovigild, but the two kings held a conference before Miro had reached Seville and he returned to Galicia, where he died shortly after, supposedly from the effects of the bad air and water of Baetica. On the other hand, two Iberian chroniclers, John of Biclar and Isidore of Seville, concur that he died before Seville while assisting Leovigild with the siege of the town. Modern scholarship favours Gregory's interpretation, taking into account Miro's alliances with Francia and Byzantium, Suevic animosity to the Goths, and the shared Catholic faith of Sueves and rebels.

He was succeeded in provincia Gallacciæ by his adolescent son Eboric. He also left a widow, Sisegu(n)tia, who married Andeca, who deposed Eboric and took to ruling in Gallaccia Suevorum regnum.

== Sources ==
- Arias, Jorge C. "Identity and Interaction: The Suevi and the Hispano-Romans." Ph.D. dissertation. University of Virginia: Spring 2007.
- "Miro." In Henry Wace and William C. Piercy, edd. A Dictionary of Christian Biography and Literature. London: John Murray, 1911. Reprinted as Dictionary of Christian Biography and Literature to the End of the Sixth Century A.D., with an Account of the Principal Sects and Heresies. United States: Hendrickson Publishers, 1999. ISBN 1-56563-460-8.

Preceded by Theodemir	King of Galicia; 570–583	Succeeded by Eboric
