= Historia de regibus Gothorum, Vandalorum et Suevorum =

Book

The Historia de regibus Gothorum, Vandalorum et Suevorum ("History of the Kings of the Goths, Vandals and Suevi") is a Latin history of the Goths from 265 to 624, written by Isidore of Seville. It is a condensed account and, due to its diverse sources, somewhat inconsistent. The history of the Vandals is appended after that of the Goths, followed by a separate history of the Suevi.

Isidore begins his history with a prologue, Laus Spaniae, praising the virtues of Spain. It is here that he invents the phrase mater Spania (mother Spain). The rest of the work elaborates and defends the Gothic identity of a unified Spain. Isidore uses the Spanish era for dating throughout. The main source for his early history was Jerome's continuation of Eusebius to the year 378. From there he used primarily Orosius (to 417) and, for Spain, Hydatius (to 469). For his later history he relies on Prosper Tiro's continuation of Jerome (405–53). Victor of Tununa is his primary African witness for the years 444 to 566 and John of Biclar for recent Spanish history (565–90). Isidore also made use of a partially lost chronicle of Maximus of Zaragoza. For events in Spain between 590 and 624 Isidore is the modern historian's primary source.

The Historia was composed in two versions, both surviving. The first, completed probably in 619, the year of the death of king Sisebut, is shorter. The longer version was probably completed in 624, in the fifth year of the reign of Suinthila. Only the longer version contains the Laus Spaniae and the Laus Gothorum, a eulogy of the Goths, which divides the Goths' history (to the reign of Suinthila) from that of the Vandals. The edition of the longer version by Theodor Mommsen is the standard and was the basis of the first English translation. The Historia was previously translated into German.
