= First Council of Braga =

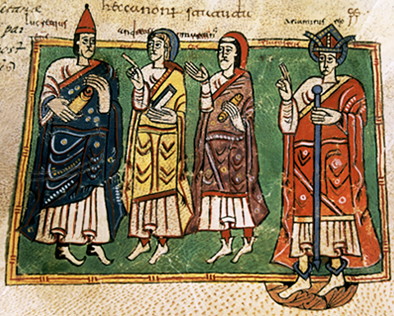
Illustrated depiction of the First Council of Braga

In the First Council of Braga, held in 561 in the city of Braga, eight bishops took part, and twenty-two decrees were promulgated. In a number of canons, the council took aim directly at doctrines of Priscillianism.

== Decrees ==
Those decrees included the following: that in the services of the church the same rite should be followed by all, and that on vigils and in solemn Masses the same lessons should be said by all; that bishops and priests should salute the people with Dominus vobiscum, as in the Book of Ruth (Ruth 2:4), the response being Et cum spiritu tuo, as was the custom in the East, without the alterations introduced by the Priscillianists; that Mass should be said according to the ordo sent from Rome to Profuturus; that the form used for baptism in the Metropolitan see of Braga should not be altered; that bishops should take rank after the metropolitan according to the date of their consecration; that bishops should not ordain candidates from other dioceses without dimissorial letters from their bishop; that nothing should be sung in the church but the Psalms and parts of the Old and New Testament; that all priests who abstained from eating meat should be obliged to eat vegetables cooked in meat, to avoid all suspicion of the taint of Priscillianism, and that if they refused they should be excommunicated; that suicides and catechumens should not be buried with great ceremony, nor should anyone be buried inside the church; that priests should be appointed for the blessing of the chrism.

== Condemnation of astrology ==
Canons 9 and 10 "explicitly condemned the practice of astrology", another direct condemnation of Priscillianism.

== See also ==
- Councils of Braga
