= Timeline of Germanic kingdoms in the Iberian Peninsula =

This is a historical timeline of the Iberian Peninsula during the period of the post-Imperial kingdoms (5th to 8th centuries).

== 5th century ==
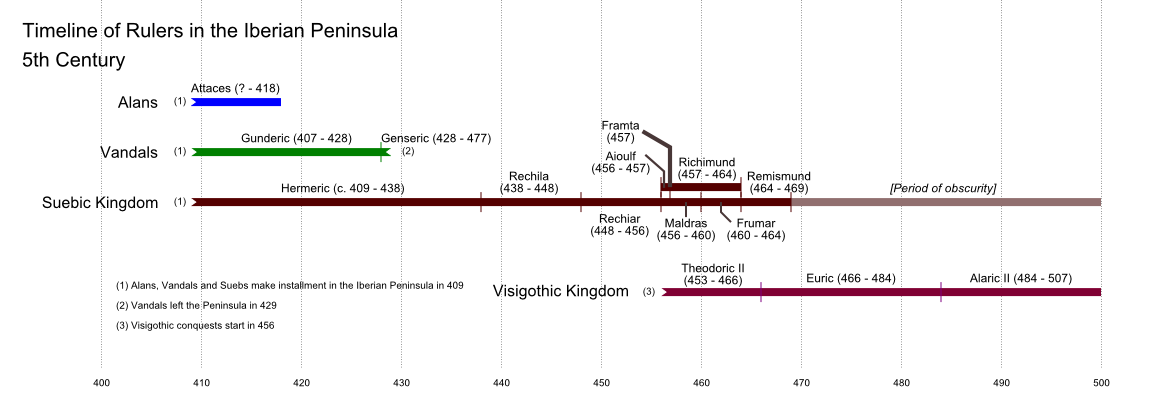
Timeline of rulers in the Iberian Peninsula during the 5th century

- 409
  - Invasion of the NW of the Iberian Peninsula (the Roman Gallaecia) by the Suevi (Quadi and Marcomanni) under king Hermeric, accompanied by the Buri. The Suevic Kingdom eventually received official recognition (Foedus) from the Romans for their settlement there in Gallaecia. It was the first kingdom separated from the Roman Empire that minted coins.
  - Invasion of the Iberian peninsula by the Vandals (Silingi and Hasdingi) and the Sarmatian Alans.
- 410 – Rome is sacked by the Visigoths under King Alaric I.
- 411 – A treaty with Western Roman Emperor Flavius Augustus Honorius grants Lusitania to the Alans, Gallaecia to the Suevi and Hasdingi, and Baetica to the Silingi.
- 414 – Paulus Orosius, clergyman of Braga, visits St. Augustine in Hippo Regius.
- 415
  - Baquiário, priest of Braga, writes his work De fide, where he retracts from Priscillianism heresy.
  - Beginning of the invasion of the Iberian Peninsula by the Visigoths led by King Theodoric, expanding from Aquitaine and under request by the Romans. The kingdoms of the Alans and the Silingi Vandals are destroyed.
- 417 – Balconius becomes bishop of Braga.
- 419 – The Hasdingi Vandals attack the Suevi, these resist with Roman aid.
- 426 – The Alan king Attaces is killed in battle against the Visigoths, and this branch of the Alans subsequently appealed to the Vandal king Gunderic to accept the Alan crown.
- 427 – Hydatius is ordained bishop of Aquae Flaviae (modern Chaves). Hydatius was the author of a chronicle of his own times that provides us with our best evidence for the history of Hispania in the 5th century.

Maximum extension of the Suebic Kingdom (455).

- 428 – The Alans defeat the Suevi and the Romans at the Battle of Mérida.
- 429 – The Vandals and the Alans move to North Africa, where they establish a kingdom. The Buri vanish into the Suevi kingdom.
- 438 – Hermerico, the first Suevi king of Gallaecia, ratified the peace with the Galaicos people and, tired of fighting, abdicated in favor of his son Requila.
- 448 – Suevi king Requila dies leaving a state in expansion to his son Requiario who imposed his Catholic faith on the Suevi population.
- 451 – Thorismund becomes King of the Visigoths.
- 453 – Theodoric II becomes King of the Visigoths.
- 454 – The Ibero-Roman population ask for the help of King Theodoric II of the Visigoths against Suevi incursions.
- 455 – The Bishop of Rome assumes control over all of Western Christianity, proclaiming himself Pope, under the name of Leo I.
- 456
  - King Theodoric II of the Visigoths defeats the Suevi at the Battle of Orbigo and sacks their capital city Braga.
  - Suevi king Requiario is executed and some candidates for the throne appear, grouped in two factions, those who follow Frantán and those who follow Aguiulfo (dependent of the Visigoths). A division marked for the river Minius is noticed, probably a consequence of the two tribes, Quadi and Marcomanni, who constituted the Suevi nation.
- 457 – Maldras becomes king of all the Suevi.
- 459 – After the death of King Maldras of the Suevi, a new division appears between Frumario and Remismundo.
- 462 – Hydatius, Bishop of Aquae Flaviae (modern Chaves), is imprisoned by the Visigoths.
- 463 – Remismundo unites the Suevi and becomes king.
- 466 – Euric becomes king of the Visigoths.
- 468
  - The Roman city of Conimbriga, near modern Coimbra, is sacked by the Suevi.
  - Lusídio, Roman governor of Lisbon, delivers the city to the Suevi.
- 469 – Teodemundo becomes King of the Suevi.
- 470
  - Hydatius, Bishop of Aquae Flaviae, dies.
  - King Euric of the Visigoths conquers southern Gallaecia and Lusitania to the Suevi.
- 475 – King Euric (who unified the various quarreling factions of the Visigoths) forces the Roman government to grant the Visigothic kingdom full independence. At his death, the Visigoths were the most powerful of the successor states to the Western Roman Empire.
- 476, 4 September – Romulus Augustus, the last usurper Emperor of the Western Roman Empire, is deposed when the chieftain of the Heruli, Flavius Odoacer, proclaims himself King of Italy and vassal of Emperor Zeno. Conventional date for the fall of the Western Roman Empire, and widely considered the end of ancient history and beginning of the Middle Ages.
- 484 – Alaric II becomes king of the Visigoths.

== 6th century ==
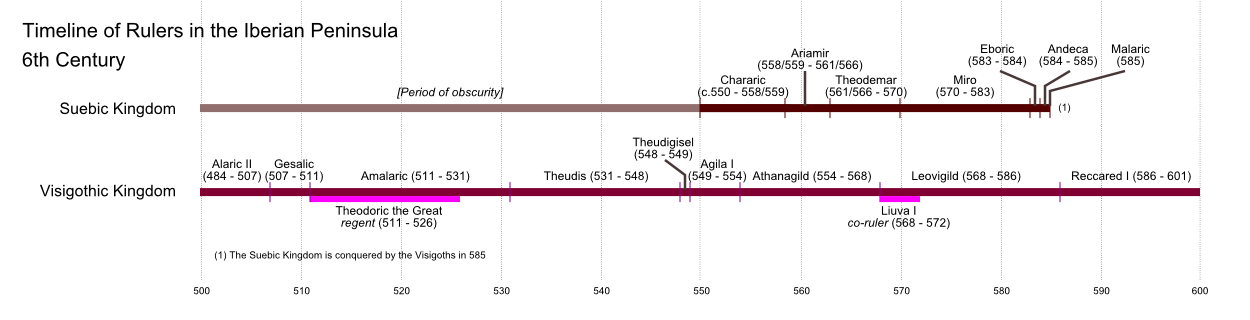
Timeline of rulers in the Iberian Peninsula during the 6th century

- 501 – Council (Ecumenical Synod) of Braga.
- 507
  - At the Battle of Vouillé the Franks wrested control of Aquitaine from the Visigoths. King Alaric II, the conqueror of all Hispania, was killed in battle, and after a temporary retreat to Narbonne, Visigoth nobles spirited his heir, the child-king Amalaric to safety across the Pyrenees and into Iberia.
  - Gesalec becomes king of the Visigoths.
- 511–526 – The Visigoths and Ostrogoths were reunited under Theodoric the Great, ruling from Ravenna, acting as regent for Amalaric. The center of Visigothic rule shifted first to Barcelona, then inland and south to Toledo.
- 526 – Amalaric becomes king of the Visigoths.
- 527 – Council (Ecumenical Synod) of Toledo.
- 531 – Theudis becomes king of the Visigoths.
- 537 – Profuturus becomes bishop of Braga.
- 548 – Theudigisel becomes king of the Visigoths.
- 549 – Agila becomes king of the Visigoths.
- 550
  - Karriarico becomes King of the Suevi.
  - Saint Martin of Dumes arrives in Suevish Gallaecia. Born in Pannonia, he was the foremost Iberian scholar of his time. He was given the church of Dume, where he built a monastery.
- 554 – Athanagild becomes king of the Visigoths.

Conquests of Leovigild (572–588).

- 558 – Saint Martin, Abbot of Dumes becomes Bishop of Dume.
- 559 – Teodomiro becomes King of the Suevi.
- 561 – Council (Ecumenical Synod) of Braga.
- 562 – Saint Martin of Dumes becomes Bishop of Braga.
- 567 – Liuva I becomes king of the Visigoths.
- 568 – Liuvigild becomes king of the Visigoths.
- 569 – Council (Ecumenical Synod) of Lugo.
- 570
  - Miro becomes King of the Suevi.
  - King Liuvigild of the Visigoths begins military actions with the explicit purpose of conquering all of Hispania.
- 572 – Council (Ecumenical Synod) of Braga.
- 583 – Eborico (also called Eurico) becomes King of the Suevi.
- 584
  - Andeca becomes King of the Suevi.
  - The Visigothic King Liuvigild invades the Suevic kingdom and finally defeats it.
- 585 – Andeca, the last king of the Suevi, held out for a year before surrendering in to the Visigothic King Liuvigild. With his surrender, this branch of the Suevi vanished into the Visigothic kingdom.
- 586 – Reccared becomes king of the Visigoths.
- 587 – Reccared, the Visigothic king at Toledo, having been converted to Catholicism puts an end to dissension on the question of Arianism and launched a movement to unify the various religious doctrines that existed in Hispania.
- 589 – Pantardus becomes bishop of Braga.

== 7th century ==
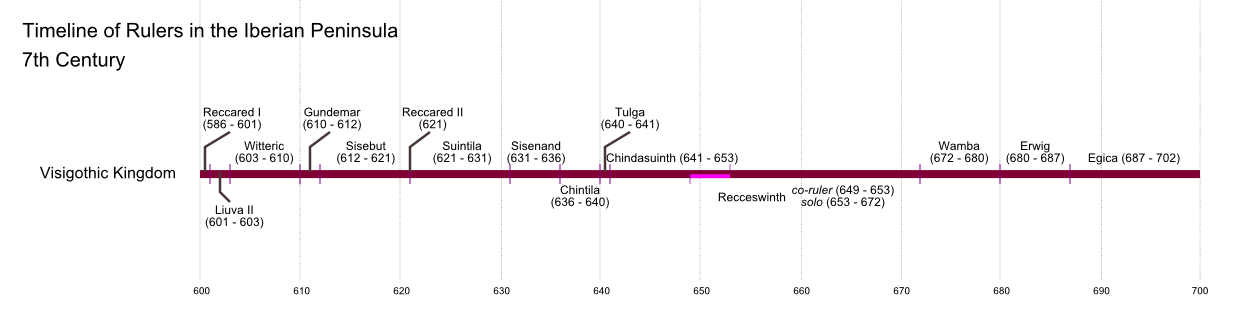
Timeline of rulers in the Iberian Peninsula during the 7th century

- 601 – Liuva II becomes king of the Visigoths.
- 604 – Witteric becomes king of the Visigoths.
- 610 – Gundemar becomes king of the Visigoths.
- 612 – Sisebur becomes king of the Visigoths.
- 621 – Suintila becomes king of the Visigoths.
- 624 – The Visigoths, through the conquest of the last Byzantine domains and the Basque Country, control all of the Iberian peninsula.
- 631 – Sisenand becomes king of the Visigoths.
- 633 – Julian becomes bishop of Braga.
- 636 – Chintila becomes king of the Visigoths.
- 640 – Tulga becomes king of the Visigoths.
- 641 – Chindasuinth becomes king of the Visigoths.
- 649 – Reccasuinth becomes king of the Visigoths.
- 653 – Potamius becomes bishop of Braga.
- 656 – St. Fructuosus of Dumes becomes bishop of Braga.
- 663 – Council (Ecumenical Synod) of Braga.
- 672 – Wamba becomes king of the Visigoths.
- 675
  - Leodegisius becomes bishop of Braga.
  - Council (Ecumenical Synod) of Braga.
- 680 – Erwig becomes king of the Visigoths.
- 681 – Liuva becomes bishop of Braga.
- 688 – Faustinus becomes bishop of Braga.
- 693 – Félix becomes bishop of Braga. Félix of Braga was the last bishop of Braga to reside there until 1070, due to the Moorish invasion. His successors established themselves in Lugo (Galicia).

== 8th century ==
- 701 – Wittiza becomes king of the Visigoths.
- 710 – Roderic becomes king of the Visigoths.
- 719 – Founding of the Kingdom of Asturias.

== See also ==
- Timeline of Portuguese history
  - Timeline of Portuguese history (Lusitania and Gallaecia) (3rd century BCE to 4th century CE)
  - Timeline of 8th- and 9th-century Portuguese history (Al'Garb Al'Andalus and the beginning of the Reconquista)
