= Germanic personal names in Galicia =

Germanic names, inherited from the Suevi (who settled in Gallaecia: modern Galicia and northern Portugal in 409 AD), Visigoths, Vandals, Franks and other Germanic peoples, were often the most common Galician-Portuguese names during the early and high Middle Ages. This article deals with Germanic personal names recorded and used in Galicia, northern Portugal and its adjoining regions: territories of the kingdom of the Suebi during the early Middle Ages from its 409 settlement to the 12th century.

"(...) Igitur dum inter nos intemptio uertitur ad diuidendum mancipia de parentorum nostrorum Guntine et Rosule de neptos senatoris Siserici et Esmorice et de suos iermanos. Ideo que euenit in portione de filios Gunterodis, id est: Argiuitus, Gentibus, Tratiuigia, Recedrudi, Gaudiosus, Tequelo, Iulia, filios Stanildi, Sitiuidis, Gluscudilum, Framildi, Ruderigus, Sonobrida, Sabarigis, Argeleuba, Ostosia, Guntedrudia, Uitiza et Leuba, Guntildi, Iulia, Ragesindus, Sanildi cum sua filia Ermegundia, Seniorina, Uisteuerga, Sisulfus, Branderigus, Astruildi (...)"

Germanic and Latin names in a 10th-century Galician document.

== Germanic names ==
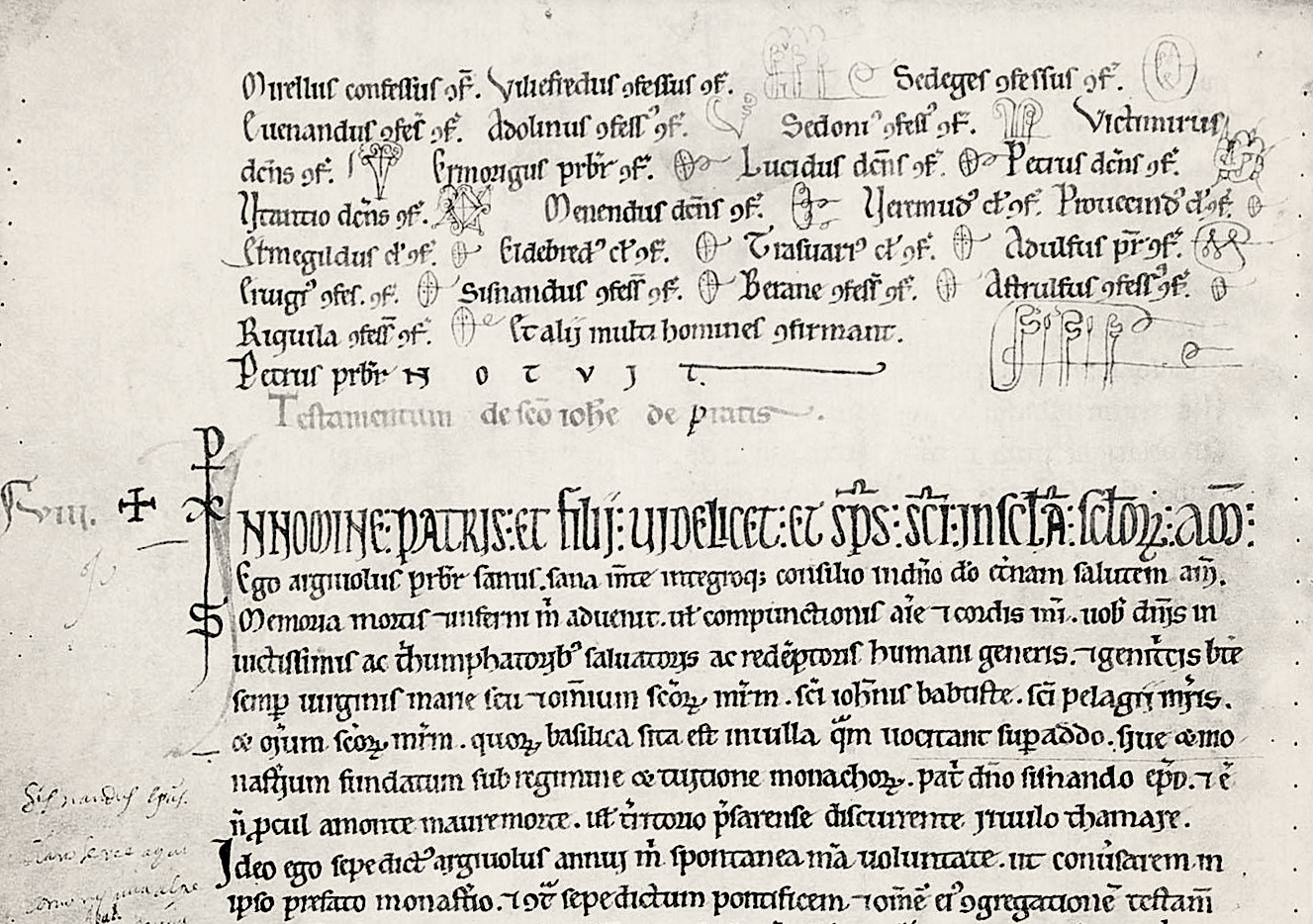
Germanic personal names in a 961 Galician document: Mirellus, Viliefredus, Sedeges, Evenandus, Adolinus, Sedoni, Victimirus, Ermoygus and others, with some Latin and Christian names

Germanic names were the most common personal names in Galicia-Portugal during the early and high Middle Ages, surpassing Christian and Roman names in number and popularity. The names, primarily of East Germanic origin, were used by the Suebi, Goths, Vandals and Burgundians. With the names, the Galicians inherited the Germanic onomastic system; a person used one name (sometimes a nickname or alias), with no surname, occasionally adding a patronymic. More than 1,000 such names have been preserved in local records. and in local toponyms.

Many of the Germanic names were composite, with the second element usually a noun with the same gender of the bearer. Others were hypocorisms formed from a composite name or deriving from it. Less frequently, a name was a noun or an adjective.

These names were transmitted to the Suevi with the usual Germanic rules of inheritance, which were variations (passing one element of the name; Rechiar was the son of Rechila, who was the son of Hermeric) and alliteration (names beginning with the same sound; Maldras was the son of the nobleman Masila). Full names were later transmitted from grandfather to grandson (commemoration), following a trend common until the present in most of western Europe.

=== Adaptations ===
In addition to the conversion of many Germanic endings into Romance or Latin endings, the names had phonetic adaptations such as the change of word stress from the first to the penultimate syllable, the conversion of most [þ] into [t] or [d] and the conversion of [h] into [k] before a consonant. [W] was initially preserved, although noted as [u] or [oy] before becoming [gw] (or, less commonly, [b]). These early inherited names underwent Western Romance and Galician changes from Latin, such as consonant lenition and palatalization. This contributed to a large number of variants in recorded names; Ostrofredus was recorded in Galicia-Portugal as Ortofredus, Ostofredo, Ostouredus, Ostrofedone, Stobredo and Strofredo.

== Names used by the Suevi ==
The following names, used by the Suevi of Gallaecia during the fifth and sixth centuries, were recorded in chronicles, inscriptions and acts of local ecclesiastical councils: Hermericus, Heremigarius, Rechila, Rechiarius, Agiulfus, Maldras, Massila, Framta, Frumarius, Rechimundus, Remismundus, Veremundus, Chararicus, Ariamirus, Ildericus, Theudomirus, Miro, Nitigisius, Uittimer, Anila, Remisol, Adoricus, Eboricus, Siseguntia f, Audeca, Malaricus, Pantardus, Neufila, Hildemirus, Commundus, Ermaricus, Sunila, Becila, Gardingus, Argiovitus, Gomedei, Rudemirus, Ermengontia f, Remisiwera f, Thuresmuda f, Suinthiliuba f.

Many of the names, used by kings such as Miro, Rechila and Theudemirus, were used for local toponyms: Mirón, Requián, Requiás and Receá, Tuimil and Toimil.

== Roots ==
The following is a list of the roots used to form Germanic personal names in Galicia-Portugal and northwestern Iberia. Many are related to war, victory, fame, boldness, strength and warlike qualities (bald-, funs-, hild-, gund-, nand-, rod-, seg-, send-), totemic animals (ar-, wulf-, ber-, ebur-) and weapons (brand-, bruni-, rand-, saru-); many others refer to knowledge, love and other peaceful qualities (fred-, leob-, mun-, ragi-, rad-, uin-). Some refer to the condition of ruler or master (fro-, ric-, vald-, Froya, Theodinus, Tructinus, Hendinus). Another group refers to the tribe, nation or country (conia-, fulc-, teod-, leod-, man-, truct-, gavi-, gogi-, kend-), and another appears to refer to Huns (Hun-), Suevi (Sav-), Goths (Gut-), Vandals (Vandal-), Celts (Vala-), Vendians/Slavs (Venet-), Galindians/Balths (Galind-), Franks (Frank-), Saxons (Sax-), Angles (Engl-), Danes (Dan-) and other peoples. Although some elements are identical to others found in Celtic anthroponymy (And-, Dag-, -mar, -riks), others appear to be adaptations of Latin words and names incorporated in the Danube region: Florens, Fortis, Crescens.

Forms marked with an asterisk are unrecorded and hypothetical. PGmc is an abbreviation for Proto-Germanic.

Name	Proto-Germanic root	Meaning	Examples
ab-	*abōn	"man"	Abbelinus
abr-	*abraz	"huge, strong"	Abragasia, Abrecan, Abronilli
ad- (later a-)	*haþuz	"battle, fight"	Adefonsus, Adeqisio, Aderedus, Aderico, Adesindus, Adica, Adiero, Adarius, Adila, Adileobo, Adileova, Adimirus, Adolinus, Adosinda
adal-	*aþalaz	"noble"	Adala, Addalinus, Adegaster, Adegundia (cp. Modern German "Adelgund(e)" = "Noble Fighter", or "Fighter for the Noble Cause", a feminine personal name), Adelasindo, Atalamondo
agi-, egi- (later ei-)	*agez; or *agjō	"fear"; or "edge"	Agimadus, Agio, Agiulfus, Aidio, Egeredus, Egica, Egila, Agila, Egildus, Agildus, Egilo, Ailo, Eigonza, Eileuva, Eilleus, Eimirus, Eindu, Eirigu, Eisindus, Haginus
agr-	perhaps *akraz	"field, open land"	Agrivulfum, Agromirus
aist-	*aistēn	"to give reverence"	Aistando
ala-	*ala	"all, wholly"	Alaguntia, Alamiro, Alaricus, Alarius, Alatrudia, Alobrida, Aloindo, Aloitus, Alvarus
alb-	*albaz	"elf"	Albiaster, Alvaricus, Alvatus
ald-	*aldaz	"old"	Aldemirus, Aldereto, Aldericus, Aldia, Aldinus
aldr-	*aldran	"age, life"	Aldras, Aldroitus
ali-	*aljaz	"other"	Alia, Alio, Aliaricus, Alifreda, Aliulfus, Aliverga, Alivergo, Aliverko, Aliverta, Alivertus, Alliefredus
am-, eim-, em-, en-	*haimaz	"dear"	Amingus, Eimoricus, Emila, Emilo, Emiso, Enaredus, Engildus, Entrudi
amal-	*amal-	"valiant, brave"	Amalilli
amed-	*amitaz	"continuous"	Amedon, Amedeiro
an-	*an-	"forefather"	Anagildus, Analsus, Anila, Anilo, Anualdus, Anulfo
and-, ant-	*anda	"throughout"	Andeatus, Andericus, Andiarius, Andifonso, Andila, Andilevo, Andilo, Anditio, Ando, Andosindus, Andulfus, Antemirus
ans-	*ansuz	"god"	Ansedeus, Ansemarus, Ansemirus, Ansemondus, Anseredo, Ansericus, Ansetrudia, Ansila, Ansileova, Ansilo, Ansiulphus, Ansiunda, Ansobrida, Ansoi, Anson, Ansuallo, Ansuario, Ansueto, Ansuildi, Ansvertus
aquis-	*akwesiz	"axe"	Aquisilde
ar-	*arnōn or *arwaz	"eagle" or "swift, ready"	Aragunti, Arosinda, Arosindus, Arualdus, Aruildi, Arumundo
ard-	*harduz or *arduz	"strong"/"hard" or "land"	Ardabastus, Ardericus, Ardaldus, Ardesendus, Ardilo, Ardulfus, Artemiro, Erdebredo
ari-, argi-	*harjaz	"army"	Arebuldo, Argeberto, Argefonsus, Argemirus, Argemondo, Argenilli, Argeredus, Argericus, Argesindus, Argeva, Argevadus, Argevitus, Argifonsa, Argifredus, Argileuva, Argilo, Argioi, Argiuolus, Argivastro, Ariulfus
aria-	*arjaz	"noble"	Arias, Ariastre
arn-	*arnuz	"eagle"	Arnadius, Arnaldus, Arnulfo
asc-	*askaz	"ash-tree"	Ascarigus, Ascarius, Asculfo
ase-	*haswaz	"grey"	Asemondus, Asileva, Asinoy, Asiulfus, Asofuda, Asoi, Asoredus
asp-	*aspōn	"aspen"	Asparigus
ast-	*astaz; or *austaz	"branch"; or "east"	Astaguerra, Asterigo, Astileuva, Astredo, Astualdu, Astulfus
astr-, ostr-, obstr-, stor-	*austraz	"east"	Astragis, Astragundia, Astramondus, Astratus, Astremarus, Astriverga, Astrogoto, Astruara, Astruario, Astruedu, Astruildi, Astrulfus, Obstrisinda, Ostamalus, Ostosia, Ostrofreda, Ostrofredo, Ostromirus, Astromirus, Estromirus, Storesindo
at- (later ad-)	*haþuz	"war"	Ataulfus, Atarius, Atericus, Aton
atan-, tan-	*aþnaz	"year"	Atanagildus, Atanaricus, Atanus, Tanina, Tanino, Atanitus, Tano, Tanoi, Tenildi
att-	*attōn	"father"	Atauldus, Attan, Attila, Attina
aud-, od-	*audaz	"wealth"	Audeca, Audesinda, Audila, Audinus, Audibertus, Audofredo, Audugus, Ausendus, Oda, Odemundus, Odamirus, Odericus, Odisclus, Odorica, Odoynus, Oduarius, Otualdo
aur-, or-	*auraz	"sand, sea"	Auresindus, Aurilli, Orosinda
aus-, os-	*aus-	"shining"	Osoarius, Osobredus, Osmundo, Osoredo, Osorico, Ausarigus, Osoy, Ossila, Ozandus
bad- (later ba-)	*badwō	"battle"	Badamundus, Bademirus, Badila, Badosindus
bait-	*baitaz	"ship, boat"	Baitus
bald-, balt-	*balþaz	"bold"	Baldemarius, Baldemirus, Balderedo, Balderico, Baldesindo, Baldila, Baldoi, Baldoigius, Baltarius, Baltino, Balto
bar-	*barô	"man"	Barilli, Barsilli, Baron, Baroncellus, Baronza, Barvaldus
bat-	*bataz	"good"	Bati, Batinus, Baton
baud-	*baudiz	"ruler"	Baudemirus, Baudesindus
baz-	*bazaz	"naked"	Bazarius
beg-, bag-, bec-, bac-	*bēgaz	"contest, quarrel"	Baga, Bega, Becilla, Bagesindus, Becosindo, Bagina, Bagino, Baquina, Baquino, Begica, Pegito
ber-	*berōn	"bear"	Bera, Bergundi, Berila, Berildi, Berosildi, Berilo, Berina, Berinus, Beroi, Berosindus, Berulfus
berg-, verg-	*bergaz	"shelter"	Bergas, Bergila, Vergilli, Vergina, Virgia
bern-	*bernuz	"bear"	Bernaldus
bert-, vert-	*berhtaz	"bright"	Berta, Bertamirus, Bertarius, Bertinus, Berto, Bertosinda, Bertuara, Betrulfus, Bretenandus, Vertila
bett-, bitt-	perhaps *bitraz	"bitter"	Betellus, Betericus, Bitilo, Bitto
bid-	*bidō	"request, prayer"	Biddi, Bidualdus
bil-, bel-	*bilaz or *bīþlan	"good" or "axe"	Bela, Belavrida, Belesarius, Belestrio, Belfonsus, Bellengo, Bellerto, Bello, Belloy, Belmirus, Billa
bland-	*blandiz (likely an adjective derived from *blandaną)	"to blend, make murky; to mix, mingle"	Blandila
bliv-	*blēwaz	"blue"	Bliviaricus
bon-	*bōniz	"prayer, petition"	Bonesindus, Bonilde, Bonimiro, Boninus, Boniza, Bonoi
bot-, but-	*bōtō	"good, profit"	Botan, Butila
brand-	*brandaz	"fire, sword"	Brandericus, Brandila, Brandinus, Brandiulfus, Brandon
brun-	*brunjōn	"breastplate"	Brunildi
burgal-	*Bulgar-	"Bulgarian?"	Burgala
ca-	*ga-	"with"	Camundus
canut-	*knūtaz	"bold"	Canuto
car-, kar-	*karō	"care"	Karmirus
carl-	*karlaz	"man"	Carlo
cart-, kart-	*krattaz	"cart, wagon"	Cartinus, Cartemirus
cen-	*kwenōn	"woman"	Cenabrida, Cenusenda
cend-, kend-, zend-, quint-	*kenþan	"child"	Cendamiro, Cendas, Cendon, Kenderedus, Kendulfus, Kindiverga, Quintila, Quintilo, Zendasindo
cens-, zens-	perhaps *zinz or *kwēniz	"tribute" or "woman"	Censerigus, Censoi, Zenzitus
conia-	*kunjan	"tribe, nation"	Coniaricus
cresc-	perhaps Latin crescens	"thrive"	Crescemirus
criz-	*krēsō	"dainty, food"	Crizila
dad-, ded-	*dēdiz	"deed"	Dada, Dadila, Dadilo, Dadinus, Dado, Dede
dag-, dac-	*dagaz	"day"	Dacamiro, Dacoi, Dagadrudia, Dacaredus, Dago, Daildus
dan-, da-	*daniz	"Dane"	Damiro, Damondus, Danila
dest-, test-	perhaps Latin dexter	"right, skilful"	Destoy, Destericus, Desteilli
doc-, duc-	*dōgiz	"day"	Docemiro, Ducila
dod-	no clear etymology; perhaps related to *dēdiz	"deed"	Dodo, Doda
dom-	*dōmaz	"judgement, ruling"	Domerigo
dulc-, dolc-	*dulgan or *dulgaz	"enmity" or "law, debt"	Dulcemirus, Dolcemondus
ebr-, ebur-, evor-	*eburaz	"boar"	Ebragundia, Ebreguldus, Ebregulfus, Ebrildi, Eburicus, Evorinus
elp-	*helpō	"help"	Elperico
elpand-	*elpandus	"elephant"	Elpandus
engl-	*angilaz	"Angles"	Engladius
engo-	*Ingwaz	"a god"	Engomirus, Engoredus, Engorigus
ens-	perhaps Latin ensis	"sword"	Ensalde, Iensericus
er-, her-	*heruz	"sword"	Erifonsus, Eroigius, Eruulfus, Herus
erm-, herm-	*ermenaz	"great"	Ermaldus, Ermedrudia, Ermefara, Ermefreda, Ermefredo, Ermegildus, Ermegis, Ermego, Ermegoto, Ermegotus, Ermegundia, Ermelindus, Ermemirus, Ermericus, Ermerote, Ermesinda, Ermiarius, Ermila, Ermildi, Ermileuva, Ermitus, Ermoleo, Ermosindus, Ermoygius, Ermulfo, Heremigarium, Hermecisclus, Hermellus
evo-	*ehwaz	"horse"	Euvenandus, Eva, Evorido, Evosindo, Ivolicus, Ibilli
faf-	*faff- (perhaps related to Indo-European *papp-)	"dad"	Faffila, Faffia
fag-	*fagenaz	"glad, joyful"	Fagila, Fagildus, Fagilo, Faginus
fald-	*faldiz	"fold, cloak"	Falderedo, Falgildus, Fardulfus
fand-	*fanþjōn	"infantryman"	Fandila, Fandina, Fandinus, Fannus
faq-, fak-	*fah-	"glad, joyful"	Facalo, Facco, Fakino, Faquilo
far-	*faran	"journey, ship"	Faregia, Farella, Farino, Farita, Farnus, Framiro, Fraredus, Frarigo, Fregulfus, Ferildi
fat-	*fatan	"cloth; vessel"	Fatu, Fateredus
fel-, fil-	*felu	"much, very"	Felellus, Felgirus, Felmiro, Filisteus, Filivertus, Filon
flor-	*flōraz or Latin florens	"floor" or "blooming, prosperous"	Floresindus
fof-	perhaps *fōþrą	"load, wagonload"	Fofo, Fofinus, Fofellus
fons-, funs-	*funsaz	"eager, ready"	Fonso, Fonsa, Fonsinus, Fonsellus
fradi-	*fraþīn	"efficacy"	Fradegundia, Fradila, Fradiulfus
fram-	*framaz	"forward; valiant"	Framila, Framilli, Framtan, Framuldo
frank-, franc-	*frankōn	"javelin; Frank"	Francellus, Francemirus, Franco, Francoi, Francolino, Frankila, Frankilo
fred-, frid-	*friþuz or *frīdaz	"peace" or "fair, beautiful"	Freda, Fredamundus, Fredario, Fredegundia, Fredemiro, Fredenanda, Fredenandus, Fredericus, Fredesinda, Fredilli, Fredisclus, Fredoaldus, Fredoindus, Fredosindus, Freduarius, Fredulfus, Fredus, Fridiverto
froa-, frau-, frog-, froy-, fron-	*frawjōn	"lord, master"	Froarengus, Fralenko, Frogeva, Frogildi, Frogina, Frogiulfo, Froiellus, Froila, Froilo, Froiloba, Froisenda, Froisendus, Fronildi, Fronosili, Fronuldo, Froya, Froyo, Froyslo, Fruaricus, Frugildus, Fruginus, Frauino, Frumirus, Frunilo
frum-, from-	*frumōn and *frumistaz	"foremost, first" and "first"	Fromista, Fremosilli, Fromaldus, Fromaricus, Fromildus, Fromosinda, Fromosindus, Fruma, Frumarius, Frumellus, Frumildi
fulc-	*fulkan	"crow, army"	Fulcaredus
gad-, gat-	*gadōn	"comrade"	Gademiro, Gadenanda, Gaton
gael-, gel-	*gailaz	"merry"	Gaella, Gelmiro, Geloira
gaf-, gef-, geb-	*gebō	"gift"	Gaffo, Gebuldus, Gefera
gaid-	*gaidō	"spearhead, arrowhead"	Gaidus
gaif-	*waibjanan	"to surround"	Gaifar
galind-, kalend-	*galind-	"Galindian" (a Baltic people)	Galindus, Kalendus
gan-	perhaps gan	"enchantment"	Ganati, Ganilli, Ganiti, Ganoi
gand-	*gandaz	"wand, staff"	Gandila, Gandinus, Gandulfo, Gandus
gard-	*gardaz	"house, enclosure"	Gardingus, Gardulfus
gas-, ges-, gis-, ger-, gir-	*gaizaz	"spear"	Gasuildi, Gera, Gesa, Gero, Geserigus, Gesmira, Germira, Gesmiro, Gesulfus, Ierulfus, Giraldus, Gismundus, Germundus, Gisovredus, Gisvado
gast-	*gastiz	"guest"	Gastre
gaud-, caud-	no clear etymology; perhaps *gaut- or Latin gaudeo	"Goth" or "rejoice"	Caudemirus, Gauderigus, Gaudesindo, Gaudilani, Gaudilli, Gaudinas
gav-, gau-, gogi-, cogi-, gagi-, cagi-, kegi-,	*gaujan	"district"	Cagildo, Cagita, Cagitus, Gagica, Gaufredus, Gaulfus, Gavila, Gavina, Gavinus, Gega, Gegitus, Gigelus, Gogia, Gogilli, Gogina, Gogitus, Gogius, Goymundus, Guimundus, Guginus, Gugivertus, Guimirus, Guiricus, Guisenda, Goysenda, Guisindus, Kagilda, Keila
geld-, gild-, kelt-	*geldan	"tribute, recompense"	Geldemirus, Gildaricus, Gildo, Keltoi
gen-, ian-, ion-	*gennan	"beginning"	Genildi, Ionilde, Genlo, Genobreda, Gemundus, Ianardo, Ionarico
gend-	perhaps *gantijaną	"To make whole; make complete"	Gendo, Gendina
get-, git-		"glory"	Geda, Getericus, Getilli, Getina, Getoy, Gidiberto, Gitarius, Gitesindus, Gitio
gisl-, viscl-, cisl-	*gīslaz	"hostage"	Cisla, Viclavara, Viscaverga, Visclafredo, Visclamirus, Visclamundus, Visclario
givel-	*geb(e)lōn	"skull, gable"	Givellan
glad-	*gladaz	"bright, glad"	Gladila
god-, gud- (later go-, gu-)	*gōdaz	"good"	Godefredus, Godegildus, Godella, Godellus, Godemiro, Godenanda, Godesinda, Godoigia, Godomundus, Gudenandus, Guderedus, Guderigo, Gudesindus, Gudesteus, Gudigeba, Gudila, Gudileuva, Gudilo, Gudilulfo, Gudiverga
gol-	*gōljanan or *gōlaz	"to greet" or "pride"	Golinus, Gollo
gom-, gum-	*gumōn	"man"	Gomadus, Gomaldo, Gomaredus, Gomarigus, Gomesindo, Gomita, Gomulfus, Gomundus, Guma, Gumarius, Gumellus, Gumila, Gumito
gram-	*gramaz	"furious"	Gramila
gran-	*grannaz or *granō	"slim, slender" or "moustache"	Granilo
grim-	*grīmōn	"mask, helmet"	Grima, Grimaldus
gris-	*grīsanan or *grīsaz	"to dread" or "grey"	Grisulfus, Gresomarus
guald-	*waldaz	"powerful, mighty"	Gualdarius, Gualdeo
guandal-	*wandilaz	"Vandal"	Guandalisco, Guandalar
guld-	*wulþuz	"splendour"	Goldegildo, Goldredo, Guldarius, Gulderigus
guldr-, goltr-	*wulþraz	"wonderful, precious"	Goldregodo, Gulderes, Gualdramirus
gulf-, golf-	*wulfaz	"wolf"	Golfarico, Gulfarius, Gulfemirus
gund-, gunt-, gunz-, cunt-, gond-	*gunthz	"fight"	Gonceria, Gondella, Gondenanda, Gonso, Gonta, Gontemondus, Gontere, Gonderes, Gontoi, Gontualdo, Gonza, Guncitus, Gundarius, Gundebredo, Gundebrida, Gundelinus, Gundemarus, Gunderamnus, Gunderedo, Gunderigus, Gunderona, Gundertia, Gundesindus, Gundifortis, Gundigeva, Gundila, Gundilo, Gundisalva, Gundisalvus, Gundiscalcus, Gundivadus, Gundivaldo, Gundivera, Gundiverga, Gundon, Gundulfo, Guntato, Guntedrudia, Guntellus, Guntemirus, Gunterotis, Gunti, Guntiesclo, Guntigio, Guntilli, Gundesilli, Guntina, Guntinus, Guntuigia
gut- (later god-)	*gutōn	"Goth"	Gotesendus, Goto, Gota, Goton, Gudegisus, Gutellus, Gutemirus, Gutemondo, Gutilli, Gutilo, Gutina, Gutinus, Guto, Guta, Gutumarus
hend-, ind-, hand-	probably related to Burgundian hendinus	"king"	Endulfus, Hamdino, Indisclus
hild-, ild-, eld-, ald-	*heldjō	"battle"	Alderedus, Alduarius, Eldan, Eldebona, Eldegeses, Eldegotus, Eldegundia, Eldemirus, Eldemundus, Eldesinda, Eldesindus, Eldigia, Eldinus, Eldivercus, Eldivertus, Eldo, Eldoigius, Elleca, Ildebredus, Ildefonsus, Ilderigus, Ildiverga, Ildoi, Ildoncia, Ildras, Ilduara, Ildulfus
ik-, eq-, ig-	perhaps *eka	"I"	Igo, Ika, Ikila
it-, id-	(no clear etymology)		Idiverto, Itila, Itilo, Itimondo, Itaultus
iuv-, iub-	no clear etymology; perhaps Latin iuvenis "young" or metathesis of *webaną "to weave" (cf. *wesuz → ius-, *westan → iust-)	"young" or "weave"	Iovellinus, Iubarius, Iubinus, Iuuisclus, Iuvatus, Iuvericus, Iuvila, Iuvitus
ket-, qued-, quid-	to PGmc *kweþanan	"to say"	Kedisilo, Ketemera, Ketenando, Keti, Ketoi, Quedesendo, Quedulfus, Quidemirus, Quidericus, Quitarius, Quitoi
lal-, lel-, lil-	probably Latin lallus	"lullaby"	Lalla, Lalli, Lallina, Lallinus, Lallus, Lelino, Leliola, Lilliola, Lelli, Lilla, Lilli, Lillo, Lilla
leo-	*hlewaz	"glory, renown"	Leomirus
leode-, leude-	*leudiz	"man, people"	Ledla, Leodarius, Leodefredus, Leodegasti, Leodegisius, Leodegundia, Leodemiro, Leodemundo, Leoderigus, Leodesindo, Leodeuigus, Leodo, Leodulfus
leov-, leub-	*leubaz	"beloved"	Leovaldo, Leovegildus, Leovegoto, Leoveredus, Leoverigus, Leoverona, Leoverto, Leovesenda, Leovesindus, Leovilli, Leovus, Leuba, Leubegutus, Liuvilo, Lovoi, Lubellus, Lubila, Lubinus
lot-	*hludaz	"famous"	Lotarius
mact- (later meit-)	*mahtiz	"power, might"	Meitinus, Matericus, Mectubrida, Meitilli, Meitulfus
mag-	*magenan	"might, power"	Magan, Magila, Magitus, Maniaricus, Maniarius, Magnitus, Maniulfus, Megildus
mal-	unclear etymology, perhaps related to *malanan	"to grind"	Malaricus, Malaredus
malasc-	perhaps *malskaz	"proud"	Malasco
maldr-	perhaps *maldriz	"flour"	Maldras
man- (later ma-)	*manan	"fellow"	Manildi, Manusildi, Manileuva, Manilla, Maninus, Manosenda, Manosindus, Manualdus, Manulfus, Menegundia
mand-, mant-	*manþaz	"kind"	Mandila, Mandinus, Mandulfo, Mantellus
mann- (later man-)	*mannz	"man"	Manitus, Manna, Mannello, Manni, Manno, Manoim, Mansuara
marc-	*markō or *marhaz	"region, border" or "horse"	Marco, Marcosendus, Marcitus
mart-	perhaps *marþuz	"marten"	Martila
matl-, matr-	*maþlan	"assembly"	Matrosindus, Matrinus, Matroi
maur- (later mour-)	perhaps *mauraz or Latin maurus	"ant" or "Moor"	Mauran, Maurentan, Maurican, Mauron
medum- (later meom-)	*medumaz	"middling, moderate"	Meduma
mer-, mir-, mar-	*mērjaz	"famous"	Margilli, Merila, Meroildi, Mervigius, Mira, Mirella, Mirellus, Miro, Mirosinda, Mirualdo
mod-, mud-	*mōdaz	"anger, wrath"	Modericus, Moderido, Modildus, Modilli, Mudario, Mudila
mun-, mon-	*muniz	"thought"	Monefonsus, Monobredo, Munisclus
mund-, mond-	*mundō	"protection"	Monderico, Mondoi, Mundellus, Mundila, Mundildus, Mundinus, Mundus
nand-, nant-	*nanþaz	"bold, courageous"	Nandamundus, Nandaricus, Nandinus, Nandoi, Nandulfo, Nandus, Nantemiro, Nantildo
naust-	*naustą	"a ship-shed, boathouse"	Naustus, Naustila
neu-, nu-	*neujaz	"new"	Nuilla, Nuillo, Neufila
nit-	*nīþaz or *niþjaz	"hatred" or "kinsman"	Nitigisius
not-	*nauthiz	"need"	Notarius
of-	*ubjōn	"abundance"	Offa, Ofila, Offilo
old-	*hulþaz	"kind, clement"	Olda, Oldaricus
opp-	perhaps *ōbjanan (related to Latin opus "work")	"to celebrate solemnly"	Oppa, Oppila
osd-	*huzdan	"treasure"	Osdulfus
pant-	*pandan or *banti	"pledge" or "district"	Pantardus, Panto, Pantinus
pap-, pep-	no clear etymology; perhaps *pipo or Latin pāpiliō	"pipe or flute (wind instrument)" or "butterfly, moth"	Papellus, Papitus, Pappinus, Pappo, Pepi, Pipericus, Pipinus
penn-, pen-	perhaps Latin penna	"feather"	Penetrudia, Penus, Pennino
rad-, rat-	*rēdaz	"advice"	Rademirus, Rademundus, Radesindus, Radulfus, Ratario, Retericus
ragi-, ragn- (later rei-)	*raginą	"advice, decision"	Ragesenda, Ragesindus, Ragian, Ragifredo, Ragimiru, Ragito, Ragolfus, Raiola, Raiolo, Reginaldus, Reimondus, Reirigus
rak-	*rakan or *wrakaz	"reason, talk" or "pursuer"	Rakericus
ram-	*rammaz	"strong; ram"	Ramila, Ramon, Ramulo
rana-, rani- (later ra-)	probably *rannjanan	"to run"	Ranarius, Ranemira, Ranemirus, Ranemundus, Ranilo, Ranisclus, Raniverga, Raniverta, Ranivertus, Ranosenda, Ranosindus, Ranualdus, Ranulfus
rand-, rant-	*randaz	"shield"	Randemirus, Randili, Randinus, Rando, Randuarius, Randulfus, Rendericus
raup-	*raupjanan	"to plunder, to spoil"	Rauparius
rec-, req-, ric-	*rīkjaz	"mighty, noble"	Recaredus, Reccafredus, Recebrida, Recedrudia, Recelli, Recemera, Recemirus, Recemundus, Recesenda, Recesindus, Recesuinda, Recesuindus, Rechiarius, Recilli, Requilli, Recinus, Recualdus, Regaulfus, Reicionda, Rekeritus, Requefonsus, Rezevera, Ricardo, Riquila, Riquilo, Riquilodo, Riquoi
ref-	*hrabnaz	"crow"	Refulfo
rem-	*remez	"rest, calmness"	Remegildus, Remesario, Remesilli, Remesindus, Remestro, Remismundus, Remisol, Rimionda
rest-	*ristiz	"rising up"	Restericus
rod-, rud-	*hrōþaz	"fame"	Rodemirus, Rodevertus, Rodosildi, Rodougus, Roelindus, Rouvredo, Rudericus, Rudesindus, Rudila, Rudilo
rom-, rum-	*hrōmaz	"fame"	Romarigus, Romila, Rumario
sala- (later sa-)	*salaz	'hall, dwelling'	Salamirus, Salamarus, Salla
sand-, sant-	*sanþaz	"truth, justice"	Sandinus, Sando, Santimirus
sar-	*sarwan	"arm, armament"	Saroi, Saruilli
sax- (later seix-)	*sahsan and *sahxōn	"knife" and "Saxon"	Saxo, Seixomir
scap-	*skapan	"vessel"	Scapa
scarc-	*skalkaz	"servant; sword"	Scarcila
scer-	*skīriz	"pure"	Scerinus
sed-	*seduz	"custom"	Sedino
sedeg-	*sedīgaz	"well-bred, well-behaved"	Sedeges
seg-, sag-, sig- (later se-, si-)	*segez	"victory"	Sagatus, Sagildo, Sagulfus, Segemundus, Segesindo, Segestro, Segga, Segika, Segimarus, Segioi, Segomirus, Seguinus, Sigeberto, Sigefrida, Sigeredus, Sigericus, Sigesgundia, Sigesinda, Sigila, Sigu, Segio
sel-	*sēliz	"good, kind"	Selmirus, Seloi
selv-	*selbaz	"self"	Selvas, Selvatus
sen-, sin-	*senaz	"ever, old"	Senatrudia, Seniberta, Senildi, Senuita, Senuldo, Sinerta, Sinifredus
send-, sent-	*senþaz or *swenþaz	"companion" or "strong"	Senda, Sendamirus, Sendello, Sendericus, Senderiga, Sendina, Sendinus, Sendoi, Sendon, Sendredus, Senduitu, Sendulfus, Senta, Sentarius, Sindamundus, Sindi, Sindigis, Sindila, Sindileuba, Sindilo, Sindiverga, Sindo, Sinduara
ser-	*swēraz	"valued, honoured"	Seririgo, Serulfus, Servaldus
sigunt-	*sebunþōn	"seventh"	Sigunterigo
sis-, ses-	perhaps related to Old High German sisu	"funerary song, ritual"	Sescutus, Sesericus, Sesina, Sesmiro, Sesmundo, Sesoi, Sesuito, Sisa, Sisebutus, Sisegundia, Sisellus, Sisildus, Sisileova, Sisilli, Sisilu, Sisinus, Sisiverta, Sisiverto, Sisivigia, Sisnandus, Sisualdo, Sisuita, Sisuldus, Sisulfus, Zisila
sit-	*setan	"seat"	Sitagellus, Siti, Sitividis
smer-	*smerwōn	"fat"	Smerlo
sontr-, suntr-	*sunþrjaz	"southern"	Sontrilli, Suntria
span-	*spananan	"to lead"	Spanaricu, Spanarius, Spanilo, Spanosendo, Spanubrida
spand-	perhaps *spannanan	"to join"	Spandaricus
spar-	*sparwaz	"sparrow"	Espallo, Sparuildi
speraut-	*spreutanan	"to sprout"	Sperautan
spint-	*spenþa	"fat"	Spintilo, Spintino
spod- (later espo-)	perhaps *spōdiz	"prosperity, success"	Spodemiro, Spoderigo
stan-	*stainaz	"stone"	Stanildi
stod-	perhaps *stōdą	"a herd of horses"	Stodildi
strouc-	*streukanan	"to stroke"	Strouco
suab-, sab-, sav-, sev-	*swēbaz	"Suebian"	Sabaredus, Sabegoto, Sabila, Sabita, Sabitus, Savaracus, Savaricus, Savegodus, Savildi, Savoy, Sevegildo, Suabas, Suavar
sue-	*swe-	"own"	Sueredus, Suimirus
sund-, sunt-	*sunþiz	"south"	Sundemirus, Suntarius
suni-, seni-, sani-, soni-	*sunjō	"truth"	Sanigia, Seniaredus, Seniulfus, Sonegildus, Songimera, Soniaricus, Sonifreda, Sonita, Suniagisclus, Suniarius, Suniemirus, Sunila, Sunildi, Sunilo, Sunitus
sunn-	*sunnan	"sun"	Sonna
tanc-	*þankaz	"favor, grace"	Tancila, Tancinus, Tancus, Tanquilli
tanth-	*tanþz	"tooth"	Tandus
tat-, zaz-	*taitaz	"radiant; bright"	Tata, Tatina, Zazitus, Zazo
teg-	*þegnaz	"thane, freeman"	Tegila, Tegino, Tegio, Tegitus
teq-	perhaps *tēkaną or *tehwō by alteration of H to K	"to touch, to grasp" or "order, array"	Tequilo, Texilli
teud-, teod-, tod-, ted- (later teo-)	*þeudō and *þeudanaz	"nation" and "king"	Teadario, Tederona, Tedoy, Teobaldus, Teoda, Teodefredo, Teodegildo, Teodegondia, Teodemirus, Teodemundus, Teodenandus, Teoderados, Teoderago, Teoderedus, Teodericus, Teodesinda, Teodesindus, Teodeverga, Teodiberta, Teodila, Teodildi, Teodilo, Teodinus, Teodisclus, Teodiu, Teodoriga, Teodulfus, Teton, Teudecutus, Teudisila, Theodivertus, Tiotevadus, Todegia, Todegogia, Toduldo, Tota, Tudiscaisum
tit-, tet-	*taitōn	"little boy"	Tetina, Titila
tors-, turis-	*þursaz	"giant"	Torsario, Turisulfus
trad-	*þrēdaz	"quick"	Tradus, Tradinus
tras-	*þrasō	"move, fight"	Tracinus, Trasaricus, Trasarius, Trasavara, Trasendus, Trasido, Trasilli, Trasiuadus, Trasmira, Trasmiro, Trasmondo, Trasoi, Trassemutus, Trasuarius, Trasuinda, Trasulfus
trast-	*traustaz	"strong"	Trastalo, Trastelus, Trastemiro, Trastidia, Trastina, Trastulfus, Trastivigia
trevu-	*trewwaz	"faithful"	Trevuleus
truct- (later troit-)	*druhtiz, later *druhtīnaz	"people, army" and "lord, master"	Tructinus, Tructa, Tructemiro, Tructemondo, Tructericus, Tructesinda, Tructesindus, Tructilli, Tructus, Truitellus, Truitero
trud-	*drūdaz	"friend, beloved"	Truda, Trudigildus, Trudildi, Trudilo, Trudina, Trudinus, Trudulfus
tund-, tunt-	*tunþuz	"tooth"	Tumtuldo, Tundulfus, Tuntila
un-, on-	*hūnaz	"cub" and "Hun"	Uniscus, Unisco, Onaredus, Onegilda, Onegildo, Onemirus, Onesindus, Onildi, Unilli, Onoricus, Onosinda, Unemundus, Unileus, Unilla
vad-, guad- (later gua-, ga-)	*wadaz	"ford"	Guadla, Uaduuara, Vadamundus, Vademirus
vala-, guala-, quala-	*walaz; or *walhaz	"the slain, battlefield"; or "Celt"	Gualamarius, Gualamira, Gualamirus, Qualatrudia, Qualavara, Valarius
vamb-	*wambō	"belly"	Vamba
vand-, guand-	*wanduz	"wand, rod"	Guanadildi, Guandila, Guandilo, Guantaldus, Vandino, Vuanda
ven-, guin-	*weniz	"friend"	Guina, Guinilli, Uenildi, Guinus
venet-, guend-, vened-, genit-	*wenedaz	"Vendian, Slav"	Genitigia, Guendo, Venedario, Venetricus
ver-	*wērō	"pledge; true"	Vera, Vermundus, Veremudus
via-	perhaps *wīhan	"temple"	Viaricus, Viamundus
vidr-, vedr-, quitr-	*wiþra	"against"	Quitre, Vederoi, Vedragese, Vedrailli, Vidragildus, Vidraldus, Vidramirus
vidub-	*widuwaz	"widowed"	Vidubas
vig-, veg-	*wīgaz	"fighter"	Uegitus, Vigila, Vigilli, Vigilo, Vigiltu, Vigoy
vil-, guil-, quil-	*weljōn	"will"	Guiliberto, Quella, Uiliaredus, Uilloi, Gilloi, Vilesinda, Viliamirus, Vilian, Viliaricu, Viliarius, Viliatus, Viliefredus, Vilifonsus, Viligus, Vilitro, Viliulfus, Vilivado, Villavaria, Villelmus, Villisendo, Villo
vim-	*wīgą	"fight, battle"	Guimarigus, Uimaredus, Viman, Vimara
vinc-	*wenkjanan	"to move sideways, to avoid"	Venze, Vincila
vis-, ius-	*wesuz	"good"	Iusuandus, Uisulfus, Usegildus, Visaldus, Visaridus, Visellu
visand-	*wisundaz	"bison"	Visandus
vist-, iust-	*westan	"west"	Iusterigo, Iustiarius, Iustila, Vistemundo, Vistesinda, Iustesenda, Vistiberga, Vistisclo, Vistivara, Wistiz
vistr-, iustr-	*westraz	"westward"	Iustri, Uistrello, Uistrileuba, Vestregoti, Visterla, Visterlo, Vistragildus, Vistramundi, Vistraricus, Vistrarius, Vistravara, Vistravarius, Vistregia, Vistremiro, Vistresindus, Vistrevius, Vistrildi, Vistresilli, Vistroi
vit- (later vid-)	*witan	"knowledge"	Uita, Vidila, Vitinus, Vitisclus
vitt-, vict (later vit-)	*witjan	"comprehension"	Uiti, Uittina, Victemirus, Victericus, Vitarius, Vitas, Vitila, Vitildus, Vitiza, Vittimero
viv, oyv-	*wīban	"wife, woman"	Oyeuio, Vivildus
viz-, quiz-	unclear etymology, the alteration of v to qu suggests that the original word started with an hw- cluster, perhaps *hwis	"to hiss, to rush, make a rushing sound"	Quizino, Viza, Vizamundus, Vizila, Vizoi

=== Feminine roots ===
Elements common as the second syllable of feminine names include:

Name	Proto-Germanic root	Meaning	Examples
-berta, -verta	*berhtō	"bright"	Aliverta, Raniverta, Sisiverta, Teodiverta
-berga, -verga	*bergō	"shelter"	Aliverga, Astriverga, Gundiverga, Ildiverga, Kindiverga, Raniverga, Sindiverga, Teodeverga, Viscaverga, Vistiberga
-drudia/-trudia (later -druia)	*drūd-jō	"friend, beloved"	Alatrudia, Aniedrudia, Ansetrudia, Dagadrudia, Entrudi, Ermedrudia, Guntedrudia, Penetrudia, Qualatrudia, Recedrudia, Senatrudia
-fara	*farō	"journey"	Ermefara
-freda/-breda/-brida/-vrida	*friþ-ō	"peace"	Alifreda, Alobrida, Ansobrida, Belavrida, Genobreda, Gundebrida, Mectubrida, Recebrida, Sigefrida, Sonifreda, Spanubrida
-fonsa	*funs-ō	"eager, ready"	Argifonsa
-go	*gauj-ō	"region, district"	Ermego
-geba/-geva (later -eva)	*gebō	"gift"	Argeva, Frogeva, Gudigeba, Gundigeva
-gelda	*geld-ō	"reward"	Kagilda, Onegilda
-isila	*-gīsl-ō	"hostage, sprout"	Teudisila
-goto/-godo	*gaut-ō	"Goth woman"	Astrogoto, Ermegoto, Goldregodo, Leovegoto, Sabegoto, Vestregoti
-cuntia/-cundia/-guntia/-gundia/-gunza/-onda	*gunþ-jō	"fight"	Adegundia, Alaguntia, Ansiunda, Aragunti, Astragundia, Bergundi, Ebragundia, Eigonza, Eldegundia, Ermegundia, Fradegundia, Helaguntia, Ildoncia, Leodegundia, Menegundia, Reicionda, Rimionda, Sigesgundia, Siseguntia, Teodogoncia, Treitegundia
-ildi, -illi	*heldiz	"battle"	Abronilli, Amalilli, Ansuildi, Argenilli, Aruildi, Astruildi, Aurilli, Barsilli, Barilli, Berildi, Berosildi, Bonilde, Brunildi, Desteilli, Donadildi, Ebrildi, Ebrailli, Ermildi, Framilli, Fremosilli, Frogildi, Fronildi, Fronosili, Frumildi, Ganilli, Gasuildi, Gaudilli, Genildi, Ionilde, Getilli, Gogilli, Guanadildi, Guananildi, Guinilli, Uenildi, Guntilli, Gundesilli, Gutilli, Ibilli, Leovilli, Manildi, Manusildi, Margilli, Meitilli, Meroildi, Modilli, Onildi, Unilli, Randili, Recilli, Requilli, Remesilli, Rodosildi, Saruilli, Sarilli, Savildi, Senildi, Sisilli, Sontrilli, Sparuildi, Stanildi, Stodildi, Sunildi, Tanquilli, Tenildi, Teodildi, Texilli, Trasilli, Trasuildi, Tructilli, Trudildi, Vedrailli, Vergilli, Vigilli, Vistrildi, Vistresilli
-leuba, -leova	*leub-ō	"beloved"	Adileova, Ansileova, Argileuva, Asileva, Astileuva, Eileuva, Ermileuva, Froiloba, Gudileuva, Manileuva, Sindileuba, Sisileova, Uistrileuba
-mira, -mera	*mēr-ō	"famous, excellent"	Gesmira, Germira, Giudimira, Gualamira, Ketemera, Ranemira, Recemera, Songimera, Trasmira
-nanda (later -anda)	*nanþ-ō	"bold, courageous"	Fredenanda, Gadenanda, Godenanda, Gondenanda
-rica (later -riga)	*rīk-ō	"ruler"	Odorica, Senderiga, Teodoriga
-rotis	*rōt-iz	"glad, cheerful"	Gunterotis
-rona	*rūnō	"mystery, secret"	Gunderona, Leoverona, Tederona
-senda, -sinda	*senþ-ō; or *swenþ-ō	"companion"; or "strong"	Adosinda, Arosinda, Audesinda, Bertosinda, Cenusenda, Eldesinda, Ermesinda, Eudisinda, Fredesinda, Froisenda, Fromosinda, Godesinda, Guisenda, Goysenda, Leovesenda, Manosenda, Mirosinda, Obstrisinda, Onosinda, Orosinda, Peruisenda, Ragesenda, Ranosenda, Recesenda, Sigesinda, Teodesinda, Tructesinda, Vilesinda, Vistesinda, Iustesenda
-suenda, -suinda	*swenþ-ō	"strong"	Recesuinda, Trasuinda
-vara	*warō	"care, attention; possession"	Astruara, Bertuara, Ilduara, Mansuara, Qualavara, Rezevera, Sinduara, Trasavara, Uaduuara, Visclavara, Villavaria, Vistivara, Vistravara
-vera	*wērō	"pledge, plight"	Gelvira, Gundivera
-vigia, -igia	*wīg-jō	"fighter"	Genitigia, Godoigia, Guntuigia, Sanigia, Sisivigia, Trastivigia, Vistregia
-vita, -vidis	probably related to PGmc *witjan	"knowledge, comprehension"	Senuita, Sisuita, Sitividis

Suffixes used to derive hypocoristic feminine names include:

- -alo: Facalo, Trastalo
- -ilo (later -io): Acilo, Andilo, Anilo, Ansilo, Ardilo, Argilo, Berilo, Bitilo, Cisilo, Dadilo, Egilo, Ailo, Emilo, Esmerlo, Espallo, Fagilo, Faquilo, Frankilo, Froilo, Frunilo, Genilo, Genlo, Geodilo, Gracilo, Granilo, Guandilo, Gudilo, Gundilo, Gutilo, Itilo, Liuvilo, Nisilo, Nuillo, Nunnilo, Quintilo, Ranilo, Riquilo, Rudilo, Sindilo, Sisilu, Spanilo, Spintilo, Sunilo, Tafila, Teodilo, Tequilo, Trudilo, Vigilo, Visterlo
- -ina: Bagina, Baquina, Berina, Fandina, Frogina, Gavina, Gendina, Getina, Gogina, Guntina, Gutina, Lallina, Nunnina, Sendina, Sesina, Tanina, Tidina, Tetina, Trastina, Trudina, Vergina, Zanina
- -ita (later -ida): Acita, Cagita, Farita, Gomita, Nunnita, Sabita, Sonita
- -ella: Farella, Gondella, Mirella, Nunella

=== Masculine roots ===
Elements common as the second syllable of masculine names include:

Name	Proto-Germanic root	Meaning	Examples
-badus, -vadus	*badwō	"fight"	Argevadus, Gisvado, Gundivadus, Tiotevadus, Trasiuadus, Vilivado
-baldus, -valdus	*balþaz	"bold"	Gundivaldo, Teobaldus
-bertus, -vertus	*berhtaz	"bright"	Alivertus, Ansvertus, Argeberto, Audibertus, Eldivertus, Filivertus, Fridiverto, Geodevertus, Gidiberto, Gugivertus, Guiliberto, Idiverto, Leoverto, Ranivertus, Rodevertus, Sigeberto, Sisiverto, Theodivertus
-butus	*bōtō	"profit, usefulness"	Sisebutus
-fredus, -fridus, -bredus, -vredus (later -vreu)	*friþuz	"peace"	Alliefredus, Argifredus, Audofredo, Erdebredo, Ermefredo, Geodefredo, Gisovredus, Godefredus, Gundebredo, Ildebredus, Leodefredus, Monobredo, Osobredus, Ostrofredo, Ragifredo, Reccafredus, Rouvredo, Sinifredus, Teodefredo, Viliefredus, Visclafredo
-funsus, -fonsus, -bonsus	*funsaz	"eager, ready"	Adefonsus, Andifonso, Argefonsus, Belfonsus, Erifonsus, Ildefonsus, Monefonsus, Requefonsus, Vilifonsus
-fortis	probably Latin fortis	"strong"	Gundifortis
-gis, -ges, -geses, -garius	*gaizaz	"spear"	Adeqisio, Astragis, Eldegeses, Ermegis, Felgirus, Gudegisus, Heremigarium, Leodegisius, Nitigisius, Sindigis, Tudiscaisum, Vedragese
-gaster, -bastus	*gastiz	"guest"	Adegaster, Albiaster, Algaster, Ardabastus, Argivastro, Donagastro, Leodegasti
-gotus, -godus	*gautaz	"Goth"	Eldegotus, Ermegotus, Leubegutus, Savegodus, Sescutus, Teudecutus, Visigotus
-gogia	*gaujan	"district"	Todegogia
-gildus, -ildus	*geld-az	"reward"	Anagildus, Aquisildus, Atanagildus, Cagildo, Daildus, Donegildus, Egildus, Agildus, Engildus, Ermegildus, Fagildus, Falgildus, Fredilli, Fromildus, Frugildus, Gaudilti, Geodegildus, Goldegildo, Leovegildus, Megildus, Modildus, Mundildus, Nantildo, Onegildo, Pabregildus, Pederagildu, Remegildus, Sagildo, Sevegildo, Sisildus, Sitagellus, Sonegildus, Tarildus, Teodegildo, Tudeildus, Trenelldus, Trudigildus, Uanagildi, Usegildus, Vidragildus, Vigiltu, Vistragildus, Vitildus, Vivildus
-gisclus, -isclus	-*gīslaz	"hostage, sprout"	Fredisclus, Guntiesclo, Hermecisclus, Indisclus, Iuuisclus, Kedisilo, Munisclus, Odisclus, Ranisclus, Suniagisclus, Teodisclus, Vistisclo, Vitisclus
-ardus	*harduz	"strong", "hard"	Ianardo, Pantardus, Ricardo, Guntato (Modern German "Gunthard" = "Strong in fight")
-arius (later -eiro)	*harjaz	"army, host"	Adarius, Agarius, Alarius, Amedeiro, Andiarius, Ascarius, Atarius, Aunarius, Baltarius, Bazarius, Belesarius, Bertarius, Cufarius, Donazarius, Ermiarius, Fredario, Frumarius, Gaifarius, Gitarius, Gualdarius, Guldarius, Gulfarius, Gumarius, Gundarius, Iubarius, Iustiarius, Leodarius, Lotarius, Magnarius, Mudario, Notarius, Olcarius, Quitarius, Ranarius, Ratario, Rauparius, Rechiarius, Remesario, Rumario, Sentarius, Spanarius, Suavarius, Suniarius, Suntarius, Teadario, Torsario, Trasarius, Truitero, Uandalarius, Valarius, Venedario, Viliarius, Visclario, Vistrarius, Vitarius
-atus (later -ado)	*haþuz	"war"	Alvatus, Andeatus, Astratus, Eugienadus, Ganati, Gomadus, Guanatus, Guntato, Iuvatus, Sagatus, Selvatus, Viliatus
-elmus	*helmaz	"helm"	Villelmus
-leus	*hlewaz	"renown"	Eilleus, Trevuleus, Unileus
-ramnus	*hrabnaz	"crow"	Gunderamnus
-ringus, -lenco	*hrengaz	"ring"	Froaringus, Fralenko
-licus	*laikaz	"dance, game, battle"	Ivolicus
-lindus	*lenþaz	"gentle, mild"	Ermelindus, Roelindus, Teodelindus
-leobo, -levo	*leubaz	"dear"	Adileobo, Andilevo
-marius, -marus (later -meiro)	*mērjaz	"great, famous"	Ansemarus, Astremarus, Baldemarius, Gresumarus, Gualamarius, Gundemarus, Gutumarus, Leudemarus, Salamarus, Segimarus, Zamarius
-madus	*maþ-	"good"	Agimadus
-mirus, -mero	*mērjaz	"famous, excellent"	Acimiro, Adimirus, Agromirus, Alamiro, Aldemirus, Ansemirus, Antemirus, Ariamiro, Argemirus, Artemiro, Aumiro, Bademirus, Baldemirus, Baudemirus, Belmirus, Bertamirus, Bonimiro, Cartemiro, Caudemirus, Cendamiro, Crescemirus, Crodemirus, Dacamiro, Damiro, Docemiro, Dulcemirus, Eimirus, Eldemirus, Engomirus, Ermemirus, Felmiro, Framiro, Francemirus, Franomiro, Fredemiro, Frumirus, Gademiro, Geldemirus, Gelmiro, Geodemirus, Gesmiro, Godemiro, Gualamirus, Guimirus, Guldremirus, Gulfemirus, Guntemirus, Gutemirus, Karmirus, Leodemiro, Leomirus, Nantemiro, Odamirus, Onemirus, Ostromirus, Astromirus, Estromirus, Quidemirus, Rademirus, Ragimiru, Randemirus, Ranemirus, Recemirus, Rodemirus, Salamirus, Santimirus, Saxomirus, Segomirus, Selmirus, Sendamirus, Sesmiro, Spodemirus, Suimirus, Sulfemirus, Sundemirus, Suniemirus, Teodemirus, Trasmiro, Trastemiro, Tructemiro, Vademirus, Victemirus, Vidramirus, Viliamirus, Visclamirus, Vistremiro, Vittimero
-modus	*mōdaz	"courage, anger, wrath"	Trassemutus, Vermudus
-mundus (later -mondo)	*mundaz	"protection, guardianship"	Ansemondus, Argemondo, Arumundo, Asemondus, Astramondus, Atalamondo, Badamundus, Camundus, Damondus, Dolcemondus, Eldemundus, Fredamundus, Gemundus, Geodemondo, Gismundus, Germundus, Godomundus, Gomundus, Gontemondus, Goymundus, Guimundus, Gutemondo, Hermundus, Itimondo, Keremondus, Leodemundo, Nandamundus, Odemundus, Olemundus, Rademundus, Ranemundus, Recemundus, Reimondus, Remismundus, Rosamundus, Segemundus, Sesmundo, Sindamundus, Teodemundus, Trasmondo, Tructemondo, Unemundus, Vadamundus, Viamundus, Visclamundus, Vistemundo, Vistramundi, Vizamundus, Zamondo
-nandus (later -ando)	*nanþ-az	"bold, courageous"	Bretenandus, Ermenandus, Euvenandus, Fredenandus, Gudenandus, Ketenando, Reinantus, Riquinandus, Sisnandus, Teodenandus, Vittinandus
-redus, -radus, -ridus (later -reu)	*rēdaz	"advice"	Aderedus, Alderedus, Anseredo, Argeredus, Asoredus, Astredo, Balderedo, Dagaredus, Egeredus, Enaredus, Engoredus, Evorido, Falderedo, Fateredus, Fraredus, Fulcaredus, Goldredo, Gomaredus, Guderedus, Gunderedo, Kenderedus, Leoveredus, Malaredus, Moderido, Onaredus, Osoredo, Provaredo, Recaredus, Sabaredus, Sendredus, Seniaredus, Sigeredus, Sueredus, Teoderedus, Uiliaredus, Uimaredus, Visaridus
-ricus (later -rigo)	*rīkz	"ruler, lord"	Accaricus, Aderico, Alaricus, Aldericus, Aliaricus, Alvaricus, Andericus, Ansericus, Ardericus, Argericus, Ascarigus, Asparigus, Asterigo, Atanaricus, Atericus, Balderico, Betericus, Bliviaricus, Brandericus, Censerigus, Iensericus, Coniaricus, Desterigus, Domerigo, Eburicus, Eimericus, Eirigu, Elperico, Engorigus, Ermericus, Fredericus, Fromaricus, Fruaricus, Gauderigus, Geserigus, Getericus, Gildaricus, Golfarico, Gomarigus, Guderigo, Guimarigus, Guiricus, Gulderigus, Gunderigus, Ilderigus, Ionarico, Iusterigo, Iuvericus, Leoderigus, Leoverigus, Magnaricus, Malaricus, Matericus, Modericus, Monderico, Nandaricus, Odericus, Onoricus, Osorico, Ausarigus, Pipericus, Quidericus, Rakericus, Reirigus, Rendericus, Restericus, Retericus, Romarigus, Rudericus, Savaricus, Sendericus, Seririgo, Sesericus, Sigericus, Sigunterigo, Soniaricus, Spanaricu, Spandaricus, Spoderigo, Teodericus, Trasaricus, Tructericus, Turpericus, Venetricus, Vendericus, Genitrigus, Viaricus, Victericus, Viliaricu, Vistraricus
-racus (later -rago)	*rakaz	"straight"	Savaracus, Teoderago
-rote	*rōtaz	"glad"	Ermerote
-sendus, -sindus	*senþaz; or *swenþaz	"companion"; or "strong"	Adelasindo, Adesindus, Andosindus, Ardesendus, Argesindus, Arosindus, Auresindus, Ausendus, Badosindus, Bagesindus, Becosindo, Baldesindo, Baudesindus, Berosindus, Bonesindus, Eisindus, Eldesindus, Ermosindus, Evosindo, Floresindus, Fortesindus, Fredosindus, Froisendus, Fromosindus, Gaudesindo, Geodesindus, Gitesindus, Gomesindo, Gotesendus, Gudesindus, Guisindus, Gundesindus, Leodesindo, Leovesindus, Manosindus, Marcosendus, Onesindus, Quedesendo, Kedesendo, Radesindus, Ragesindus, Ranosindus, Recesindus, Remesindus, Rudesindus, Segesindo, Spanosendo, Storesindo, Teodesindus, Trasendus, Tructesindus, Villisendo, Vistresindus, Zendasindo
-scalcus	*skalkaz	"servant"	Gundiscalcus
-suendo, -suindo	*swenþaz	"strong"	Reccesuindus
-teus, -deus, -dius	*þewaz	"servant"	Ansedeus, Arnadius, Engladius, Filisteus, Gudesteus
-ualdus, -aldus, -gualdus, -allo	*waldaz	"ruler, mighty"	Ansuallo, Anualdus, Ardaldus, Arnaldus, Arualdus, Astualdu, Avaldus, Barvaldus, Bernaldus, Bidualdus, Ensaldus, Ermaldus, Fredoaldus, Fromaldus, Giraldus, Gomaldo, Gontualdo, Grimaldus, Guantaldus, Leovaldo, Manualdus, Mirualdo, Otualdo, Ranualdus, Recualdus, Reginaldus, Servaldus, Sisualdo, Trasoldi, Vidraldus, Visaldus
-uarius, -oarius	*warjaz	"inhabitant, defender"	Alduarius, Ansuario, Astruario, Freduarius, Oduarius, Osoarius, Randuarius, Trasuarius, Vistravarius
-oindus	*wendaz	"wind"	Aloindo, Eindu, Fredoindus
-oynus	*weniz	"friend"	Odoynus
-uerco	related to PGmc *werkan	"work"	Aliverko, Eldivercus
-uigio, -uigus	*wīgaz	"fighter"	Audugus, Baldoigius, Eldoigius, Ermoygius, Eroigius, Erigio, Guntigio, Leodeuigus, Mervigius, Rodougus, Viligus, Vistrevius
-oytus, -vitus	probably related to PGmc *witōn	"wise"	Aldroitus, Aloitus, Argevitus, Senduitu, Sesuito
-ulfus, -gulfus	*wulfaz	"wolf"	Adaulfus, Ataulfus, Agiulfus, Agrivulfum, Aliulfus, Andulfus, Ansiulphus, Anulfo, Ardulfus, Ariulfus, Arnulfo, Asarulfo, Asculfo, Asiulfus, Astrulfus, Astulfus, Aulfus, Berulfus, Betrulfus, Brandiulfus, Ebregulfus, Endulfus, Ermulfo, Eruulfus, Fardulfus, Fradiulfus, Fredulfus, Fregulfus, Frogiulfo, Gandulfo, Gardulfus, Gaulfus, Geodulfus, Gesulfus, Ierulfus, Gigulfo, Gomulfus, Gresulfo, Gudilulfo, Gundulfo, Ildulfus, Kendulfus, Leodulfus, Mandulfo, Maniulfus, Manulfus, Meitulfus, Nandulfo, Osdulfus, Quedulfus, Radulfus, Ragolfus, Randulfus, Ranulfus, Refulfo, Regaulfus, Sagulfus, Sendulfus, Seniulfus, Serulfus, Sisulfus, Teodulfus, Trastulfus, Trasulfus, Trudulfus, Tundulfus, Turisulfus, Uisulfus, Venariufi, Viliulfus
-uldus, -guldus	*wulþuz	"splendor"	Arebuldo, Atauldus, Ebreguldus, Framuldo, Frineguldus, Fronuldo, Gebuldus, Itaultus, Senuldo, Sisuldus, Toduldo, Tumtuldo

Suffixes used to derive hypocoristic masculine names are:

- -eca, -ica (later -ega): Abrecan, Adica, Audeca, Begica, Egica, Elleca, Gagica, Segika
- -ila (later -ia): Adila, Andila, Anila, Ansila, Attila, Audila, Azilane, Badila, Baldila, Becilla, Bergila, Berila, Blandila, Brandila, Butila, Cixila, Crizila, Cutella, Dadila, Danila, Ducila, Egila, Agila, Emila, Ermila, Fafila, Fafia, Fagila, Fandila, Favila, Fradila, Framila, Frankila, Froila, Gandila, Gaudilani, Gavila, Gladila, Gramila, Guadla, Guandila, Gudila, Gulfila, Gumila, Gundila, Ikila, Itila, Iudila, Iustila, Iuvila, Keila, Kinquila, Ledla, Lubila, Magila, Manilla, Mantila, Martila, Massila, Mellilla, Merila, Mudila, Mugila, Mumila, Mundila, Naustila, Nuilla, Neufila, Nunnila, Ofila, Oila, Opila, Ossila, Quintila, Ramila, Riquila, Romila, Rudila, Sabila, Scarcila, Sigila, Sindila, Sunila, Tancila, Tegila, Teodila, Titila, Tuntila, Unilla, Vertila, Vidila, Vigila, Vincila, Visterla, Vitila, Vizila, Zisila
- -inus (later -ino): Addalinus, Aldinus, Bagino, Baltino, Baquino, Batinus, Berinus, Bertinus, Blandinus, Boninus, Brandinus, Cartinus, Crescino, Dadinus, Dalinus, Eldinus, Evorinus, Fandinus, Farino, Favino, Fofino, Fonsinus, Fruginus, Frauino, Gandinus, Gaudinas, Gavinus, Gentino, Gendinus, Golinus, Guginus, Gulfinus, Gultinus, Guntinus, Gutinus, Haginus, Hamdino, Iubinus, Karinus, Lallinus, Lelino, Lubinus, Mandinus, Maninus, Matlinus, Muginus, Mundinus, Nandinus, Naninus, Nunninus, Odinus, Audinus, Pantinus, Pappinus, Pennino, Pipinus, Quizino, Randinus, Recinus, Sandinus, Scerinus, Sedino, Sendinus, Sisinus, Spintino, Suffini, Tancinus, Tanino, Tatina, Tetina, Tegino, Teodinus, Tracinus, Tradinus, Tructinus, Trudinus, Uittina, Uittinus, Vandino, Goandinus, Vitinus, Zanino
- -linus, -llinus: Abbelino, Adolinus, Francolino, Gundelinus, Iovellinus
- -itus (later -ido): Cagitus, Carito, Crescitu, Donnitus, Froritum, Ganiti, Gegitus, Gogitus, Gumito, Guncitus, Iuvitus, Magitus, Magnitus, Manitus, Marcitus, Maxitus, Nannitus, Nonnitu, Papitus, Pegito, Pinnitus, Ragito, Sabitus, Sunitus, Sonnito, Tanitus, Atanitus, Tegitus, Trasido, Uegitus, Zanitus, Zazitus, Zenzitus
- -ellus (later -elo): Betellus, Felellus, Francellus, Froiellus, Frumellus, Gigelus, Gumellus, Guntellus, Gutellus, Hermellus, Lubellus, Mannello, Mantellus, Mirellus, Mundellus, Nonellus, Papellus, Recelli, Sendello, Sisellus, Trastelus, Truitellus, Uistrello, Visellu, Zanellus

Superlative and comparative suffixes were also used in forming personal names: -iza: Boniza, Wittiza -istaz: Ariastre, Belestrio, Fromesta, Remestro, Segestro

Other suffixes imply origin or relationship:

- -ingaz: Amingus, Bellengus, Gardingus
- -iskaz: Vandaliscus "Vandal" (male), Huniscus "Hun" (male)
- -iskō: Hunisco "Hun" (female)

== Toponyms ==
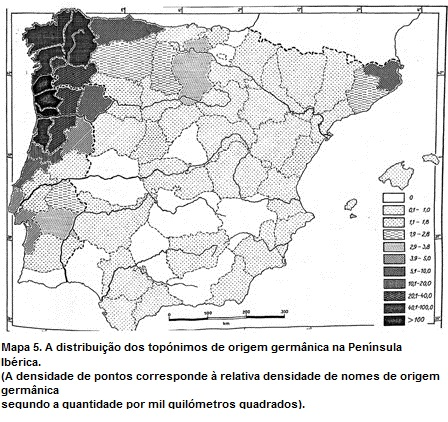
Distribution of Germanic place names across the Iberian peninsula. Darker shades indicate higher concentration.

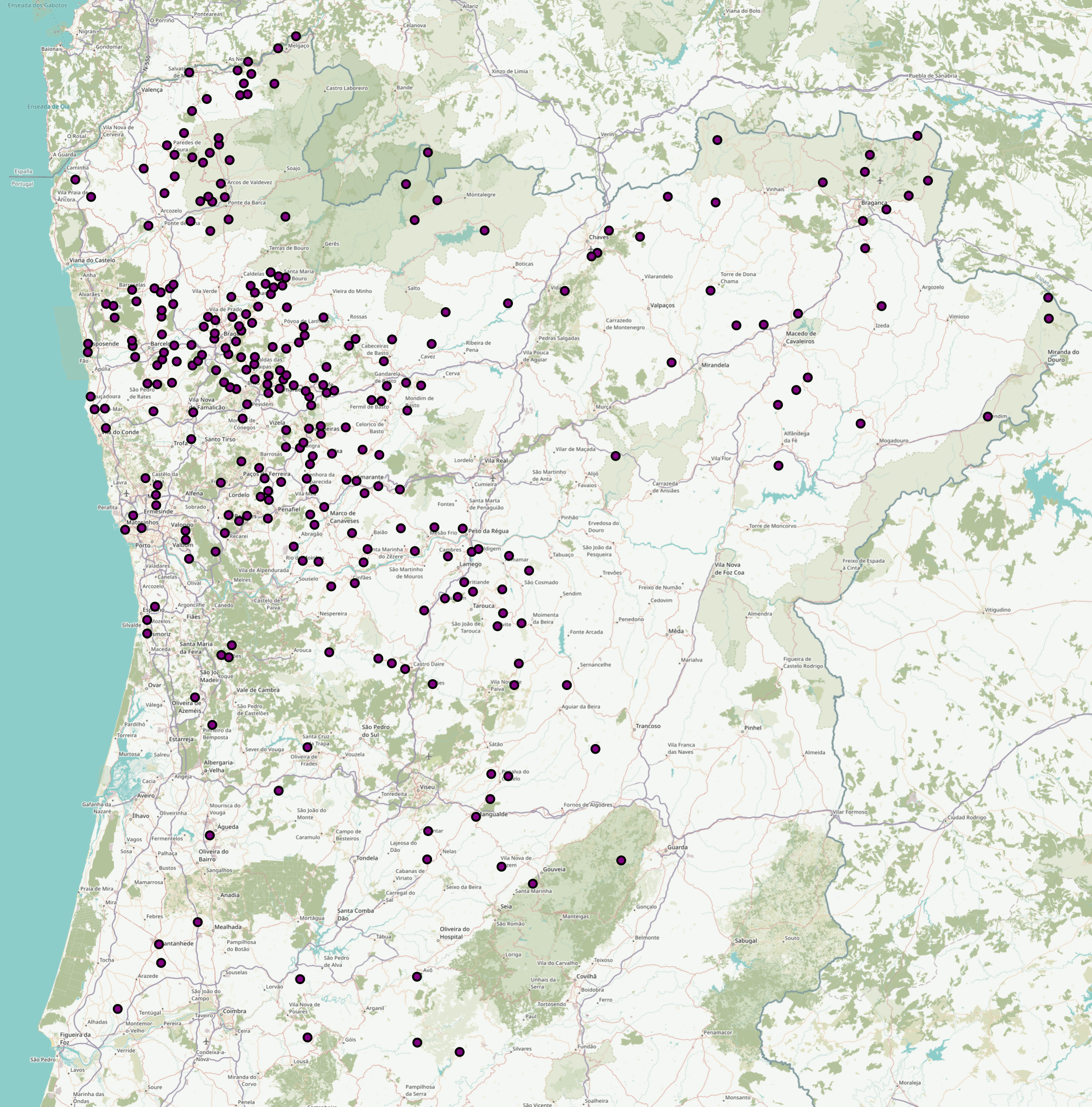
Distribution of germanic toponyms in Portugal

Many of these names are also toponyms (towns, parishes, villages, hamlets and fields), usually in the form of a Latin or Germanic genitive of the owner's name and sometimes preceded by the type of property (a Galician word of Latin, Germanic or pre-Latin origin) such as vila (villa, palace, estate), vilar (hamlet), castro (castle), casa (house), porta (pass, ford), agro (field), sa (Germanic sala; hall, house), busto (dairy), cabana (cabin), lama (pastures), fonte (well, spring), pena (fort), pumar (orchard) and val (valley). About five percent of Galicia's 315 municipalities have this kind of name:

- Allariz to Aliarici, genitive of Aliaricus
- Baltar to Baltarii, genitive of Baltharius
- Beariz to Viarici, genitive of Viaricus
- Calvos de Randín to Randini, genitive of Randinus
- Forcarei to Fulcaredi, genitive of Fulkaredus
- Friol to Fredoaldi, genitive of Fredoaldus
- Gomesende to Gumesindi, genitive of Gumesindus
- Gondomar to Gundemari, genitive of Gundemarus
- Guntín to Guntini, genitive of Guntinus
- Guitiriz to Uitterici, genitive of Uittericus
- Lalín to Lallini, genitive of Lallinus
- Mondariz to Munderici, genitive of Mundericus
- Rairiz de Veiga to Ragerici, genitive of Ragericus
- Ramirás to Ranamiranis, Germanized genitive of Ranemirus
- Sandiás to Sindilanis, Germanized genitive of Sindila
- Vilasantar to Villa Sentarii, genitive of Sentarius

Several thousand such toponyms are known in Galicia, northern Portugal, western Asturias and other territories which were part of the Suebi kingdom.

== See also ==
- Germanic names in Italy, similar developments

== Literature ==
=== Proto-Germanic reconstruction ===
- Orel, Vladimir (2003). Handbook of Germanic Etymology. Leiden: Brill, 2003. ISBN 978-90-04-12875-0.
- Köbler, Gerhard. (2007). Germanisches Wörterbuch. On-line .
- Kroonen, Guus. (2013). Etymological Dictionary of Proto-Germanic. Leiden: Brill, 2013. ISBN 978-9004183407.

=== Germanic personal names ===
- Förstemanm, Ernst (1900). Altdeutsches Namenbuch. P. Hanstein: Bonn, 1900.
- Forssner, Thorvald (1916). Continental-Germanic personal names in England in Old and Middle English times. Uppsala, 1916.
- Redin, Mats (1919). Studies on uncompounded personal names in old English. Uppsala, 1919.
- Schönfeld, M. (1911). Wörterbuch der Altgermanischen Personen und Völkernamen. Heidelberg, 1911.
- Searle, W. G. (1897). Onomasticon Anglo-Saxonicum. Cambridge: 1897.

=== Galician Medieval onomastics ===
- Rivas Quintas, Elixio (1991) Onomástica persoal do noroeste hispano. Alvarellos: Lugo, 1991. ISBN 84-85311-93-0.
- Boullón Agrelo, Ana I. (1999). Antroponimia medieval galega (ss. VIII-XII). Tübingen: Niemeyer, 1999. ISBN 978-3-484-55512-9.
- "Extramundi". In: Moralejo, Juan J. Callaica Nomina: Estudios de Onomástica Gallega. Fundación Pedro Barrié de la Maza, D.L. 2007. pp. 19–23.

=== Germanic toponymy in Galicia and Portugal ===
- Sachs, Georg (1932) Die germanischen Ortsnamen in Spanien und Portugal. Jena: Leipzig, 1932.
- Piel, J. (1933-1940) Os nomes germânicos na toponímia portuguesa. In Boletim Português de Filologia vol. II-VII: Lisboa.
- Joseph Piel
