= List of Galician monarchs =

Coat of arms of the Kingdom of Galicia

Galicia is an autonomous community and historical nationality in modern-day northwestern Spain on the Iberian Peninsula, which was a major part of the Roman province known as Gallaecia prior to 409. It consists of the provinces of A Coruña, Lugo, Ourense and Pontevedra. It is bounded on the north by the Cantabrian Sea, to the south by Portugal, to the west by the Atlantic Ocean and to the east by principality of Asturias and the community of Castile and León. The archipelago of the Cíes Islands, the Ons archipelago, the Sálvora archipelago and other island such as Cortegada, Arousa, the Sisargas Islands and the Malveiras Islands are also part of Galicia.

Galicia has about 2,795,422 inhabitants which mainly combines the coastal strip between Ferrol and A Coruña in the northwest and between Vilagarcía de Arousa and Vigo in the southwest.

The medieval and modern Kingdom of Galicia derived of the kingdom of the Suebi, founded by king Hermeric in 409. By the 6th century the kingdom of the Suebi was already known as the Kingdom of Galicia, Gregory of Tours being the first chronicler to use this denomination.

== Kings of the Suebi (409–585) ==
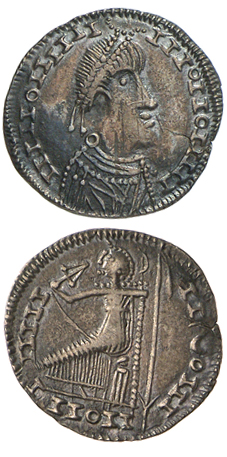
A silver half-siliqua coin of a Suevic king of Galicia from c. 410–500.

First royal dynasty (409–456)

- Rechila (438–448)
- Rechiar (448–456)
- Aioulf (456–457), foreigner, possibly an appointee of the Visigoths

Competing kings (457–469)

Note: the war of succession split the kingdom, and multiple kings ruled smaller regions of Galicia.

- Maldras (457–460), in opposition to Framta after 457
- Framta (457), in opposition to Maldras
- Richimund (457–464), successor of Framta
- Frumar (460–464), successor of Maldras
- Remismund (464–469), succeeded Frumar, reunited the Suebi

Period of obscurity (469–550)

- Hermeneric (fl. c. 485)
- Veremund (fl. 535)
- Theodemund (fl. 6th century)

Final period of the Suebi (550–585)

- Chararic (after c. 550–558/559), existence sometimes doubted
- Ariamir (558/559–561/566)
- Theodemar (561/566–570)
- Miro or Mirón (570–583)
- Eboric, or Euric (583–584), deposed and put in a monastery by Audeca
- Andeca (584–585), deposed and put in a monastery by Liuvigild
- Malaric (585), opposed Liuvigild and was defeated

== Visigothic kings (585–712) ==
The Visigothic kings took control of Galicia in 585, which became the sixth province of the Kingdom of Toledo. Galicia maintained a distinguishable administrative and legal identity up to the collapse of the Visigothic monarchy.

- Liuvigild (585–586)
- Reccared I (586–601)
- Liuva II (601–603)
- Witteric (603–610)
- Gundemar (610–612)
- Sisebut (612–621)
- Reccared II (621)
- Suintila (621–631)
- Sisenand (631–636)
- Chintila (636–640)
- Tulga (640–641)
- Chindasuinth (641–653)
- Reccesuinth (649–672)
- Wamba (672–680)
- Erwig (680–687)
- Egica, (687–702) – secured his son Wittiza as his heir.
- Wittiza (694–710) – associated to the throne as king in Galicia until 702; only king after his father's death.
- Roderic (710–712)

== Asturian kings (740–910) ==
In 740, Alfonso I of Asturias captured Galicia from the Muslims.

- Alfonso I of Asturias (740–757)
- Fruela I of Asturias (757–768)
- Aurelius of Asturias (768–774)
- Silo of Asturias (774–783)
- Mauregatus of Asturias (783–789)
- Bermudo I of Asturias (788–791)
- Alfonso II of Asturias (791–842)
- Ramiro I of Asturias (842-850)
- Ordoño I of Asturias (850–866)
- Alfonso III of Asturias (866–910)

== Kings of Galicia (910–present) ==
In 910, Alfonso III the Great was forced to abdicate in favor of his sons, Ordoño, Fruela and Garcia, who partitioned the kingdom amongst them. Ordoño was the first to adopt the title "King of Galicia".

=== Ordoñez dynasty (910–1037) ===
- Ordoño I (910–924). In 914, Ordoño succeeded Garcia on the thrones of León.
- Fruela I (924–925). Brother of the former. Upon succeeding Ordoño on the thrones of León and Galicia he reunited his father's realm.
- Alfonso I (925). Son of the former. Briefly ruled as king before being ousted by his three cousins.
- Sancho I (925–929). First-born of Ordoño, cousin of the former.
- Alfonso II (929-931). Brother of the former.
- Bermudo I (982–999). Crowned as anti-king by the Galician nobility in Santiago de Compostela. Routed Ramiro III of León in the battle of Portela de Areas, after which he acceded to the throne of Leon.
- Alfonso III (999–1028). Son of the former.
- Bermudo II (1028–1037). Son of the former.

=== Jiménez dynasty (1037–1111) ===
- Ferdinand I (1037–1065). Upon his death, Castile, León and Galicia were divided amongst his sons.
- García II (1065–1071) – reigned in Galicia and in the County of Portugal until he was deposed by his brothers Alfonso and Sancho in 1071, after which he was made prisoner until his death in 1090.
- Sancho II (1071–1072) – briefly co-reigned as king of Galicia with his brother Alfonso until he was assassinated in 1072.
- Alfonso IV (1071–1109) – co-ruled Galicia until his brother Sancho was assassinated in 1072, whereupon he acceded the throne of Castille as well.
- Urraca (1109–1111). Daughter of the former.

=== Burgundian dynasty (1111–1369) ===
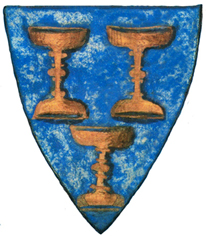
13th century depiction of the coat-of-arms of Galicia

- Alfonso V (1111–1157). Son of the former. In 1111, he was crowned king of Galicia in Santiago de Compostela as his mother's heir apparent. In 1126, he succeeded Urraca as king of León, Castile and Toledo. During his reign, Afonso I of Portugal rebelled against León, of which he was a vassal. From 1152 on, Alfonso VII associated his sons to the throne, Ferdinand receiving the title of King of Galicia.
- Ferdinand II (1157–1188). Son of the former. Acceded to the throne of León upon his father's death in 1157.
- Alfonso VI (1188–1230). Son of the former. On his death, his kingdom was divided between his daughters, who reigned a few months de jure.
- Dulce and Sancha, queens of Galicia (1230) de jure
- Ferdinand III (1230–1252). King of Castile who became King of Galicia after Dulce and Sancha's renunciation of their titles.
- Alfonso VII (1252–1284). Son of the former.
- Sancho III (1284–1295). Son of the former.
- Ferdinand IV (1295–1312). During his early reign, his uncle John of Castile, Lord of Valencia de Campos disputed the title with him and claimed to be king of León, Galicia and Seville.
- Alfonso VIII (1312–1350). Son of the former.
- Peter of Castile (1350–1369). Son of the former.

=== Portuguese House of Burgundy (1369–1371) ===
- Ferdinand IV (1369–1371). Following Peter I of Castile's death, a succession crisis occurred. During this time, the throne of Galiza was offered to Ferdinand I of Portugal, a member of the Portuguese House of Burgundy, and he was acclaimed in Galicia as King. His reign would see the opening of trade between the two nations and economic benefits for both. This reign, however, would be short, as Ferdinand relinquished the throne of Galicia in favour of Henry II of Castile after the first of the Fernandine Wars.

=== House of Trastámara (1371–1555) ===
- Henry I (1371–1379). Son of Alfonso VII.
- John I (1379–1390). Son of the former. In 1386, John of Gaunt pressed the claim for his wife (and himself), to the throne of Castile. He successfully invaded Galicia and held most of the country until he was defeated in 1387.
- Henry II (1390–1406). Son of the former.
- John II (1406–1454). Son of the former.
- Henry III (1454–1474). Son of the former.
- Isabella I (1474–1504). Daughter of John II. Afonso V of Portugal and Juana la Beltraneja, acclaimed de jure kings of Galicia in 1475, saw their pretensions to the Castilian throne defeated at the Battle of Toro in 1479.
- Joanna I (1504–1516/1555). Daughter of the former. Confined and powerless.

=== House of Habsburg (1555–1700) ===
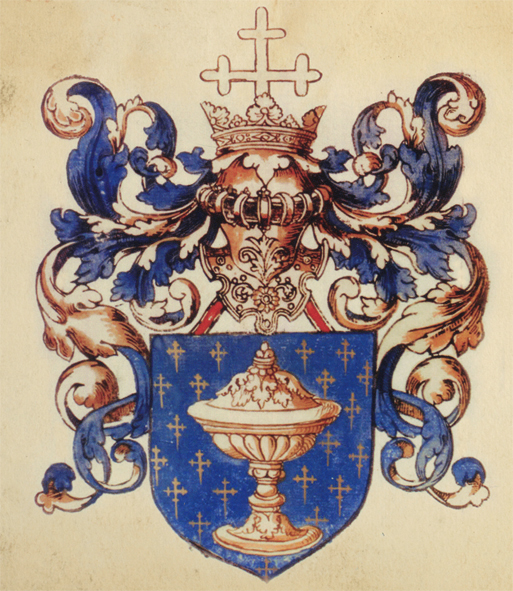
16th century depiction of the coat-of-arms of Galicia

- Charles I (1516/1555–1556). Son of Joanna.
- Philip II (1556–1598). Son of the former.
- Philip III (1598–1621). Son of the former.
- Philip IV (1621–1665). Son of the former.
- Charles II (1665–1700). Son of the former.

=== House of Bourbon (1700–1808) ===
- Philip V (1700–1724). Great-grandson of Philip IV.
- Louis I (1724). Son of the former.
- Philip V (1724–1746). Great-grandson of Philip IV.
- Ferdinand VI (1746–1749). Son of Philip V.
- Charles III (1759–1788). Son of Philip V.
- Charles IV (1788–1808). Son of the former.
- Ferdinand VII (1808). Son of the former.

=== House of Bonaparte (1808–1813) ===
- Joseph (1808–1813).

=== House of Bourbon (1813–1868) ===
- Ferdinand VII (1813–1833)
- Isabella II (1833–1868). Daughter of the former.

=== House of Savoy (1870–1873) ===
- Amadeo I (1870–1873)

=== House of Bourbon (1874–1931, 1975–present) ===
- Alfonso XII (1874–1885). Son of Isabella II.
- Alfonso XIII (1886–1931). Son of the former.
- Juan Carlos I (1975–2014). Grandson of Alfonso XIII.
- Felipe VI (2014–present). Son of the former.

== Gallery ==
Royal pantheon of the Cathedral of Santiago de Compostela
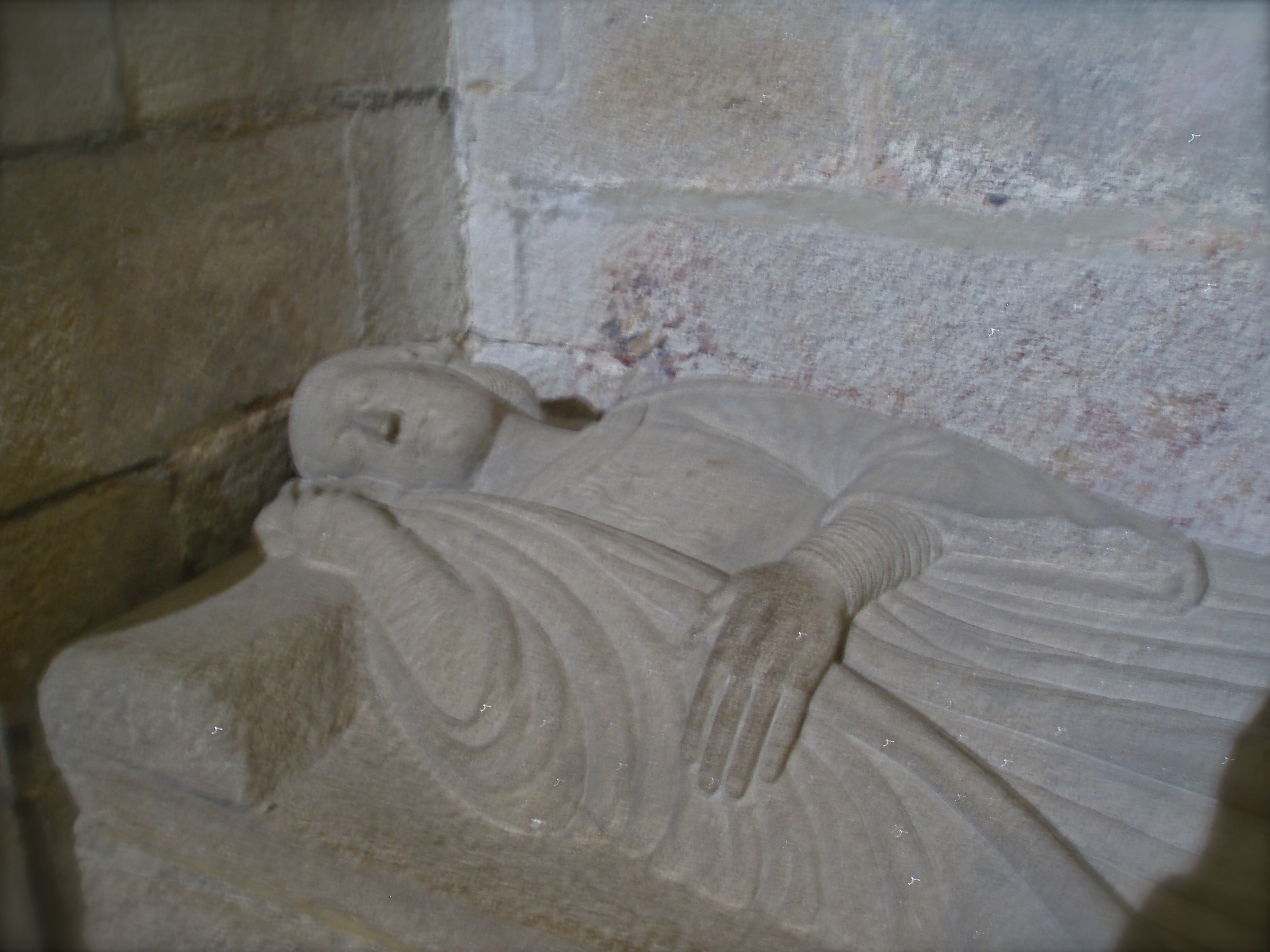
Sepulcher of count Raymond of Burgundy, lord of Galicia, and father of Alfonso VII (d. 1107)

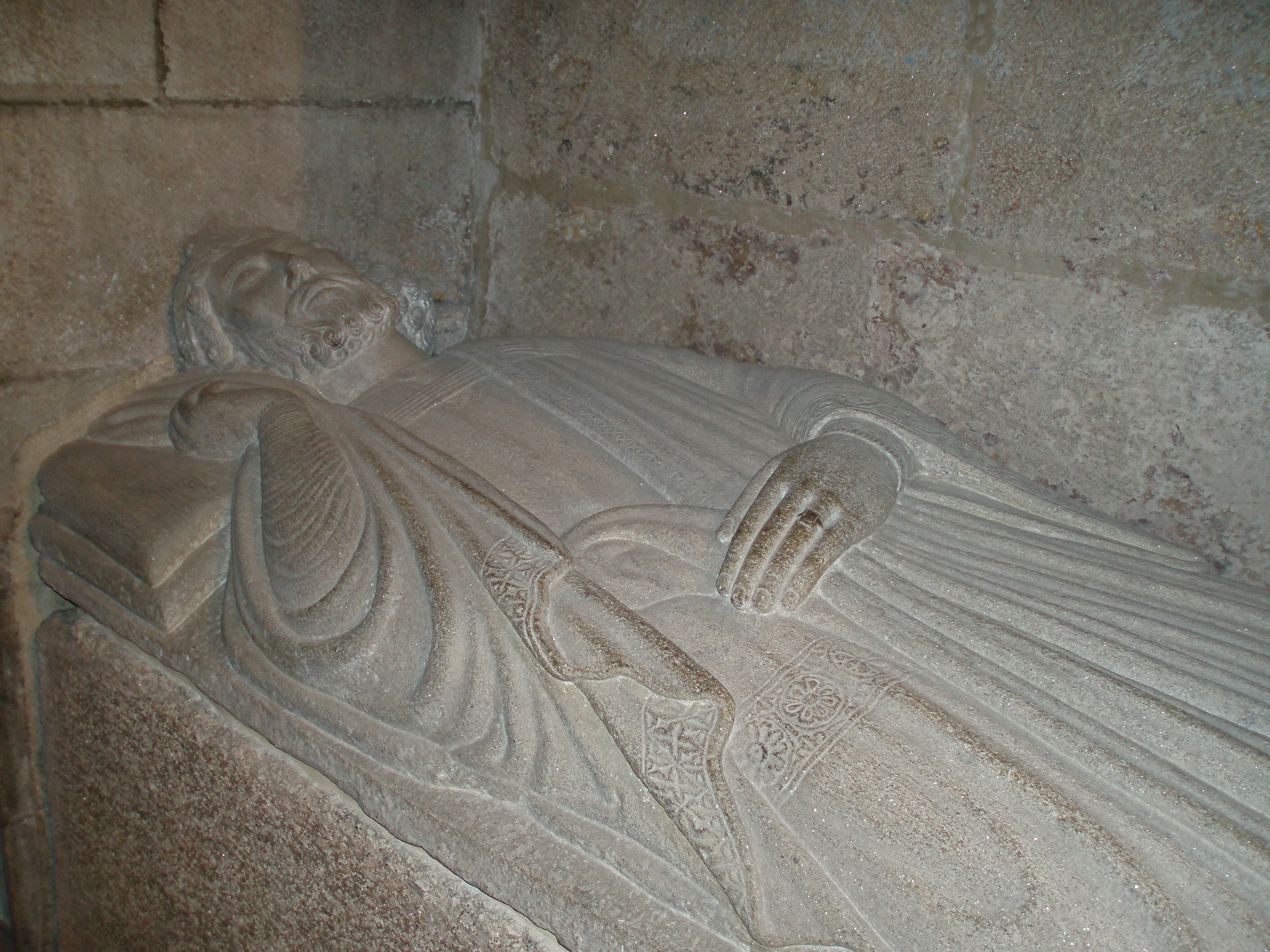
Sepulcher of king Ferdinand II (d. 1187)

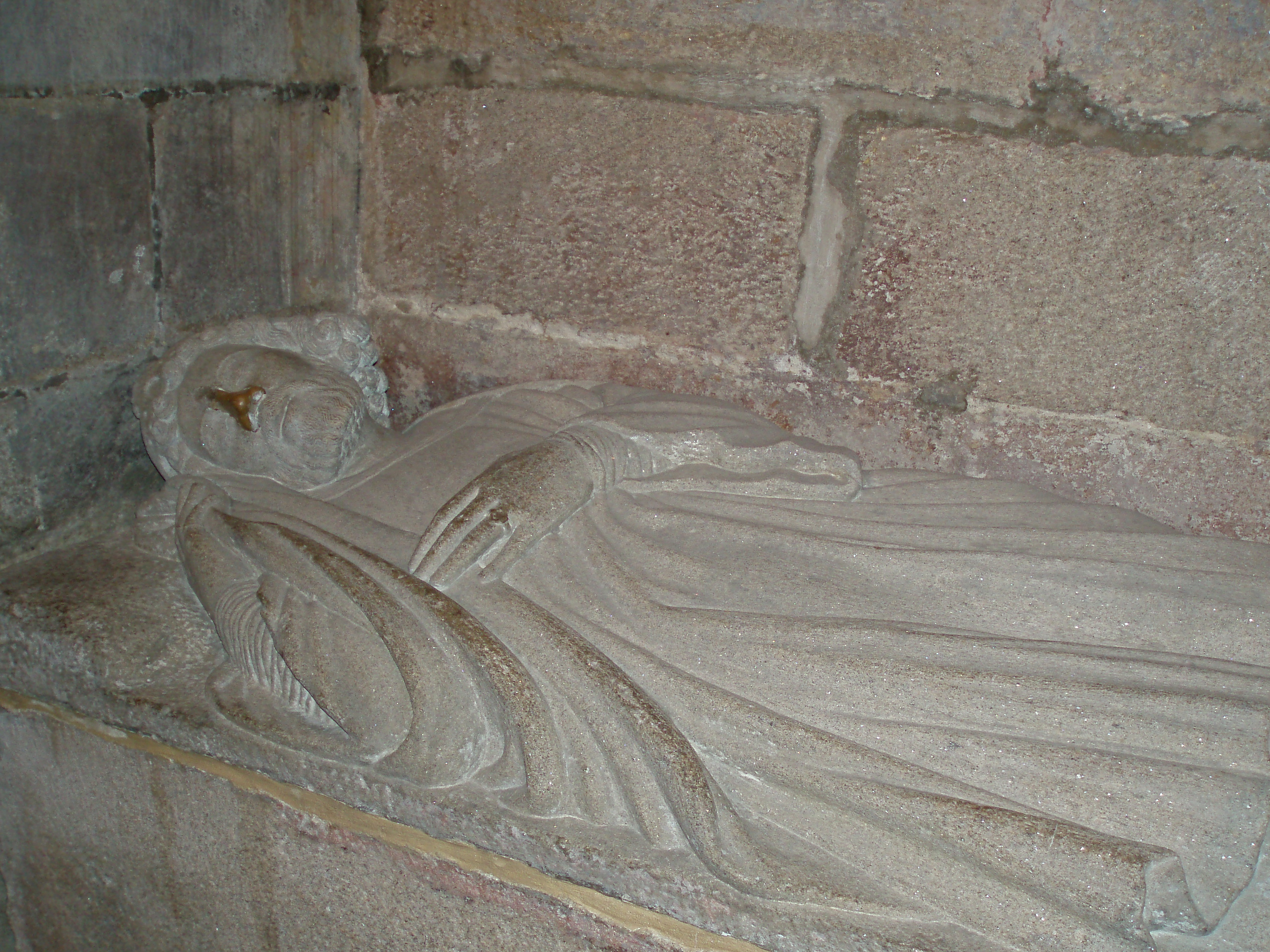
Sepulcher of king Alfonso IX (d. 1230)

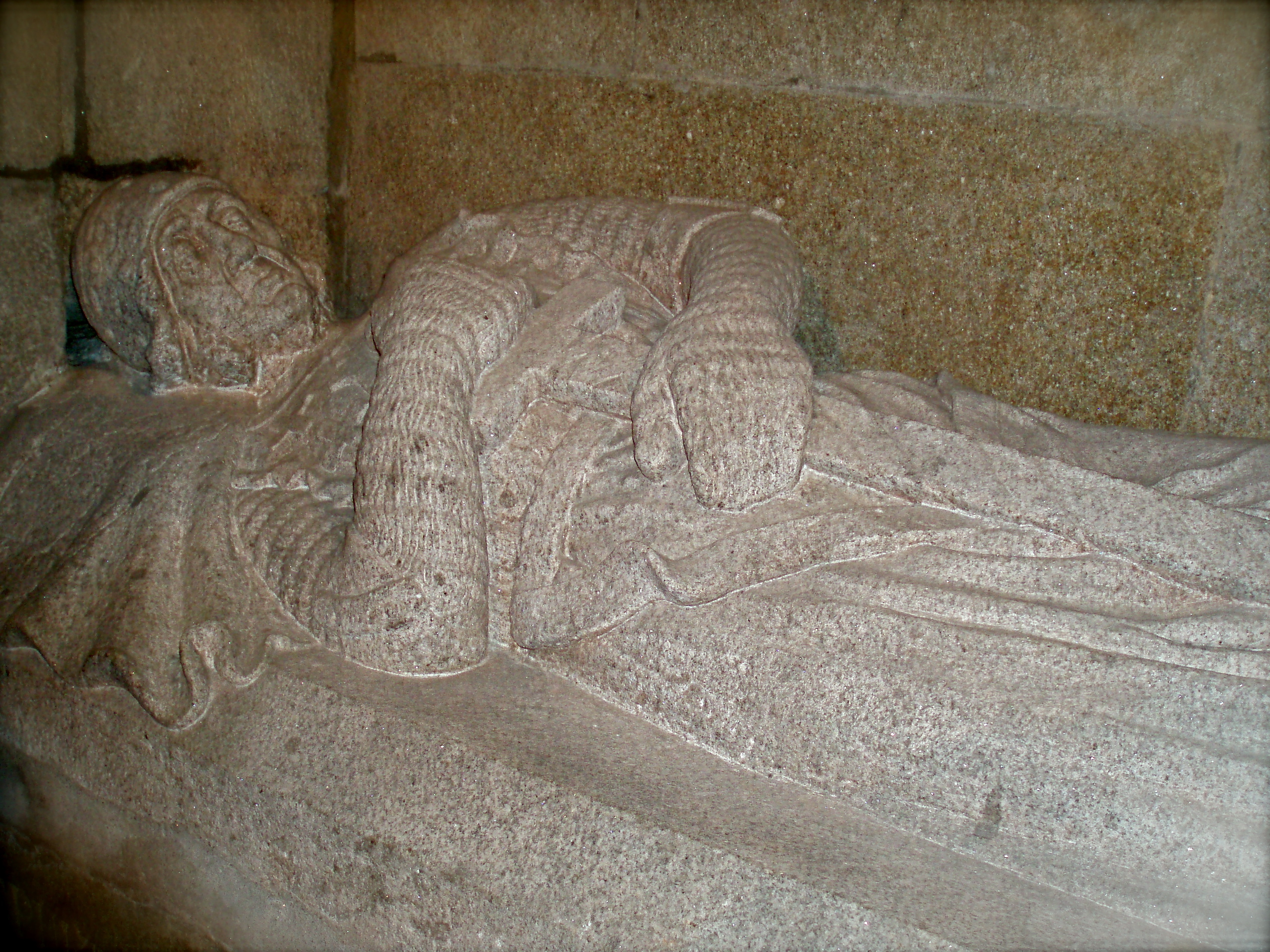
Sepulcher of count Pedro Fróilaz de Traba, protector of king Alfonso VII (d. 1128)

== See also ==
- List of Portuguese monarchs
  - Monarchs' family tree
- Monarchs of Spain
  - Monarchs' family tree
- Kings of the Visigoths
  - Kings' family tree
- Kings of Asturis
  - Monarchs' family tree
- Monarchs of Navarre
  - Monarchs' family tree
- Monarchs of Leon
  - Monarchs' family tree
- Kings of Aragon
  - Monarchs' family tree
- Kings of Castilla
  - Monarchs' family tree
