= 463 =

463 in various calendars
- Gregorian calendar: 463; CDLXIII
- Ab urbe condita: 1216
- Assyrian calendar: 5213
- Balinese saka calendar: 384–385
- Bengali calendar: −131 – −130
- Berber calendar: 1413
- Buddhist calendar: 1007
- Burmese calendar: −175
- Byzantine calendar: 5971–5972
- Chinese calendar: 壬寅年 (Water Tiger); 3160 or 2953 — to — 癸卯年 (Water Rabbit); 3161 or 2954
- Coptic calendar: 179–180
- Discordian calendar: 1629
- Ethiopian calendar: 455–456
- Hebrew calendar: 4223–4224
- Hindu calendars
- Vikram Samvat: 519–520
- Shaka Samvat: 384–385
- Kali Yuga: 3563–3564
- Holocene calendar: 10463
- Iranian calendar: 159 BP – 158 BP
- Islamic calendar: 164 BH – 163 BH
- Javanese calendar: 348–349
- Julian calendar: 463; CDLXIII
- Korean calendar: 2796
- Minguo calendar: 1449 before ROC 民前1449年
- Nanakshahi calendar: −1005
- Seleucid era: 774/775 AG
- Thai solar calendar: 1005–1006
- Tibetan calendar: ཆུ་ཕོ་སྟག་ལོ་ (male Water-Tiger); 589 or 208 or −564 — to — ཆུ་མོ་ཡོས་ལོ་ (female Water-Hare); 590 or 209 or −563

Year 463 (CDLXIII) was a common year starting on Tuesday of the Julian calendar. At the time, it was known as the Year of the Consulship of Basilius and Vivianus (or, less frequently, year 1216 Ab urbe condita). The denomination 463 for this year has been used since the early medieval period, when the Anno Domini calendar era became the prevalent method in Europe for naming years.

== Events ==
=== By place ===
==== Europe ====
- In the Gothic war against Aegidius, Childeric I, king of the Salian Franks, allies with the Roman general Aegidius. This war is ended by the battle near Orléans, where the Visigoths under King Theodoric II are defeated by the Franks, while crossing the Loire River.
- The Suebi live under a diarchy, and fight a civil war over the kingship in Galicia (Northern Spain).

==== Asia ====
- The Kibi Clan Rebellion against the Yamato state (Japan) in the Korean Peninsula begins.

== Births ==
- Houfei Di, emperor of the Liu Song dynasty (d. 477)

== Deaths ==
- Frumar, Suevic king of Galicia (approximate date)
- Richimund, Suevic king of Galicia (approximate date)
- Romanus of Condat, hermit and saint (approximate date)
