= Ajax (missionary) =

Arian missionary

Ajax was an Arian missionary to the pagan Suevi of Galicia who converted them to Christianity in 464 or 466.

Due in part to his unusual Homeric name his origins have been debated. The contemporary chronicler Hydatius, the Catholic bishop of Aquae Flaviae, refers to him as Aiax natione Galata. "Galata" may refer to either a Galician, Gaul, or Galatian. It is doubtful that he was the first, since Hydatius would have called him Gallaeci. It is sometimes assumed that "Galata" is a way to refer to a Greek from the East (i.e. Galatia). On the other hand, the term may mean that he was Celtic, either Gaulish or Galatian. This usage of "Galata" for a Celt may be expected in Hydatius, who had travelled to the East as a child, for it was a Greek norm.

Ajax was sent by Theodoric II, king of the Visigoths at Toulouse, to convert the Suevi to Arianism. The barbarian Arians showed a markedly greater missionary fervour than the Catholics in the fifth century. Theodoric's action may have been a result of the reopening of Suevo-Gothic diplomacy under the Suevic king Remismund, who married a Gothic princess and became a "son in arms" of Theodoric. He may have been sent at Remismund's request.

According to Hydatius, Ajax was "the enemy of the Catholic faith and of the Divine Trinity" (hostis catholicae fidei et divinae trinitatis), a statement which later Isidore of Seville interpreted to mean that the Suevi were Catholics when Ajax converted them to heresy. Hydatius also calls Ajax effectus apostata, meaning an apostate from Catholicism. Ajax was also a senior Arrianus inter Suevos, which may refer either to a bishop or a priest, or may not. It may mean either "senior Arian" or "Arian senior", and may refer to a layman or a member of the Gothic sacerdotal college; in Catholic usage it could mean presbyter.

Ajax's missionary venture was largely successful, especially amongst the nobility. He may well not have been the only Arian missionary sent to Galicia by the Visigoths; though he seems to have organised an influential church there.
