= Censorius =

Roman noble

Censorius (died 448) was a count (comes) of the Western Roman Empire from 432 until his death. He is mentioned in the Chronicle of Hydatius under the years 432 and 440.

In 432, 437, and 440 he was sent into Hispania as an ambassador to the Suevi. On his second expedition he was accompanied by the legate Fretimund. While returning from his third expedition he was captured by Rechila, the Suevic king, near Mértola (Myrtilis). He spent the next eight years in captivity before being executed by Agiulf at Seville (Hispalis). His execution may have some connection with the subsequent belligerent attitude of Rechila's successor, Rechiar, towards the Romans.

== Sources ==
- Thompson, E. A. "The Conversion of the Spanish Suevi to Catholicism." Visigothic Spain: New Approaches. ed. Edward James. Oxford: Oxford University Press, 1980. ISBN 0-19-822543-1.
