= Maldras =

- King of the Suevi
- Reign: 456–460
- Predecessor: Aioulf
- Successor: Frumar
- Died: February 460
- Father: Massilia

Timeline of the Suebic Kings

Maldras (or Masdras) (died February 460) was the Suevic king of Galicia from 456 until his death. After the execution of Rechiar by the victorious Visigoths, the Suevi are said to have established Maldras on the throne. During his reign the Suevic nation became fragmented.

Maldras was the son of Massilia (or Massila) and was not said to be related to the dynasty of Hermeric, which had ruled the Suevi since 406. The wording of the contemporary chronicler Hydatius may be taken to signify that the Suevi population had some part in electing Maldras. They certainly had a part in dividing the kingdom in 457, when part of them refused to accept him as their leader and chose instead Framta. The two Suevic kings acted independently and on Framta's death within a few months his followers are found led by Rechimund, though scholars dispute whether or not the two parties rejoined.

In 457, while Framta was still ruling, Maldras led his people in a large raid on Lusitania. They sacked Lisbon by pretending to come in peace and, once admitted by the citizens, plundering the city. Maldras is also accused of having murdered his brother. In 458 he received envoys from the Visigoths and the Vandals.

His people continued to plunder western Lusitania until Maldras was strangled, perhaps by his own men, in February 460. Maldras' people turned to Frumar as their war-leader then. Afterwards Remismund became king and reunited the Suevic people. He is claimed by Isidore of Seville to be a son of Maldras, but there is some doubt on this.

== Sources ==
- Thompson, E. A. Romans and Barbarians: The Decline of the Western Empire. Madison: University of Wisconsin Press, 1982. ISBN 0-299-08700-X.

== Notes ==
Preceded by Aioulf	King of Galicia; 457–460	Succeeded by Framta in the north in 457
Preceded by Aioulf	King of Galicia; 457–460	Succeeded by Frumar in Lusitania in 460
