= Germanic names in Italy =

Germanic names started to proliferate in Italy after the fall of the Roman Empire due to the Barbarian Invasions of the fourth through sixth centuries.

Early studies of the Germanic names in Italy were carried out by German scholars (e.g., Bruckner (1895), and Gamillscheg 1934–1936).

== History ==
The adoption of Germanic names in Italy was less prominent than in Gaul, another part of the Roman Empire conquered by the Barbarian kingdoms, and was associated with the Ostrogothic and Lombards settlement in Italy. Over time, there was a growing mismatch between the ethnicity and the naming, similar to the Gaul. While initially Gothic names belonged to the Goths, by the 10th century the choice was influenced by the fashion independently of the ethnicity. Often the names were hybrids: German suffixes were added to Roman roots (e.g., Forteramnus =Forte + -ramn + -us) and vice versa (Hrodemia, from Hroðr). Eventually Germanic names have become predominant, but did not displace the Latin-language ones completely. Christianity has played a considerable role in preservation of the classical Greco-Latin names, related to religious ideas and saints. Even the names of pagan gods were preserved via the name of saints (e.g., Mercurius, Victoria) Eventually, in the process of the adoption by non-Germans, Germanic names mutated and became the new names of their own.

== See also ==
- Germanic personal names in Galicia, about the developments in Gallaecia
