= Aquae Flaviae (titular see) =

Coordinates: 41.739°N 7.469°W

The Titular See of Aqua Flaviae (Portuguese: Sé titular de Aqua Flaviae/Diocese de Aquæ Flaviæ) is a former diocese in the Portuguese district of Vial Real and current titular seat of Chaves.

== History ==
Around 350 A.D., Aquae Flaviae was suffragan diocese of the Archdiocese of Braga. The only recorded reference to a bishop was Idácio de Chaves, and the bishopric was suppressed in 711.

The diocese was nominally restored in 1969 as a Latin titular bishopric, and had the following incumbents, of the lowest (episcopal) rank:

- Lino Aguirre Garcia (20 August 1969 – 31 December 1970)
- Rubén Buitrago Trujillo, Augustinian Recollects (O.A.R.) (25 February 1971 – 8 July 1974)
- Stephen Naidoo, Holy Ghost Fathers (C.SS.R.) (2 August 1974 – 20 October 1984), as Auxiliary Bishop of Cape Town (South Africa) (1 July 1974 – 20 October 1984), later succeeding as Archbishop of Cape Town (20 October 1984 – 1 July 1989)
- Édouard Mununu Kasiala, Trappists (O.C.S.O) (8 November 1984 – 10 March 1986)
- Luis Augusto Castro Quiroga, Consolata Missionaries (I.M.C.) (17 October 1986 – 2 February 1998), as Apostolic Vicar of San Vicente–Puerto Leguízamo (Colombia) (17 October 1986 – 2 February 1998), later Metropolitan Archbishop of Tunja (Colombia) (2 February 1998 to the present), President of Episcopal Conference of Colombia (5 July 2005 – 3 July 2008), also Apostolic Administrator of Duitama–Sogamoso (Colombia) (15 October 2012 – 18 April 2015), President of Episcopal Conference of Colombia (9 July 2014 to the present)
- Vicente Costa (1 July 1998 – 9 October 2002)
- Manuel da Rocha Felício (21 October 2002 – 21 December 2004)
- Anacleto Cordeiro Gonçalves de Oliveira (4 February 2005 – 11 June 2010)
- Pio Gonçalo Alves de Sousa (18 February 2011 to the present), Auxiliary Bishop of Porto
