= Remismund =

5th-century King of Galicia

- King of the Suevi
- Reign: 464–469
- Predecessor: Maldras
- Successor: Hermeneric
- Died: 469
- Father: Maldras
- Religion: Arianism

Remismund (or Rimismund) (died 469) was the Suevic king of Galicia from c. 464 until his death.

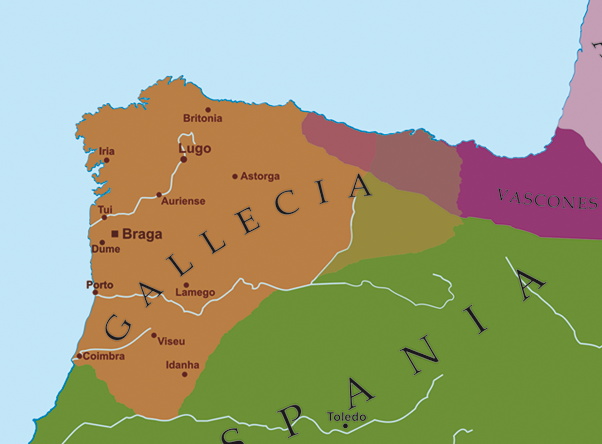
Historical geography of Galicia

Timeline of the Suebic Kings

According to Isidore of Seville, Remismund was a son of Maldras. Remismund's early career was spent as an ambassador between Galicia and Gaul, which trip he made several times. After an interregnum of approximately four years (460–464), during which the Sueves who had previously recognised Maldras as king were led by Frumar and those who had recognised Framta followed Rechimund while both their leaders fought for the throne, Remismund, returning from one of his embassies, succeeded in having himself recognised as king of a unified Suevic people. This occurred after Frumar's death, but scholars are not certain of the significance of that statement. Had Frumar become sole king? Or did Remismund initially succeed Frumar only over part of the Suevic nation? Furthermore, Remismund is sometimes identified with Rechimund.

Remismund was confirmed in the kingship when the Visigothic monarch, Theodoric II, sent him gifts, including weapons, and a Gothic princess for a wife. The involvement of Theodoric in the succession of Remismund has, however, been exaggerated by Jordanes, who claims that after the Gothic king put down the revolt and usurpation of Aioulf, he allowed the Suevi to elect a king of their own, and they chose Remismund. In 466, on the authority of Hydatius, Theodoric sent an envoy, Salla, to the court of Remismund. Remismund may have sent one Palagorius, a noble Galician, as an envoy to Theodoric, but it is possible that Palagorius went on a private mission.

In 465 he sacked Coimbra or Conímbriga and in 468 destroyed it, plundering the goods of a noble family called the Cantabri. In 469 the city of Lisbon was betrayed to the Suevi by a native Roman named Lusidius. Also in 469 Remismund began negotiations with the Roman Emperor Anthemius through a large embassy of Sueves led by Lusidius.

In 466 he requested an Arian missionary from the Gothic court and received Ajax, a Gaul or Galatian, who converted the Suevic nobility and established an Arian church in Galicia.

== Sources ==
- Arias, Jorge C. "Identity and Interactions: The Suevi and the Hispano-Romans." University of Virginia: Spring 2007.
- Thompson, E. A. Romans and Barbarians: The Decline of the Western Empire. Madison: University of Wisconsin Press, 1982. ISBN 0-299-08700-X.

== Notes ==
Preceded by Maldras	King of Galicia; 464–469	Succeeded by Theodemund
