= Aioulf =

- King of the Suevi
- Reign: 456–457
- Predecessor: Rechiar
- Successor: Remismund; Maldras
- Died: June 457; Porto

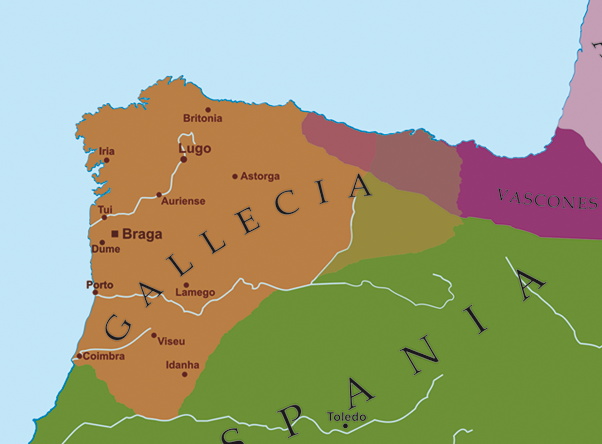
Dominions of the Suebian monarchy and extension of the kingdom of Galicia in the 5th century.

Aioulf or Ag(r)iwulf (died June 457) was an obscure king of Galicia from 456. In 448, after eight years in captivity, the Roman ambassador Censorius was executed by one Agiulf at Seville (Hispalis). This Agiulf has sometimes been identified with Aioulf.

Timeline of the Suebic Kings

According to the local and contemporary chronicler Hydatius, after the sack of Braga and the execution of Rechiar, the previous Suevic king, by the Visigoths, the Gothic king, Theodoric II, led his army south into Lusitania while one of his commanders, Aioulf, deserted him and remained behind in Galicia hoping to make himself king of the Sueves there.

However, the later, Pannonian historian Jordanes records that Aioulf was a Warnic cliens (retainer) of Theodoric appointed by the king to administer the Suevi and who, being provoked by the Suevi themselves, sought to make himself king but was defeated by Theodoric's army in the first engagement, captured, and executed in Porto in June 457.

According to E. A. Thompson, Jordanes is less reliable than Hydatius for three reasons: he lived further away both in time and space from events in Galicia, his record for accuracy is less reputable, and his bias for the Goths led him to make the disloyal Aioulf a Warni and to involve the Suevi themselves in the act of betraying Theodoric. More significantly, however, Jordanes mentions the Suevic bishops being greeted by Theodoric "with the reverence due to episcopal rank (pontificali reverentia)", an anachronism considering the Suevi were pagans in 457.

After Aioulf, the Suevi chose Remismund to be their king and he was accepted by Theodoric.

== Sources ==
- Thompson, E. A. "The Conversion of the Spanish Suevi to Catholicism." Visigothic Spain: New Approaches. ed. Edward James. Oxford: Oxford University Press, 1980. ISBN 0-19-822543-1.
- Thompson, E. A. "The End of Roman Spain: Part II." Nottingham Mediaeval Studies, xxi (1977), pp. 3–31. Reprinted as "The Suevic Kingdom of Galicia" in Romans and Barbarians: The Decline of the Western Empire. Madison: University of Wisconsin Press, 1982. pp. 161–187. ISBN 0-299-08700-X.

== Notes ==
Preceded by Rechiar	King of Galicia; 456–457	Succeeded by Maldras
