= Framta =

- King of the Suevi
- Reign: 457
- Predecessor: Rechiar
- Successor: Rechimund
- Died: 457

Framta, Framtan or Framtane (Latin: Framtanus, Spanish: Frantán; died 457) was one of the kings of the Suevi in Galicia in 457.

Timeline of the Suebic Kings

After the death of the Suevic king Rechiar, executed by the conquering Visigoths, and the Warnic king Aioulf, executed by his Visigothic masters for insubordination, the Suevi regrouped themselves and "set up" one of their own, Maldras, as king in 456. In 457, however, some of the Suevic people apparently abandoned Maldras and "called" Framta king. In light of the evidence of dynastic kingship among the Sueves, the instance of Maldras and Framta has been taken as indicative that the people retained some right to elect a king of their choosing at the end of a lineage.

Framta and Maldras, as well as their followers, acted independently of one another. While Framta reigned, Maldras led his Sueves into Lusitania. Framta died after a few months and there is debate whether the two Suevic factions were reunited under Maldras at that juncture or not. Framta's followers are soon found under the leadership of Rechimund, who was not king.

== Sources ==
- Thompson, E. A. Romans and Barbarians: The Decline of the Western Empire. Madison: University of Wisconsin Press, 1982. ISBN 0-299-08700-X.

== Notes ==
Preceded by Maldras	King of the Suevi; 457	Succeeded by Rechimund (not as king)
