= Richimund =

Rechimund
- Leader of the Suevi
- Reign: 457-464
- Predecessor: Framta
- Successor: Remismund

Timeline of the Suebic Kings

Richimund or Rechimund was a Suevic leader in Galicia from 457 until about 464. He was not recorded as a king (rex), though Hydatius wrote that inter Frumarium et Rechimundum oritur de regni potestate dissensio ("between Frumar and Rechimund arose a dissension of the power of the kingdom"). In 457 the Suevi split into two factions, one headed by Maldras raiding Lusitania and another led by Framta remaining in Galicia. After a few months of rule, Framta died and Rechimund appeared as his successor. While it is possible that the Suevi were living under a diarchy, it is more likely that the two factions remained independent of one another. Maldras' eventual successor, Frumar, was also not described as a king, but in 464 or thereabouts the entire Suevic nation was unified under a king named Remismund. Presumably, Rechimund and Frumar had battled for the throne and both had been eliminated, paving the way for Remismund. Some scholars have equated Remismund with Rechimund, but this seems far-fetched.

== Sources ==
- Thompson, E. A. "The End of Roman Spain: Part II." Nottingham Mediaeval Studies, xxi (1977), pp. 3–31. Reprinted as "The Suevic Kingdom of Galicia" in Romans and Barbarians: The Decline of the Western Empire. Madison: University of Wisconsin Press, 1982. pp. 161–187. ISBN 0-299-08700-X. See p. 167 for Rechimund.

Preceded by Framta	King of Galicia; 457–464	Succeeded by Remismund
