= Frumar =

- King of the Suevi
- Reign: 460–464
- Predecessor: Maldras
- Successor: Remismund
- Died: 464

Timeline of the Suebic Kings

Frumar (or Frumarius) (died 464) was a Suevic warlord who succeeded Maldras (who was assassinated in February 460), as leader of the Suevic group then raiding Lusitania. He probably competed with Rechimund, the Suevic war leader in Gallaecia, for the throne until his death.

In 460, by the action of two Roman nobles, Ospinio and Ascanius, the Visigothic army harassing Frumar's Sueves was caused to retreat. Later that same year Frumar ravaged the town of Aquae Flaviae with the complicity of the Romans. He captured the bishop and chronicler Hydatius, holding him prisoner for three months before releasing, against the pleas of Ospinio and Ascanius. The Hispano-Roman nobility of western Iberia was becoming accommodated to Suevic rule.

== Sources ==
- Thompson, E. A. (1982). Romans and Barbarians: The Decline of the Western Empire. Madison: University of Wisconsin Press. ISBN 0-299-08700-X.

== Notes ==
Preceded by Maldras	Suevic leader 460–464	Succeeded by Remismund as king
