= Rechiar =

- King of the Suevi
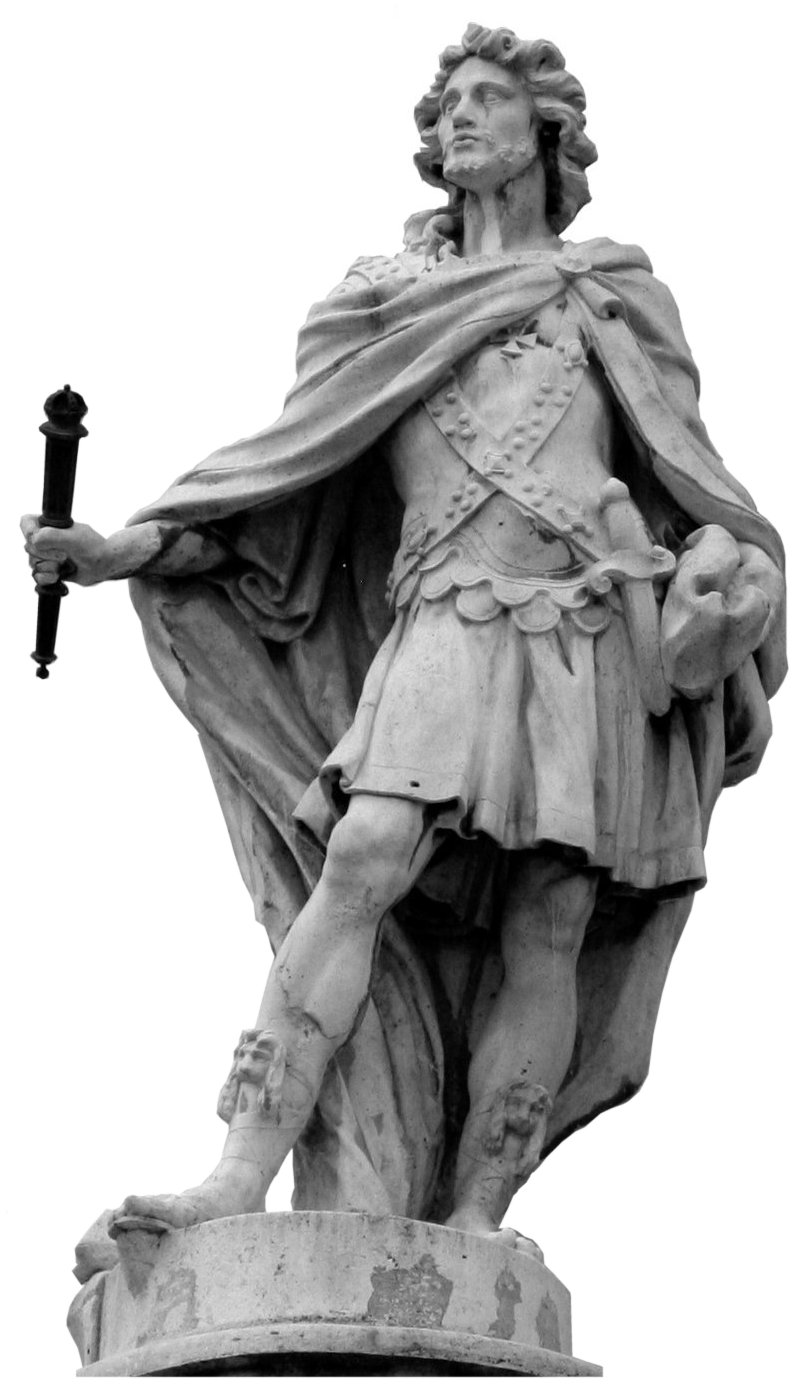
- Statue of Rechiar, Suebic King of Galicia (sculpted 1750–1753), Royal Palace of Madrid, Spain.
- Reign: 448–456
- Predecessor: Rechila
- Successor: Aioulf
- Born: c. 415
- Died: December 456; Porto
- Father: Rechila
- Mother: a Visigothic princess
- Religion: Nicene Christianity prev. Germanic paganism

Rechiar or Flavius Rechiarius (after 415 – December 456) was the third Suevic king of Gallaecia, from 448 until his death, and also the first one to be born in Gallaecia. He was one of the most innovative and belligerent of the Suevi monarchs. Hydatius, the contemporary bishop and chronicler from Galicia who is the sole contemporary source for biographical details of Rechiar, established his reputation as that of a barbarian with little sense of Roman law, culture, or custom; accusations already discredited, but very common at that time. He was the first Germanic king who professed Nicene Christianity.

== Religion ==
Timeline of the Suebic Kings

Rechiar was almost certainly not raised Christian, though some scholars have raised the contention that his father raised him that way in order to foster good relations with the Church and the Romanized population who were, for the most part, Catholics as well. What is certain is the Rechiar had been converted (catholicus factus according to Isidore's Historia Suevorum) before reaching the throne. Rechiar's conversion to Trinitarianism predated that of the more famous Clovis of the Franks by half a century. The argument was even raised in the late nineteenth century that the Spanish church had primacy over the French because Rechiar's conversion predated Clovis'. Rechiar was the son of the pagan Flavius Rechila, whom he succeeded on the throne, and a daughter of the Visigothic king Wallia. The date and circumstances of Rechiar's conversion are unknown and it is possible that Roman missionaries took some part in it, since he was not converted to the Arianism which was preached by the Visigothic missionaries. Rechiar was one of the only Suevi to convert at that time; also he preserved his ancestral beliefs and his people remained pagan. Hydatius records opposition, possibly secret, to his succession, but the basis of this opposition he does not mention. It is not inconceivable that it was religiously motivated.

Rechiar married an Arian Visigothic princess from Toulouse, the daughter of Theodoric I. The marriage of Catholic to Arian was not advantageous for the church of the former and the influence of Rechiar's queen and another later Arian queen helped bring about the conversion of the Suevi not to Catholicism, but to Arianism. If Rechiar did make any effort to convert his people to his faith, it was entirely ephemeral and "bore no detectable fruit".

== Administration ==
Rechiar was a powerful enough ruler to mint his own coinage, on which he had stamped the legend ivssv rechiari reges. Indeed, he was the first Germanic king to mint coins (siliquae) bearing his name and the first to claim the right (iussu) to mint them, in Latin legend: "IVSSV RECHIARI REGES" ("By order of King Rechiar"). Rechiar's kingship was "primitive" enough, however, that it appears he took the royal thesaurus (treasure) with him on his campaigns. Despite Hydatius' misrepresentation of Rechiarius, he was the first Suevic king to be born in Gallaecia and with a Roman education, like many Gallico-Roman leaders of the time, thanks to which he also gained influence in the autochthonous social layers. He kept his capital at Braga.

== Wars ==
Rechiar was a bellicose ruler, who made war on all of his neighbours. In 448, at the commencement of his reign, the Roman count Censorius was executed at Seville by a Suevic nobleman named Agiulf. It has been surmised by some that this act was connected with Rechiar's warlike attitude towards Rome. He even allied with the Bagaudae in ravaging the Ebro valley, a unique occurrence between Germanic rulers and local peasant rebels. Rechiar also impelled the first contact between the Suevi and the Basques: he made war on them in February 449. The expedition may have been a mere raid or an attempted conquest of Vasconia as a prelude to the conquest of the Ebro valley. Later in 449 he visited his father-in-law in Gaul. On his return home to Galicia, Rechiar allied with Basilius, leader of one of the Bagaudae, and raided the Ebro valley, attacking Caesaraugusta and even entering Ilerda (Lleida) "by a trick". He took many prisoners, but he failed to take the region and thus complete the Suevic conquest of Hispania. Rechiar did not approach Tarragona, the provincial capital.

Unlike his father-in-law, he did not take part in the battle of the Catalaunian Plains in 451.

Following the assassination of the patrician Flavius Aëtius and the emperors Valentinian III and Petronius Maximus in 455, Rechiar led an attack on Carthaginiensis, probably with the intent of conquest. Later that year he attacked the province of Hispania Tarraconensis, the only province of Hispania still under Roman control, but did not conquer it. According to Jordanes, he had "presumed" on the basis of his relationship to the Visigothic king and Roman foederatus Theodoric II (his brother-in-law), that he could rule all of Hispania. Theodoric, acting on the orders of the emperor Avitus, invaded Hispania in 456 with an army of Goths, Franks, Burgundians (under their kings Chilperic I and Gundioch), and perhaps even Romans to confront the Suevi, who in turn planned to meet the invaders on the borders of Tarraconensis. On 5 October 456 Theodoric defeated Rechiar in a battle at the Campus Paramus twelve miles from Astorga on the Urbicus (Órbigo). He was wounded during the battle, but according to Hydatius managed to flee as far as Porto in the heart of his kingdom, while Jordanes says he took ship in the Tyrrhenian Sea (i.e., the western Mediterranean) before winds forced him back and he was captured. Jordanes is almost certainly wrong; at Porto Rechiar was captured and executed in December. The Suevic monarchy collapsed, rapidly disintegrating into rival factions over the following years. Braga fell on 28 October and the Visigoths brutally sacked the city and the churches before moving on to conquer Baetica During the century of Arianism that soon commenced, nothing about the Suevi was recorded.

== Notes ==
Preceded by Rechila	King of Galicia; 448–456	Succeeded by Aioulf
