= Hydatius =

5th-century bishop and historian

Hydatius, also spelled Idacius (c. 400 – c. 469) was a late Western Roman writer and clergyman. The bishop of Aquae Flaviae in the Roman province of Gallaecia (almost certainly the modern Chaves, Portugal, in the modern district of Vila Real), he was the author of a chronicle of his own times that provides us with our best evidence for the history of Hispania in the 5th century.

== Biography ==
Hydatius was born around the year 400 in the environs of Civitas Lemica, a Roman town near modern Xinzo de Limia in the Spanish Galician province of Ourense. As a young boy, he travelled as a pilgrim to the Holy Land with his mother, where he met Jerome in his hermitage at Bethlehem. About the year 417 he joined the clergy, and in 427 was consecrated bishop probably of Chaves (the Roman Aquae Flaviae) in Gallaecia. As bishop he had to come to terms with the presence of non-Roman powers, especially a succession of kings of the Suevi, in a province where imperial control became increasingly nominal during the course of his lifetime. The Suevi had settled in Gallaecia in 411, and there was constant friction between them and the local Hispano-Roman provincials. In this context, Hydatius took part in a deputation of the year 431 requesting assistance in dealing with the Suevi from the general Flavius Aëtius, the most important representative of the imperial government in the West.

Along with this concern, Hydatius devoted himself to rooting out heresy, not just in his own episcopal diocese, but in the rest of Hispania as well. He was in frequent contact with some important bishops of the day, including Thoribius of Astorga and Antoninus of Mérida. Together with Thoribius, he petitioned Pope Leo I for assistance and advice in dealing with heresy. Though Hydatius consistently characterizes Hispanian heretics as Manichees, it is generally believed that he meant Priscillianists, followers of the ascetic bishop Priscillian, who had been condemned as a heretic by several church councils and executed as a magician by the emperor Magnus Maximus around 385. We know very little else about Hydatius's life, though we know he was kidnapped and imprisoned for a time in 460 by local enemies, which suggests he played an important role in the internal politics of Roman Gallaecia.

Hydatius probably died in 468 or shortly after, since at that point his chronicle breaks off abruptly.

== Chronicle ==
Hydatius's main claim to historical importance is the chronicle he wrote towards the end of his life. The chronicle was a very popular historical genre in Late Antiquity, though with precedents in older chronographic genres like the Fasti consulares. A consciously Christian genre, the main goal of the chronicle was to place human history in the context of a linear progression from creation according Genesis to the Second Coming of Christ. Under the entry for each year one or several events were listed, usually with great brevity. The greatest exponent of the form had been the fourth-century bishop Eusebius of Caesarea. Jerome brought the Greek chronicle of Eusebius of Caesarea up to date as far as the year 378, after translating it into Latin. Jerome's translation and continuation proved very popular, and others decided to continue Jerome in the same way.

Hydatius was one such continuator. His continuation begins with a preface explaining his debt to Jerome, and then picks up in the year 379. Hydatius had access to a number of chronographic and historical sources and used four parallel chronological systems. Because of this, and particularly towards the end of the chronicle, it can be difficult to translate his chronology into any modern calendar. At the beginning, Hydatius's continuation offers relatively little information for each year. He narrates the events from 427 onward as a contemporary witness and the text becomes increasingly full as the years progress until it resembles an organic literary work more than a typical chronicle.

Hydatius's main concern throughout is to show the dissolution of civil society in the western Roman empire and in Hispania in particular, and he paints a very dark picture of fifth-century life. His deep pessimism may stem from a belief in the imminent end of the world, since he had read the apocryphal letter of Christ to Thomas, which was interpreted to show that the world would end in May 482. Hydatius may thus have believed that he was chronicling the world's last days, and on occasion he deliberately distorted his account to show events in a gloomier light. This is especially true of the narrative climax of his account, the sack in 456 of the Suevi capital at Braga by the Visigothic king Theodoric II, acting in the service of the Roman emperor Avitus. Regardless of his sometimes very sophisticated literary devices, Hydatius's chronicle is an essential source of information for reconstructing the course of fifth-century events. Moreover, it is our only source for the history of Hispania in the period up to 468, at which point the narrative breaks off.

It is doubtful whether Hydatius is also the author of the Fasti consulares for the years 245–468, appended to the Chronicle in the only almost complete manuscript in our possession. The Chronicle is printed in Migne, P.L. vol. 51, 873–890, and vol. 74, 701–750; the Fasti Consulares are found in P.L., vol. 51, 891–914.

== editions ==
(chronologically)

- Mommsen, Theodor, ed. Chronica minora saec. IV.V.VI.VII., volumen II. (Monumenta Germaniae Historica, Auctores Antiquissimi, vol. 11.). Berlin: Weidmann, 1894 (this was for a long time the standard edition, and its chapter numbering is still frequently cited)
- Burgess, R.W., ed. and trans. The Chronicle of Hydatius and the Consularia Constantinopolitana. Oxford: Clarendon Press, 1993 (with Latin and English translation on facing pages; the chapter numbering differs from Mommsen's.).
- Kötter, Jan-Markus; Scardino, Carlo (ed., trans. and comm.). Chronik des Hydatius. Fortführung der spanischen Epitome. Kleine und fragmentarische Historiker der Spätantike, vol. G9–10. Paderborn: Schöningh, 2019, ISBN 978-3-506-78915-0.

== Sources ==
- Arce, Javier. "El catastrofismo de Hydacio y los camellos de la Gallaecia." In: Los últimos romanos en Lusitania. (Cuaderno Emeritenses 10.) Edited by A. Velázquez, E. Cerrillo and P. Mateos. Mérida: Museo Nacional de Arte Romano, 1995, pp. 219–229. (An example of Hydatius's literary sophistication.)
- Börm, Henning. "Hydatius von Aquae Flaviae und die Einheit des Römischen Reiches im fünften Jahrhundert." In: Griechische Profanhistoriker des fünften nachchristlichen Jahrhunderts. Edited by B. Bleckmann and T. Stickler. Stuttgart: Franz Steiner Verlag, 2014, pp. 195–214. (Börm argues that Hydatius saw the Roman Empire as an undivided whole even after 395.)
- Gillett, Andrew. Envoys and Political Communication in the Late Antique West, 411-533. Cambridge: Cambridge University Press, 2003 (esp. ch. 2).
- Kulikowski, Michael. Late Roman Spain and Its Cities. Baltimore: Johns Hopkins University Press, 2004.
- Muhlberger, Steven. The Fifth-Century Chroniclers: Prosper, Hydatius, and the Gallic Chronicler of 452. Leeds: Francis Cairns, 1990.
- Herbermann, Charles, ed. (1913). "Hydatius of Lemica". Catholic Encyclopedia. New York: Robert Appleton Company.
- A. Palo, La Cronaca dei Due Imperi (vol. II). Il Chronicon di Idazio Vescovo (A.D. 379-468 & Fasti Hydatiani). Introduzione, traduzione e note a cura di A. Palo, Edizioni Il Saggio - Centro Culturale Studi Storici, Eboli-Castellabate, 2022
