= Portuguese vocabulary =

Most of the Portuguese vocabulary comes from Latin because Portuguese is a Romance language.

Historical map of the Portuguese language (Galaico-português) since the year 1,000

However, other languages that came into contact with it have also left their mark. In the thirteenth century, the lexicon of Portuguese had about 80% words of Latin origin and 20% of pre-Roman Gallaecian and Celtiberian, Germanic, Greek and Arabic origin.

== Pre-Roman languages of Portugal ==
Pre-Roman languages of Iberia circa 300 BC

Traces of the languages from native peoples of western Iberia (Gallaeci, Lusitanians, Celtici or Conii) persist in Portuguese, as shown below. Even though the Portuguese often call themselves Lusitanians, the linguistic classification of Lusitanian is controversial, and the Lusitanian linguistic contribution to the Portuguese-Galician language remains unconfirmed. In fact, most of the pre-Roman placenames or rivers in Portugal originate from the Hispano-Celtic Gallaecian and Celtiberian languages. There are few Iberian, Basque, and Tartessian components in Portuguese.

A project by the Social Sciences and Humanities Research Council of Canada, led by Professor Leonard A. Curchin of Classical Studies at the University of Waterloo (ON), concluded that the place-names of the Lusitanian province of the Roman Empire found to date, are classified as follows: Celtic (30%), other Indo-European (33.5%) [possibly Ligurian, Etruscan, Old-European, Illyrian], Pre-Indo-European (2%), Iberian (2%), Latin (18%), and 15.5% of place names of undefined origin.

=== List of Portuguese words of Iberian and Basque origin ===
==== Iberian-Basque ====
- manteiga "butter" ***Uncertain origin, possibly Lat. mantica

Projections on Iberian vocabulary, toponyms and derivations in Portuguese, indicate just a few dozen words in total.

==== Basque ====
The Basque influence in Portuguese is believed to have entered mainly through Spanish, because many of those who took part in the Reconquista and later repopulation campaigns in Portugal, were of Basque lineage.

- carrasco "executioner" or "Portuguese oak", from Basque karraska "thunder, crash of falling tree"
- sarna "scabies" from Medieval Latin (7th century, Isidore of Seville, Origines, 4.8.68), but as serna attested in Theodorus Priscianus (Constantinople, 4th century). Trumper (2004) however, after studying the variants of the word in the Latin medical treatises, proposes a Hispano-Celtic origin; cf. Middle Welsh sarn "mess" and sarnaf "to wreck".

===== Names of Basque origin =====
====== Forenames ======
- Inácio variant of Ignatius. ***Of uncertain origin. Often claimed an Etruscan-Latinised derivation but probably Pre-Roman Iberian, Celtiberian or Basque see* Íñigo, Íñaki
  Variants: Egnatius (Ancient Roman), Iñaki (Basque), Ignasi (Catalan), Ignác (Czech), Ignaas (Dutch), Iggy (English), Ignace (French), Ignatz (German), Ignác (Hungarian), Ignazio (Italian), Ignas (Lithuanian), Ignacy (Polish), Ignatiy (Russian), Ignac, Ignacij, Nace (Slovene), Ignacio, Nacho, Nacio (Spanish)
- Vasco derived from Basque "belasko", 'small raven'
- Xavier, from Basque Xabier, from etxe berri, meaning 'new house' or 'new home'
- Ximeno, a variant of the medieval Basque given name Semen, root seme < senbe 'son' as found in the ancient Aquitanian name Sembetten, attested form "sehi" as 'child', hypothetical ancient root *seni (cf. Koldo Mitxelena and modern form "senide" = 'brother or sister', 'relative')

====== Surnames ======
- Velasco derived from Basque "belasko", 'small raven'

==== Celtic ====
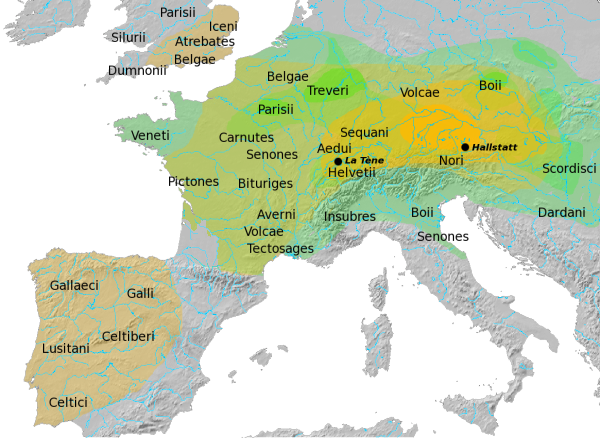
Overview of the Hallstatt and La Tène cultures

Although there is not a comprehensive study or wordcount on how much Celtic, (particularly Gallaecian and words from the Hispano-Celtic group) survived in Portuguese (and Galician); it is fair to say that after Latin, this is the second largest component in the Portuguese culture and language. Projections on Celtic vocabulary (some words may have come via French borrowings starting in the 12th century), toponyms and derivations in Portuguese, indicate over 3,000 words. The Celtic substratum is often overlooked, due to the strong Latinisation of Celtic-derived words in Portuguese and the ancient linguistic threads of pre-Roman origin.

=== List of Portuguese words of Celtic origin ===
==== Placenames ====
Celtic name	Modern location/town name
Anobra	Anobra *Likely derived from ānniyobris "hill,"ring" (Cf. old Irish ainne "ring"),
Aritium oppidum vetus	Casal da Várzea
Aritium Vetus	Alvega
Ardila	Ardila
Armona	Ilha de Armona
Arauca	Arouca
Equabonna/Aquabona	Coina
Axabrica/Axabrix	Xabregas
Boidobr(ig)a	Boidobra, a combination of two elements: 1. *boudi or *boudo- 'victory' (Welsh budd 'gain, benefit') and 2. "briga".
Bracara	Braga
Brigantia	Bragança
Budens	Budens
Caetobriga/Caetobrix/Kaitobrix	Setúbal
Calabria > Caliabriga	Castelo Calabre
Cambra<Calambriga	Vale de Cambra (Aveiro), Casal de Cambra (Sintra)
Cale	Vila Nova de Gaia; Portucale; Portugal
Castralbo(a)	Penalva do Castelo
Caxarias from the Celtic root *cax, oak-tree
Colobre	Alcolobre *(Colobre, 935 C.E.): the first element derives from *kʷolu- 'wheel'
Conímbriga	Conímbriga *Coimbra,
Corucho*	Coruche,*
Civitas Aravorum <Aravi>	Marialva
Collippo	Leiria
Ebora	Évora
Eburobrittium	Óbidos
Jurumegna	Juromenha
Lacobriga	Lagos
Lamecum	Lamego
Lemos	Lemos, Lemenar, Lemenhe
Londobris	Berlengas
Longobriga	Longroiva
Civitas Aravorum <Aravi>	Marialva (Mêda)
Malaceca/Malateca	Marateca
Mirobriga	Miróbriga
Moron	Castelo de Almorol
Pendraganum	Pedrógão Grande
Terena	Terena

=== Names ===
==== Forenames ====
Portuguese name	Origin and meaning
Artur	Arthur * The meaning of this name is unknown. It could be derived from the Celtic elements artos "bear" combined with viros "man" or rigos "king". Alternatively it could be related to an obscure Roman family name Artorius.
António	
Brandão	Brendanus * Latinized form of the Irish name Bréanainn, which was derived from a Welsh word meaning "prince". Saint Brendan was a 6th-century Irish abbot who, according to legend, crossed the Atlantic and reached North America with 17 other monks.
Breno	Brennus * Latinized form of a Celtic name (or title) that possibly meant either "king, prince" or "raven". Brennus was a Gallic leader of the 4th century BC who attacked and sacked Rome.
Brígida	Brighid * Irish, meaning "exalted one". In Irish mythology this was the name of the goddess of fire, poetry and wisdom, the daughter of the god Dagda.
Tristão	Drust * Pictish name probably derived from Celtic drest meaning "riot" or "tumult". This name was borne by several kings of the Picts, including their last king Drust X, who ruled in the 9th century.
Viriato	Viriathus * From the Latinised name Viriathus or Viriatus, derived from Celtic viriae ("bracelets"). Viriathus was a leader of the Lusitani (a tribe of Portugal) who rebelled against Roman rule in the 2nd century BC.

==== Surnames ====
A considerable number of the Portuguese surnames (spread in all Portuguese-speaking countries and ex-colonies today) is Celtic or of Latinised, Celtic-borrowings. This is not a comprehensive list of those.

===== A – L =====
- Abrunheiro, Abrunho, Abrunhosa, from Protoceltic *agrīnio,
- Arouca, Aroucas, Arouquela Latinised from Celtic *arauca
- Bacelar, Bacelo, from *baccos- 'young man, lad' akin to Gaulish and Breton bach
- Bico, Bicudo, also Bica, Bicalho, from Proto-Celtic *bekko 'beak, kiss', cognate of Italian becco, French bec.
- Carqueijo, Carquejo, Carqueja 'gorse', from Celtic *carcasia, *querquesia, or similar.< Indo-European *pérkus|*pérkus ~ *pr̥kʷéu-|t=oak. Compare pre-Roman tribal name M_{la} Querquerni
- Carvalho, Carvalhal, Carvalheiro, Carvalha, Carvalhedo, Carvalhinho, from Celtic (s)kerb(h)/karb (hard, twisted).
- Caxaria, Caxarias, Caxigo, from the Celtic root *cax < CASSĪCOS ‘oak-tree’
- Cerveja also Cervejaria from Vulgar Latin *cerevisia derived from Gaulish Cognates: Old French cervoise, Provençal, Spanish cerveza; akin to Old Irish coirm, Welsh cwrw, Breton korev.
- Coelho, Coelhos, Coelhoso also Coelha, Coelhas, from Irish coinân, Cornish conyn, Manx coneeyn, Gaelic coineanach, Welsh cwningen, alternatively from Celtiberian *cun-icos 'little dog'
- Colmeia, from a Celtic form *kolmēnā 'made of straw', from *kolmos 'straw', which gave Leonese cuelmo; cf. Welsh calaf "reed, stalk", Cornish kalav "straw", Breton kolo "stalk").
- Colmeiro, Colmeiro, Colmo, Colme, from Celtic *kolmos 'straw', which gave Leonese cuelmo; cf. Welsh calaf "reed, stalk", Cornish kalav "straw", Breton kolo "stalk").
- Lage, Lages, Laginha also Laginhas from the medieval form lagena, from proto-Celtic *ɸlāgenā, cognate of Old Irish lágan, láigean, Welsh llain 'broad spearhead, blade'; akin to Irish láighe 'mattock, spade'.
- Lemos, from Celtic lemo, elm-tree.
- Lotsa, Louza, Lousão, Lousã, Lousado, Louzado, Loisa, Lousano, also Lousan, Lousada from Proto-Celtic *laws

===== M – Z =====
- Magalhães, also Magalhaes and Magalhã from Celtic magal 'great, grandiose'. Toponymic of towns with the same name.
- Menino, from medieval mennino, from proto-Celtic *menno-, akin to Old Irish menn 'kid (goat)', Irish meannán, Welsh myn, Breton menn.
- Minhoca, from medieval form *milocca, from Proto-Celtic *mîlo-, akin to Asturian milu, merucu 'earthworm', Irish míol 'worm, maggot', Welsh, Breton mil 'animal'
- Queirós, also Queiroz, from Proto-Celtic *wroikos-, referring to the specific heather variety 'Erica umbellata'.
- Rego, also Rêgo from proto-Celtic *ɸrikā 'furrow, ditch', akin to Welsh rhych, Breton reg, Scottish/Irish riach 'trace left from something'; cognate of French raie, Occitan, Catalan rega, Basque erreka, Italian riga 'wrinkle'.
- Seara, also Seareiro, Senra, from medieval senara, a Celtic compound of *seni- 'apart, separated' (cf. Old Irish sain 'alone', Welsh han 'other') and *aro- 'ploughed field'. (cf. Welsh âr, Irish ár 'ploughed field').
- Truta, from Celtic *tructa- freshwater fish of the salmon family. Cognate of French truite, English trout, Catalan truita, Spanish trucha, Italian trota.
- Vassalo Latinised 'vassalum' from proto-Celtic *wasto-, cognate of French vassal, Spanish vasallo, Middle Irish foss 'servant', Welsh gwas 'servant; lad', Breton gwaz

=== General vocabulary ===
- abanqueiro [m] 'waterfall' < *'(beaver) dam', formally a derivative in -arium of *abanco, from Proto-Celtic *abankos 'beaver, water demon' cognate of Old Irish abacc 'dwarf', Welsh afanc 'beaver, dwarf', Breton avank 'dwarf, sea monster'. Akin also to Arpitan avans 'wicker'.
- alvo [m] 'white', from Celtic albo* 'white'.
  derivatives: alvura 'whiteness', alvorada 'dawn', alvor 'light, whiteness', alvorecer [v] 'daybreak'.
- amieiro [m] 'common alder', *likely a derivative in -arium of *abona 'river', related to Breton avon, Welsh afon, Irish abha/abhainn 'river'.
  derivatives: amieiral 'alder woods', amieira 'young alder tree or hand-basket made of alder or chestnut shoots'. A Galician suggestion points to another Celtic voice ameia
- arpente also arpento 'arpent acre' Latin borrowing (old measurement) likely from Gaulish *arpen or arepennis, cognate of French arpent, Spanish arapende akin to Old Irish airchenn 'short mete, bound (abuttal); end, extremity', Welsh arbenn 'chief'
- abrolho 'sprout, thorn, thicket, rocky surfaces just under water, keys', from Celtic *brogilos 'copse',.
  derivatives: abrolhar [v] 'to cover with thorns, to sprout (botanics), to get covered in spots, blisters, to sprout', abrolhamento 'to fence smthg with thorns, cover with sprouts, to cause hardship', desabrolhar [v] 'to sprout, to bloom, to blossom'.
- abrunho/abrunheiro [m] 'sloe', from Vulgar Latin *aprūneu, from Latin prūnum, under the influence of Celtic *agrīnio; akin to Irish áirne, Welsh eirin 'plum'; cognate of Occitan agranhon, Provençal agreno, Catalan aranyó, Aragonese arañon.
- bacelo [m] 'young vine', from Celtic *baccos- 'young man, lad' akin to Gaulish and Breton bach
  derivatives: baceleiro[m] 'young vine nursery, man who specialises in planting new vines', bacelar [v], abacelar [v] 'to plant and tender to new vines', abacelamento 'the act of sorting out young vines (by variety)', bacharelato 'baccalaureat, university degree', Latinised from *baccalaris- person of lower (military) rank or young cadet, bacharel 'same as baccalaureat, chatter-box, chatty or witty person', bacharelar [v] 'to talk too much', bacharelice, bacharelismo 'habit of chatting too much or for too long', barcelo 'white grape variety from Northern Portugal'
- badalo[m] 'bell, penis' from Latinised 'battua'< Gaul. *bathu < Celt. *bathi or *baeti
  derivatives: abadalar[v] or badalar[v], 'to ring a bell, to jabber, to gossip or chat away'.
- balaia [f] also balaio 'small straw-basket' via Old French baleen 'broom (plant)', from Gaul *balatno, metathesis of *banatlo, cognate of Breton balannen, Scots-Gaelic bealaidh, Irish beallaidh, Welsh banadl, Cornish banadhel, Asturian baléu
- barco [m] 'boat, ship' from Proto-Celtic *barga-, loanward into Latin bargo, 'boat'.
- barra [f] 'garret, loft, upper platform', from proto-Celtic *barro-, cognate of Irish, Breton barr 'summit, peak, top', Welsh bar.
  derivatives: barrote [m] 'wooden beam'
- barrete [m] 'hood', from Celtic or Gaulish *birros-'short coat with a hood'.
  derivatives: barretada 'greeting someone with your hat', barrete-de-clérigo 'fortification or building work composed of three protruding angles and two sinking ones', enfiar o barrete (popular expression) 'to mislead or deceive someone'.
- bétula [f] 'birch', Latin "betulla," borrowed from Gaulish *betua-, from Proto-Celtic *betwiyos- or *betuyā-, ultimately tracing back to the Proto-Indo-European *gʷet-. This root is associated with the concept of "birch" or "wood," suggesting a connection between the tree and the material it provides.
- bico [m] 'beak, kiss', from Proto-Celtic *bekko-, cognate of Italian becco, French bec.
  derivatives: bicar 'to kiss', debicar [v] '(bird)pecking'.
- bilha, [f] 'spigot; stick' to Proto-Celtic *beljo- 'tree, trunk', akin to Old Irish bille 'large tree, tree trunk', Manx billey 'tree', Welsh pill 'stump', Breton pil; cognate of French bille 'log, chunk of wood'.
- bode [m] 'billy-goat, male goat' from Proto-Celtic *bukko- akin to French bouc, loanword into Dutch bok.
- boi [m] 'bull, male cow' Latinised form, from Celtic *bou'cow'.
  derivatives: boi-cavalo yak, boieiro cow herder, cowboy, garça-boieira cattle-egret, boiuno bovine.
- borba [f] 'mud, slime, mucus', from proto-Celtic *borwâ-, cognate of French bourbe 'mud'; akin to Irish borb 'mud, slime', bearbh 'boiling', Welsh berw 'boiling', Breton berv 'broth, bubbling'.
  derivatives: borbotar [v], 'to blossom, to bloom', borbulhar [v] 'to burble, to boil', borbulha 'bubble, spot, pimple', borbulhante 'bubbly'.
- borne [m] 'terminal, metal part of an electrical circuit that connects to an external electrical circuit, inner bark of a tree, lukewarm' from Proto-Celtic *botina 'troop', akin to Old Irish buiden and Welsh byddin 'army' (*budīnā).
  derivatives: bornear [v] 'to align an object with the view, generally closing one eye, to put a gun/weapon to aim, i.e.: to aim a cannon'.
- braga [f] '[Old] Hoop iron that held the fetter, male type of trouser, wall that served as a fortification junk, type of naval crane to lift and move weights (ships), small four-string type of guitar'. From [Proto-Celtic] *braco-, cognate of Galician, Spanish, Occitan braga, French braie, Italian brache.
  derivatives: braguilha [f] 'trouser-flier, braguinha [f] 'small guitar', bragal [m] 'coarse fabric whose plot is cord, underclothes, old measurement for land demarcation: Portion of a farm (7 or 8 poles) which served as the unit price in certain contracts, set of bucks and fetter', desbragar [v] 'to make dissolute, profligate, to drop your buckles', desbragado [m] 'riotous, foul-mouthed, indecorous, libertine, dissolute, immoral', desbragadamente 'indecorously', desbragamento [m] 'riotous quality, ribaldry, impropriety (behaviour), Bracarense 'relating to Braga, native of that city', brácaro 'a person native of Braga', bracamarte 'old claymore sword which was swung with both hands'.
- brim [m] 'fabric, thread, brime' via Fra. 'brin' < Breton *brienen-
- brio [m] 'pride, courage, might, power', from Italian brio, from Catalan/Old Occitan briu 'wild', from Celtic *brigos, cognate of Occitan briu, Old French brif 'finesse, style'; akin to Old Irish bríg 'power', Welsh bri 'prestige, authority', Breton bri 'respect'.
  derivatives: brioso 'proud, brave, exuberant', briosamente 'proudly, with dignity', desbrio 'lacking pride or courage, a cowardly act', desbrioso 'someone who acts without pride, a coward, a wimp'
- cabra [f] 'goat' Latinised 'capra' from Celtic *gabro- (OIr gabor, OB gabr, gl. caprus, OC gauar, gl. uel capelia, C (in LNN)gaver, ModW gafr, CPNE: 102, DGVB: 173, GPC: 1370–71; PECA: 48). Well attested in G PNN, Gabrus, Gabrius, Gabar, etc. (DLG: 173–74). Formation *kpro- IEW 529 (s.v. *kapro-). ACPN: 79–80; PNPG, Celtic Elements, s.v.; RGC: 172–73. Note that not all LNN in gabro- are by default Celtic; see A. Falileyev, Celtic presence in Dobrudja: Onomastic evidence, in Ethnic Contacts and Cultural Exchanges North and West of the Black Sea from Greek Colonization to the Ottoman Conquest (Iaśi 2005), 296–303.
- cais [m] 'quay, jetty', maybe from French (itself from Norman) quai, from proto-Celtic *kag-yo-, akin to Welsh cae, Cornish ke, Breton kae 'hedge'; French chai 'cellar'.
- camba [f] 'wheel rim' from proto-Celtic *kambo-, cognate of Old Irish camm 'crooked, bent, curved'. Cognate of Occitan cambeta 'part of plough', Limousin Occitan chambija (< *cambica) 'part of plough'.
  derivatives: cambada, cambeira 'coil; crooked log for hanging fish', cambela 'type of plough', cambota 'beam', encambar [v] 'to string, to entangle', cambo 'pole, bent', cambaio, cambão 'crooked, lame', cambar [v] 'to change, to alter, to move direction (nautical)', cambalhota 'tumble, gambol', cambalhotar 'to caper, to tumble'.
- camboa [f] 'trap, hole dug for capturing fish trapped at low tide', from Celtic *combā 'valley' or *cambos 'bent'.
- cambueira [f] 'fishing net used for low tide catch', from Celtic *combā 'valley' or *cambos 'bent'.
- caminho [m] 'pathway', from Vulgar Latin *cammīnus, from proto-Celtic *kanxsman-, cognate of Italian cammino, French chemin, Spanish camino, Catalan camí, Occitan camin, Old Irish céimm, Breton cam 'step'.
  derivatives: caminhar 'to walk', caminhada 'walk, journey', caminhante, caminheiro 'hiker, walker, someone who loves to walk, pilgrim', caminheira 'sort of locomotive used in road transportation', caminhável 'area or place adept/safe to walk'
- camisa [f] 'shirt' from Latin, from Gaulish camisia. cognate of Spanish/Occitan camisa, Italian camicia, French chainse.
  derivatives: camisola 'jersey', camiseta 'undershirt, singlet', camisa-de-dormir 'nightgown', camisa-de-Venus or camisinha 'condom' (colloquial)
- candado, cando [m] dry tree-branch, stick or trunk, horse hoof, from Celtic *kando- 'bright, white', cognate of Welsh cann 'bright, light'
- canga [f] 'collar, yoke', from Celtic *kambika.
- cangalha [f] 'shoulder yoke, saddle yoke', from Celtic *kambika.
- cangalheta [f] 'rustic saddle, horse saddle', from Celtic *kambika.
- cangalho [m] 'worthless, trashy person or worn out animal', from Celtic *kambika.
- canto [m] 'rim, corner', from proto-Celtic *kanto-, akin to Old Irish cét 'round stone pillar, Welsh cant 'tire rim', Breton kant 'disk'; cognate of Old French chant, Occitan cant.
  derivatives: cantoneiro 'road worker', cantonar[v] 'railway traffic control', recanto 'corner', cantinho 'small corner', Cantão, Cantonal 'Swiss Canton, relating to Canton's legal affairs or government, acantoar[v] or acantonar 'to hide, to isolate', canteiro 'vegetable plot, flowerbed, border', acanteirar[v], encanteirar 'to place/arrange in pods'(gardening, bottles, etc.), encanteirado 'in a pod', cantonado 'engraved corner (heraldry)'.
- carqueja, carqueijeira[f] 'gorse', from Celtic *carcasia, *querquesia, or similar.< Indo-European *pérkus|*pérkus ~ *pr̥kʷéu-|t=oak. Compare pre-Roman tribal name M_{la} Querquerni.
- carquilha[f] 'wrinkle, crinkle, furrow', from Celtic *carquila.
  derivatives: encarquilhar[v] 'to crinkle', encarquilhado 'wrinkled, with deep (skin) wrinkles'.
- carro [m] 'cart, wagon', from Vulgar Latin carrum, from proto-Celtic *karro-, cognate of Rumanian car, Italian carro, French char, Provençal car, Spanish carro; akin to Irish carr, Welsh car, Breton karr.
  derivatives: carroça 'cart', carregar 'to load', acarretar, acartar 'to cart, to carry', carreta 'cart', carrear 'to guide animals in a cart, to drive', carroçaria 'bodywork' (vehicle), carruagem 'carriage', carreto 'load', carrinha 'van', carro-de-mão 'wheelbarrow', carrossel 'carousel', charrete 'carriage, horsecart'.
- caixigo [m] 'oak; Portuguese oak', from *cassīcos, from Celtic *cassos 'curly, twisted', akin to Irish cas 'twist, turn, spin', Old Welsh cascord 'to twist'; cognate of Asturian caxigu, Aragonese caixico, Gascon casse, French chêne 'oak' (< *cassanos).
- centola, santola [m] 'European spider crab', akin to Gaulish personal name CINTULLOS 'the first one', from PCl *kintu- 'first'.
- cerveja [f] 'beer', from Vulgar Latin *cerevisia, from Gaulish Cognates: French cervoise, Provençal, Spanish cerveza; akin to Old Irish coirm, Welsh cwrw, Breton korev.
  derivatives: cervejaria[f] 'brewery, brasserie, beer hall', cervejeiro 'brewer'
- cheda[f] 'lateral external board of a cart, where the crossbars are affixed', via Medieval Latin cleta, from proto-Celtic *klētā-, cognate of Irish cloí (cloidhe) 'fence', clíath 'palisade, hurdle', Welsh clwyd 'barrier, wattle, scaffolding, gate', Cornish kloos 'fence', Breton kloued 'barrier, fence'; cognate of French claie 'rack, wattle fencing', Occitan cleda, Catalan cleda 'livestock pen', Basque gereta.
- choco [m] 'cowbell; squid', from proto-Celtic *klokko-, akin to Old Irish clocc, Welsh cloch, Breton kloc'h; cognate of Asturian llueca and llócara 'cowbell', French cloche 'bell', German Glock.
  derivatives: chocar 'to bang, to shock', chocalho 'cowbell', chocalhar [v] and chacoalhar [v] 'to shake smthg or someone, to insult someone'.
- cibalho [m] 'bird food' from Gaelic *cib- 'reed', akin to Irish 'cibeach'
- coelho [m] 'rabbit', likely from Celtiberian *cun-icos 'little dog' akin to Irish coinân, Cornish conyn, Manx coneeyn, Gaelic coineanach, Galician coello, Welsh cwningen, Catalan conill, Danish/Swedish/Norwegian kanin, Dutch konijn, Finnish kani, Frisian knyn, German Kanninchen, Icelandic kanína, Italian coniglio, Romansh cunigl, Spanish conejo, Veneto conéjo.
  derivatives: coelheira 'rabbit hutch', coelheiro '(dog) good at hunting rabbits', rabicoelha(ornithology) also rabiscoelha 'corncrake, spotted crake', coelhinha 'bunny'
- colmeia [m] 'beehive', from a Celtic form *kolmēnā 'made of straw', from * kŏlmos 'straw', which gave Leonese cuelmo; cf. Welsh calaf "reed, stalk", Cornish kalav "straw", Breton kolo "stalk").
  derivatives: colmeeiro 'hiver', colmeal 'beekeeping space, area'
- comba [f] 'valley, inflexion', from proto-Celtic *kumbā, cognate of North Italian comba, French combe, Occitan comba; akin to Irish com, Welsh cwm 'hollow (land form)', Cornish komm 'small valley, dingle', Breton komm 'small valley, deep water'.
- combo [m] (adj.) 'curved, bent', from Celtic *kumbo-, cognate of Provençal comb, Spanish combo.
  derivatives: combar 'to bend'.
- cômoro [m] also combro 'mound, hillock, limit of a patch or field, usually left intentionally unploughed', from proto-Celtic *kom-ɸare-(yo)-, cognate of Old Irish comair 'in front of', Welsh cyfair 'direction, place, spot, acre'. Or either to *kom-boros 'brought together'.
  derivatives: acomarar 'to mark out a field (literally to dote with cômoros)'.
- corno 'horn'(OIr corn, OB to PIE *k´er-IEW: 576 (cf. Lat. cornu pl. 'roe'). Although the word has been considered a loan from Latin, there is no reason to deny its Celtic origin (see: P. Sims-Williams, Degrees of Celticity in Ptolemy's Names, in Ptolemy, 9; PNPG, Celtic elements, s.v.).
- curral [m] 'corral, pen; corner', from Celtic *korro-, akin to Middle Irish cor 'circle, turn', corrán 'sickle', Welsh cor 'enclosure', Cornish kor 'turn, veering'.
- Deus [m] 'God' via Latin, 'deus' from Celtic *dēuo-, *dīuo- 'god' (cognate OIr día, MB dou, OC duy, Gl. deus, C. dev in LNN, OW in dúiútít 'divinity', CPNE: 82; EGOW: 51; GPC: 1101; LEIA D-64; PECA: 41). Well attested in Continental Celtic, cf. G. PNN Deo-gnata, diuuo-gna (GPN: 191–92; KGP: 190–91). Traditionally, to PIE *dhei-'shine' IEW: 183–87, LIV: 108 (Skt. deva-, Lat. deus, etc.). ACPN: 70–71; DLG: 142–43; PNPG, Celtic Elements, s.v.
- dorna [f] 'a type of boat; trough, measurement (volume)', from proto-Celtic *durno- 'fist', Irish dorn fish, Breton dorn 'hand'; Akin to Old French, Occitan dorn, 'a handful'. Nevertheless, the Asturian duerna 'bowl' demand a form **dorno-.
- embaixada [f] 'embassy', from Provençal ambaissada, from ambaissa 'service, duty', from proto-Celtic *ambactos 'servant', akin to Welsh amaeth 'farm', Cornish ammeth 'farming', Old Breton ambaith.
  derivatives: embaixador [m] 'ambassador', embaixatriz 'madam-ambassador'
- gabela, gavela [f] 'handful, faggot', from Proto-Celtic *gabalā or *gabaglā-, cognate of French javelle, Provençal gavela, Spanish gavilla; akin to Old Cornish gavael 'catch, capture', Irish gabháil 'get, take, grab, capture', gabhal 'fork'.
- galga [f] 'plain stone', from *gallikā, to Proto-Celtic *gallos 'stone', akin to Irish gall, French galet 'gravel' gallete 'plain cake'.
  derivatives: galgar [v] 'carving a stone to make it plain and regular'.
- gancho [n] ler|pt|cel-pro|*ganskyos||branch, twig, hook. derivatives: enganchar [v] to hook, to grab, to hook up, to clasp. From proto-Celtic *ganskyos.desenganchar [v] to unhook, to unclasp, to release, to free.
- gorar [v] 'sickness, rotting of an egg (hatching), to get confused (thought)', from Proto-Celtic *gʷor-, akin to Old Irish guirid, Welsh and Cornish gori 'to hatch (eggs)' and Breton goriñ.
  derivatives: goro 'unfertilized egg, failure, misfortune', gorado 'an egg which didn't hatch, a failed situation or unfortunate person'.
- jarrete [m] 'knee-cap, hock, hamstring' from Gaulish *garra 'leg', akin to Welsh 'garr', which is of uncertain origin; possibly sharing a common origin with Proto-Greek άκαρα 'leg, shank'
- lago [m] 'lake', Latinised 'lacus' from Celtic *locu-, *loco- 'lake' (OIr loch 'lake', OB in lohan gl., lochhaam gl. stagno, OW lichou gl. palu[de]s, luchauc, gl. paluster, Mod W llwch DGVB: 242; EGOW: 103; GPC: 2173; PECA: 72). According to E. Hamp in ZCP 46(1994), 12, independent loans from an unknown substratum language (as well as Lat. lacus, OE lagu, etc.; differently DLG: 206).
- lagoa [f] 'small lake, lagoon'. Latinised 'lacus' from Celtic *locu-, *loco- 'lake'
- landa [f], lande [f] 'uncultivated or sandy plot' from Proto-Celtic *landā, akin to Old Irish lann 'land, church', Welsh lann 'church lands', French lande 'sandy plot', Provençal and Catalan landa.
- lage [f] 'stone slab', from the medieval form lagena, from proto-Celtic *ɸlāgenā, cognate of Old Irish lágan, láigean, Welsh llain 'broad spearhead, blade'; akin to Irish láighe 'mattock, spade'.
- légua [f] 'league', to Proto-Celtic *leukā, cognate of French lieue, Spanish legua; akin to Old Irish líe (genitive líag) 'stone', Irish lia
- leira [f] 'plot, delimited and levelled field', from the medieval form laria, from proto-Celtic *ɸlār-yo-, akin to Old Irish làr 'ground, floor', Breton leur 'ground', Welsh llawr 'floor'.
  derivatives: leiro 'small, ou unleveled, plot', leirar 'land working', leiroto, leiria 'place of small plots, allotments'.
- lerca [f] 'skinny, malnourished cow or cattle in general, skinny woman', from proto-Celtic *wliskā 'stick', cognate of Old Irish flesc.
- lousa also loisa [f] 'flagstone', 'trap', from Proto-Celtic *laws-, cognate of Provençal lausa, Spanish losa, French losenge 'diamond'.
  derivatives: enlousar 'to cover with flagstones', lousado 'roof', lousão 'large flagstone', louseiro or loiseiro' 'stonemason', enlousar [v]'to cover with stones, to make a stone wall, to trap, to trick or fool someone'
- lota 'fish auction/market', Latinised borrowing 'lota' < Gaulish *lotta 'flat fish' akin to French lotte, Old Irish lethaid 'he extends, expands', Welsh lledu, llydan 'flounders' Cornish leyth 'flounder, flat-fish'.
- mar [m] 'sea' Latinised 'mare' from Celtic *mori- (OIr muir 'sea', OB mor in compounds, e.g. morgablou gl. aestuaria .i. per quae mare reciprocum tum accedit tum recedit, MB mor; OC mor gl. mare, C (in LNN) mor; OW mor (Liber Landavensis), and in mormeluet gl. testudinum, ModW mor CPNE: 168; DGVB: 259; EGOW: 115; GPC: 2485; LEIA: M-73; PECA: 80). The word is well attested in Continental Celtic, cf. G. more. gl.mare, morici gl. marini (Endlicher Glossary), Pliny's mori marusa (mare congelatum), G. PNN Mori-tasgus, Mori-rigis; see GPN: 232–33, KGP: 245. To PIE *mori- IEW: 748 (Lat. mare, Go. marei, OE mere, E mere). ACPN: 92–93; DLG: 229, PNPG, Celtic Elements, s.v.
- menino [m], menina [f] 'kid, child, baby', from medieval mennino, from proto-Celtic *menno-, akin to Old Irish menn 'kid (goat)', Irish meannán, Welsh myn, Breton menn.
  derivatives: meninice or meninez 'childhood, infancy, childishness', meninote 'nipper', [m].
- minhoca [f] 'earthworm', from medieval *milocca, from Proto-Celtic *mîlo-, akin to Asturian milu, merucu 'earthworm', Irish míol 'worm, maggot', Welsh, Breton mil 'animal'.
  Derivative: minhoquice 'unfounded suspicions, brooding on smthg unimportant'
- nau [f] 'ship, vessel' Latinised 'navis' from Celtic *nauo- (> navigability) (OIr nau 'ship', M(od)W noe vessel, bowl, platter' GPC: 2592; LEIA: N-5). Cf. Auson. (Epist. 22,1) nausum. To PIE *neh2u- 'boat' IEW: 755-56 (Skt. nau, Lat. navis 'ship', ON nór 'id.', etc.). DLG: 232, s.v. nauson; PNPG, Celtic Elements, s.v. nauo.
  derivatives: navegar [v] 'to sail', navegante, Navegador[m] 'sailor', 'Seafarer', nave(archaic) 'ship, boat', navio 'ship'.
- olga [f], 'small farming land, plain between hills', from Proto-Celtic *ɸolkā, cognate of French ouche and Provençal olca.
- peça [f] 'piece', from Vulgar Latin *pettia, from Gaulish petsi, from proto-Celtic *kʷezdi, cognate of Italian pezza, French pièce, Spanish pieza; akin to Old Irish cuit (Irish cuid) 'piece, share, part', Welsh peth 'thing', Breton pez.
  derivatives: pedaço, pedacinho, pedação[m] 'piece, little piece, big piece'- ** uncertain whether from Lat.pittacĭu < Gr. pittákion or Proto-Celtic *pettia 'piece'.
- pequeno 'small, kid', from Gaelic *bec-, becan-, beag, beagan- 'small'.
  derivatives: pequerrucho[m], pequerruchichinho 'little one', pequenagem, pequenez 'small thing, infancy', pequenino, pequenote, pequeninote pequenininho 'small child, small thing or object', empequenecer [v], empequenitar 'to make small, to make someone feel small', pequenada, pequerruchada 'a group of small children'.
- pitada [f] 'pinch, handful' from Celtic *pit-, pet-, cuid-, cuit-, coda- 'piece'.
  derivatives: petar [v] 'to break in small pieces, to tell lies', petiscar [v] 'to knible, to snack, to eat delicacies, to touch slightly, to have a vague knowledge about something or someone', petisco [m] 'delicacy, speciality dish, small bites, snack', petisqueira, petiscaria 'snack-bar, restaurant specialising in local dishes', petanisco 'poking stick', pitéu 'delicacy (food)', petiz 'child, kid', petizada 'kids, children', carrapito 'bob (hair), midget (derogatory)', carapeto 'wild pear', carapeteiro 'wild pear tree, liar', carrapeta, carapeta 'small pion, short person', peta 'white lie'.
- piteira 'drunkenness (colloquial), agave plant, ballast (fishing), debt, default, cigarette holder, cut or blow in the head' from Celtic *pett, pitt- 'small'.
- rego [m], 'furrow, ditch', from proto-Celtic *ɸrikā, akin to Welsh rhych, Breton reg, Scottish/Irish riach 'trace left from something'; cognate of French raie, Occitan, Catalan rega, Basque erreka, Italian riga 'wrinkle'.
  derivatives: regueira 'small water canal', regato 'stream, gully, glen', regatear [v] 'to haggle, to bargain', regateio 'quibble', regateável 'arguable (price)', regateiro 'person who haggles, presumptuous'
- rodovalho [m], 'hefty, short man (with a beard), 'pleuronectidae type of fish (round and flat in shape)' from Celtic *roto-ball-jo- [m], da forma composta celta *roto-ball-jo-, meaning 'round edges', akin to Irish roth 'wheel', Welsh rhod, and Breton rod combined with Irish ball 'member, organ'.
- saiote [m] 'peticoat, under-skirt' and saia [f] 'skirt', from the medieval form sagia, from an ancient Celtic form from which also Latin sagum 'robe', Greek ságos from Gaulish *sagos- 'coat', fr *seg- 'to hold on or together'.
- seara [f] also senra(archaic), sown field recently broken up, but which is left fallow', from a medieval form senara, a Celtic compound of *seni- 'apart, separated' (cf. Old Irish sain 'alone', Welsh han 'other') and *aro- 'ploughed field'. (cf. Welsh âr, Irish ár 'ploughed field').
  derivatives: seareiro 'cereals farmer, small farmer'
- tasca [f] and tasquinha [m], 'swingle', related to Galatian taskós 'peg, stake'.
- tola [f] furrow from Proto-Celtic *tullo- 'pierced, pricked' [m / f], akin to Irish toll 'hole, hollow', Welsh twll 'hole', Breton toull 'hole'; Catalan toll and Old French tolon 'hill'.
- toleima, tolémia [f], 'foolishness' from ancient Celtic *TULLESMENA (empty, devoid of brains)
- tona [f] 'skin, bark, scum of milk, surface of any liquid', from proto-Celtic *tondā, cognate of Old Irish tonn, Welsh tonn.
  derivatives: toneira 'pot for obtaining butter from the milk', tonel 'wine barrel' cognate of Old French tonel, French tonneau 'barrel, cask'.
- tojo [m], 'gorse, furze (Ulex europaeus)', from Celtic *togi-, akin to Spanish/Gascon toja, French dialectal tuie.
  derivatives: fura-tojos 'marten'; tojal, tojeira 'place with tojos'.
- touça, toiça [f], 'young wood, shrub' from ancient Celtic *TOUTIA < *TEUTIĀ (tribal, communal property)
- toucinho [m], also toicinho 'bacon, lard, pork rash' via Latin 'tuccinum (lardum)', from Celtic tucca 'buttery juice'.
  derivatives: toucinheiro, toicinheiro 'lard seller, butcher', toucinho-do-céu 'Portuguese regional sweet made with almonds and egg yolk'
- trado [m] 'auger', from Proto-Celtic *taratro-, cognate of Irish tarathar, Welsh taradr, Breton tarar, Occitan taraire, Catalan taradre, Spanish taladro, French tarière, Romansch tarader.
  derivatives: tradar, tradear 'to drill'.
- tranca [f], tranco [m] 'beam, pole, penis', from proto-Celtic *tarankā, tarinca, cognate of Spanish tranca 'club, cudgel', French taranche 'screw bar, ratchet (wine press)', Provençal tarenco; akin to OIr tairinge 'iron nail, tine', Ir tairne 'metal nail, Sc tairnge 'nail'.
  derivatives: trancar[v] 'to close, lock or block', destrancar [v] 'to open, unlock or unblock smthg. or someone', trancada 'to hit someone or smthg. with a bat, copulation', trancaria 'pile of wood logs', destrancador 'opener', trança '(hair) brade', entrantrançado 'weaved', tranqueta 'lock, latch, bolt'.
- trevo [m] 'clover', from Proto-Celtic *trebno- farm house, homestead, akin to Irish treb, Cornish tre, Welsh tref, Asturian truébanu, French trèfle, Spanish trébol and Catalan trèvol.
- trengo [m] 'silly, nitwit, little brat, idiot', from Celtic *trenco 'short, small'.
- trincar [v] 'to bite, to snap', possible Latin loanword *trinicāre- (cut into three pieces) from Gaulish *trincare, trancare-to cut (the head), cognate of old Provençal trencar, Catalan trencar, French trancher.
  derivatives: tranche 'slice', retrincar, retrinco 'to chew, to cut into smaller pieces', 'patch of a bigger piece', trinco [m] 'latch, lock, bolt', trinca, trincadela, 'bite, knibble, small cut' from Gaulish, possibly from Proto-Celtic *trenco- 'small piece'.
- trincha [f] 'brush, roller, wood carving knife or chisel', from Celtic *trenco 'short, small'.
- truta [f] 'trout', from Celtic *tructa- freshwater fish of the salmon family. Cognate of French truite, English trout, Catalan truita, Spanish trucha, Italian trota.
- varga [f] 'hut; wall made of hurdles; hurdle, fence', from Celtic *wraga, French barge, akin to Old Irish fraig, Irish fraigh 'braided wall, roof, pen', Br gwrac'hell 'haybale, rick of hay'.
- vasculho [m] 'bundle of straw; broom', from proto-Celtic *baski- 'bundle', cognate of Gascon bascojo 'basket', Asturian bascayu 'broom', Breton bec'h 'bundle, load'.
- vassalo [m] from Vulgar Latin vassalus, from proto-Celtic *wasso- or *wasto- 'young man, squire', cognate of French vassal, Spanish vasallo, Middle Irish foss 'servant', Welsh gwas 'servant; lad', Breton gwaz.
  derivatives: avassalar [v] 'to overwhelm, to stagger, to overpower', avassalador [m], avassalante [n] 'overwhelming'
- vassoura [f] or vassoira [f] 'broom' from Proto-Celtic *basca- or *baski- 'bind, tangle', via Gaulish bascauda, akin to French bâche 'canvas sheet, tarpaulin' Gascon bascojo 'hanging basket', Asturian bascayu, Béarn bascoyes, Welsh basg 'plaiting', Middle Irish basc 'neckband'.
  derivatives: vassoirar [v] or vassourar [v] 'to sweep with a broom', vassourada or vassoirada 'broom sweep, broomstick strike/hit'
- vereda [f] 'main road', from the medieval form vereda, from Celtic *uɸo-rēdo-, 'pathway'; akin to Welsh gorwydd 'steed', Vulgar Latin veredus 'horse', French palefroi 'steed' (< *para-veredus).
  derivatives: enveredar[v] 'to take or chose a path or direction in life or profession'
- vidoeiro [m] (alternative, archaic spellings bidoeiro [m] or bidoeira [f] 'birch', from Celtic *betu- or *betū-, cognate of Catalan beç, Occitan bèç (< bettiu), French bouleau, Italian betulla (< betula); akin to Irish beith, Welsh bedw, Breton bezv.
  derivatives: vidoeiral 'place with birch-trees'.

== Germanic languages ==
The main Germanic influence in Portuguese were the Suebi and Visigoths (also Buri and Vandals).

Their vocabulary in Portuguese is often related to warfare/military topics, animals texugo (badger), natural world orvalho (dew), Human qualities like franqueza (frankness, candour), orgulho (pride), some verbs like ganhar (to gain), town and placenames such as Aldão, Alderete, Albergaria-a-Velha, Albergaria-a-Nova (from Gothic 'haribergo'), Ermesinde and Esposende, where sinde and sende for instance; are derived from the Germanic "sinths" (military expedition), numerous Suebi derivations like, Freamunde (from 'Fredemundus'), Vermunde, Amonde (Onomondi), Samonde, Gimonde, Aldão, Guadramil, Gondomil, Samil, Gosende, Guilhofrei (from Geodefredis), Esmoriz, Esmeriz (toponymics of Hermeric, king of the Suebians), Alhariz (toponymic of Aliaricus), Oriz, Touriz, Roriz, Gavieira, Gondoriz, Gondizalves, Gondar, Gondomar (from Gundomarus), Gondarém, Gudim, Guimarães (from Vimara), Torres Vedras (from Turres Veteras, 'old tower'), Sousa, Terras de Sousa and Terras de Bouro (land of the Buri), Serra do Bouro, Bouro, are found mainly in the Minho (Braga) and Douro (Porto) regions- these two provinces present the highest concentration of Germanic toponyms in the Iberian Peninsula, as they historically correspond to old the Suebic Kingdom in the middle-ages.

Maps about the King Rechila of the Suebi conquests (438–448).

Many of the Germanic words entered the language during the late antiquity, either as words introduced into Vulgar Latin elsewhere, or as words brought along by the Suebi who settled in Gallaecia (Northern Portugal and Galicia) in the 5th century, and also by the Visigoths who annexed the Suebic Kingdom in 585 and ruled until the 8th century AD.

It is very difficult to establish how the Suebi and Visigoth dialects differed from each other during that period, how much linguistic assimilation occurred, and therefore almost impossible to classify words with etymological certainty.

Some scholars have proposed that the name Thervingi-Goths may have pre-Pontic, Scandinavian, origins. Wolfram cites the example of J. Svennung who believed that the Tervingi were Scandinavian "ox people".

The Suebi are believed to have originated east of the Elbe River, in Germany. They were composed of different tribes who spoke different Germanic dialects. The Marcomanni and Quadi being the most relevant Suebians in what is today Portugal and Galicia.

=== List of Portuguese words of Germanic origin ===
Because they have different Germanic origins, this list is divided into words that come from English, Frankish, Langobardic, Middle Dutch, Middle High German, Middle Low German, Old English, Old High German, Old Norse, Old Swedish, and Visigothic and finally, words which come from a Germanic root, where the specific source is unknown or uncertain. Projections indicate over 600 Germanic words in Portuguese, with a tendency to increase due to English, German and other modern influences. Some of these words existed in Latin as loanwords from other languages. Some of these words have alternate etymologies and may also appear on a list of Galician words from a different language. Some words contain non-Germanic elements. Any form with an asterisk (*) is unattested and therefore hypothetical.

==== from Frankish ====
- estandarte= a military standard: from Old French estandart, probably from Frankish (*)standhard "standard that marks a meeting place", (implicit sense: "that which stands firmly"), from (*)standan "to stand", (from Germanic (*)standan, from the IE root (*)sta- "to stand") + (*)hard "hard, firm", see ardid below in Germanic section.
- forro= lining(garment), liner, ceiling(house) from Frankish fôdare
- forrar(v)= to cover, to insulate, to wallpaper, to line, to sheathe
- desforra= vindication, revenge, revanche
- ginja= sweet cherry from Frankish *wihsila-
- guante= glove, gauntlet: from Frankish (*)want "gauntlet."
- megengra(o), muzengro, majangro= titmouse (bird), from Frankish meisinga, this in turn related to Celtic meann, menn(small).
- tasca= tavern, inn: from Frankish *taska

==== from Norwegian ====
- slalom= slalom (from the Morgedal/Seljord dialect of Norwegian 'slalåm': "sla," meaning slightly inclining hillside, and "låm," meaning track after skis

Langobardic:

- rufia, rufião= ruffian, thug, bully: from Langobardic *hruf

==== from Middle Dutch ====
- rumo= direction, course, route, pomp, ostentation: from Old Spanish rumbo "each of the 32 points on a compass", from Middle Dutch rume "space, place, rhumb line, storeroom of a ship", from Germanic rūmaz "space, place", from the IE root (*)reu- "space, to open".

==== from Middle High German ====
- estroina= fast liver, bohemian, spend-thrifty, reveller, vagabond: from Mid. High Ger. *striunen- or Old Eng. *strēon-
- estroinice= pleasure seeker's, bohemian conduct or behaviour: from Mid. High Ger. *striunen- or Old Eng. *strēon-
- estroinar (v)= living the high-life, to live beyond one's means: from Mid. High Ger. *striunen- or Old Eng. *strēon-

==== from Old English ====
- arlequim= harlequin: from Italian arlecchino, from Old French Herlequin "mythic chief of a tribe", probably from Middle English Herle king, from Old English Herla cyning, Herla Kyning literally King Herla, a king of Germanic mythology identified with Odin/Woden. Cyning "king" is from Germanic (*)kunjan "family" (hence, by extension royal family), from the IE root (*)gen- "to birth, regenerate".
- bote= a small, uncovered boat: from Old French bot, from Middle English bot, boot, from Old English bāt, from Germanic (*)bait-, from the IE root (*)bheid- "to split".
- caneco= jug: from Old English *canne < from Proto-Germanic kunnan/kanna
- caneca= mug: *see above
- este= east: from French est, from Middle English est, from Old English ēast, from Germanic (*)aust-, from the IE root (*)awes-, aus "to shine".
- norte= north: from Old French nord, from Old English north, from Germanic (*)north-, from the IE root (*)nr-to "north", from (*)nr- "wikt:under, to the left"
- oeste= west: from Middle English west, from Old English west, from Germanic (*)west-, from (*)wes-to-, from (*)wes-, from (*)wespero- "evening, dusk"
- sul= south (combining form): from Old French sud "south", from Old English sūth, from Germanic (*)sunthaz, from the IE root (*)sun-, swen-, variants of (*)sāwel- "sun"

==== from Old Norse ====
- bife= steak, beefsteak: from English beefsteak, from beef (ultimately from Latin bōs, bovis "cow", from the IE root (*)gwou- "ox, bull, cow") + steak, from Middle English steyke, from Old Norse steik "piece of meat cooked on a spit", from Germanic (*)stik-, see estaca below in the Germanic section.
- guindar [v]= to lift, to be pretentious from (Old) French guinder from Old Norse vinda 'to toss'
- guinda= hoisting rope from Old Norse vinda
- guindaste= crane, winch via French guindeau < Old French guindas, from Old Norse vindáss
- vaga= wave possibly from Old Norse vagr or Gothic vega from Germanic vigan akin to French 'vague'

==== from Old Swedish ====
- dinamite= dynamite, compound word by Swedish inventor and chemist Alfred Nobel
- rena= reindeer, from Old Swe. 'ren'
- tungsténio= tungsten, from Old Swe. 'tung' (heavy) and 'sten' (stone)
- tungsténico= relative to tungsten

==== from Gothic, Suebian ====
- Aguerridamente (fiercely, bravely) from Gothic wirro
- Aguerrido (fierce, courageous, fighter) from Gothic wirro
- Aguerrir [v], Aguerreirar [v] (to fight, to combat, to challenge without fear) from Gothic wirro
- albergar[v] (to host or shelter someone) from Gothic haribergo
- albergue (hostel, youth hostel) from Gothic haribergo
- aleive (treason, traitor) from Gothic lavjan
- aleivosia (treason, deception) from Gothic lavjan
- aleivoso (person/act of a treacherous nature, traitor) from Gothic lavjan
- ardil= (trap, trick, conspiracy) from Gothic 𐌷𐌰𐍂𐌳𐌿𐍃 (hardus) 'hard' or Frankish ardjan
- ardiloso= (cunning, deceptive, tricky) from Gothic 𐌷𐌰𐍂𐌳𐌿𐍃 (hardus) 'hard' or Frankish ardjan
- aringa (military camp) from Gothic hrings
- Atreguar[v] (to discuss/negotiate conditions of a truce) from Gothic trigivo
- Banca (banks, banking system, bench) from Gothic banka
- Bancário (bank, banker)from Gothic banka
- Banco (bank, bench) from Gothic banka
- Banqueiro (banker, financier) from Gothic banka
- Brasa from Gothic *bras, brasa
- Brasalisco from Gothic *bras, brasa
- Brasão from Gothic *bras, brasa
- Braseiro from Gothic *bras, brasa
- Brasido from Gothic *bras, brasa
- Brasil (Brazil) from Gothic *bras, brasa
- Brasonado from Gothic *bras, brasa
- Destacar[v] (to assign troops, to stand out, to surpass) from Gothic stakka
- Destaque (surpass, highlight) from Gothic stakka
- duende= elf, gnome, from *tomt akin to Swedish 'tomten'
- Elmo from Gothic hilms
- Escanção (sommelier) from Gothic skankja
- Escançar[v], Escancear[v], Escanchar[v] (to measure and serve wine) from Gothic skankja
- Espora (spur) from Gothic spaúra
- Esporão (spur) from Gothic spaúra
- Estaca (stake) from Gothic stakka
- Estacada (stockade) from Gothic stakka
- Estacar[v] (to stake) from Gothic stakka
- Fona from Gothic fon
- Fornir[v] from Gothic frumjan
- Godo/Gótico from Gothic guthans
- Guerra, Guerreio (war, conflict) from Gothic wirro
- Guerreão (troublemaker, ruffian) from Gothic wirro
- Guerrear[v] (to fight) from Gothic wirro
- Guerreiro (warrior, fighter) from Gothic wirro
- Guerrilha (guerrilla) from Gothic wirro
- Guia (guide) from Gothic wida
- Guiar[v] (to guide, to lead, to drive a vehicle) from Gothic wida
- Intrabancário (interbanking (system), interbank) from Gothic banka
- Lasca (chip, splinter) from Gothic laska
- Lascar[v] (to cleave, to flake smthg off, to chip smthg) from Gothic laska
- Lascarino or Lascarinho (joker, troublemaker, petty thief) from Gothic laska
- Marta from Gothic marthus
- Multibanco (Cash dispenser, ATM) from Gothic banka
- Roca from Gothic ruka
- Tampa from Gothic tappa
- Tascar[v] from Gothic taskon
- Texugo or Teixugo (badger) from Gothic *thahsuks, shortening of *thahsus-
- Trégua (truce) from Gothic trigivo
- Triscar[v] from Gothic thriskan
- Ufa from Gothic ufjo
- Ufanear[v] or Ufanar[v] (to glorify, to praise) from Gothic ufjo
- Ufano (glorious, vain) from Gothic ufjo
- Vaga (wave) from Gothic vega < vigan

==== from Germanic languages ====
- abandonar (v)= to abandon: from Old French a bandon, from a + bandon "control" from ban "proclamation, jurisdiction, power", from Germanic (*)banwan, (*)bannan "to proclaim, speak publicly"
- Aguardar[v] (to wait i.e. at a queue) from Germanic wardaz, Visigothic wardjan Gothic wer
- alemão= of Germany (adjective), the German language: from Late Latin Alemanni, an ancient Germanic tribe, from Germanic (*)alamanniz (represented in Gothic alamans), from ala- "all" + mannis, plural of manna-/mannaz "man" (Gothic manna) from the IE root (*)man- "man"
- Barão, Baronesa (baron, baroness) from Germanic baro
- bóia= a buoy: probably from Old French boie, from Germanic, possibly from Old High German bouhhan, from Germanic (*)baukna- "signal", from the IE root (*)bha- "to shine"
- Branca (female name, white female) from Germanic blanka
- Branco (common Portuguese surname) from Germanic blank
- Branco (white, pale) from Germanic blank
- branco= white, white person, blank: from Vulgar Latin (*)blancus, from Germanic (*)blank- "to shine", from the IE root.
- Brancura (whiteness) from Germanic blank
- Branqueio (to bleach, to whiten or launder smthg i.e. money laundering) from Germanic blank
- Branquela (pejorative for White person) from Germanic blank
- Branquicento (of faded, pale appearance) from Germanic blank
- brincadeira= joyful play, joke, prank from Proto-Germanic *blīkaną/blinkaną.
- brincar= to play from Proto-Germanic *blīkaną/blinkaną.
- brinquedo= toy from Proto-Germanic *blīkaną/blinkaną.
- churrasco, churrasqueira, churrascaria, churrascar[v]= from Suebian/Gothic SAURUS
- Escarnecedor, from Germanic skernjan
- Escarnicação, from Germanic skernjan
- Escarniçador, etc. from Germanic skernjan
- Escarniçar[v] (to mock, to show contempt for someone or a situation) from Germanic skernjan
- Escarninhamente, from Germanic skernjan
- Escarninho, from Germanic skernjan
- Escárnio, from Germanic skernjan
- Escarnir[v] *Escarniçar[v] (to mock, to show contempt for someone or a situation) from Germanic skernjan
- estaca= a stake: from Germanic (*)stak-, from the IE root (*)steg- "pale, post pointed stick".
- Ganhar[v] (to gain) from Germanic waidanjan
- Ganho (gain, profit) from Germanic waidanjan
- Gavião (hawk) from Germanic gabilans
- Guarda (guard, warden, police) from Germanic wardaz, Visigothic wardjan, Suebian wardon Gothic wer
- Guardar[v] (to guard, to safekeep, to protect) from Germanic wardaz, Visigothic wardjan Gothic wer
- guardar= to guard, watch over, keep, observe (a custom): from Germanic (*)wardōn "to look after, take care of", from the IE root (*)wor-to-, "to watch", from (*)wor-, (*)wer- "to see, watch, perceive"
- Guardião (guard, legal guardian) from Germanic wardaz, Visigothic wardjan Gothic wer
- Resguardar[v] (to shelter, to cover, to protect smthg or someone i.e. from the elements) from Germanic wardaz, Visigothic wardjan, Suebian wardon Gothic wer
- Roubador (robber, thief) from Germanic raubon
- Roubalheira (robbery, theft) from Germanic raubon
- Roubar[v] (to rob) from Germanic raubon
- Roubo (robbery) from Germanic raubon
- sopa = soup,
- venda= blindfold: from Proto-Germanic * bǐnda-

==== Others ====
===== A =====
- abandonar; abandono= "to abandon"; "abandon"
- atacar= "to attack"
- abordar= "to attack (a problem)"

=== Germanic Names ===
Ancient Roman-derived names are the most numerous in Portugal and Portuguese-speaking countries. Together with Germanic-derived names they constitute the majority of those (and similarly to most European/Western countries inherited also a number of ancient Greek and Hebrew names) today. With globalisation, a number of new Germanic names (and other origins) exist in Portuguese. Because they stem from the same root, Portuguese and Galician share common Germanic names, inherited from the Suevi (who settled in northern Portugal and Galicia in 409 AD), Visigoths, Vandals, Buri and other Germanic peoples, were often the most common Portuguese-Galician names during the early and high Middle Ages. This article deals with Germanic personal names recorded and used in northern Portugal, Galicia and its adjoining regions: territories of the kingdom of the Suebi during the early Middle Ages from its 409 settlement to the 12th century.

"(...) Igitur dum inter nos intemptio uertitur ad diuidendum mancipia de parentorum nostrorum Guntine et Rosule de neptos senatoris Siserici et Esmorice et de suos iermanos. Ideo que euenit in portione de filios Gunterodis, id est: Argiuitus, Gentibus, Tratiuigia, Recedrudi, Gaudiosus, Tequelo, Iulia, filios Stanildi, Sitiuidis, Gluscudilum, Framildi, Ruderigus, Sonobrida, Sabarigis, Argeleuba, Ostosia, Guntedrudia, Uitiza et Leuba, Guntildi, Iulia, Ragesindus, Sanildi cum sua filia Ermegundia, Seniorina, Uisteuerga, Sisulfus, Branderigus, Astruildi (...)"

Germanic and Latin names in a 10th-century Galician document.

== Germanic names ==
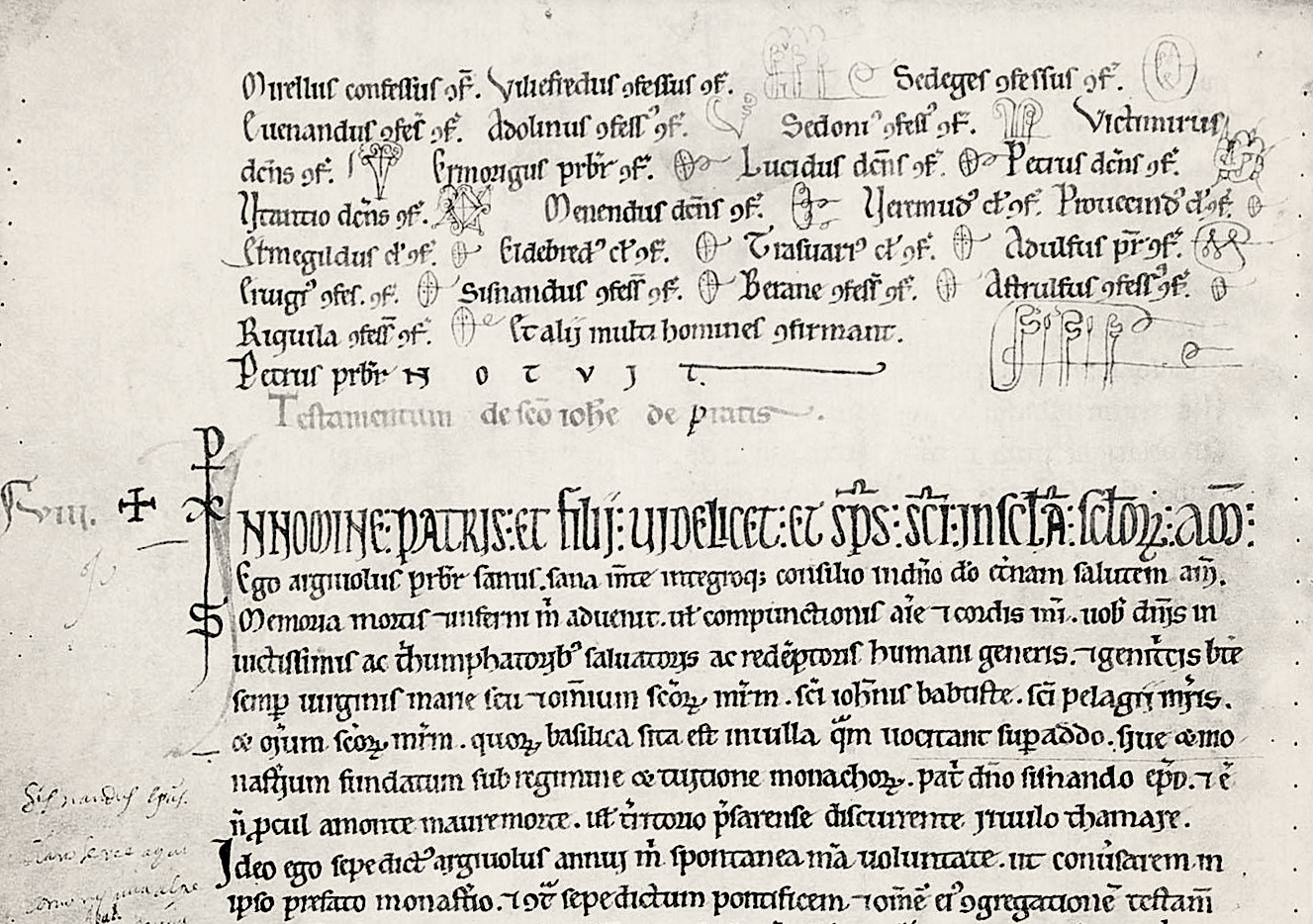
Germanic personal names in a 961 Galician document: Mirellus, Viliefredus, Sedeges, Evenandus, Adolinus, Sedoni, Victimirus, Ermoygus and others, with some Latin and Christian names

Germanic names were the most common personal names in Portugal-Galicia (Gallaecia) during the early and high Middle Ages, surpassing Christian and Roman names in number and popularity. The names, primarily of East Germanic origin, were used by the Suebi, Goths, Vandals and Burgundians. With the names, the Galicians-Portuguese inherited the Germanic onomastic system; a person used one name (sometimes a nickname or alias), with no surname, occasionally adding a patronymic. More than 1,000 such names have been preserved in local records. and in local toponyms.

Many of the Germanic names were composite, with the second element usually a noun with the same gender of the bearer. Others were hypocorisms formed from a composite name or deriving from it. Less frequently, a name was a noun or an adjective.

These names were transmitted to the Suevi with the usual Germanic rules of inheritance, which were variations (passing one element of the name; Rechiar was the son of Rechila, who was the son of Hermeric) and alliteration (names beginning with the same sound; Maldras was the son of the nobleman Masila). Full names were later transmitted from grandfather to grandson (commemoration), following a trend common until the present in most of western Europe.

=== Adaptations ===
In addition to the conversion of many Germanic endings into Romance or Latin endings, the names had phonetic adaptations such as the change of word stress from the first to the penultimate syllable, the conversion of most [þ] into [t] or [d] and the conversion of [h] into [k] before a consonant. [W] was initially preserved, although noted as [u] or [oy] before becoming [gw] (or, less commonly, [b]). These early inherited names underwent Western Romance and Galician changes from Latin, such as consonant lenition and palatalization. This contributed to a large number of variants in recorded names; Ostrofredus was recorded in Portugal-Galicia as Ortofredus, Ostofredo, Ostouredus, Ostrofedone, Stobredo and Strofredo.

== Names used by the Suevi ==
The following names, used by the Suevi of Gallaecia during the fifth and sixth centuries, were recorded in chronicles, inscriptions and acts of local ecclesiastical councils: Hermericus, Heremigarius, Rechila, Rechiarius, Agriulfum, Maldras, Massila, Framta, Frumarius, Rechimundus, Remismundus, Veremundus, Chararici, Ariamirus, Ildericus, Theudomirus, Miro, Nitigisius, Uittimer, Anila, Remisol, Adoric, Eboricus, Siseguntia f, Audeca, Malaricus, Pantardus, Neufila, Hildemirus, Commundus, Ermaricus, Sunila, Becilla, Gardingus, Argiovitus, Gomedei, Rodomiro, Ermengontia f, Remisiwera f, Thuresmuda f, Suinthiliuba f.

Many of the names, used by kings such as Miro, Reckila and Theudemirus, were used for local toponyms: Mirón, Requián, Requiás, Requiás and Receá, Tuimil and Toimil.

== Roots ==
The following is a list of the roots used to form Germanic personal names in Galicia-Portugal and northwestern Iberia. Many are related to war, victory, fame, boldness, strength and warlike qualities (bald-, funs-, hild-, gund-, nand-, rod-, seg-, send-), totemic animals (ar-, wulf-, ber-, ebur-) and weapons (brand-, bruni-, rand-, saru-); many others refer to knowledge, love and other peaceful qualities (fred-, leob-, mun-, ragi-, rad-, uin-). Some refer to the condition of ruler or master (fro-, ric-, vald-, Froya, Theodinus, Tructinus, Hendinus). Another group refers to the tribe, nation or country (conia-, fulc-, teod-, leod-, man-, truct-, gavi-, gogi-, kend-), and another appears to refer to Huns (Hun-), Suevi (Sav-), Goths (Gut-), Vandals (Vandal-), Celts (Vala-), Vendians/Slavs (Venet-), Galindians/Balths (Galind-), Franks (Frank-), Saxons (Sax-), Angles (Engl-), Danes (Dan-) and other peoples. Although some elements are identical to others found in Celtic anthroponymy (And-, Dag-, -mar, -riks), others appear to be adaptations of Latin words and names incorporated in the Danube region: Florens, Fortis, Crescens.

Forms marked with an asterisk are unrecorded and hypothetical. PGmc is an abbreviation for Proto-Germanic.

- ab-, to PGmc *abōn "man": Abbelinus
- abr-, to PGmc *abraz "huge, strong": Abragasia, Abrecan, Abronilli
- ad- (later a-), to PGmc *haþuz "battle, fight": Adefonsus, Adegundia, Adeqisio, Aderedus, Aderico, Adesindus, Adica, Adiero, Adarius, Adila, Adileobo, Adileova, Adimirus, Adolinus, Adosinda
- adal-, to PGmc *aþalaz "noble": Adala, Addalinus, Adegaster, Adelasindo, Atalamondo
- agi-, egi- (later ei-), to PGmc *agez "fear" or *agjō "edge": Agimadus, Agio, Agiulfus, Aidio, Egeredus, Egica, Egila, Agila, Egildus, Agildus, Egilo, Ailo, Eigonza, Eileuva, Eilleus, Eimirus, Eindu, Eirigu, Eisindus, Haginus
- agr- possibly to PGmc *akraz "field, open land": Agrivulfum, Agromirus
- aist-, to PGmc *aistēn "to give reverence": Aistando
- ala-, to PGmc *ala "all, wholly": Alaguntia, Alamiro, Alaricus, Alarius, Alatrudia, Alobrida, Aloindo, Aloitus, Alvarus
- alb-, to PGmc *albaz "elf": Albiaster, Alvaricus, Alvatus
- ald-, to PGmc *aldaz "old": Aldemirus, Aldereto, Aldericus, Aldia, Aldinus
- aldr-, to Proto-Germani *aldran "age, life": Aldras, Aldroitus
- ali-, to PGmc *aljaz "other": Alia, Alio, Aliaricus, Alifreda, Aliulfus, Aliverga, Alivergo, Aliverko, Aliverta, Alivertus, Alliefredus
- am-, eim-, em-, en-, to PGmc *haimaz "dear": Amingus, Eimoricus, Emila, Emilo, Emiso, Enaredus, Engildus, Entrudi
- amal-, to PGmc *amal- "valiant, brave": Amalilli
- amed-, to PGmc *amitaz "continuous": Amedon, Amedeiro
- an-, to PGmc *an- "forefather": Anagildus, Analsus, Anila, Anilo, Anualdus, Anulfo
- and-, ant-, to PGmc *anda "throughout": Andeatus, Andericus, Andiarius, Andifonso, Andila, Andilevo, Andilo, Anditio, Ando, Andosindus, Andulfus, Antemirus
- ans-, to PGmc *ansuz "god": Ansedeus, Ansemarus, Ansemirus, Ansemondus, Anseredo, Ansericus, Ansetrudia, Ansila, Ansileova, Ansilo, Ansiulphus, Ansiunda, Ansobrida, Ansoi, Anson, Ansuallo, Ansuario, Ansueto, Ansuildi, Ansvertus
- aquis-, to PGmc *akwesiz "axe": Aquisilde
- ar-, to PGmc *arnōn "eagle" or *arwaz "swift, ready": Aragunti, Arosinda, Arosindus, Arualdus, Aruildi, Arumundo
- ard-, to PGmc *harduz "hard" or *arduz "land": Ardabastus, Ardericus, Ardaldus, Ardesendus, Ardilo, Ardulfus, Artemiro, Erdebredo
- ari-, argi-, to PGmc *harjaz "army": Arebuldo, Argeberto, Argefonsus, Argemirus, Argemondo, Argenilli, Argeredus, Argericus, Argesindus, Argeva, Argevadus, Argevitus, Argifonsa, Argifredus, Argileuva, Argilo, Argioi, Argiuolus, Argivastro, Ariulfus
- aria-, to PGmc arjaz "noble": Arias, Ariastre
- arn-, to PGmc *arnuz "eagle": Arnadius, Arnaldus, Arnulfo
- asc-, to PGmc *askaz "ash-tree": Ascarigus, Ascarius, Asculfo
- ase-, to PGmc *haswaz "grey": Asemondus, Asileva, Asinoy, Asiulfus, Asofuda, Asoi, Asoredus
- asp-, to PGmc *aspōn "aspen": Asparigus
- ast-, to PGmc *astaz "branch" or *austaz "east": Astaguerra, Asterigo, Astileuva, Astredo, Astualdu, Astulfus
- astr-, ostr-, obstr-, stor-, to PGmc *austraz "east": Astragis, Astragundia, Astramondus, Astratus, Astremarus, Astriverga, Astrogoto, Astruara, Astruario, Astruedu, Astruildi, Astrulfus, Obstrisinda, Ostamalus, Ostosia, Ostrofreda, Ostrofredo, Ostromirus, Astromirus, Estromirus, Storesindo
- at- (later ad-) to PGmc *haþuz "war": Ataulfus, Atarius, Atericus, Aton
- atan-, tan-, to PGmc *aþnaz "year": Atanagildus, Atanaricus, Atanus, Tanina, Tanino, Atanitus, Tano, Tanoi, Tenildi
- att-, to PGmc *attōn "father": Atauldus, Attan, Attila, Attina
- aud-, od-, to PGmc *audaz "wealth": Audeca, Audesinda, Audila, Audinus, Audibertus, Audofredo, Audugus, Ausendus, Oda, Odemundus, Odamirus, Odericus, Odisclus, Odorica, Odoynus, Oduarius, Otualdo
- aur-, or-, to PGmc *auraz "sand, sea": Auresindus, Aurilli, Orosinda
- aus-, os-, to PGmc *aus- "shining": Osoarius, Osobredus, Osmundo, Osoredo, Osorico, Ausarigus, Osoy, Ossila, Ozandus
- bad- (later ba-), to PGmc *badwō "battle": Badamundus, Bademirus, Badila, Badosindus
- bait-, to PGmc *baitaz "ship, boat": Baitus
- bald-, balt-, to PGmc *balþaz "bold": Baldemarius, Baldemirus, Balderedo, Balderico, Baldesindo, Baldila, Baldoi, Baldoigius, Baltarius, Baltino, Balto
- bar-, to PGmc *baraz "man": Barilli, Barsilli, Baron, Baroncellus, Baronza, Barvaldus
- bat-, to PGmc *bataz "good": Bati, Batinus, Baton
- baud-, to PGmc *baudiz "ruler": Baudemirus, Baudesindus
- baz-, to PGmc *bazaz "naked": Bazarius
- beg-, bag-, bec-, bac-, to PGmc *bēgaz "contest, quarrel": Baga, Bega, Becilla, Bagesindus, Becosindo, Bagina, Bagino, Baquina, Baquino, Begica, Pegito
- ber-, to PGmc *berōn "bear": Bera, Bergundi, Berila, Berildi, Berosildi, Berilo, Berina, Berinus, Beroi, Berosindus, Berulfus
- berg-, verg-, to PGmc *bergaz "shelter": Bergas, Bergila, Vergilli, Vergina, Virgia
- bern-, to PGmc *bernuz "bear": Bernaldus
- bert-, vert-, to PGmc *berhtaz "bright": Berta, Bertamirus, Bertarius, Bertinus, Berto, Bertosinda, Bertuara, Betrulfus, Bretenandus, Vertila
- bett-, bitt-, probably to PGmc *bitraz "bitter": Betellus, Betericus, Bitilo, Bitto
- bid-, to PGmc *bidō "request, prayer": Biddi, Bidualdus
- bil-, bel-, to PGmc *bilaz "good" or *bīþlan "axe": Bela, Belavrida, Belesarius, Belestrio, Belfonsus, Bellengo, Bellerto, Bello, Belloy, Belmirus, Billa
- bland- to PGmc *blandiz, likely an adjective derived from *blandaną "to blend, make murky; to mix, mingle": Blandila
- bliv-, to PGmc *blēwaz "blue": Bliviaricus
- bon-, to PGmc *bōniz "prayer, petition": Bonesindus, Bonilde, Bonimiro, Boninus, Boniza, Bonoi
- bot-, but-, to PGmc *bōtō "good, profit": Botan, Butila
- brand-, to PGmc *brandaz "fire, sword": Brandericus, Brandila, Brandinus, Brandiulfus, Brandon
- brun-, to PGmc *brunjōn "breastplate": Brunildi
- burgal-, to *Bulgar- "? Bulgarian": Burgala
- ca-, to PGmc *ga- "with": Camundus
- canut-, to PGmc *knūtaz "bold": Canuto
- car-, kar-, to PGmc *karō "care": Karmirus
- carl-, to PGmc *karlaz "man": Carlo
- cart-, kart-, to PGmc *krattaz "cart, wagon": Cartinus, Cartemirus
- cen-, to PGmc *kwenōn "woman": Cenabrida, Cenusenda
- cend-, kend-, zend-, quint-, to PGmc *kenþan "child": Cendamiro, Cendas, Cendon, Kenderedus, Kendulfus, Kindiverga, Quintila, Quintilo, Zendasindo
- cens-, zens-, possibly to PGmc *zinz "tribute" or *kwēniz "woman": Censerigus, Censoi, Zenzitus
- conia-, to PGmc *kunjan "tribe, nation": Coniaricus
- cresc-, possibly to Latin crescens "thrive": Crescemirus
- criz-, to PGmc *krēsō "dainty, food": Crizila
- dad-, ded-, to PGmc *dēdiz "deed": Dada, Dadila, Dadilo, Dadinus, Dado, Dede
- dag-, dac-, to PGmc *dagaz "day": Dacamiro, Dacoi, Dagadrudia, Dacaredus, Dago, Daildus
- dan-, da-, to PGmc *daniz "Dane": Damiro, Damondus, Danila
- dest-, test-, possibly to Latin dexter "right, skilful": Destoy, Destericus, Desteilli
- doc-, duc-, to PGmc *dōgiz "day": Docemiro, Ducila
- dod-, no clear etymology; possibly to PGmc *dēdiz "deed": Dodo, Doda
- dom-, to PGmc *dōmaz "judgement, ruling": Domerigo
- dulc-, dolc-, to PGmc *dulgan "enmity", *dulgaz 'law, debt': Dulcemirus, Dolcemondus
- ebr-, ebur-, evor-, to *eburaz "boar": Ebragundia, Ebreguldus, Ebregulfus, Ebrildi, Eburicus, Evorinus
- elp-, to PGmc *helpō "help": Elperico
- elpand-, to Germanic *elpandus "elephant": Elpandus
- engl-, to PGmc *angilaz "Angles": Engladius
- engo-, to PGmc *Ingwaz "a god": Engomirus, Engoredus, Engorigus
- ens-, possibly to Latin ensis "sword": Ensalde, Iensericus
- er-, her-, to PGmc *heruz "sword": Erifonsus, Eroigius, Eruulfus, Herus
- erm-, herm-, to PGmc *ermenaz "great": Ermaldus, Ermedrudia, Ermefara, Ermefreda, Ermefredo, Ermegildus, Ermegis, Ermego, Ermegoto, Ermegotus, Ermegundia, Ermelindus, Ermemirus, Ermericus, Ermerote, Ermesinda, Ermiarius, Ermila, Ermildi, Ermileuva, Ermitus, Ermoleo, Ermosindus, Ermoygius, Ermulfo, Heremigarium, Hermecisclus, Hermellus
- evo-, to PGmc *ehwaz "horse": Euvenandus, Eva, Evorido, Evosindo, Ivolicus, Ibilli
- faf-, to PGmc *faff-, possibly related to Indo-European *papp- "dad": Faffila, Faffia
- fag-, to PGmc *fagenaz "glad, joyful": Fagila, Fagildus, Fagilo, Faginus
- fald-, to PGmc *faldiz "fold, cloak": Falderedo, Falgildus, Fardulfus
- fand-, to PGmc *fanþjōn "infantryman": Fandila, Fandina, Fandinus, Fannus
- faq-, fak-, to PGmc *fah- "glad, joyful": Facalo, Facco, Fakino, Faquilo
- far-, to PGmc *faran "journey, ship": Faregia, Farella, Farino, Farita, Farnus, Framiro, Fraredus, Frarigo, Fregulfus, Ferildi
- fat-, to PGmc *fatan "cloth; vessel": Fatu, Fateredus
- fel-, fil-, to PGmc *felu "much, very": Felellus, Felgirus, Felmiro, Filisteus, Filivertus, Filon
- flor-, to PGmc *flōraz "floor" or Latin florens "blooming, prosperous": Floresindus
- fof-, possibly to PGmc *fōþrą "load, wagonload": Fofo, Fofinus, Fofellus
- fons-, funs-, to PGmc *funsaz "eager, ready": Fonso, Fonsa, Fonsinus, Fonsellus
- fradi-, to PGmc *fraþīn "efficacy": Fradegundia, Fradila, Fradiulfus
- fram-, to PGmc *framaz "forward; valiant": Framila, Framilli, Framtan, Framuldo
- frank-, franc-, to PGmc *frankōn "javelin; Frank": Francellus, Francemirus, Franco, Francoi, Francolino, Frankila, Frankilo
- fred-, frid-, to PGmc *friþuz "peace" or *frīdaz "fair, beautiful": Freda, Fredamundus, Fredario, Fredegundia, Fredemiro, Fredenanda, Fredenandus, Fredericus, Fredesinda, Fredilli, Fredisclus, Fredoaldus, Fredoindus, Fredosindus, Freduarius, Fredulfus, Fredus, Fridiverto
- froa-, frau-, frog-, froy-, fron-, to PGmc *frawjōn "lord, master": Froarengus, Fralenko, Frogeva, Frogildi, Frogina, Frogiulfo, Froiellus, Froila, Froilo, Froiloba, Froisenda, Froisendus, Fronildi, Fronosili, Fronuldo, Froya, Froyo, Froyslo, Fruaricus, Frugildus, Fruginus, Frauino, Frumirus, Frunilo
- frum-, from-, to PGmc *frumōn "foremost, first" and *frumistaz "first": Fromista, Fremosilli, Fromaldus, Fromaricus, Fromildus, Fromosinda, Fromosindus, Fruma, Frumarius, Frumellus, Frumildi
- fulc-, to PGmc *fulkan "crow, army": Fulcaredus
- gad-, gat-, to PGmc *gadōn "comrade": Gademiro, Gadenanda, Gaton
- gael-, gel-, to PGmc *gailaz "merry": Gaella, Gelmiro, Geloira
- gaf-, gef-, geb-, to PGmc *gebō "gift": Gaffo, Gebuldus, Gefera
- gaid-, to PGmc *gaidō "spearhead, arrowhead": Gaidus
- gaif-, to PGmc *waibjanan "to surround": Gaifar
- galind-, kalend-, to PGmc *galind- "Galindian" (a Baltic people): Galindus, Kalendus
- gan-, possibly to Germanic gan "enchantment": Ganati, Ganilli, Ganiti, Ganoi
- gand-, to PGmc *gandaz "wand, staff": Gandila, Gandinus, Gandulfo, Gandus
- gard-, to PGmc *gardaz "house, enclosure": Gardingus, Gardulfus
- gas-, ges-, gis-, ger-, gir-, to PGmc *gaizaz "spear": Gasuildi, Gera, Gesa, Gero, Geserigus, Gesmira, Germira, Gesmiro, Gesulfus, Ierulfus, Giraldus, Gismundus, Germundus, Gisovredus, Gisvado
- gast-, to PGmc *gastiz "guest": Gastre
- gaud-, caud-, no clear etymology; possibly to *gaut- "Goth" or Latin gaudeo "rejoice": Caudemirus, Gauderigus, Gaudesindo, Gaudilani, Gaudilli, Gaudinas
- gav-, gau-, gogi-, cogi-, gagi-, cagi-, kegi-, to PGmc *gaujan "district": Cagildo, Cagita, Cagitus, Gagica, Gaufredus, Gaulfus, Gavila, Gavina, Gavinus, Gega, Gegitus, Gigelus, Gogia, Gogilli, Gogina, Gogitus, Gogius, Goymundus, Guimundus, Guginus, Gugivertus, Guimirus, Guiricus, Guisenda, Goysenda, Guisindus, Kagilda, Keila
- geld-, gild-, kelt-, to PGmc *geldan "tribute, recompense": Geldemirus, Gildaricus, Gildo, Keltoi
- gen-, ian-, ion-, to PGmc *gennan "beginning": Genildi, Ionilde, Genlo, Genobreda, Gemundus, Ianardo, Ionarico
- gend-, possibly to PGmc *gantijaną "To make whole; make complete": Gendo, Gendina
- get-, git-, "glory": Geda, Getericus, Getilli, Getina, Getoy, Gidiberto, Gitarius, Gitesindus, Gitio
- gisl-, viscl-, cisl-, to PGmc *gīslaz "hostage": Cisla, Viclavara, Viscaverga, Visclafredo, Visclamirus, Visclamundus, Visclario
- givel-, to PGmc *geb(e)lōn "skull, gable": Givellan
- glad-, to PGmc *gladaz "bright, glad": Gladila
- god-, gud- (later go-, gu-), to PGmc *gōdaz "good": Godefredus, Godegildus, Godella, Godellus, Godemiro, Godenanda, Godesinda, Godoigia, Godomundus, Gudenandus, Guderedus, Guderigo, Gudesindus, Gudesteus, Gudigeba, Gudila, Gudileuva, Gudilo, Gudilulfo, Gudiverga
- gol-, to PGmc *gōljanan "to greet", gōlaz "pride": Golinus, Gollo
- gom-, gum-, to PGmc *gumōn "man": Gomadus, Gomaldo, Gomaredus, Gomarigus, Gomesindo, Gomita, Gomulfus, Gomundus, Guma, Gumarius, Gumellus, Gumila, Gumito
- gram-, to PGmc *gramaz "furious": Gramila
- gran-, to PGmc *grannaz "slim, slender" or *granō "moustache": Granilo
- grim-, to PGmc *grīmōn "mask, helmet": Grima, Grimaldus
- gris-, to PGmc *grīsanan "to dread" or *grīsaz "grey": Grisulfus, Gresomarus
- guald-, to PGmc *waldaz "powerful, mighty": Gualdarius, Gualdeo
- guandal-, to PGmc *wandilaz "Vandal": Guandalisco, Guandalar
- guld-, to PGmc *wulþuz "splendour": Goldegildo, Goldredo, Guldarius, Gulderigus
- guldr-, goltr-, to PGmc *wulþraz "wonderful, precious": Goldregodo, Gulderes, Gualdramirus
- gulf-, golf-, to PGmc *wulfaz "wolf": Golfarico, Gulfarius, Gulfemirus
- gund-, gunt-, gunz-, cunt-, gond-, to PGmc *gunthz "fight": Gonceria, Gondella, Gondenanda, Gonso, Gonta, Gontemondus, Gontere, Gonderes, Gontoi, Gontualdo, Gonza, Guncitus, Gundarius, Gundebredo, Gundebrida, Gundelinus, Gundemarus, Gunderamnus, Gunderedo, Gunderigus, Gunderona, Gundertia, Gundesindus, Gundifortis, Gundigeva, Gundila, Gundilo, Gundisalva, Gundisalvus, Gundiscalcus, Gundivadus, Gundivaldo, Gundivera, Gundiverga, Gundon, Gundulfo, Guntato, Guntedrudia, Guntellus, Guntemirus, Gunterotis, Gunti, Guntiesclo, Guntigio, Guntilli, Gundesilli, Guntina, Guntinus, Guntuigia
- gut- (later god-), to PGmc *gutōn "Goth": Gotesendus, Goto, Gota, Goton, Gudegisus, Gutellus, Gutemirus, Gutemondo, Gutilli, Gutilo, Gutina, Gutinus, Guto, Guta, Gutumarus
- hend-, ind-, hand-, probably related to Burgundian hendinus "king": Endulfus, Hamdino, Indisclus
- hild-, ild-, eld-, ald-, to PGmc *heldjō "battle": Alderedus, Alduarius, Eldan, Eldebona, Eldegeses, Eldegotus, Eldegundia, Eldemirus, Eldemundus, Eldesinda, Eldesindus, Eldigia, Eldinus, Eldivercus, Eldivertus, Eldo, Eldoigius, Elleca, Ildebredus, Ildefonsus, Ilderigus, Ildiverga, Ildoi, Ildoncia, Ildras, Ilduara, Ildulfus
- ik-, eq-, ig-, possibly to PGmc *eka "I": Igo, Ika, Ikila
- it-, id- (no clear etymology): Idiverto, Itila, Itilo, Itimondo, Itaultus
- iuv-, iub- no clear etymology; possibly to Latin iuvenis "young" or a metathesis of PGmc *webaną "to weave" (cf. *wesuz → ius-, *westan → iust-): Iovellinus, Iubarius, Iubinus, Iuuisclus, Iuvatus, Iuvericus, Iuvila, Iuvitus
- ket-, qued-, quid-, to PGmc *kweþanan "to say": Kedisilo, Ketemera, Ketenando, Keti, Ketoi, Quedesendo, Quedulfus, Quidemirus, Quidericus, Quitarius, Quitoi
- lal-, lel-, lil- probably to Latin lallus "lullaby": Lalla, Lalli, Lallina, Lallinus, Lallus, Lelino, Leliola, Lilliola, Lelli, Lilla, Lilli, Lillo, Lilla
- leo-, to PGmc *hlewaz "glory, renown": Leomirus
- leode-, leude-, to PGmc *leudiz "man, people": Ledla, Leodarius, Leodefredus, Leodegasti, Leodegisius, Leodegundia, Leodemiro, Leodemundo, Leoderigus, Leodesindo, Leodeuigus, Leodo, Leodulfus
- leov-, leub-, to PGmc *leubaz "beloved": Leovaldo, Leovegildus, Leovegoto, Leoveredus, Leoverigus, Leoverona, Leoverto, Leovesenda, Leovesindus, Leovilli, Leovus, Leuba, Leubegutus, Liuvilo, Lovoi, Lubellus, Lubila, Lubinus
- lot-, to PGmc *hludaz "famous": Lotarius
- mact- (later meit-), to PGmc *mahtiz "power, might": Meitinus, Matericus, Mectubrida, Meitilli, Meitulfus
- mag-, to PGmc *magenan "might, power": Magan, Magila, Magitus, Maniaricus, Maniarius, Magnitus, Maniulfus, Megildus
- mal- (unclear etymology, possibly related to PGmc *malanan "to grind"): Malaricus, Malaredus
- malasc-, possibly to PGmc *malskaz "proud": Malasco
- maldr-, possibly to PGmc *maldriz "flour": Maldras
- man- (later ma-), to PGmc *manan "fellow": Manildi, Manusildi, Manileuva, Manilla, Maninus, Manosenda, Manosindus, Manualdus, Manulfus, Menegundia
- mand-, mant-, to PGmc *manþaz "kind": Mandila, Mandinus, Mandulfo, Mantellus
- mann- (later man-), to PGmc *mannz "man": Manitus, Manna, Mannello, Manni, Manno, Manoim, Mansuara
- marc-, to PGmc *markō "region, border" or *marhaz "horse": Marco, Marcosendus, Marcitus
- mart-, possibly to PGmc *marþuz "marten": Martila
- matl-, matr-, to PGmc *maþlan "assembly": Matrosindus, Matrinus, Matroi
- maur- (later mour-), possibly to PGmc *mauraz "ant" or Latin maurus "Moor": Mauran, Maurentan, Maurican, Mauron
- medum- (later meom-), to PGmc *medumaz "middling, moderate": Meduma
- mer-, mir-, mar-, to PGmc *mērjaz "famous": Margilli, Merila, Meroildi, Mervigius, Mira, Mirella, Mirellus, Miro, Mirosinda, Mirualdo
- mod-, mud-, to PGmc *mōdaz "anger, wrath": Modericus, Moderido, Modildus, Modilli, Mudario, Mudila
- mun-, mon-, to PGmc *muniz "thought": Monefonsus, Monobredo, Munisclus
- mund-, mond-, to PGmc *mundō "protection": Monderico, Mondoi, Mundellus, Mundila, Mundildus, Mundinus, Mundus
- nand-, nant-, to PGmc *nanþaz "bold, courageous": Nandamundus, Nandaricus, Nandinus, Nandoi, Nandulfo, Nandus, Nantemiro, Nantildo
- naust-, to PGmc *naustą "a ship-shed, boathouse": Naustus, Naustila
- neu-, nu-, to PGmc *neujaz "new": Nuilla, Nuillo, Neufila
- nit-, to PGmc *nīþaz "hatred" or *niþjaz "kinsman": Nitigisius
- not-, to PGmc *nauthiz "need": Notarius
- of-, to PGmc *ubjōn "abundance": Offa, Ofila, Offilo
- old-, to PGmc *hulþaz "kind, clement": Olda, Oldaricus
- opp-, possibly to PGmc *ōbjanan "to celebrate solemnly" (related to Latin opus "work"): Oppa, Oppila
- osd-, to PGmc *huzdan "treasure": Osdulfus
- pant-, to PGmc *pandan "pledge" or *banti "district": Pantardus, Panto, Pantinus
- pap-, pep- no clear etymology; possibly to PGmc *pipo "A pipe or flute; a wind instrument." or Latin pāpiliō "butterfly, moth": Papellus, Papitus, Pappinus, Pappo, Pepi, Pipericus, Pipinus
- penn-, pen- possibly to Latin penna "feather": Penetrudia, Penus, Pennino
- rad-, rat-, to PGmc *rēdaz "advice": Rademirus, Rademundus, Radesindus, Radulfus, Ratario, Retericus
- ragi-, ragn- (later rei-), to PGmc *raginą "advice, decision": Ragesenda, Ragesindus, Ragian, Ragifredo, Ragimiru, Ragito, Ragolfus, Raiola, Raiolo, Reginaldus, Reimondus, Reirigus
- rak-, to PGmc *rakan "reason, talk" or *wrakaz "pursuer": Rakericus
- ram-, to PGmc *rammaz "strong; ram": Ramila, Ramon, Ramulo
- rana-, rani- (later ra-), probably to PGmc *rannjanan "to run": Ranarius, Ranemira, Ranemirus, Ranemundus, Ranilo, Ranisclus, Raniverga, Raniverta, Ranivertus, Ranosenda, Ranosindus, Ranualdus, Ranulfus
- rand-, rant-, to PGmc *randaz "shield": Randemirus, Randili, Randinus, Rando, Randuarius, Randulfus, Rendericus
- raup-, to PGmc *raupjanan "to plunder, to spoil": Rauparius
- rec-, req-, ric-, to PGmc *rīkjaz "mighty, noble": Recaredus, Reccafredus, Recebrida, Recedrudia, Recelli, Recemera, Recemirus, Recemundus, Recesenda, Recesindus, Recesuinda, Recesuindus, Rechiarius, Recilli, Requilli, Recinus, Recualdus, Regaulfus, Reicionda, Rekeritus, Requefonsus, Rezevera, Ricardo, Riquila, Riquilo, Riquilodo, Riquoi
- ref-, to PGmc *hrabnaz "crow": Refulfo
- rem-, to PGmc *remez "rest, calmness": Remegildus, Remesario, Remesilli, Remesindus, Remestro, Remismundus, Remisol, Rimionda
- rest-, to PGmc *ristiz "rising up": Restericus
- rod-, rud-, to PGmc *hrōþaz "fame": Rodemirus, Rodevertus, Rodosildi, Rodougus, Roelindus, Rouvredo, Rudericus, Rudesindus, Rudila, Rudilo
- rom-, rum-, to PGmc *hrōmaz "fame": Romarigus, Romila, Rumario
- sala- (later sa-), to PGmc *salaz 'hall, dwelling': Salamirus, Salamarus, Salla
- sand-, sant-, to PGmc *sanþaz "truth, justice": Sandinus, Sando, Santimirus
- sar-, to PGmc *sarwan "arm, armament": Saroi, Saruilli
- sax- (later seix-), to PGmc *sahsan "knife" and *sahxōn "Saxon": Saxo, Seixomir
- scap-, to PGmc *skapan "vessel": Scapa
- scarc-, to PGmc *skalkaz "servant; sword": Scarcila
- scer-, to PGmc *skīriz "pure": Scerinus
- sed-, to PGmc *seduz "custom": Sedino
- sedeg-, to PGmc *sedīgaz "well-bred, well-behaved": Sedeges
- seg-, sag-, sig- (later se-, si-), to PGmc *segez "victory": Sagatus, Sagildo, Sagulfus, Segemundus, Segesindo, Segestro, Segga, Segika, Segimarus, Segioi, Segomirus, Seguinus, Sigeberto, Sigefrida, Sigeredus, Sigericus, Sigesgundia, Sigesinda, Sigila, Sigu, Segio
- sel-, to PGmc *sēliz "good, kind": Selmirus, Seloi
- selv-, to PGmc *selbaz "self": Selvas, Selvatus
- sen-, sin-, to PGmc *senaz "ever, old": Senatrudia, Seniberta, Senildi, Senuita, Senuldo, Sinerta, Sinifredus
- send-, sent-, to PGmc *senþaz "companion" or *swenþaz "strong": Senda, Sendamirus, Sendello, Sendericus, Senderiga, Sendina, Sendinus, Sendoi, Sendon, Sendredus, Senduitu, Sendulfus, Senta, Sentarius, Sindamundus, Sindi, Sindigis, Sindila, Sindileuba, Sindilo, Sindiverga, Sindo, Sinduara
- ser-, to PGmc *swēraz "valued, honoured": Seririgo, Serulfus, Servaldus
- sigunt-, to PGmc *sebunþōn "seventh": Sigunterigo
- sis-, ses-, possibly related to Old High German sisu "funerary song, ritual": Sescutus, Sesericus, Sesina, Sesmiro, Sesmundo, Sesoi, Sesuito, Sisa, Sisebutus, Sisegundia, Sisellus, Sisildus, Sisileova, Sisilli, Sisilu, Sisinus, Sisiverta, Sisiverto, Sisivigia, Sisnandus, Sisualdo, Sisuita, Sisuldus, Sisulfus, Zisila
- sit-, to PGmc *setan "seat": Sitagellus, Siti, Sitividis
- smer-, to PGmc *smerwōn "fat": Smerlo
- sontr-, suntr-, to PGmc *sunþrjaz "southern": Sontrilli, Suntria
- span-, to PGmc *spananan "to lead": Spanaricu, Spanarius, Spanilo, Spanosendo, Spanubrida
- spand-, possibly to *spannanan "to join": Spandaricus
- spar-, to PGmc *sparwaz "sparrow": Espallo, Sparuildi
- speraut-, to PGmc *spreutanan "to sprout": Sperautan
- spint-, to PGmc *spenþa "fat": Spintilo, Spintino
- spod- (later espo-), possibly to PGmc *spōdiz "prosperity, success": Spodemiro, Spoderigo
- stan-, to PGmc *stainaz "stone": Stanildi
- stod-, possibly to PGmc *stōdą "a herd of horses": Stodildi
- strouc-, to PGmc *streukanan "to stroke": Strouco
- suab-, sab-, sav-, sev-, to PGmc *swēbaz "Suebian": Sabaredus, Sabegoto, Sabila, Sabita, Sabitus, Savaracus, Savaricus, Savegodus, Savildi, Savoy, Sevegildo, Suabas, Suavar
- sue-, to PGmc *swe- "own": Sueredus, Suimirus
- sund-, sunt-, to PGmc *sunþiz "south": Sundemirus, Suntarius
- suni-, seni-, sani-, soni-, to PGmc *sunjō "truth": Sanigia, Seniaredus, Seniulfus, Sonegildus, Songimera, Soniaricus, Sonifreda, Sonita, Suniagisclus, Suniarius, Suniemirus, Sunila, Sunildi, Sunilo, Sunitus
- sunn-, to PGmc *sunnan "sun": Sonna
- tanc-, to PGmc *þankaz "favor, grace": Tancila, Tancinus, Tancus, Tanquilli
- tanth-, to PGmc *tanþz "tooth": Tandus
- tat-, zaz-, to PGmc *taitaz "radiant; bright": Tata, Tatina, Zazitus, Zazo
- teg-, to PGmc *þegnaz "thane, freeman": Tegila, Tegino, Tegio, Tegitus
- teq-, possibly to PGmc *tēkaną "to touch, to grasp" or *tehwō "order, array" via alteration of H to K: Tequilo, Texilli
- teud-, teod-, tod-, ted- (later teo-), to PGmc *þeudō "nation" and *þeudanaz "king": Teadario, Tederona, Tedoy, Teobaldus, Teoda, Teodefredo, Teodegildo, Teodegondia, Teodemirus, Teodemundus, Teodenandus, Teoderados, Teoderago, Teoderedus, Teodericus, Teodesinda, Teodesindus, Teodeverga, Teodiberta, Teodila, Teodildi, Teodilo, Teodinus, Teodisclus, Teodiu, Teodoriga, Teodulfus, Teton, Teudecutus, Teudisila, Theodivertus, Tiotevadus, Todegia, Todegogia, Toduldo, Tota, Tudiscaisum
- tit-, tet-, to PGmc *taitōn "little boy": Tetina, Titila
- tors-, turis-, to PGmc *þursaz "giant": Torsario, Turisulfus
- trad-, to PGmc þrēdaz "quick": Tradus, Tradinus
- tras-, to PGmc *þrasō "move, fight": Tracinus, Trasaricus, Trasarius, Trasavara, Trasendus, Trasido, Trasilli, Trasiuadus, Trasmira, Trasmiro, Trasmondo, Trasoi, Trassemutus, Trasuarius, Trasuinda, Trasulfus
- trast-, to PGmc *traustaz "strong": Trastalo, Trastelus, Trastemiro, Trastidia, Trastina, Trastulfus, Trastivigia
- trevu-, to PGmc *trewwaz "faithful": Trevuleus
- truct- (later troit-) to *druhtiz "people, army" and druhtīnaz "lord, master": Tructinus, Tructa, Tructemiro, Tructemondo, Tructericus, Tructesinda, Tructesindus, Tructilli, Tructus, Truitellus, Truitero
- trud-, to PGmc *drūdaz "friend, beloved": Truda, Trudigildus, Trudildi, Trudilo, Trudina, Trudinus, Trudulfus
- tund-, tunt-, to PGmc *tunþuz "tooth": Tumtuldo, Tundulfus, Tuntila
- un-, on-, to PGmc *hūnaz "cub" and "Hun": Uniscus, Unisco, Onaredus, Onegilda, Onegildo, Onemirus, Onesindus, Onildi, Unilli, Onoricus, Onosinda, Unemundus, Unileus, Unilla
- vad-, guad- (later gua-, ga-), to PGmc *wadaz "ford": Guadla, Uaduuara, Vadamundus, Vademirus
- vala-, guala-, quala-, to PGmc *walaz "the slain, battlefield" or *walhaz "Celt": Gualamarius, Gualamira, Gualamirus, Qualatrudia, Qualavara, Valarius
- vamb-, to PGmc *wambō "belly": Vamba
- vand-, guand-, to PGmc *wanduz "wand, rod": Guanadildi, Guandila, Guandilo, Guantaldus, Vandino, Vuanda
- ven-, guin-, to PGmc *weniz "friend": Guina, Guinilli, Uenildi, Guinus
- venet-, guend-, vened-, genit-, to PGmc *wenedaz "Vendian, Slav": Genitigia, Guendo, Venedario, Venetricus
- ver-, to PGmc *wērō "pledge; true": Vera, Vermundus, Veremudus
- via-, possibly to PGmc *wīhan "temple": Viaricus, Viamundus
- vidr-, vedr-, quitr-, to PGmc *wiþra "against": Quitre, Vederoi, Vedragese, Vedrailli, Vidragildus, Vidraldus, Vidramirus
- vidub-, to PGmc *widuwaz "widowed": Vidubas
- vig-, veg-, to PGmc *wīgaz "fighter": Uegitus, Vigila, Vigilli, Vigilo, Vigiltu, Vigoy
- vil-, guil-, quil-, to PGmc *weljōn "will": Guiliberto, Quella, Uiliaredus, Uilloi, Gilloi, Vilesinda, Viliamirus, Vilian, Viliaricu, Viliarius, Viliatus, Viliefredus, Vilifonsus, Viligus, Vilitro, Viliulfus, Vilivado, Villavaria, Villelmus, Villisendo, Villo
- vim- to PGmc *wīgą "fight, battle": Guimarigus, Uimaredus, Viman, Vimara
- vinc-, to PGmc *wenkjanan "to move sideways, to avoid": Venze, Vincila
- vis-, ius-, to PGmc *wesuz "good": Iusuandus, Uisulfus, Usegildus, Visaldus, Visaridus, Visellu
- visand-, to PGmc *wisundaz "bison": Visandus
- vist-, iust-, to PGmc *westan "west": Iusterigo, Iustiarius, Iustila, Vistemundo, Vistesinda, Iustesenda, Vistiberga, Vistisclo, Vistivara, Wistiz
- vistr-, iustr-, to PGmc *westraz "westward": Iustri, Uistrello, Uistrileuba, Vestregoti, Visterla, Visterlo, Vistragildus, Vistramundi, Vistraricus, Vistrarius, Vistravara, Vistravarius, Vistregia, Vistremiro, Vistresindus, Vistrevius, Vistrildi, Vistresilli, Vistroi
- vit- (later vid-), to PGmc *witan "knowledge": Uita, Vidila, Vitinus, Vitisclus
- vitt-, vict (later vit-), to PGmc *witjan "comprehension": Uiti, Uittina, Victemirus, Victericus, Vitarius, Vitas, Vitila, Vitildus, Vitiza, Vittimero
- viv, oyv-, to PGmc *wīban "wife, woman": Oyeuio, Vivildus
- viz-, quiz-, unclear etymology, the alteration of v to qu suggests that the original word started with an hw- cluster, possibly to PGmc *hwis "to hiss, to rush, make a rushing sound": Quizino, Viza, Vizamundus, Vizila, Vizoi

=== Feminine roots ===
Elements common as the second syllable of feminine names include:

- -berta, -verta, PGmc *berhtō "bright": Aliverta, Raniverta, Sisiverta, Teodiverta
- -berga, -verga, PGmc *bergō "shelter": Aliverga, Astriverga, Gundiverga, Ildiverga, Kindiverga, Raniverga, Sindiverga, Teodeverga, Viscaverga, Vistiberga
- -drudia/-trudia (later -druia), PGmc *drūd-jō "friend, beloved": Alatrudia, Aniedrudia, Ansetrudia, Dagadrudia, Entrudi, Ermedrudia, Guntedrudia, Penetrudia, Qualatrudia, Recedrudia, Senatrudia
- -fara, PGmc *farō "journey": Ermefara
- -freda/-breda/-brida/-vrida, PGmc *friþ-ō "peace": Alifreda, Alobrida, Ansobrida, Belavrida, Genobreda, Gundebrida, Mectubrida, Recebrida, Sigefrida, Sonifreda, Spanubrida
- -fonsa, PGmc *funs-ō "eager, ready": Argifonsa
- -go, PGmc *gauj-ō "region, district": Ermego
- -geba/-geva (later -eva), PGmc *gebō "gift": Argeva, Frogeva, Gudigeba, Gundigeva
- -gelda, PGmc *geld-ō "reward": Kagilda, Onegilda
- -isila, -gīsl-ō "hostage, sprout": Teudisila
- -goto/-godo, PGmc *gaut-ō "Goth woman": Astrogoto, Ermegoto, Goldregodo, Leovegoto, Sabegoto, Vestregoti
- -cuntia/-cundia/-guntia/-gundia/-gunza/-onda, PGmc *gunþ-jō "fight": Adegundia, Alaguntia, Ansiunda, Aragunti, Astragundia, Bergundi, Ebragundia, Eigonza, Eldegundia, Ermegundia, Fradegundia, Helaguntia, Ildoncia, Leodegundia, Menegundia, Reicionda, Rimionda, Sigesgundia, Siseguntia, Teodogoncia, Treitegundia
- -ildi, -illi, PGmc *heldiz "battle": Abronilli, Amalilli, Ansuildi, Argenilli, Aruildi, Astruildi, Aurilli, Barsilli, Barilli, Berildi, Berosildi, Bonilde, Brunildi, Desteilli, Donadildi, Ebrildi, Ebrailli, Ermildi, Framilli, Fremosilli, Frogildi, Fronildi, Fronosili, Frumildi, Ganilli, Gasuildi, Gaudilli, Genildi, Ionilde, Getilli, Gogilli, Guanadildi, Guananildi, Guinilli, Uenildi, Guntilli, Gundesilli, Gutilli, Ibilli, Leovilli, Manildi, Manusildi, Margilli, Meitilli, Meroildi, Modilli, Onildi, Unilli, Randili, Recilli, Requilli, Remesilli, Rodosildi, Saruilli, Sarilli, Savildi, Senildi, Sisilli, Sontrilli, Sparuildi, Stanildi, Stodildi, Sunildi, Tanquilli, Tenildi, Teodildi, Texilli, Trasilli, Trasuildi, Tructilli, Trudildi, Vedrailli, Vergilli, Vigilli, Vistrildi, Vistresilli
- -leuba, -leova, PGmc *leub-ō "beloved": Adileova, Ansileova, Argileuva, Asileva, Astileuva, Eileuva, Ermileuva, Froiloba, Gudileuva, Manileuva, Sindileuba, Sisileova, Uistrileuba
- -mira, -mera, PGmc *mēr-ō "famous, excellent": Gesmira, Germira, Giudimira, Gualamira, Ketemera, Ranemira, Recemera, Songimera, Trasmira
- -nanda (later -anda), PGmc *nanþ-ō "bold, courageous": Fredenanda, Gadenanda, Godenanda, Gondenanda
- -rica (later -riga), PGmc *rīk-ō "ruler": Odorica, Senderiga, Teodoriga
- -rotis, PGmc *rōt-iz "glad, cheerful": Gunterotis
- -rona, PGmc *rūnō "mystery, secret": Gunderona, Leoverona, Tederona
- -senda, -sinda, PGmc *senþ-ō "companion" or *swenþ-ō "strong": Adosinda, Arosinda, Audesinda, Bertosinda, Cenusenda, Eldesinda, Ermesinda, Eudisinda, Fredesinda, Froisenda, Fromosinda, Godesinda, Guisenda, Goysenda, Leovesenda, Manosenda, Mirosinda, Obstrisinda, Onosinda, Orosinda, Peruisenda, Ragesenda, Ranosenda, Recesenda, Sigesinda, Teodesinda, Tructesinda, Vilesinda, Vistesinda, Iustesenda
- -suenda, -suinda, PGmc *swenþ-ō "strong": Recesuinda, Trasuinda
- -vara, PGmc *warō "care, attention; possession": Astruara, Bertuara, Ilduara, Mansuara, Qualavara, Rezevera, Sinduara, Trasavara, Uaduuara, Visclavara, Villavaria, Vistivara, Vistravara
- -vera, PGmc *wērō "pledge, plight": Gelvira, Gundivera
- -vigia, -igia, PGmc *wīg-jō "fighter": Genitigia, Godoigia, Guntuigia, Sanigia, Sisivigia, Trastivigia, Vistregia
- -vita, -vidis, probably related to PGmc *witjan "knowledge, comprehension": :Senuita, Sisuita, Sitividis

Suffixes used to derive hypocoristic feminine names include:

- -alo: Facalo, Trastalo
- -ilo (later -io): Acilo, Andilo, Anilo, Ansilo, Ardilo, Argilo, Berilo, Bitilo, Cisilo, Dadilo, Egilo, Ailo, Emilo, Esmerlo, Espallo, Fagilo, Faquilo, Frankilo, Froilo, Frunilo, Genilo, Genlo, Geodilo, Gracilo, Granilo, Guandilo, Gudilo, Gundilo, Gutilo, Itilo, Liuvilo, Nisilo, Nuillo, Nunnilo, Quintilo, Ranilo, Riquilo, Rudilo, Sindilo, Sisilu, Spanilo, Spintilo, Sunilo, Tafila, Teodilo, Tequilo, Trudilo, Vigilo, Visterlo
- -ina: Bagina, Baquina, Berina, Fandina, Frogina, Gavina, Gendina, Getina, Gogina, Guntina, Gutina, Lallina, Nunnina, Sendina, Sesina, Tanina, Tidina, Tetina, Trastina, Trudina, Vergina, Zanina
- -ita (later -ida): Acita, Cagita, Farita, Gomita, Nunnita, Sabita, Sonita
- -ella: Farella, Gondella, Mirella, Nunella

=== Masculine roots ===
Elements common as the second syllable of masculine names include:

- -badus, -vadus, PGmc *badwō "fight": Argevadus, Gisvado, Gundivadus, Tiotevadus, Trasiuadus, Vilivado
- -baldus, -valdus, PGmc *balþaz "bold": Gundivaldo, Teobaldus
- -bertus, -vertus, PGmc *berhtaz "bright": Alivertus, Ansvertus, Argeberto, Audibertus, Eldivertus, Filivertus, Fridiverto, Geodevertus, Gidiberto, Gugivertus, Guiliberto, Idiverto, Leoverto, Ranivertus, Rodevertus, Sigeberto, Sisiverto, Theodivertus
- -butus, PGmc *bōtō "profit, usefulness": Sisebutus
- -fredus, -fridus, -bredus, -vredus (later -vreu), PGmc *friþuz "peace": Alliefredus, Argifredus, Audofredo, Erdebredo, Ermefredo, Geodefredo, Gisovredus, Godefredus, Gundebredo, Ildebredus, Leodefredus, Monobredo, Osobredus, Ostrofredo, Ragifredo, Reccafredus, Rouvredo, Sinifredus, Teodefredo, Viliefredus, Visclafredo
- -funsus, -fonsus, -bonsus, PGmc *funsaz "eager, ready": Adefonsus, Andifonso, Argefonsus, Belfonsus, Erifonsus, Ildefonsus, Monefonsus, Requefonsus, Vilifonsus
- -fortis, probably Latin fortis "strong": Gundifortis
- -gis, -ges, -geses, -garius, PGmc *gaizaz "spear": Adeqisio, Astragis, Eldegeses, Ermegis, Felgirus, Gudegisus, Heremigarium, Leodegisius, Nitigisius, Sindigis, Tudiscaisum, Vedragese
- -gaster, -bastus, PGmc *gastiz "guest": Adegaster, Albiaster, Algaster, Ardabastus, Argivastro, Donagastro, Leodegasti
- -gotus, -godus, PGmc *gautaz "Goth": Eldegotus, Ermegotus, Leubegutus, Savegodus, Sescutus, Teudecutus, Visigotus
- -gogia, PGmc *gaujan "district": Todegogia
- -gildus, -ildus, PGmc *geld-az "reward": Anagildus, Aquisildus, Atanagildus, Cagildo, Daildus, Donegildus, Egildus, Agildus, Engildus, Ermegildus, Fagildus, Falgildus, Fredilli, Fromildus, Frugildus, Gaudilti, Geodegildus, Goldegildo, Leovegildus, Megildus, Modildus, Mundildus, Nantildo, Onegildo, Pabregildus, Pederagildu, Remegildus, Sagildo, Sevegildo, Sisildus, Sitagellus, Sonegildus, Tarildus, Teodegildo, Tudeildus, Trenelldus, Trudigildus, Uanagildi, Usegildus, Vidragildus, Vigiltu, Vistragildus, Vitildus, Vivildus
- -gisclus, -isclus, to -gīslaz "hostage, sprout": Fredisclus, Guntiesclo, Hermecisclus, Indisclus, Iuuisclus, Kedisilo, Munisclus, Odisclus, Ranisclus, Suniagisclus, Teodisclus, Vistisclo, Vitisclus
- -ardus, PGmc *harduz "hard": Ianardo, Pantardus, Ricardo
- -arius (later -eiro), PGmc *harjaz "army, host": Adarius, Agarius, Alarius, Amedeiro, Andiarius, Ascarius, Atarius, Aunarius, Baltarius, Bazarius, Belesarius, Bertarius, Cufarius, Donazarius, Ermiarius, Fredario, Frumarius, Gaifarius, Gitarius, Gualdarius, Guldarius, Gulfarius, Gumarius, Gundarius, Iubarius, Iustiarius, Leodarius, Lotarius, Magnarius, Mudario, Notarius, Olcarius, Quitarius, Ranarius, Ratario, Rauparius, Rechiarius, Remesario, Rumario, Sentarius, Spanarius, Suavarius, Suniarius, Suntarius, Teadario, Torsario, Trasarius, Truitero, Uandalarius, Valarius, Venedario, Viliarius, Visclario, Vistrarius, Vitarius
- -atus (later -ado), PGmc *haþuz "war": Alvatus, Andeatus, Astratus, Eugienadus, Ganati, Gomadus, Guanatus, Guntato, Iuvatus, Sagatus, Selvatus, Viliatus
- -elmus, PGmc *helmaz "helm": Villelmus
- -leus, PGmc *hlewaz "renown": Eilleus, Trevuleus, Unileus
- -ramnus, PGmc *hrabnaz "crow": Gunderamnus
- -ringus, -lenco, PGmc *hrengaz "ring": Froaringus, Fralenko
- -licus, PGmc *laikaz "dance, game, battle": Ivolicus
- -lindus, PGmc *lenþaz "gentle, mild": Ermelindus, Roelindus, Teodelindus
- -leobo, -levo, PGmc *leubaz "dear": Adileobo, Andilevo
- -marius, -marus (later -meiro), PGmc mērjaz "great, famous": Ansemarus, Astremarus, Baldemarius, Gresumarus, Gualamarius, Gundemarus, Gutumarus, Leudemarus, Salamarus, Segimarus, Zamarius
- -madus, PGmc *maþ- "good": Agimadus
- -mirus, -mero, PGmc *mērjaz "famous, excellent": Acimiro, Adimirus, Agromirus, Alamiro, Aldemirus, Ansemirus, Antemirus, Ariamiro, Argemirus, Artemiro, Aumiro, Bademirus, Baldemirus, Baudemirus, Belmirus, Bertamirus, Bonimiro, Cartemiro, Caudemirus, Cendamiro, Crescemirus, Crodemirus, Dacamiro, Damiro, Docemiro, Dulcemirus, Eimirus, Eldemirus, Engomirus, Ermemirus, Felmiro, Framiro, Francemirus, Franomiro, Fredemiro, Frumirus, Gademiro, Geldemirus, Gelmiro, Geodemirus, Gesmiro, Godemiro, Gualamirus, Guimirus, Guldremirus, Gulfemirus, Guntemirus, Gutemirus, Karmirus, Leodemiro, Leomirus, Nantemiro, Odamirus, Onemirus, Ostromirus, Astromirus, Estromirus, Quidemirus, Rademirus, Ragimiru, Randemirus, Ranemirus, Recemirus, Rodemirus, Salamirus, Santimirus, Saxomirus, Segomirus, Selmirus, Sendamirus, Sesmiro, Spodemirus, Suimirus, Sulfemirus, Sundemirus, Suniemirus, Teodemirus, Trasmiro, Trastemiro, Tructemiro, Vademirus, Victemirus, Vidramirus, Viliamirus, Visclamirus, Vistremiro, Vittimero
- -modus, PGmc *mōdaz "courage, anger, wrath": Trassemutus, Vermudus
- -mundus (later -mondo), *mundaz "protection, guardianship": Ansemondus, Argemondo, Arumundo, Asemondus, Astramondus, Atalamondo, Badamundus, Camundus, Damondus, Dolcemondus, Eldemundus, Fredamundus, Gemundus, Geodemondo, Gismundus, Germundus, Godomundus, Gomundus, Gontemondus, Goymundus, Guimundus, Gutemondo, Hermundus, Itimondo, Keremondus, Leodemundo, Nandamundus, Odemundus, Olemundus, Rademundus, Ranemundus, Recemundus, Reimondus, Remismundus, Rosamundus, Segemundus, Sesmundo, Sindamundus, Teodemundus, Trasmondo, Tructemondo, Unemundus, Vadamundus, Viamundus, Visclamundus, Vistemundo, Vistramundi, Vizamundus, Zamondo
- -nandus (later -ando), PGmc *nanþ-az "bold, courageous": Bretenandus, Ermenandus, Euvenandus, Fredenandus, Gudenandus, Ketenando, Reinantus, Riquinandus, Sisnandus, Teodenandus, Vittinandus
- -redus, -radus, -ridus (later -reu), PGmc *rēdaz "advice": Aderedus, Alderedus, Anseredo, Argeredus, Asoredus, Astredo, Balderedo, Dagaredus, Egeredus, Enaredus, Engoredus, Evorido, Falderedo, Fateredus, Fraredus, Fulcaredus, Goldredo, Gomaredus, Guderedus, Gunderedo, Kenderedus, Leoveredus, Malaredus, Moderido, Onaredus, Osoredo, Provaredo, Recaredus, Sabaredus, Sendredus, Seniaredus, Sigeredus, Sueredus, Teoderedus, Uiliaredus, Uimaredus, Visaridus
- -ricus (later -rigo), PGmc *rīkz "ruler, lord": Accaricus, Aderico, Alaricus, Aldericus, Aliaricus, Alvaricus, Andericus, Ansericus, Ardericus, Argericus, Ascarigus, Asparigus, Asterigo, Atanaricus, Atericus, Balderico, Betericus, Bliviaricus, Brandericus, Censerigus, Iensericus, Coniaricus, Desterigus, Domerigo, Eburicus, Eimericus, Eirigu, Elperico, Engorigus, Ermericus, Fredericus, Fromaricus, Fruaricus, Gauderigus, Geserigus, Getericus, Gildaricus, Golfarico, Gomarigus, Guderigo, Guimarigus, Guiricus, Gulderigus, Gunderigus, Ilderigus, Ionarico, Iusterigo, Iuvericus, Leoderigus, Leoverigus, Magnaricus, Malaricus, Matericus, Modericus, Monderico, Nandaricus, Odericus, Onoricus, Osorico, Ausarigus, Pipericus, Quidericus, Rakericus, Reirigus, Rendericus, Restericus, Retericus, Romarigus, Rudericus, Savaricus, Sendericus, Seririgo, Sesericus, Sigericus, Sigunterigo, Soniaricus, Spanaricu, Spandaricus, Spoderigo, Teodericus, Trasaricus, Tructericus, Turpericus, Venetricus, Vendericus, Genitrigus, Viaricus, Victericus, Viliaricu, Vistraricus
- -racus (later -rago), PGmc *rakaz "straight": Savaracus, Teoderago
- -rote, PGmc *rōtaz "glad": Ermerote
- -sendus, -sindus, PGmc *senþaz "companion" or *swenþaz "strong": Adelasindo, Adesindus, Andosindus, Ardesendus, Argesindus, Arosindus, Auresindus, Ausendus, Badosindus, Bagesindus, Becosindo, Baldesindo, Baudesindus, Berosindus, Bonesindus, Eisindus, Eldesindus, Ermosindus, Evosindo, Floresindus, Fortesindus, Fredosindus, Froisendus, Fromosindus, Gaudesindo, Geodesindus, Gitesindus, Gomesindo, Gotesendus, Gudesindus, Guisindus, Gundesindus, Leodesindo, Leovesindus, Manosindus, Marcosendus, Onesindus, Quedesendo, Kedesendo, Radesindus, Ragesindus, Ranosindus, Recesindus, Remesindus, Rudesindus, Segesindo, Spanosendo, Storesindo, Teodesindus, Trasendus, Tructesindus, Villisendo, Vistresindus, Zendasindo
- -scalcus, PGmc *skalkaz "servant": Gundiscalcus
- -suendo, -suindo, PGmc *swenþaz "strong": Reccesuindus
- -teus, -deus, -dius, PGmc *þewaz "servant": Ansedeus, Arnadius, Engladius, Filisteus, Gudesteus
- -ualdus, -aldus, -gualdus, -allo, PGmc *waldaz "ruler, mighty": Ansuallo, Anualdus, Ardaldus, Arnaldus, Arualdus, Astualdu, Avaldus, Barvaldus, Bernaldus, Bidualdus, Ensaldus, Ermaldus, Fredoaldus, Fromaldus, Giraldus, Gomaldo, Gontualdo, Grimaldus, Guantaldus, Leovaldo, Manualdus, Mirualdo, Otualdo, Ranualdus, Recualdus, Reginaldus, Servaldus, Sisualdo, Trasoldi, Vidraldus, Visaldus
- -uarius, -oarius, PGmc *warjaz "inhabitant, defender": Alduarius, Ansuario, Astruario, Freduarius, Oduarius, Osoarius, Randuarius, Trasuarius, Vistravarius
- -oindus, PGmc *wendaz "wind": Aloindo, Eindu, Fredoindus
- -oynus, PGmc *weniz "friend": Odoynus
- -uerco, related to PGmc *werkan "work": Aliverko, Eldivercus
- -uigio, -uigus, PGmc *wīgaz "fighter": Audugus, Baldoigius, Eldoigius, Ermoygius, Eroigius, Erigio, Guntigio, Leodeuigus, Mervigius, Rodougus, Viligus, Vistrevius
- -oytus, -vitus, probably related to PGmc *witōn "wise": Aldroitus, Aloitus, Argevitus, Senduitu, Sesuito
- -ulfus, -gulfus, PGmc *wulfaz "wolf": Adaulfus, Ataulfus, Agiulfus, Agrivulfum, Aliulfus, Andulfus, Ansiulphus, Anulfo, Ardulfus, Ariulfus, Arnulfo, Asarulfo, Asculfo, Asiulfus, Astrulfus, Astulfus, Aulfus, Berulfus, Betrulfus, Brandiulfus, Ebregulfus, Endulfus, Ermulfo, Eruulfus, Fardulfus, Fradiulfus, Fredulfus, Fregulfus, Frogiulfo, Gandulfo, Gardulfus, Gaulfus, Geodulfus, Gesulfus, Ierulfus, Gigulfo, Gomulfus, Gresulfo, Gudilulfo, Gundulfo, Ildulfus, Kendulfus, Leodulfus, Mandulfo, Maniulfus, Manulfus, Meitulfus, Nandulfo, Osdulfus, Quedulfus, Radulfus, Ragolfus, Randulfus, Ranulfus, Refulfo, Regaulfus, Sagulfus, Sendulfus, Seniulfus, Serulfus, Sisulfus, Teodulfus, Trastulfus, Trasulfus, Trudulfus, Tundulfus, Turisulfus, Uisulfus, Venariufi, Viliulfus
- -uldus, -guldus, PGmc *wulþuz "splendor": Arebuldo, Atauldus, Ebreguldus, Framuldo, Frineguldus, Fronuldo, Gebuldus, Itaultus, Senuldo, Sisuldus, Toduldo, Tumtuldo

Suffixes used to derive hypocoristic masculine names are:

- -eca, -ica (later -ega): Abrecan, Adica, Audeca, Begica, Egica, Elleca, Gagica, Segika
- -ila (later -ia): Adila, Andila, Anila, Ansila, Attila, Audila, Azilane, Badila, Baldila, Becilla, Bergila, Berila, Blandila, Brandila, Butila, Cixila, Crizila, Cutella, Dadila, Danila, Ducila, Egila, Agila, Emila, Ermila, Fafila, Fafia, Fagila, Fandila, Favila, Fradila, Framila, Frankila, Froila, Gandila, Gaudilani, Gavila, Gladila, Gramila, Guadla, Guandila, Gudila, Gulfila, Gumila, Gundila, Ikila, Itila, Iudila, Iustila, Iuvila, Keila, Kinquila, Ledla, Lubila, Magila, Manilla, Mantila, Martila, Massila, Mellilla, Merila, Mudila, Mugila, Mumila, Mundila, Naustila, Nuilla, Neufila, Nunnila, Ofila, Oila, Opila, Ossila, Quintila, Ramila, Riquila, Romila, Rudila, Sabila, Scarcila, Sigila, Sindila, Sunila, Tancila, Tegila, Teodila, Titila, Tuntila, Unilla, Vertila, Vidila, Vigila, Vincila, Visterla, Vitila, Vizila, Zisila
- -inus (later -ino): Addalinus, Aldinus, Bagino, Baltino, Baquino, Batinus, Berinus, Bertinus, Blandinus, Boninus, Brandinus, Cartinus, Crescino, Dadinus, Dalinus, Eldinus, Evorinus, Fandinus, Farino, Favino, Fofino, Fonsinus, Fruginus, Frauino, Gandinus, Gaudinas, Gavinus, Gentino, Gendinus, Golinus, Guginus, Gulfinus, Gultinus, Guntinus, Gutinus, Haginus, Hamdino, Iubinus, Karinus, Lallinus, Lelino, Lubinus, Mandinus, Maninus, Matlinus, Muginus, Mundinus, Nandinus, Naninus, Nunninus, Odinus, Audinus, Pantinus, Pappinus, Pennino, Pipinus, Quizino, Randinus, Recinus, Sandinus, Scerinus, Sedino, Sendinus, Sisinus, Spintino, Suffini, Tancinus, Tanino, Tatina, Tetina, Tegino, Teodinus, Tracinus, Tradinus, Tructinus, Trudinus, Uittina, Uittinus, Vandino, Goandinus, Vitinus, Zanino
- -linus, -llinus: Abbelino, Adolinus, Francolino, Gundelinus, Iovellinus
- -itus (later -ido): Cagitus, Carito, Crescitu, Donnitus, Froritum, Ganiti, Gegitus, Gogitus, Gumito, Guncitus, Iuvitus, Magitus, Magnitus, Manitus, Marcitus, Maxitus, Nannitus, Nonnitu, Papitus, Pegito, Pinnitus, Ragito, Sabitus, Sunitus, Sonnito, Tanitus, Atanitus, Tegitus, Trasido, Uegitus, Zanitus, Zazitus, Zenzitus
- -ellus (later -elo): Betellus, Felellus, Francellus, Froiellus, Frumellus, Gigelus, Gumellus, Guntellus, Gutellus, Hermellus, Lubellus, Mannello, Mantellus, Mirellus, Mundellus, Nonellus, Papellus, Recelli, Sendello, Sisellus, Trastelus, Truitellus, Uistrello, Visellu, Zanellus

Superlative and comparative suffixes were also used in forming personal names: -iza: Boniza, Wittiza -istaz: Ariastre, Belestrio, Fromesta, Remestro, Segestro

Other suffixes imply origin or relationship:

- -ingaz: Amingus, Bellengus, Gardingus
- -iskaz: Vandaliscus "Vandal" (male), Huniscus "Hun" (male)
- -iskō: Hunisco "Hun" (female)

== Toponyms ==
Many of these names are also toponyms (towns, parishes, villages, hamlets and fields), usually in the form of a Latin or Germanic genitive of the owner's name and sometimes preceded by the type of property (a Portuguese-Galician word of Latin, Germanic or pre-Latin origin) such as vila (villa, palace, estate), vilar (hamlet) castro (castle), casa (house), porta (pass, ford), agro (field), sa (Germanic sala; hall, house), busto (dairy), cabana (cabin), lama (pastures), fonte (well, spring), pena (fort), pomar (orchard) and vale (valley). This kind of name is present all over Northern Portugal:

b) Sigefredo (Siegfried = victorious peace), Gondomar (the first element means «sword»), Arganil (from hargis, army), Adães e Adufe (from hathus = fight); hildis (= fight) and Tagilde, etc.; Tresmonde, Trasmil, etc. from thras (= dispute); for Ermesinde and Esposende comes sinths (= military expedition). Also citing Antenor Nascentes pg. XXI of his "Dicionário Etimológico da Língua Portuguesa":

- Adães (Barcelos) to Athus= fight
- Aldão (Feira) to Aldonaci < Alds or Altheis
- Aldarete (Peso da Régua) to Alderedus
- Adaúfe (Braga) to Ulfe= wolf
- Aldreu (Barcelos) to Alde + reth < Alderedus
- Santiago de Ribeira de Alhariz (Valpaços) to Aliarici, genitive of Aliaricus
- Alvarenga (Aveiro) to Alfarr, from alfr ("elf") + herr ("army")
- Amonde (Viana do Castelo) to Monde= Protection
- Arganil (Coimbra) to Hargis= army
- Armamar (Viseu) to Mar= Horse
- Baltar (Paredes) to Baltarii, genitive of Baltharius
- Dume (Braga) to döm= church, cathedral
- Escariz (Arouca) to Rico= Lord
- Ermesinde (Valongo) to Sinde < sinth= military expedition
- Esmoriz (Aveiro) to Rico= Lord
- Esposende (Braga) to Sende= path
- Fafiães (Marco de Canaveses)
- Freamunde (Paços de Ferreira) to Mundis= protection
- Germunde (Aveiro) to Mundis= protection
- Gudim (Peso da Régua) to Suebian Goodwinn
- Gomesende to Gumesindi, genitive of Gumesindus
- Gondomar (Porto) to Gundemari, genitive of Gundemarus
- Gondim (Maia) to Guntini, genitive of Guntinus
- Guimarães to Vimaranis, to Weig-mar
- São Paio de Merelim (Braga) to Merelinus + uilla
- Mondariz to Munderici, genitive of Mundericus
- Mondim de Basto to Mundis + uilla
- Redufe (St. Emilião) to Ulfe= wolf
- Rendufe (Amares)
- Resende (Viseu) to Sende= path
- Roriz (St. Tirso) to Rico= Lord, noble
- Ruães (Braga) to Rodanis, toponymic
- Sandim (Vila Nova de Gaia) to Sande= truthful
- Sendim (Miranda do Douro) to Sende= path
- Tagilde (Vizela) to Hildis= combat, fight
- Tibães (Braga) to Tibianes < Tibianis(?)
- Trasmil to thras= dispute, skirmish
- Tresmonde (Ponte de Lima) to thras + mundis= skirmish-protection
- Trouxemil (Coimbra) to Miro= famous

Several thousand such toponyms are known in northern and central Portugal, Galicia, western Asturias and other territories which were part of the Suebi kingdom.

== Literature ==
=== Proto-Germanic reconstruction ===
- Orel, Vladimir (2003). Handbook of Germanic Etymology. Leiden: Brill, 2003. ISBN 978-90-04-12875-0.
- Köbler, Gerhard. (2007). Germanisches Wörterbuch. On-line .
- Kroonen, Guus. (2013). Etymological Dictionary of Proto-Germanic. Leiden: Brill, 2013. ISBN 978-9004183407.

=== Germanic personal names ===
- Förstemanm, Ernst (1900). Altdeutsches Namenbuch. P. Hanstein: Bonn, 1900.
- Fossner, Thorvald (1916). Continental-Germanic personal names in England in Old and Middle English times. Uppsala, 1916.
- Redin, Mats (1919). Studies on uncompounded personal names in old English. Uppsala, 1919.
- Schönfeld, M. (1911). Wörterbuch der Altgermanischen Personen und Völkernamen. Heidelberg, 1911.
- Searle, W. G. (1897). Onomasticon Anglo-Saxonicum. Cambridge: 1897.

=== Galician-Portuguese Medieval onomastics ===
- Rivas Quintas, Elixio (1991) Onomástica persoal do noroeste hispano. Alvarellos: Lugo, 1991. ISBN 84-85311-93-0.
- Boullón Agrelo, Ana I. (1999). Antroponimia medieval galega (ss. VIII-XII). Tübingen: Niemeyer, 1999. ISBN 978-3-484-55512-9.

=== Germanic toponymy in Galicia and Portugal ===
- Sachs, Georg (1932) Die germanischen Ortsnamen in Spanien und Portugal. Jena: Leipzig, 1932.
- Piel, J. (1933–1940) Os nomes germânicos na toponímia portuguesa. In Boletim Português de Filologia vol. II-VII: Lisboa.
- Lorenzo Vázquez, Ramón (1992). Joseph M. Piel (Thesis). hdl:10347/4870.

==== Forenames ====
- Rodrigo= from Germanic Hrodric/Hrēðrīc/Rørik/Hrœrekr (Roderick, Rodrick, Roderich; a compound of hrod 'renown' + ric 'power(ful)'), from the Proto-Germanic *Hrōþirīk(i)az; it was borne by the last of the Visigoth kings and is one of the most common Lusophone personal names of Germanic origin.[]

==== Surnames ====
- Araújo, Araujo= toponymic, from Gothic 'Ruderic'
- (van) Zeller, VanZeller= Originally Flemish "Zellaer", in Portugal since the 13th century. From Germanic 'kellā̌ri',< Lat. 'cellārium' (cellar)

== Arabic ==
Between the 8th and mid 13th centuries, most of Portugal was occupied and under the influence of the Islamic Emirate of Cordoba known as (Al-Andalus). During that period, although the local populations continued to speak Western Romance, and further south Mozarabic dialects; Arabic being the elite language, lent new words to Portuguese, thanks to a rich cultural and scientific legacy left in the Iberian Peninsula and the Western world in the Middle Ages.

=== List of Portuguese words of Arabic origin ===
- alvenarias (al-binaa) البناء

== See also ==
- History of the Portuguese language
- Differences between Spanish and Portuguese
- List of Brazil state name etymologies
- Portuguese exonyms
- Portuguese language
- Portuguese names
  - List of most common surnames (See Brazil and Portugal)
- List of French words of Germanic origin
- List of Galician words of Germanic origin
- Germanic personal names in Galicia#Germanic toponymy in Galicia and Portugal
- List of Portuguese words of Italian origin
- Germanic names in Italy, similar developments
