= Alderete =

- Place of origin: Spain

Alderete is a surname. Notable people with the surname include:

- Bernardo de Alderete (1565–1645), Spanish writer
- Elías Alderete (born 1995), Argentine footballer
- Jerónimo de Alderete (c. 1518–1556), Spanish conquistador
- Jorge Alderete (born 1971), Argentine illustrator
- Juan Alderete (born 1963), Mexican-American musician
- Juan Carlos Alderete (born 1952), Argentine trade unionist and politician
- Martín Carrillo Alderete (died 1653), Roman Catholic prelate
- Reinaldo Alderete (born 1983), Argentine footballer
- Terry Alderete (1945–2013), American businesswoman

== See also ==
- Alderetes, city in the Cruz Alta Department, Tucumán Province, Argentina
