= Roriz =

Roriz may refer to:

- Roriz (Barcelos), a parish in the municipality of Barcelos, Portugal
- Roriz (Chaves), a parish in the municipality of Chaves, Portugal
- Roriz (Santo Tirso), a parish in the municipality of Santo Tirso, Portugal
- João Pedro Roriz, a Brazilian actor and writer
- Aydano Antonio Freitas Roriz (*1949), Brazilian writer and editor
- Joaquim Roriz (c. 1936–2018), Brazilian politician
