= Bandar Gurdim =

Bandar Gurdim بندر گورديم
- Village
- Location within Iran
- Coordinates: 25°21′38″N 60°07′21″E
- Country: Iran
- Province: Sistan and Baluchestan
- County: Konarak
- Bakhsh: Central
- Rural District: Kahir

Population (2006)
  - Total: 127
- Time zone: UTC+3:30 (IRST)
  - Summer (DST): UTC+4:30 (IRDT)

bandar Gurdim (Persian: بندر گورديم, also Romanized as Gūrdīm; also known as Gordīm, Gūdīm, and Kūrdīm) is a village in Kahir Rural District, in the Central District of Konarak County, Sistan and Baluchestan Province, Iran. At the 2006 census, its population was 127, in 20 families. fa:بندر گوردیم
