= Aldão =

- Civil parish
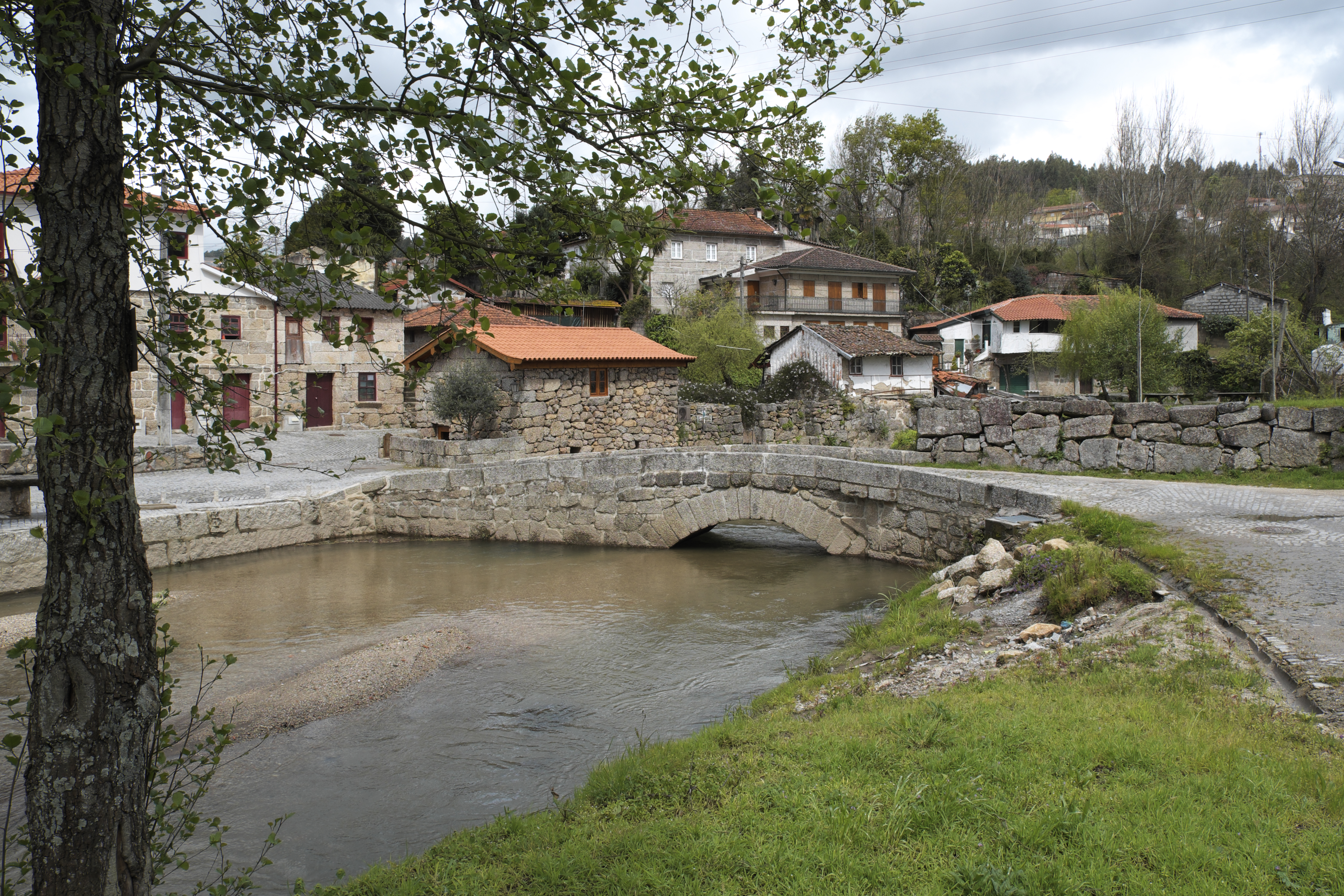
- Aldão in 2016

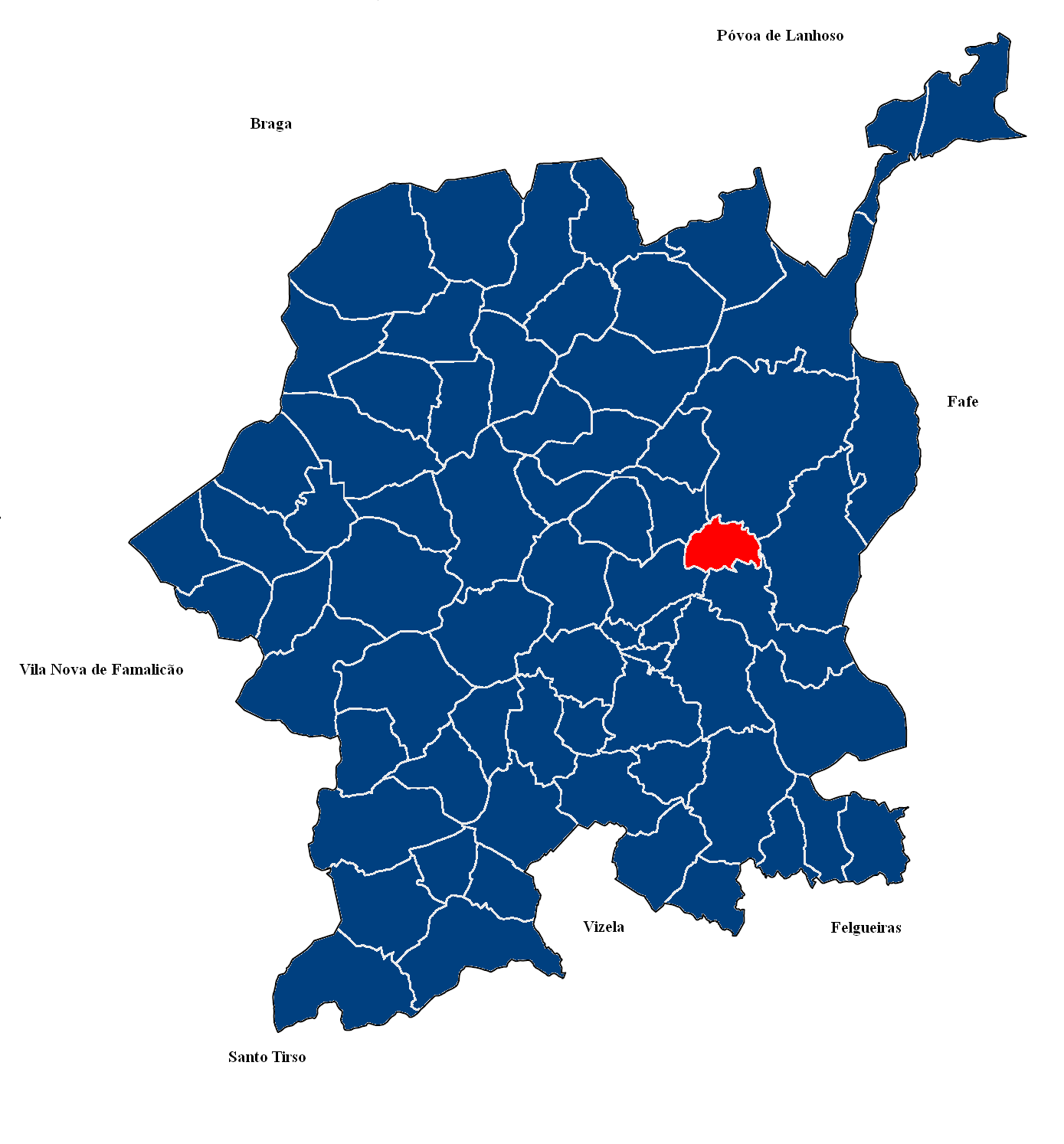
- Coordinates: 41.464°N 8.273°W
- Country: Portugal
- Region: Norte
- Intermunic. comm.: Ave
- District: Braga
- Municipality: Guimarães

Area
  - Total: 1.55 km^{2} (0.60 sq mi)

Population (2021)
  - Total: 1,278
  - Density: 825/km^{2} (2,140/sq mi)
- Time zone: UTC+00:00 (WET)
  - Summer (DST): UTC+01:00 (WEST)

Aldão is a civil parish in the municipality of Guimarães in the Braga District of Portugal.

== Demographics ==
The population in 2021 was 1,278, in an area of 1.55 km^{2}.
