= Bernardo de Alderete =

Spanish erudite and writer

Bernardo de Alderete (1565–1641) was a Spanish philologist and historian.

== Biography ==
De Alderete was born in Málaga. He was canon of the cathedral of Cordoba and one of the most learned men of his time. He was well versed in the Chaldean, Arabic, Hebrew, Greek, Latin, French and Italian languages. He applied his scholarly knowledge to archaeological and linguistic research. His main work is Del origen y principio de la lengua castellana o romance que hoy se uso en España, published in Rome in 1606. It is a scientific essay on the origins of the Spanish language in which the author highlights those of a Latin nature. He further wrote several antiquities from Spain, Africa and other provinces (1614) and a collection of Letters on the Eucharist.

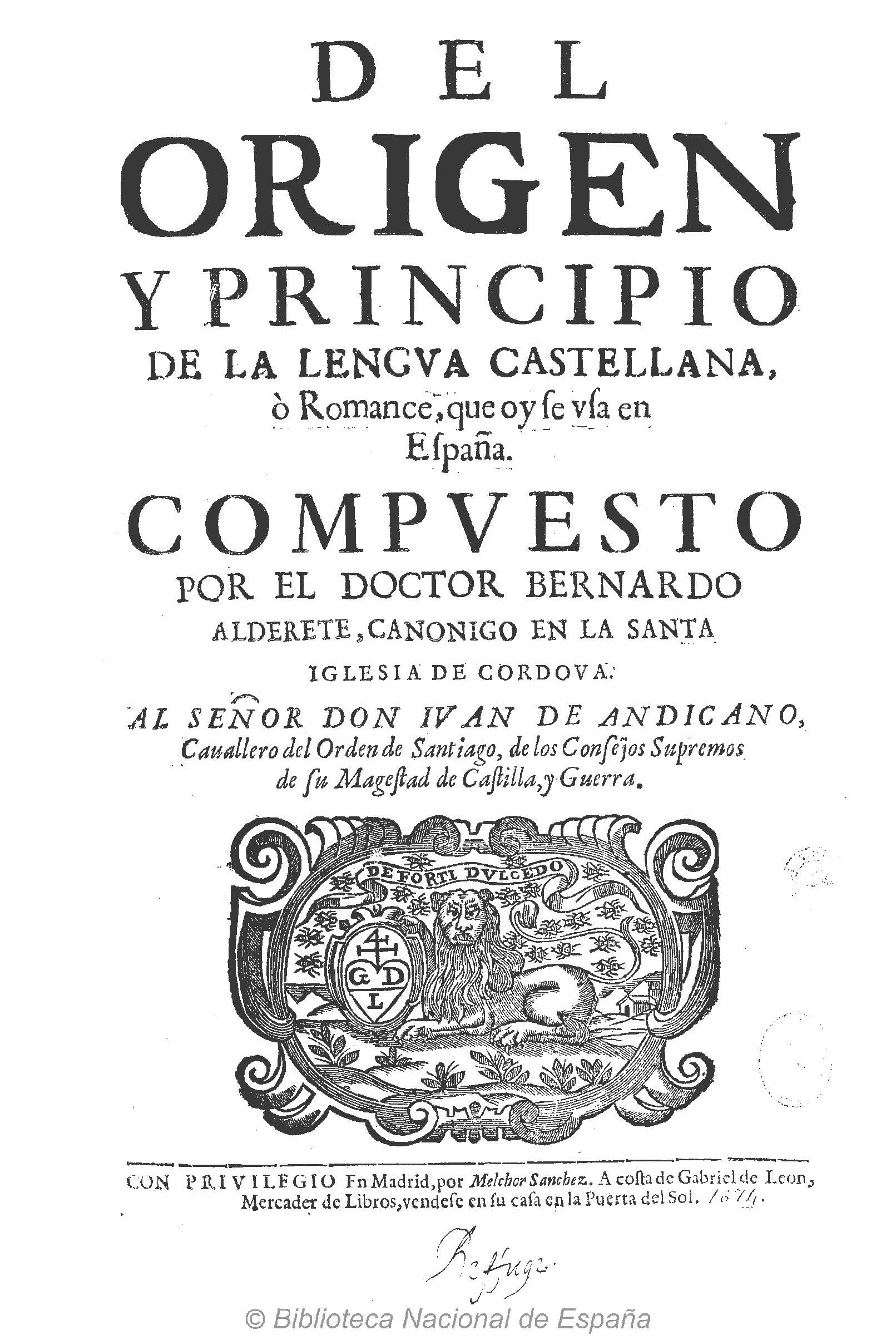

== Works ==
- Del origen y principio de la lengua castellana o romance que hoy se uso en España (Rome, 1606). Google Books
