= Aydano Roriz =

Brazilian writer and editor (born 1949)

Aydano Antonio Freitas Roriz (born Juazeiro, Bahia, June 6, 1949) is a Brazilian writer and editor.

== Biography ==
Aydano Roriz is the son of Lamartine de Sá Roriz and Avelice Freitas Roriz.

He took his first job at the age of 18 at Mangal Inc., a cotton mill belonging to his father. In the 1970s, while still a university student, he started his first business, a disco in Salvador, Bahia, Brazil.

After graduating with a degree in economics, he quit the entertainment business and embarked on a career with Abril Publishing. At Abril's head office in São Paulo, he was eventually appointed to be editor-in-chief of several magazines, including Playboy, Cosmopolitan, Quatro Rodas, Claudia and Capricho.

In 1986, he left Abril Group in order to start his own publishing house, Editora Europa. Today, Editora Europa publishes fifteen monthly titles, and is one of the top-ten magazine and book publishing companies in Brazil in terms of revenue.

His debut as a novelist was the historical romance Diamonds are Forgiving, published in Brazil in its Portuguese version in 1998, and in the United States in 1999 as an English-language translation. Since then, he has published a series of historical novels, The Hope of Portugal (2002), The First Governor (2003), The Heretics in the New World (2004), Van Dorth (2006), New Lusitania (2007) and The War of the Heretics (2010). (See the listing below for full details concerning publication dates, venues and translations.).

Roriz writes from his apartment in Funchal on the Portuguese island of Madeira.

== Author's works ==
- Diamonds Are Forgiving (Os Diamantes não são Eternos, 1998 – Brazil; 1999 – USA (in English translation); 2008 – Portugal; 2012 – English-language e-book)
- The Hope of Portugal (O Desejado, 2002 - Brazil; 2003 – Portugal)
- The First Governor (O Fundador, 2003 – Brazil; 2004 – Portugal)
- The Heretics in the New World (O Livro dos Hereges, 2004 – Brazil; 2006 – Portugal; 2012 – English-language e-book))
- Van Dorth (Van Dorth, 2006 – Brazil; O Livro dos Hereges a Reconquista do Brasil, 2007 – Portugal)
- New Lusitania (Nova Lusitânia, 2007 – Portugal; 2008 – Brazil)
- The War of the Heretics (A Guerra dos Hereges, 2010 – Brazil)

== See also ==
- List of Brazilian writers
- List of novelists
- List of people from São Paulo
