= Britonia =

Early medieval bishopric in Iberia

Diocese of Britonia
- The parish church of Santa María de Bretoña, traditionally regarded as the centre of the see

Location
- Country: Kingdom of the Suebi; Visigothic Kingdom
- Territory: Northern province of Lugo and western Asturias
- Ecclesiastical province: Lugo (6th century)

Information
- Established: Before 572
- Dissolved: After 675

Britonia was the name of a bishopric in the former Roman province of Gallaecia in north-west Iberia, and is used by modern historians in reference to an early medieval settlement of Britons in the same area. The settlement, often described as a southern counterpart to Brittany, formed part of the wider British diaspora of the fifth and sixth centuries. There is contemporary evidence of the settlement itself being called Britonia: in the medieval sources that survive, the name denotes the diocese and on occasion a place. The see is recorded in the Parochiale Suevorum, a list of the bishoprics of the Kingdom of the Suebi compiled in the second half of the sixth century, as the 'see of the Britons', to which belonged the churches of the Britons, the monastery of Maximus and churches in Asturias.

Five of the see's clergy can be identified with confidence from the acts of church councils held between 572 and 675: its bishops, Mailoc, Metopius, Sonna and Bela, and the priest Mactericus, who represented Sonna at the Eighth Council of Toledo in 653. Mailoc, who subscribed the acts of the Second Council of Braga in 572, bore a Brittonic name, but the linguistic affiliation of most of his successors' names remain disputed. The change in the see's designation, from a bishop 'of the Britons' to a bishop of the 'church of Britonia', has been read as evidence that an ethnic bishopric serving the Britons became a conventional territorial diocese at some point between 572 and 633. Historians have also disagreed over whether the church preserved customs of the so-called 'Celtic' church, particularly the form of tonsure worn by lectors in Gallaecia and condemned by the Fourth Council of Toledo in 633.

No representative of the see is recorded after 675. The traditional view that it was destroyed during the Muslim conquest of the early eighth century, but it has also been argued that the diocese either disappeared or changed its name in the late seventh century. Its territory is generally thought to have lain at least partly within the later diocese of Mondoñedo, while its Asturian churches passed to Oviedo. The name appears in later forgeries produced at Oviedo, in which Britonia served as a cipher for Mondoñedo, while 'Britonia' survives in the name of the parish of Santa María de Bretoña in the province of Lugo, traditionally regarded as the centre of the see. Britonia is now a titular see of the Catholic Church.

== Sources ==
The documentary evidence for Britonia is slight, comprising the entry for the see in the Parochiale Suevorum; the subscriptions of its bishops, or of their representative, to the acts of councils held at Braga and Toledo between 572 and 675; and a body of later charters, conciliar acts and lists of sees, many of them forged or interpolated, in which the see's name recurs between the ninth and twelfth centuries. To these may be added the results of excavations at Bretoña in 1970 and 1971.

== Name ==
The name Britonia is a modern scholarly label: there is no proof that contemporaries ever used it for the settlement, and in the medieval documents that survive it refers to the short-lived diocese, which historians often call the ecclesia Britoniensis, or occasionally to places. In the sixth century the see was defined by the people it served. The Parochiale assigns churches ad sedem Britonorum 'to the see of the Britons' (for which some manuscripts read Britoniorum, Britanorum, sedem Bretonicam or sedem Bretunicam), and the manuscripts of the Second Council of Braga describe Mailoc either as bishop of the Britonensis ecclesia or, in readings such as britunorum and brittanorum, as bishop 'of the Britons'. Simon Young preferred the latter reading, which is supported by the Parochiale and echoes the title of an earlier 'bishop of the Britons' in Gaul, (Note: Mansuetus, who appears among the bishops at the Council of Tours in 461 as episcopus Britannorum, is usually taken to be the first recorded Breton.) and explained 'bishop of Britonia' as an extrapolation from the usage of later councils. In the seventh century the see's bishops subscribed as bishops of the ecclesia Britaniensis, Brittaniensis or Britanensis. Antonio García y García read the change as marking the passage from a personal church, defined by ethnicity, to a territorial church with a fixed seat. According to Young, the earlier, ethnic designation is also "our firmest proof that the diocese of Britonia and the settlement Britonia are, indeed, related": without it, it could be argued that the see took its name from one of the many place-names in the north-west containing the element Brit- or Bret-, and had no connection with the British migration. As a noun, Britonia or Britona is attested only from the ninth century.

== Origins ==
A map of British migrations in the early medieval period.

Britonia was part of the wider British diaspora of the fifth and sixth centuries, and is often understood as a southern counterpart to Brittany. The origins of the settlers are obscure. No place-names, inscriptions or record of their language survive to indicate their provenance, although it is clear that they were orthodox members of the Church, or became so soon after their arrival. Louis Duchesne placed their arrival at the end of the fifth century or the beginning of the sixth, a chronology that García y García accepted. He argued that the church of the Britons established and organised itself in the century between the end of Hydatius' chronicle in 469 and the conversion of the Suebi to Catholicism around 559, a period in which almost nothing is known of the Galician church. He also thought it possible that Britons had reached Gallaecia earlier, whether to take charge of the property of the Galician followers of Priscillian confiscated by Magnus Maximus in the 380s or, as he suspected without direct evidence, in support of the Catholic population against the Suebi in the 430s.

Whether the migrants came from Britain itself or from Brittany is uncertain. Pierre David argued firmly for Brittany, while E. A. Thompson held that the question could not be settled on the available evidence, and García y García agreed that no document favours either possibility. Nora K. Chadwick, who associated the Galician settlement with the migration to Brittany, left open whether its church had been founded from Ireland, from Britain or from Brittany. She did, however, establish from Kenneth Jackson that Mailoc's name represents the Celtic Maglacos, and traced the form Maeloc to a document from Bodmin in Cornwall, which Harold Livermore regarded as at least an indication that the Britons may have come from the West Country.

Livermore questioned whether the Britons of Gallaecia need be connected with the settlement of Brittany at all. He observed that none of the see's later bishops bore a Celtic name, as Chadwick had noted, and that neither place-names nor any other evidence preserves a trace of the Celtic saints who attest the continuing association between Britain and Brittany; the incorporation of the monastery of Maximus seemed to him more likely to mark the end of a Celtic tradition than a renewal of the kind that took place in Brittany. Now doubting his earlier view that the Britons were unlikely to have reached Gallaecia before Armorica, or within the period covered by Orosius and Hydatius, he noted that the Britons were probably poor peasants or soldiers, which might explain their absence from the chronicle of Hydatius, who was chiefly concerned with the security of the cities and the landowners. He looked in particular to British troops in Roman service in the early fifth century. The army that the usurper Constantine III sent into Spain under his son Constans included, he believed, a British contingent, and a letter of the emperor Honorius, preserved at the monastery of Roda and perhaps issued at Rome in 416, rewarded Britons among the troops serving in Spain. This, Livermore noted, is the first occasion on which a force of Britons is found to have been rewarded so far south, but he left open whether they were the ancestors of the Britons of Gallaecia.

== Location ==
Except for that of the monastic see of Dumio, the entry for the see of the Britons is the only one in the Parochiale that names no individual churches. It assigns to the see ecclesias que sunt intro Britones una cum monasterio Maximi et que in Asturiis sunt 'the churches that are among the Britons, together with the monastery of Maximus, and those that are in Asturias'; four manuscripts omit the reference to Asturias. On this basis García y García placed the settlement in the northern part of the modern province of Lugo and in western Asturias. Livermore located the Britons between Ferrol and the river Eo, and noted that some versions of the Parochiale add usque in flumen Ovae 'as far as the river Ova'. The see lay within the ecclesiastical province of Lugo, and probably bordered the dioceses of Lugo and Astorga. Young cautioned that its exact location is unknown, but noted a consensus, going back to Enrique Flórez, that at least part of it coincided with the later diocese of Mondoñedo, now Mondoñedo-Ferrol. (Note: The name Britonia is also found in medieval documents for a territorio near Pontedeume, in the north-east of the modern province of A Coruña.)

=== Bretoña ===
The traditional centre of the see is the parish of Santa María de Bretoña, in the municipality of A Pastoriza in the north of the province of Lugo. García y García considered it beyond doubt that the see, once it had become a territorial diocese, was seated at Britonia or Britona, the modern Bretoña, and Livermore located the see's central monastery, the monastery of Maximus, there. Excavations carried out by Manuel Chamoso Lamas in 1970 and 1971 found, on the site of a double-ditched hillfort (castro), the apse of a church surrounded by burials of the Visigothic period, together with the remains of adjoining buildings that may have housed a monastic community. Chamoso attributed these remains to the British occupation and the creation of the see, which he regarded as an important residential see that survived until the eighth century and was then replaced by San Martiño de Mondoñedo, in his view the former monastery of Maximus. García y García accepted the importance of the finds, and did not think the identification of the monastery of Maximus with San Martiño unfounded in principle, but he knew of no source that supported it, and rejected Gildas Bernier's argument for it from the architecture of the church there.

The present parish church of Bretoña dates from the eighteenth century. Its east wall bears a damaged inscription recording the dedication of a church to Santa María, which Bernier dated to the ninth century and García y García to the eleventh or twelfth; its last line, which is difficult to read, may indicate that the church adjoined a monastic community (ad fratres). Bretoña had belonged to the diocese of Mondoñedo since the early Middle Ages, and the record of one of two canonical visitations of the parish made from Mondoñedo in the fourteenth and fifteenth centuries shows that its priest owned, besides the usual liturgical books, a manuscript of the customs of the 'black monks'. García y García noted that by that date the phrase denoted monks of Benedictine descent, and that any connection with the church's original monastic character is unknown.

== The sixth-century see ==
=== The Parochiale Suevorum ===
The Parochiale Suevorum lists the sees of the Suevic kingdom and the churches dependent on each. García y García associated it with a council held at Lugo in 569. Its date is disputed, David placing it between 561 and 572 and Claude W. Barlow, the editor of the works of Martin of Braga, between 572 and 582, but it certainly belongs to the second half of the sixth century. The see of the Britons stands last in the list. David interpreted its entry as describing a monastic bishopric, in which an abbot-bishop resident in the monastery of Maximus exercised authority over the churches of the Britons and of Asturias, an arrangement he regarded as characteristically Celtic. Thompson thought this "overstated": in his view the church was Celtic in origin but by 569 had already adopted, or was adopting, the diocesan organisation of the rest of the kingdom, although he conceded that the entry remained obscure, and that its failure to name the churches might indicate something distinctive about the see. Alberto Ferreiro wrote that, while no one seriously disputed the Celtic origins of Britonia, it was generally agreed that its church had adapted quite rapidly to the Roman episcopal and diocesan system. García y García inferred from the entry that the Britons had settled, probably peacefully, in a thinly populated district that may still have been largely pagan, and that the pastoral care of their bishops extended to the native population as well as to the immigrants.

Nothing is known of the Maximus after whom the monastery was named, or of whether he was its founder, owner or dedicatee. The reading monasterium maximum 'the great monastery', which would remove the difficulty, is without foundation. Some writers have taken Maximus to be a Latin rendering of Mailoc, whose name has been said to correspond loosely to it in meaning; (Note: García y García glossed the name Mailoc as 'great', while Young renders it 'princely one'.) Young found no proof of the identification, and suggested that its popularity in Galicia might be due to the survival there of an "outdated idea of the 'Celtic Church'", in which a bishop should reside in a monastery. Livermore could not entirely exclude the possibility that the monastery was named after Maximus, the usurper whom the general Gerontius proclaimed emperor and who later took refuge among the Vandals, perhaps while they were in the region of Lugo, though he thought it unlikely.

=== Mailoc ===
The first bishop of the see whose name is known with certainty is Mailoc, who subscribed the acts of the Second Council of Braga in 572 as Mahiloc Britonensis ecclesiae episcopus hic gestis subscripsi 'I, Mahiloc, bishop of the Britonian church, have subscribed these acts'. His name is recorded in several forms, including Mahiloc, Mahiloch, Mialoch, Mayloc and Maylocus, and has been universally regarded as Brittonic. (Note: Young suggested that Brittonic names would have been unfamiliar to scribes in the Peninsula, and contrasted the many variants of Mailoc's name with a common north-western name such as Andreas, subscribed at the same council, which passed through the manuscript tradition unchanged.) He signed last of the twelve bishops present, and last of the six from the province of Lugo, whose subscriptions were introduced with the words Item, ex concilio Lucensi 'likewise, from the council of Lugo'. Since precedence at Hispanic councils usually reflected seniority, Young inferred that Mailoc had either been consecrated recently or was regarded as a "second-class bishop" and placed last as a matter of course.

David proposed identifying Mailoc with Maliosus, who subscribed last at the First Council of Braga in 561, the acts of which record the names of the bishops but not their sees. The identification has been followed by García y García, Livermore and Ferreiro, but Antonio Tovar doubted it and others have been more cautious. Young noted that the variant forms of Maliosus in the manuscripts suggest a name unfamiliar to scribes, but that it would be difficult to reconcile his last place in 561 with Mailoc's last place a decade later, unless the bishop of the Britons was automatically placed last. Other identifications, with the Maximus of the Parochiale and with a Welsh saint of the same name whom Sabine Baring-Gould assigned to the sixth century, rest on no firm evidence, and Young concluded that only the reference of 572 is certain.

In modern Galicia Mailoc has become emblematic of the British settlement, and is commemorated in the names of streets and shops, in works of local history and in an album of Galician folk music. Young warned that his modern prestige had encouraged claims unsupported by the evidence, and noted that nothing in the sources indicates that Mailoc led the migration or that he was the see's first bishop.

=== From ethnic bishopric to diocese ===
Mailoc's episcopate coincided with the reforms of Martin of Braga, under whose leadership the practice of the Suebian church was being made uniform. One canon of the Second Council of Braga gave the metropolitan the right to announce the date of Easter to his suffragans; García y García noted that this might be connected with the differences between the Gallic and Hispanic reckoning of Easter reported by Gregory of Tours in 577, but might equally reflect the wider disagreement over Easter in the West. Young suggested that such standardisation "may have been painful for a church with distinctive traditions", and that a canon transferring the choice of bishops from their congregations to the bishops of the province might have been perceived by the Britons as a threat to their autonomy.

Young argued that the evidence of the Parochiale and of the manuscripts of the Second Council of Braga points to a change in the name of the see, and quite possibly in its nature, between 572 and 633. This, he suggested, was a transition not so much from a "Celtic" to a "Roman" organisation, in Ferreiro's terms, as from an "ethnic bishopric", whose bishop had charge of the Britons wherever they lived in the Suebian kingdom, or at least in the province of Lugo, to a conventional territorial diocese corresponding broadly to the modern diocese of Mondoñedo-Ferrol. García y García similarly described the church as passing from a personal to a territorial church, which kept for a time characteristics typical of their original British practices before being made uniformly part of the church of the rest of Iberia; he considered that the conversion of the Visigothic king Reccared to Catholicism in 589, after the Visigoths had annexed the Suebian kingdom, undoubtedly facilitated its absorption.

== The seventh-century diocese ==
=== Bishops ===
After 572 the see disappears from the record for sixty years. Young pointed out that only one council, the Third Council of Toledo in 589, took place in the interval, so that the see's absence need mean no more than that it had no bishop at the time, or that its bishop was unable or unwilling to attend. Metopius, bishop of the ecclesia Brittaniensis, subscribed the acts of the Fourth Council of Toledo in 633; his position, fiftieth of seventy-nine bishops, suggests that he had been consecrated about 630. No bishop of the see attended the Sixth Council of Toledo in 638, although the north-west was well represented there, perhaps because Metopius had died and his successor had not yet been consecrated. That successor, Sonna, subscribed the acts of the Seventh Council of Toledo in 646, and was probably consecrated in or shortly after 638. At the Eighth Council of Toledo in 653 the bishop of the see, whose name appears in the manuscripts as Sonnani, Sosani and in other forms, was represented by the priest Mactericus; since Flórez he has usually been identified with Sonna, an identification that Young thought plausible. (Note: Vives's edition reads Mactericus presbyter Sosani episcopi ecclesiae Britaniensis, with the variant Britolensis; the Colección Canónica Hispana reads Sonnani, and records Sosani, Sosanni, Sonnanis and Connnani as variants.) The last recorded bishop, Bela, attended the Third Council of Braga in 675. He signed fifth of eight bishops, which suggests that he had been consecrated after 668, and Young observed that if Sonna had been absent in 653 through a final illness or extreme old age, another, unrecorded bishop must have held the see between them. (Note: Young rejected four other names sometimes attached to the see: Mauloc, who appears in the purported acts of a council preserved at Oviedo that have all the signs of being a forgery, and whose name was almost certainly inspired by Mailoc's; Metonius, almost certainly a confusion with Metopius; Servo Deos, whom the sixteenth-century editor García de Loaysa assigned to Britonia but whom Flórez showed to have been bishop of Basti; and Zebedee, the father of Saint James, who according to a clearly legendary tradition was the see's first bishop in the first century.)

=== The bishops' names ===
The names of the seventh-century bishops are among the most controversial features of the see's history, since they bear on whether it remained in British hands or was taken over, in Young's phrase, by Visigothic or Galaeco-Roman "carpet-baggers". Most scholars accept that Mailoc's name is Brittonic and Sonna's Germanic; Sonna was a common name in the Peninsula, borne among others by an Arian bishop of Mérida. The others are more difficult. Thompson thought Metopius a Roman name, and suggested that if the others were Germanic their bearers were Suebi or Visigoths; García y García and Livermore likewise regarded Mailoc as the only bishop of the see with a Celtic name. Ferreiro, endorsing Thompson's suspicion that all or most of the names were Suevic or Visigothic, took the absence of Celtic names after 572 as further evidence of "the short-lived nature of any Celtic elements in Galicia". On the other side, Léon Fleuriot claimed all five names as Brittonic in 1980, and in the early 1960s Chadwick and Melville Richards, consulted by J. N. Hillgarth, thought that Bela might be British, Chadwick also wondering whether Mactericus might be Celtic.

Young criticised both schools. He found no evidence for Thompson's assumptions except in the case of Sonna, and saw in Ferreiro's restatement of them "the gradual process whereby suspicions harden to certainties without any intervening evidence"; but he judged Fleuriot's treatment "short and dilettante", its cognates mostly lacking or unconvincing. Young could find no parallel for Metopius in the prosopographies of the Roman Empire, nor any Germanic antecedent; the only other occurrence of the name appears to be an abbot commemorated on 20 September in the Mozarabic liturgy, conceivably the same man. Mactericus has no obvious Germanic or Latin root, while Bela, which lacks Germanic parallels and whose final -a sits awkwardly with a Latin origin, has been compared with the Brittonic Beli, though Young cautioned that the resemblance might be no more than coincidence. Comparing the names of the known bishops of the province of Lugo, and of their representatives, from the sixth century to the eighth, Young found only three (Bela, Mactericus and Vinicibilis of Iria) that have no obvious Greek, Latin, Hebrew or Germanic origin and are unattested elsewhere in the Peninsula in the early Middle Ages. Two of the three belong to Britonia, and Metopius would make a third if the abbot of the Mozarabic liturgy is the same man as the bishop. Young presented the comparison not as a serious survey of Galician onomastics but as a demonstration that two, and perhaps three, of the see's names had not yet been adequately explained.

=== Canon 41 of the Fourth Council of Toledo ===
Canon 41 of the Fourth Council of Toledo (633), which Metopius attended, required all clerics, including lectors, to shave the whole of the upper part of the head, leaving only a circular crown below. It condemned the practice of the lectors in the parts of Gallaecia, who wore their hair long like laymen and shaved only a small circle on the crown of the head (non sicut hucusque in Gallaeciae partibus facere lectores videntur, qui prolixis ut laici comis in solo capitis apice modicum circulum tondunt), a custom that the council described as having formerly been that of heretics in Spain. Since the tonsure was among the grounds on which the churches of Britain and Ireland were regarded as heretical, historians since Arthur West Haddan and William Stubbs have often connected the canon with the Britons of Gallaecia, and García y García thought that the tonsure it described did appear to reflect Celtic influence in parts of Galicia. Others saw in the canon a condemnation of Priscillianist or Arian practice.

Ferreiro challenged both interpretations in 1991. Surveying the Hispanic conciliar legislation on hair and the tonsure from the Second Council of Toledo in 527 onwards, he found that the canons of the councils of Braga, which Mailoc and Maliosus had attended, did not single out the churches of the Britons for correction, and that the Galician lectors of 633 were likened to laymen, not to heretics or to a divergent monastic tradition. Since the tonsure had never been an issue in the polemic against Priscillian, he regarded the charge of heresy as a rhetorical device for condemning practices that the council wished to suppress in the interest of uniformity throughout the Peninsula. He concluded that it was "farfetched" to regard the ecclesia Britoniensis as the channel through which Celtic tonsures reached the Galician church, and that their presence in Galicia could not be confirmed. Young found Ferreiro's position interesting, wondering whether anyone would have connected the canon with the Britons but for its reference to Gallaecia, but questioned his reading of the word lector, which, he suggested, might have been used disparagingly of the "half-priests" of the British church; he acknowledged that this was no more than a possibility, and that the use of lector in the opening sentence of the canon might tell against it.

=== Contacts with Britain and Ireland ===
Isidore of Seville also attended the Fourth Council of Toledo, and Young suggested that the Britons of Gallaecia, whether at the council or at other times, might have been one of the channels through which Isidore's works reached Britain and Ireland, although there is no proof of this and other routes, including transmission through Francia, are possible. Hillgarth, who had once regarded Britonia as a very probable route of transmission, later placed less weight on it. García y García likewise considered it plausible, though he could offer no conclusive proof, that the British monasteries of Galicia transmitted Galician and Visigothic writings to Celtic monasteries, citing the treatise De pascha, falsely attributed to Martin of Braga, which is found in ninth-century Irish manuscripts. Young accepted that the treatise is to be linked with the north-west of the Peninsula, though it is unlikely to be Martin's work.

== Disappearance ==
No representative of the see is recorded after Bela's appearance at Braga in 675. Historians have usually dated the end of the see to the Muslim conquest some forty years later, and García y García wrote of the destruction of Bretoña by Abd al-Aziz ibn Musa in 716, after which the see was never restored. Young argued that the evidence for this destruction is weak. It rests on traces of burning found by Chamoso Lamas beneath the modern church at Bretoña, which might be explained by other causes, such as the Viking and Asturian raids of the ninth and tenth centuries or lightning, and on a charter of 830 describing the destruction of the see, which is late and at least partly forged. He drew attention instead to the see's absence from all five of the subsequent councils of Toledo (the Twelfth to the Sixteenth), at four of which most of the bishops of the north-west were present, and concluded that the diocese had either disappeared or changed its name in the late seventh century.

The second possibility recalls a suggestion by Flórez that Brandila and Suniaguissius, bishops of Laniobria who attended the Thirteenth and Sixteenth Councils of Toledo in 683 and 693 were bishops of Britonia under another name. García y García could see no basis for the identification, but Young, who thought that Laniobria probably lay in the north-west, noted signs that Flórez's view was returning to favour.

== Later history ==
=== Oviedo and Mondoñedo ===
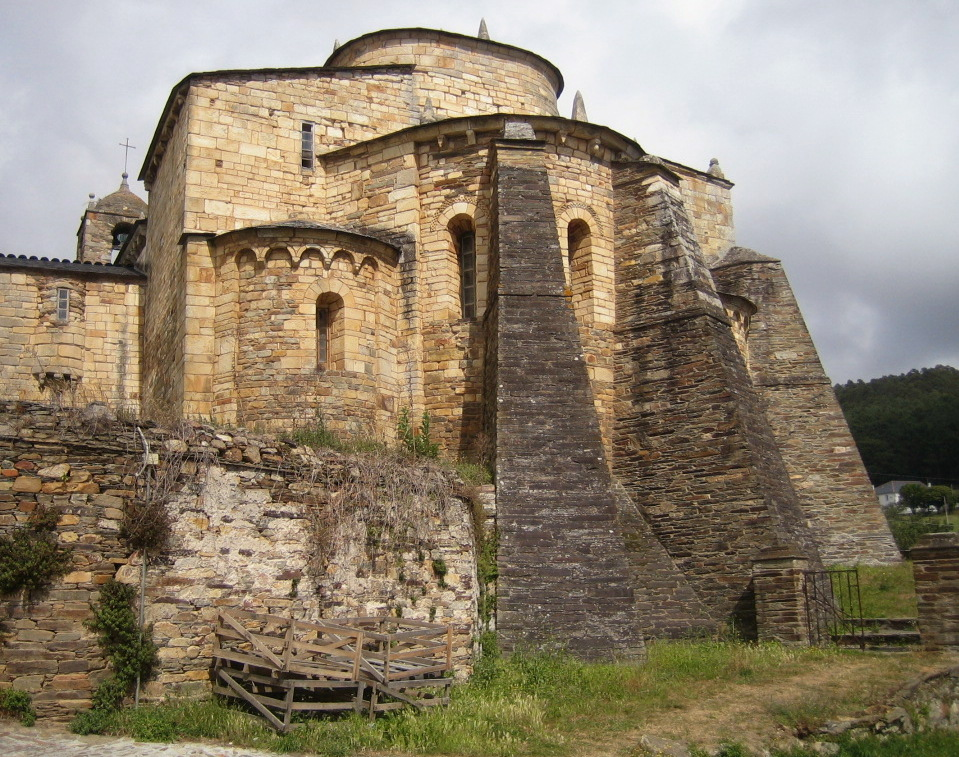
The basilica of San Martiño de Mondoñedo, seat of the see of Mondoñedo before its removal to the present town in the twelfth century

After the Muslim conquest the territory attributed to Britonia was divided between the sees of Oviedo and Mondoñedo, and the see itself was not restored. According to García y García, the diocese of Oviedo, created in the capital of the Asturian kingdom at the expense of the diocese of Astorga, could absorb only the Asturian churches of Britonia, while its Galician territory formed a new bishopric that eventually took the name of Mondoñedo. The see of Mondoñedo was later seated at San Martiño de Mondoñedo, from which it moved in the twelfth century to the present town of Mondoñedo, apart from a brief period at Ribadeo in 1182.

The name of Britonia was drawn into the rivalries of the successor sees. A royal charter dated 830 purports to make and confirm the church of Oviedo pro sede Britoniense, quae ab Ismaelitis est destructa et inhabitabilis facta 'in place of the Britonian see, which has been destroyed by the Ishmaelites and made uninhabitable', and a manuscript of the Parochiale transcribed by García de Loaysa ends with the words Ovetum, vel Britonia, exempta a Gallaeciae Bracara 'Oviedo, or Britonia, exempt from Braga of Gallaecia'. García y García regarded the charter as suspect, and attributed the identification of Oviedo with Britonia to a version devised at Lugo to curb Oviedo's metropolitan pretensions, according to which the bishop of Britonia had taken refuge at Oviedo when his see was destroyed and Oviedo had inherited his title. The forged councils of Oviedo associated with Bishop Pelayo (about 1100) further entangled the see in the disputes over Oviedo's territory and its exemption from Lugo and Braga. Young argued that in the documents of Oviedo Britonia served as a cipher for Mondoñedo, Oviedo's western neighbour, so that the extinct diocese had a "strange afterlife" as a virtual bishopric of the Asturian forgers. (Note: A late north-western document, perhaps of the twelfth century, states that since the Muslim invasion Dumio had been in manu Pontificum Britoniorum, quae est Sedes Menduniensium 'in the hands of the bishops of the Britons, which is the see of Mondoñedo'.)

=== Theodesindus ===
A bishop named Theodesindus, sometimes styled Britoniensis, appears in several documents of the later ninth century: charters of 857 and 896, an account of the consecration of the cathedral of Santiago de Compostela in 899, and the acts of a supposed council of Oviedo of about 900. García y García noted that he appears in the acts of an alleged council of Oviedo of 872 or 873 as distinct from the bishop of Oviedo, and in those of the council of 900 as bishop of both Dumio and Britonia, but regarded the councils of Oviedo as of very doubtful authenticity. Young argued that all the documents in which Theodesindus appears were written in, or influenced by, the scriptorium of Oviedo, which used forgery to justify its archiepiscopal ambitions and to disguise its recent origins. Since Theodesindus never appears alongside a bishop of Mondoñedo, Young concluded that Britonia in these documents stood for Mondoñedo, and that Theodesindus should be dismissed from the history of the see. The emendation of his name to Rudesindus, found in Joseph Loth and accepted by García y García, Young regarded as unnecessary: a nineteenth-century attempt to identify him with the contemporary bishop of Mondoñedo, Rosendo I (877–907).

=== Later lists and the Division of Wamba ===
The see continued to appear in lists as a dependency of Braga, in the forms Britona, Britonia and Britonacensis sedes, from 962 onwards. A privilege of Pope Callixtus II dated 20 June 1121, addressed to Archbishop Pelayo of Braga and confirming Paschal II's restoration of the metropolitan see, assigned to Braga as suffragans the sees of Astorga, Tui, Mondoñedo, Ourense, Porto and Coimbra and the episcopal cities of Viseu, Lamego, Idanha and Britonia; the same list, with the addition of Dumio and Iria, recurs in a claim put forward by Braga in 1186. García y García thought that Britonia was included not because it still functioned as a see, but in case it might one day be restored.

The eleventh- and twelfth-century forms of the name in all likelihood derive from recensions of the so-called Division of Wamba (Hitación de Wamba), which purports to fix the boundaries of the Hispanic dioceses and to have been issued by the Visigothic king Wamba at a council of Toledo in 675, but is a forgery of the eleventh or twelfth century by a cleric of Osma or Toledo. It assigns to Britonia boundaries that cannot now be identified, since the place-names are invented or corrupt (Britonia teneat de Busa usque Torrentes, de Coba usque Tobellam), Busa marking the boundary with Lugo and Torrentes that with Astorga. A privilege of Alfonso VII of 1156 still referred to the place as Britonia.

=== Later references to Britons ===
The settlement is usually said to have left behind, in Young's words, only "a handful of short notices and a single place name", Bretoña; Based on Leon Fleuriot's work, Young argued that it may have left further traces - around 15 toponyms including Bretona (A Pastoriza), Bertona (A Capela), Bretona (Barro), Bretonia (Sober), Breton (Ferrol), Bretun (Soria), Breton (Aviles), Bretios (Guntin), Bertos (De Paramo), Brito (Verin), Brito (Guimaraes), Bretal (Ribeira), Bretelo (Chadrexa de Quiexa), Britelo (Pontevedra), and Britelo (Mondim de Basto). He drew particular attention to a charter of 1233 from the monastery of Meira, concerning property at Lousada in the province of Lugo, which refers to hominibus illis qui vocabantur britones 'those men who were called britones'. Young thought the term likely to be connected with the British settlement, since the charter comes from the very region that the migrants had settled; the monastery's charters, however, remain unedited. (Note: Young also noted two references to Britons that had not been taken up by historians: a charter of 926 printed among the documents of Oviedo Cathedral, and a document from Tarouca in northern Portugal that he knew only from an unreferenced quotation by Johannes Hubschmid. Neither comes from Galicia, but both fall within the bounds of the former Roman province of Gallaecia.)

== List of bishops ==
Young identified five individuals who can reliably be said to have represented the see at the church councils of the sixth and seventh centuries: the bishops Mailoc, Metopius, Sonna and Bela, and the priest Mactericus. The approximate dates of the bishops' episcopates given below are those suggested by Young.

Bishop	Episcopate	Attestation
Mailoc	c. 560 – ?	Second Council of Braga, 572; possibly identical with Maliosus, First Council of Braga, 561
Metopius	c. 630 – c. 638	Fourth Council of Toledo, 633
Sonna	c. 638 – c. 655	Seventh Council of Toledo, 646; represented by the priest Mactericus at the Eighth Council of Toledo, 653
Bela	c. 668 – c. 681	Third Council of Braga, 675

== Titular see ==
In 1969 Britonia was revived as a titular see of the Catholic Church, under the Latin name Britoniensis. Its titular bishops have been:

- Eugene O'Callaghan (28 November 1969 – 26 January 1971)
- John Brewer (31 May 1971 – 17 November 1983)
- Edward Joseph O'Donnell (6 December 1983 – 8 November 1994)
- Paweł Cieślik (from 3 December 1994)

== Works cited ==
=== Primary sources ===
- Barlow, Claude W., ed. (1950). Martini episcopi Bracarensis opera omnia. Papers and Monographs of the American Academy in Rome (in Latin). Vol. 12. New Haven: Yale University Press. IA martiniepiscopib0000clau.
- Catalani, Giuseppe, ed. (1753). Collectio maxima conciliorum omnium Hispaniae et Novi Orbis (in Latin). Vol. 3 (2nd ed.). Rome: Antonio Fulgoni.
  ——, ed. (1754). Collectio maxima conciliorum omnium Hispaniae et Novi Orbis (in Latin). Vol. 4 (2nd ed.). Rome: Antonio Fulgoni.
- Férotin, Marius, ed. (1904). Le Liber Ordinum en usage dans l'église wisigothique et mozarabe d'Espagne du cinquième au onzième siècle. Monumenta Ecclesiae Liturgica (in French). Vol. 5. Paris.
- Fita, Fidel (1901). "Concilio ovetense del año ¿900? Texto inédito". Boletín de la Real Academia de la Historia (in Spanish). 38: 113–133. IA boletndelarealac38madr.
- Flórez, Enrique (1764). España Sagrada (in Spanish). Vol. 18: De las iglesias Britoniense y Dumiense, incluidas en la actual de Mondoñedo. Madrid: Antonio Marín.
- Floriano, Antonio C. (1949–1951). Diplomática española del período astur: estudio de las fuentes documentales del reino de Asturias (718–910) (in Spanish). Oviedo: Instituto de Estudios Asturianos.
- García Larragueta, Santos, ed. (1962). Colección de documentos de la catedral de Oviedo (in Spanish). Oviedo: Instituto de Estudios Asturianos. IA colleciondedocum0000sant.
- Glorie, François, ed. (1965). Itineraria et alia geographica. Corpus Christianorum Series Latina (in Latin). Vol. 175. Turnhout: Brepols.
- Haddan, Arthur West; Stubbs, William, eds. (1873). Councils and Ecclesiastical Documents relating to Great Britain and Ireland. Vol. II, Part I. Oxford: Clarendon Press. IA councilsecclesia0201hadd.
- Hernández, Francisco J. (1985). Los cartularios de Toledo: catálogo documental. Monumenta Ecclesiae Toletanae Historica, Series I: Regesta et Inventaria Historica (in Spanish). Vol. 1. Madrid: Fundación Ramón Areces. ISBN 8485942302.
- Krusch, Bruno; Levison, Wilhelm, eds. (1951). Gregorii episcopi Turonensis Libri historiarum X. Monumenta Germaniae Historica, Scriptores rerum Merovingicarum (in Latin). Vol. 1, part 1 (2nd ed.). Hanover: Hahn.
- Lacarra, José María (1945). "Textos navarros del Códice de Roda" (PDF). Estudios de Edad Media de la Corona de Aragón (in Spanish). 1: 193–283. Archived from the original (PDF) on 23 June 2013.
- Loaysa, García de, ed. (1593). Collectio conciliorum Hispaniae (in Latin). Madrid: Pedro Madrigal.
- Martínez Díez, Gonzalo; Rodríguez, Félix, eds. (1992). La colección canónica hispana. Monumenta Hispaniae Sacra, Serie canónica (in Spanish). Vol. V: Concilios hispanos: segunda parte. Madrid: Consejo Superior de Investigaciones Científicas, Instituto Enrique Flórez.
- Vives, José, ed. (1963). Concilios visigóticos e hispano-romanos. España cristiana, Textos (in Spanish). Vol. 1. Barcelona: Consejo Superior de Investigaciones Científicas, Instituto Enrique Flórez.

=== Secondary sources ===
- Balil, Alberto (1970). "La defensa de Hispania en el Bajo Imperio: amenaza exterior e inquietud interna". In Viñayo González, Antonio (ed.). Legio VII Gemina (in Spanish). León: Diputación Provincial de León. pp. 601–620.
- Baliñas Pérez, Carlos (1998). Gallegos del año mil. Galicia histórica (in Spanish). A Coruña: Fundación Pedro Barrié de la Maza. ISBN 8489748276.
- Baring-Gould, Sabine; Fisher, John (1911). The Lives of the British Saints. Vol. 3. London: Honourable Society of Cymmrodorion. IA livesofbritishsa03bariuoft.
- Bernier, Gildas (1982). Les chrétientés bretonnes continentales depuis les origines jusqu'au IXème siècle (PDF). Dossiers du Centre régional archéologique d'Alet (in French). Vol. E. Rennes.
- Chadwick, Henry (1976). Priscillian of Avila: The Occult and the Charismatic in the Early Church. Oxford: Clarendon Press. ISBN 019826643X. IA priscillianofavi0000chad.
- Chadwick, Nora K. (1965). "The Colonization of Brittany from Celtic Britain" (PDF). Proceedings of the British Academy. 51: 235–299.
  —— (1969). Early Brittany. Cardiff: University of Wales Press. ISBN 0900768266.
- Chamoso Lamas, Manuel (1975). "Avance informativo sobre las excavaciones arqueológicas realizadas en Bretoña (Lugo) durante las campañas de 1970 y 1971". Noticiario Arqueológico Hispánico. Prehistoria (in Spanish). 4. Madrid: 267–271.
- Cheney, David M. (n.d.). "Britonia (Titular See)". Catholic-Hierarchy.
- Chow, Gabriel (n.d.). "Titular Episcopal See of Bretoña, Spain". GCatholic.
- David, Pierre (1947). Études historiques sur la Galice et le Portugal du VIe au XIIe siècle. Collection portugaise (in French). Vol. 7. Lisbon: Livraria Portugália.
  —— (1950). "Saint Martin de Braga est-il l'auteur d'un traité de comput pascal?". Bulletin des Études Portugaises et de l'Institut Français au Portugal. New series (in French). 14: 283–289.
- Díaz y Díaz, Manuel C. (1995). "Notas sobre el distrito de Lugo en la época sueva" (PDF). Helmantica (in Spanish). 46: 227–242.
- Duchesne, Louis (1925). L'Église au VIe siècle (in French). Paris: E. de Boccard. hdl:2027/mdp.39015012209550.
- Fernández Alonso, Justo (1955). La cura pastoral en la España romanovisigoda. Publicaciones del Instituto Español de Historia Eclesiástica, Monografías (in Spanish). Vol. 2. Rome.
- Ferreiro, Alberto (1991). "A Reconsideration of Celtic Tonsures and the Ecclesia Britoniensis in the Hispano Roman-Visigothic Councils". Annuarium Historiae Conciliorum. 23: 1–10. doi:10.30965/25890433-0230102001.
- Fleuriot, Léon (1980). Les origines de la Bretagne: l'émigration. Bibliothèque historique (in French). Paris: Payot. ISBN 2228127116.
- Freire Camaniel, José (1998). El monacato gallego en la alta Edad Media. Galicia histórica (in Spanish). A Coruña: Fundación Pedro Barrié de la Maza. ISBN 8489748357.
- García Moreno, Luis A. (1974). Prosopografía del reino visigodo de Toledo. Acta Salmanticensia, Filosofía y Letras (in Spanish). Vol. 77. Salamanca: Universidad de Salamanca. ISBN 8460060187.
- García y García, Antonio (1978). "Dos visitas a Bretoña" [Two visitations of Bretoña]. Compostellanum (in Spanish). 23: 169–189.
  —— (1986). "Ecclesia Britoniensis" [The Church of Britonia]. Estudios Mindonienses (in Spanish). 2: 121–134.
- Hillgarth, J. N. (1961). "The East, Visigothic Spain and the Irish". Studia Patristica. 4: 442–456. IA studiapatristica0004flcr.
  —— (1962). "Visigothic Spain and Early Christian Ireland". Proceedings of the Royal Irish Academy, Section C. 62: 167–194. JSTOR 25505106.
  —— (1965). "Old Ireland and Visigothic Spain". In McNally, Robert (ed.). Old Ireland. Dublin: Gill. pp. 200–227. IA oldireland0000robe.
- Hubschmid, Johannes (1960). "Toponimia prerromana". In Alvar, Manuel; et al. (eds.). Enciclopedia lingüística hispánica (in Spanish). Vol. 1. Madrid: Consejo Superior de Investigaciones Científicas. pp. 447–493.
- Jackson, Kenneth (1953). Language and history in early Britain; a chronological survey of the Brittonic languages, first to twelfth century A.D. Edinburgh: Edinburgh University Press. IA languagehistoryi0000jack.
- James, Edward (1984). "Bede and the Tonsure Question". Peritia. 3: 85–98. doi:10.1484/J.PERI.3.58.
- Kampers, Gerd (1979). Personengeschichtliche Studien zum Westgotenreich in Spanien. Spanische Forschungen der Görresgesellschaft, Zweite Reihe (in German). Vol. 17. Münster: Aschendorff. ISBN 3402057980.
- King, P. D. (1972). Law and Society in the Visigothic Kingdom. Cambridge Studies in Medieval Life and Thought, Third Series. Vol. 5. Cambridge: Cambridge University Press. ISBN 0521084210. IA lawsocietyinvisi0000king.
- Livermore, Harold (1987). "The Britones of Galicia". Estudios Mindonienses. 3: 355–364.
- Loth, Joseph (1901). "[Notice of F. Fita, 'Concilio ovetense del año ¿900?']". Revue Celtique (in French). 22: 256. IA revueceltiqu22pari.
- Mansilla, Demetrio (1955a). "Disputas diocesanas entre Toledo, Braga y Compostela en los siglos XII al XV". Anthologica Annua (in Spanish). 3: 89–143. doi:10.59530/ANTHANN.1955.3.2.
  —— (1955b). "La supuesta metrópoli de Oviedo". Hispania Sacra (in Spanish). 8: 259–274.
- Mariño Veiras, Dolores (1983). Señorío de Santa María de Meira (de 1150 a 1525): espacio rural, régimen de propiedad y régimen de explotación en la Galicia medieval (in Spanish). La Coruña: Ediciones Nós.
- Martínez Díez, Gonzalo (1972). "Concilios nacionales y provinciales". In Aldea Vaquero, Quintín; Marín Martínez, Tomás; Vives Gatell, José (eds.). Diccionario de historia eclesiástica de España (in Spanish). Vol. 1. Madrid: Instituto Enrique Flórez, Consejo Superior de Investigaciones Científicas. pp. 537–577.
- Mayr-Harting, Henry (1972). The Coming of Christianity to Anglo-Saxon England. London: B. T. Batsford. ISBN 0713413603. IA comingofchristia0000mayr_z6c8.
- Orlandis, José; Ramos-Lissón, Domingo (1986). Historia de los concilios de la España romana y visigoda (in Spanish). Pamplona: Ediciones Universidad de Navarra. ISBN 843130927X.
- Richards, Melville (1972). "Mailoc". Habis. 3: 159. hdl:11441/28977.
- Sánchez-Albornoz, Claudio (1981). Estudios sobre Galicia en la temprana Edad Media. Galicia histórica (in Spanish). A Coruña: Fundación Pedro Barrié de la Maza. ISBN 8485728106.
- Sims-Williams, Patrick (1991). "The Emergence of Old Welsh, Cornish and Breton Orthography, 600–800: The Evidence of Archaic Old Welsh". Bulletin of the Board of Celtic Studies. 38: 20–86.
- Thomas, Charles (1998). Christian Celts: Messages and Images. Stroud: Tempus. ISBN 0752414119. IA christianceltsme0000thom.
- Thompson, E. A. (1968). "Britonia". In Barley, M. W.; Hanson, R. P. C. (eds.). Christianity in Britain, 300–700. Leicester: Leicester University Press. pp. 201–205. IA 10011369830-christianity-in-britain-300-700.
  —— (1969). The Goths in Spain. Oxford: Clarendon Press. IA gothsinspain0000eath.
- Tovar, Antonio (1972). "Un obispo con nombre británico y los orígenes de la diócesis de Mondoñedo". Habis (in Spanish). 3: 155–158.
- Vázquez de Parga, Luis (1943). La división de Wamba: contribución al estudio de la historia y geografía eclesiásticas de la Edad Media española (in Spanish). Madrid: Consejo Superior de Investigaciones Científicas, Instituto Jerónimo Zurita.
- Young, Simon (2001). "Note on Britones in Thirteenth-century Galicia". Studia Celtica. 35. Cardiff: University of Wales Press: 361–362.
  —— (2002). "Note: Iberian addenda to Fleuriot's Toponymes". Peritia. 16: 479–482. doi:10.1484/j.peri.3.506.
  —— (2003). "The Bishops of the Early Medieval Spanish Diocese of Britonia". Cambrian Medieval Celtic Studies. 45: 1–19.
- Yzquierdo Perrín, Ramón (2000). "Las catedrales de la diócesis de Mondoñedo en la Edad Media". In Recuero Astray, Manuel J.; Díez Platas, Fátima; Monterroso Montero, Juan (eds.). El legado cultural de la Iglesia mindoniense: I Congreso do Patrimonio Cultural da Diócese de Mondoñedo-Ferrol (in Spanish). A Coruña: Universidade da Coruña. pp. 103–163. hdl:2183/10974. ISBN 8495322463.
