= Iria Flavia =

Ancient settlement & titular see in Spain

Iria Flavia or simply Iria in Galicia, northwestern Spain, is an ancient settlement and former bishopric in the modern municipality of Padrón, which remains a Catholic titular see.

== History ==
Located at the confluence of the Sar and Ulla rivers, Iria was a port city, the main seat of the Celtic Capori tribe, on the road between Braga and Astorga. The Romans rebuilt the road as via XVIII or Via Nova and refounded the Gallaecian port as Iria Flavia ("Flavian Iria") to compliment Roman emperor Vespasian.

King Juan Carlos of Spain granted the illustrious resident and writer Camilo José Cela the title of Marqués de Iria Flavia.

== Ecclesiastical history ==
No later than 561, perhaps from 400 AD, Iria was the seat of a bishopric, also known in Latin as Locus Sancti Iacobi ('place of Saint James', in Spanish Santiago), that became a suffragan of the (Portuguese) Metropolitan of the Archdiocese of Braga and shared its seat with (Santiago de) Compostela, which developed into Iberia's major pilgrimage destination (rivalling Rome and Jerusalem) then moved there in 1095. The modern city on the site of Iria Flavia is Padrón.

The followers of the executed bishop Priscillian of Avila were deeply embedded in the culture of Iberia's northwest. To restore Catholic orthodoxy in the Visigothic marches that were recovered from the Kingdom of the Suebi (Galicia) in a series of campaigns during the years leading up to 585, nine dioceses were established in Galicia, including Iria Flavia, mentioned in the document Parroquial suevo (ca 572–582); the Parroquial divides the region into dioceses and marks the first definitive integration of this zone in the monarchy of the Visigoths, who had been catholicized from Arianism in 587 (Quiroga and Lovell 1999). The list of the bishops of Iria present at councils and noted in other sources begins in the sixth century with an Andreas and gains historic credibility in the seventh . No commercial or political rationale for siting a bishop at Iria Flavia seems to present itself, though excavations have identified a cult sanctuary dating to the second half of the sixth century (Quiroga and Lovelle 1999). The relics that were identified with Saint James the Greater and which were transferred to Compostela may originally have determined the location of the diocese at Iria, to control the already sanctified site.

At any rate, otherwise unidentified considerations dictated that the new bishopric take the place of the older bishopric at Aquae Celenae (modern Caldes De Reis), which was a Roman municipium and administrative center that was formerly of considerably more importance than isolated Iria.

Under Adaulfus (Ataulf) II, the city was destroyed by Norse Viking fleet, the year of 858.

In 1024 it gained territory from the suppressed Diocese of Tui, only to lose it back in 1069 to (re)establish the Diocese of Tui.

In 1095, through reverence for the body and the sepulchre of St James, Urban II, by a Bull of December 5, withdrew from Iria its episcopal rank and transferred the see in its entirety to Compostela, in favour of the Cluniac bishop, Dalmatius, present at the Council of Clermont that year. At the same time Urban exempted it from the authority of the metropolitan and made it immediately subject to the Holy See.

About the year 1100 Diego Gelmírez, bishop of Compostela, rebuilt the former cathedral church, Santa Maria Adina, which had been destroyed by Almanzor. Excavations have revealed that the site was built on Roman foundations. A Roman votive figure of a bull has been found, published in Corpus Artis Gallaeciae .

As the legend of Saint James the Greater having proselytized in Hispania spread, Iria Flavia came to be accounted the first site of his preaching.

=== Residential Bishops of Iria Flavia ===
(possibly missing earlier incumbents)

- Andrew (fl. 561 – 572) (Note: Signed the acts of the First Council of Braga and the Second Council of Braga.)
- Dominicus (fl. 589) (Note: Signed the acts of the Third Council of Toledo.)
- Samuel (fl. 633) (Note: Signed the acts of the Fourth Council of Toledo.)
- Gotomar (fl. 638 – 646) (Note: Signed the acts of the Sixth Council of Toledo and the Seventh Council of Toledo.)
- Vincibilis (fl. 653) (Note: Signed the acts of the Eighth Council of Toledo.)
- Ildulfus Felix (fl. 675 – 688) (Note: Signed the acts of the Third Council of Braga, the Twelfth Council of Toledo, the Thirteenth Council of Toledo and the Fifteenth Council of Toledo.)
- Selva, during the reign of Wittiza (694 – 702/3)
- Theodesind (fl. 709)
- Emila, during the reign of Pelagius (718–737)
- Roman, during the reign of Fruela I (757–768)
- Agustine, during the reign of Fruela I
- Honoratus, during the reign of Fruela I
- Vincele, during the reign of Aurelius (768–774)
- Cresconius I, during the reign of Silo (774–783)
- Vaula, during the reign of Mauregatus (783–789)
- Quendulf (fl. c. 790–818) (Note: Was bishop during the reign of Bermudo I (788/9–791) and still alive in 818.)
- Theodemar (c. 818 – 847), discovered the tomb of Saint James in 830
- Ataulf = Adaulfus I (c. 847 – c. 851)
- Ataulf II (c. 851 – c. 867)
- Sisenand I = Sisnando (877?79 – 919?20)
- Gundesindo Alóitez (fl. 923) = Gundesindo (920? – 924)
- Hermenegild(o) (924–951)
- Sisenand II = Sisnando II (951?52 – 958?968)
- Rudesind (apostolic administrator 970–977)
- Pelayo Rodríguez (977 – resigned 985)
- Pedro de Mezonzo (Peter I) (985?86 – 1003?)
- Pelayo Díaz (fl. 1007) (1003? – 1011)
- Vimara Díaz (fl. 1011 – 1013?)
- Vistruarius = Vistruario (1014?16 – 1032?36)
- Servandus (existence doubtful)
- Cresconius II Cresconio (1037?48 – 1066)
- Gudesteus = Gudesteo (1066?67 – 1069?70)
- Diego Peláez (1071?75 – 1088? see below), first time
- Peter II (1088–1090)
- Diego Peláez (see above 1090–1094), second time
- Dalmatius = Dalmacio (1094–1095), first bishop of the Latin rite

=== Titular see ===
In 1969 the diocese was nominally restored as Latin Titular bishopric of Iria Flavia (also Curiate Italian) / Irien(sis) (Latin adjective).

So far it had only one incumbent, of the fitting Episcopal (lowest) rank :

- Gerd Dicke (1970.02.16 – ...), as Auxiliary Bishop of Roman Catholic Diocese of Aachen (Germany) (1970.02.16 – 2003.11.21) and since on emeritate.

== Sources and external links ==
- Catholic Encyclopedia: Compostela
- GCatholic - Iria Flavia
- "Iria de Flavia" (In Spanish)
- "Academia Iria Flavia"
- Jorge Quiroga and Monica R. Lovelle, "Ciudades atlánticas en transición: La “ciudad” tardo-antigua y alto-medieval en el noroeste de la Península Ibérica (s.V-XI)" from Archeologia Medievale vol xxvii (1999), pp 257–268
