= Metopius =

Galician bishop

Metopius was a churchman in Galicia, Spain, in the 7th century. He served as bishop in the diocese of Britonia under Visigothic rule. He is the second bishop of the see documented in surviving sources, after Mailoc. The only reliable contemporary reference to him is his participation in the Fourth Council of Toledo, held in 633.

== Background ==
After the last known mention of Mailoc, recorded at the Second Council of Braga in 572, sources are silent about the diocese of Britonia for more than sixty years. The next known bishop is Metopius, attested at the Fourth Council of Toledo, convened by King Sisenand in 633 and presided over by Isidore of Seville. The council’s acts list him among the signatory bishops as the bishop of Britonia.

The see of the Britons (sedem Britonorum) was recorded in the region by 569, where Romano-Britons had settled in the fifth or sixth century. Metopius' attendance at the Council of Toledo demonstrates its survival after the former Suebi kingdom was incorporated into the Visigothic Kingdom in 585.

The lack of records between 572 and 633 makes it impossible to establish the succession of bishops in Britonia during that period. Metopius should therefore be regarded as the second bishop of the diocese documented in surviving sources, but not necessarily as Mailoc’s immediate successor.

The next known bishop of Britonia after Metopius was Sonna, who is recorded at the Seventh Council of Toledo in 646 and was represented again at the Eighth Council of Toledo in 653.

Catholic Church titles
Preceded by Mailoc	Bishop of Britonia ?-–633-?	Succeeded by Sonna of Britonia
