= Paschasius of Dumium =

From a 15th-century German manuscript, now Bodleian MS. Laud Misc. 346

Paschasius of Dumium (fl. 6th century) was a monk of Dumium in the Suevic kingdom of Gallaecia who translated the Sayings of the Desert Fathers from Greek into Latin.

Paschasius is known only from his own preface. Contrary to what many modern scholars have said, there is no evidence that he was a deacon. He learned Greek from Martin, future bishop of Braga, who arrived at Dumium around 550. Martin commissioned the translation. In his dedicatory preface, Paschasius addresses Martin as a "priest and abbot", indicating that the translation was made during Martin's abbacy, before he became a bishop in 556. Since Paschasius had to learn Greek before executing the translation, it is probable that the work was completed only towards 555. He entitled it Interrogationes et responsiones Graecorum patrum ('Questions and answers of the Greek fathers'). It probably served as a monastic rule at Dumium and introduced eastern ideas of asceticism to the region.

Paschasius's Latin is simple and he preserves many Greek idioms. His original work was in two long books, but the whole does not survive. There are two surviving versions, a long one and a short one. The long is the more common in the manuscripts, but only the short one has been published and translated into English. In all, only about one fifth of the original work survives across all versions. The title is known from the long version and the work is also cited by title in Sigebert of Gembloux's De viris illustribus, sive de scriptoribus ecclesiasticis in the 11th century. Henry d'Arci incorporated some of Paschasius's material into his Anglo-Norman verse adaptation of the Sayings in the 13th century.

== Excerpts ==
From Paschasius's preface:

When you asked me, most holy father, to translate into the Latin language the Lives of the Greek Fathers, which are carefully and eloquently composed, like many other works of the Greeks, I should have refused this unaccustomed task, if I had been allowed. I have never yet fashioned anything to be either written or read, being prohibited by my lack of ability and self-conviction. Lest I should be stealing an expression from the very wise Socrates, I dare not say that I know that I know nothing. Since I must accede to your request, I shall not mention my ability, but rather shall display even in an assigned work the confidence which I owe to you. But since there are many books of these eloquent men written in the Latin language, with the reading of which I have been admittedly acquainted under your instructions, if you happen to find anything inserted here from those sources or anything not eloquently expressed, please do not consider it my fault, because I have translated those writings exactly as they were in the manuscript that was given to me, although I admit that I am not able to do even that correctly. Hence, it remains for me to finish through your prayers what I have begun by your request. If you decide that it should be published, you must consent to improve it with your own words, for I shall not be satisfied that you liked any of it until I know that you disliked some of it.

Chapter 34, §1, contains an account of Arsenius the Great:

Abbot Arsenius was once asked by Abbot Marcus why he fled from men. He replied: "God knows that I love men, but I cannot be both with God and with men. The multitudes above and the virtues have but one will, while men have many and varied wills; for this reason, I cannot leave God and be with men."

== Bibliography ==
- Andrés Sanz, María Adelaida (2018). "Pascasio de Dumio". Diccionario biográfico español. Real Academia de la Historia.
- Barlow, Claude W., ed. (1969). Iberian Fathers, Volume 1: Martin of Braga, Paschasius of Dumium, Leander of Seville. Catholic University of America Press.
- Ferreiro, Alberto (2018). "Paschasius of Dumium, S.". In Nicholson, Oliver (ed.). The Oxford Dictionary of Late Antiquity, Volume 2: J–Z. Oxford: Oxford University Press. p. 1141. ISBN 978-0-19-881625-6.
- Freire, José Geraldes, ed. (1971). A versão latina por Pascásio de Dume dos Apophthegmata Patrum. Coimbra: Faculdade de Letras.
