= Sonna (disambiguation) =

Sonna is an American post-rock band.

Sonna or SONNA may also refer to:

- Somali National News Agency
- Sonna of Britonia, 7th-century Britonian priest in Galicia
- Sonna, Bagalkot, a village in Bilagi Taluka, Bagalkot District, Karnataka, India
- Sonna, Bellary, a village in Hagari Bommanahalli Taluka, Bellary District, Karnataka, India

== See also ==
- Sunnah or sunna, the oral precepts of Mohammed, in Islam
