= Susa of Britonia =

Britonian priest and bishop in Galicia

Susa of Britonia (fl. 653) was a medieval Britonian priest and bishop in Galicia.

Catholic Church titles
Preceded by Sonna of Britonia	Bishop of Britonia fl. 653	Succeeded by Bela of Britonia
