= Mailoc =

6th-century bishop of Britonia, Iberia

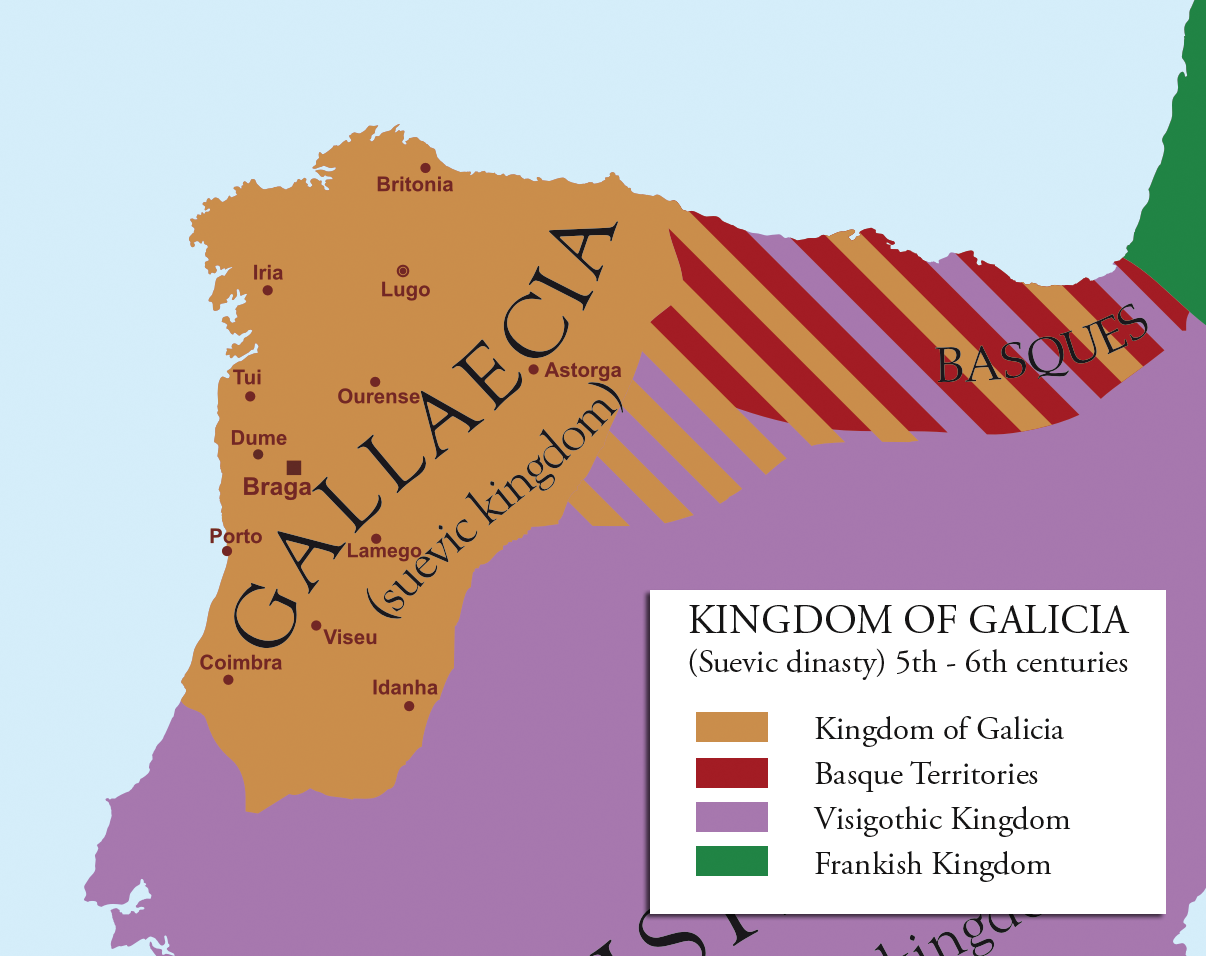
The Kingdom of the Suebi in Galicia c. 6th century AD.

Mailoc or Maeloc was a 6th-century bishop of Britonia, a settlement founded by migrating Britons in Galicia, Spain. He represented his diocese, referred to as the Britonensis ecclesia or "Britonnic church", at the Second Council of Braga in 572. Records of the council refer to his see, the sedes Britonarum ("See of the Britons"), which may have been seated at the monastery of Saint Mary of Britonia. Mailoc's name is clearly Brythonic, deriving from the Celtic *Maglācos, thereby providing further evidence for the Britonnic presence in the area, but he is the only one to have a Celtic name.

== See also ==
- Diocese of Ferrol-Mondoñedo (Formerly known as: Dioecesis Britoniensis).

== Notes ==
Catholic Church titles
Preceded by New Title	Bishop of Britonia ?-572–?	Succeeded by Metopius
