= Bartholomew of Braga =

Portuguese Dominican theologian (1514–1590)

Saint Saint Bartholomew of Braga O.P.
- Archbishop Emeritus of Braga
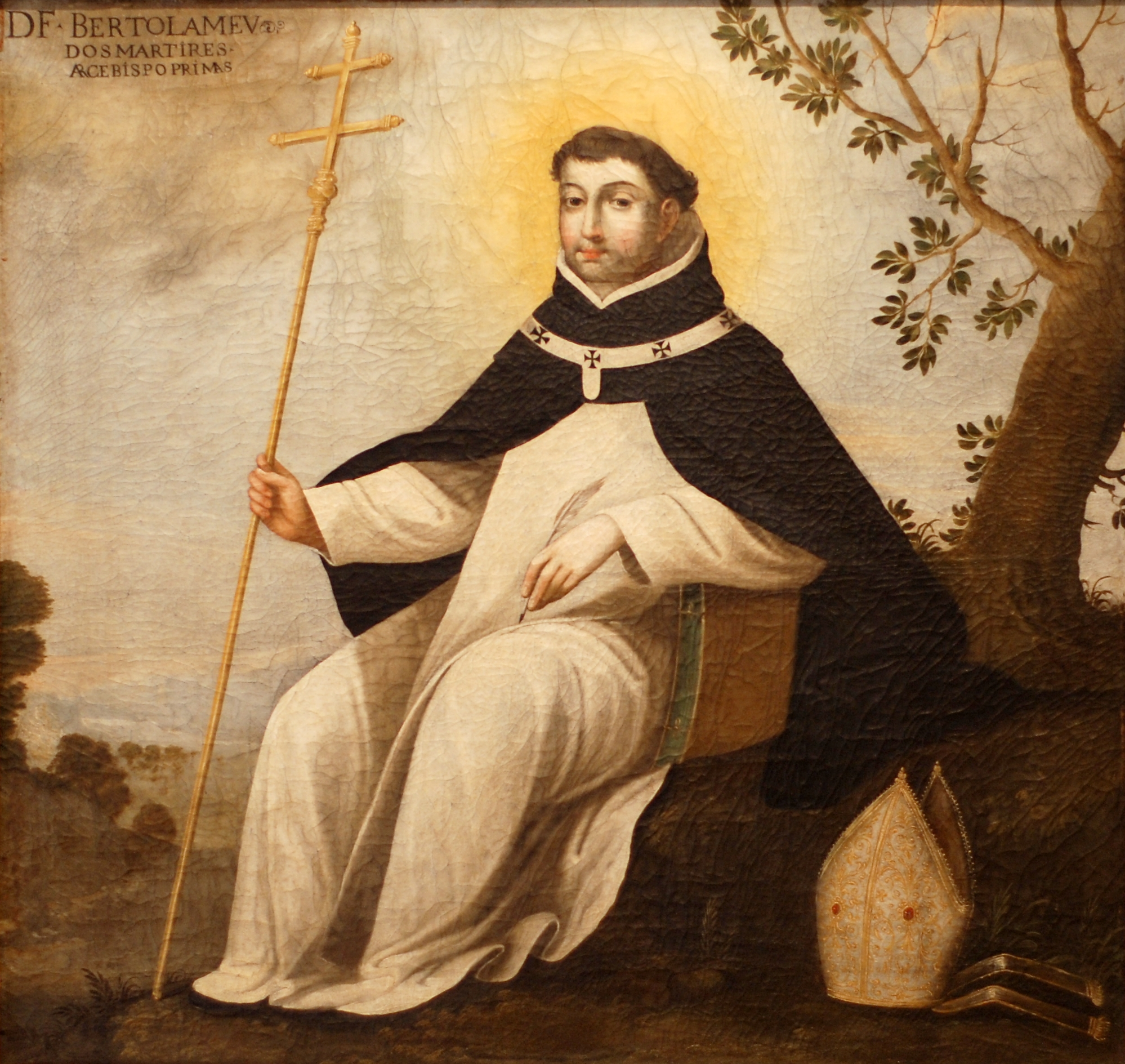
- Bartolomeu dos Mártires - António André (1618-25).
- Church: Catholic Church
- Archdiocese: Archdiocese of Braga
- Appointed: 29 January 1559
- Installed: 4 October 1559
- Term ended: 23 February 1582
- Predecessor: Baltazar Limpo
- Successor: João Afonso de Menezes

Orders
- Consecration: 3 September 1559 by João Soares

Personal details
- Born: Bartolomeu Fernandes; 3 May 1514 Mártires, Santa Maria Maior, Lisbon, Kingdom of Portugal
- Died: 16 July 1590 (aged 76) Viana do Castelo, Minho, Kingdom of Portugal

Sainthood
- Feast day: 16 July
- Venerated in: Catholic Church
- Beatified: 4 November 2001; Saint Peter's Square, Vatican City by Pope John Paul II
- Canonized: 5 July 2019; Apostolic Palace, Vatican City by Pope Francis
- Attributes: Episcopal attire; Dominican habit; Pastoral staff
- Patronage: Archdiocese of Braga; Catechists

Saint Bartholomew of the Martyrs (born Bartolomeu Fernandes; 3 May 1514 – 16 July 1590), also known as Saint Bartolomew of Braga, was a Portuguese Dominican prelate who served as Archbishop of Braga. He participated in the Council of Trent and collaborated with Charles Borromeo there. He also established hospitals and hospices in Braga while publishing a range of works, including catechism.

The sainthood process for him commenced under Pope Benedict XIV in 1754 and he was titled as a Servant of God. Pope Gregory XVI declared him Venerable in 1845. Pope John Paul II beatified Fernandes in Saint Peter's Square on 4 November 2001. Pope Francis approved the equipollent canonization for him in 2019 after waiving the second miracle needed for him to become a saint.

== Life ==
Bartolomeu Fernandes was born near Lisbon on 3 May 1514 to Domingos Fernandes and Maria Correia; he was baptized mere hours after in the local parish church of Nossa Senhora dos Mártires.

He entered the Order of Preachers on 11 November 1527 and later made his solemn profession into the order on 20 November 1529. On the completion of his own studies in 1538 he taught philosophical studies in the convent of the order at Lisbon and then for about two decades taught theological studies in the various houses of his order. In 1551 he received his master's degree at the provincial chapter of Salamanca in Spain. He taught in Batalha and then in Évora. He also served as the prior of the Benfica convent from 1557 to 1558 and was in Évora as a teacher from 1538 until 1557.

During the course of teaching theological studies at the Batalha convent he was summoned to Évora at the request of Luis of Portugal, Duke of Beja to undertake the religious education of his son who was entering the ecclesiastical life himself; he dedicated time to this great task. In 1558 - against his own desires - and out of obedience to his provincial superior (Louis of Granada) he accepted the appointment to the archepiscopal see of Braga for which Queen Catherine had chosen him for and in 1559 received his episcopal consecration at the convent of Saint Dominic on 3 September 1559 from the Bishop of Coimbra João Soares. In fact it was Luis of Grenada who was to become the archbishop though Luis urged the queen to select Fernandes instead. Pope Paul IV confirmed this appointment in the papal bull "Gratiae divinae praemium" on 27 January 1559. He devoted himself to the duties of his new office with his installation in his archdiocese on 4 October 1559.

Styles of Bartholomew of the Martyrs
- Reference style: His Most Reverend Lordship
- Spoken style: Your Most Reverend Lordship
- Posthumous style: Saint

On the resumption of the Council of Trent in 1561 the archbishop repaired to the council and took part in the last sessions. He made a total of 268 suggestions at the council and collaborated with Charles Borromeo. There was also one instance in which he pushed for the defense of a certain topic and opposed view of the Archbishop of Toledo Bartolomé Carranza. He was esteemed and held in high regard among the Council Fathers both on the account of his theological learning and the holiness of his life. The archbishop exercised great influence in the discussions and more so with regard to the decrees on the reform of ecclesiastical life and development.

The conclusion of that council saw him return to Braga in February 1564 and in 1566 he held an important provincial gathering of the diocese in which decrees were passed for the restoration of ecclesiastical discipline and the elevation of the moral life of priests and people ("Concilium provinciale Bracarense quartum" in 1567). The archbishop now devoted himself to the task of enacting the reforms of the Council of Trent in addition to the decrees of his own provincial synod. A great famine and a visitation of the plague revealed the depths of his charitable and merciful nature in addition to his willingness to aid his flock in their time of need; he also constructed a series of hospitals and hospices.

He made repeated requests to resign from his episcopal see and received papal permission from Pope Gregory XIII on 20 February 1582 to resign and withdraw to his order's convent at Viana do Castelo where he lived in solitude for the remainder of his life but also serving as a teacher for some time.

Fernandes died at Viana do Castelo on 16 July 1590.

A statue of him mounted on a donkey can be found in Viana do Castelo, Portugal. Part of the name on the pedestal reads, "Bartolomeu dos Martires".

== Works ==
In the interests of Christian life and the promotion of ecclesiastical discipline he wrote the following publications:

- "Compendium spiritualis doctrinae ex variis sanc. Patrum sententiis magna ex parte collectum" (Lisbon, 1582)
- "Stimulus pastorum ex gravissimis sanct. Patrum sententiis concinnatus, in quo agitur de vita et moribus episcoporum aliorumque praelatorum" (Rome, 1564; published at the insistence of Charles Borromeo)
- "Catechismo ou Doutrina christiana" (Lisbon, 1562).

All of these writings have been republished on numerous occasions and have also been translated into several languages. A collective edition is: "Opera omnia cura et studio Malachiae d'Inguinbert, archiepisc. Theodos." (1 vol. Fol. In 2 parts, Rome, 1734–35).

== Sainthood ==
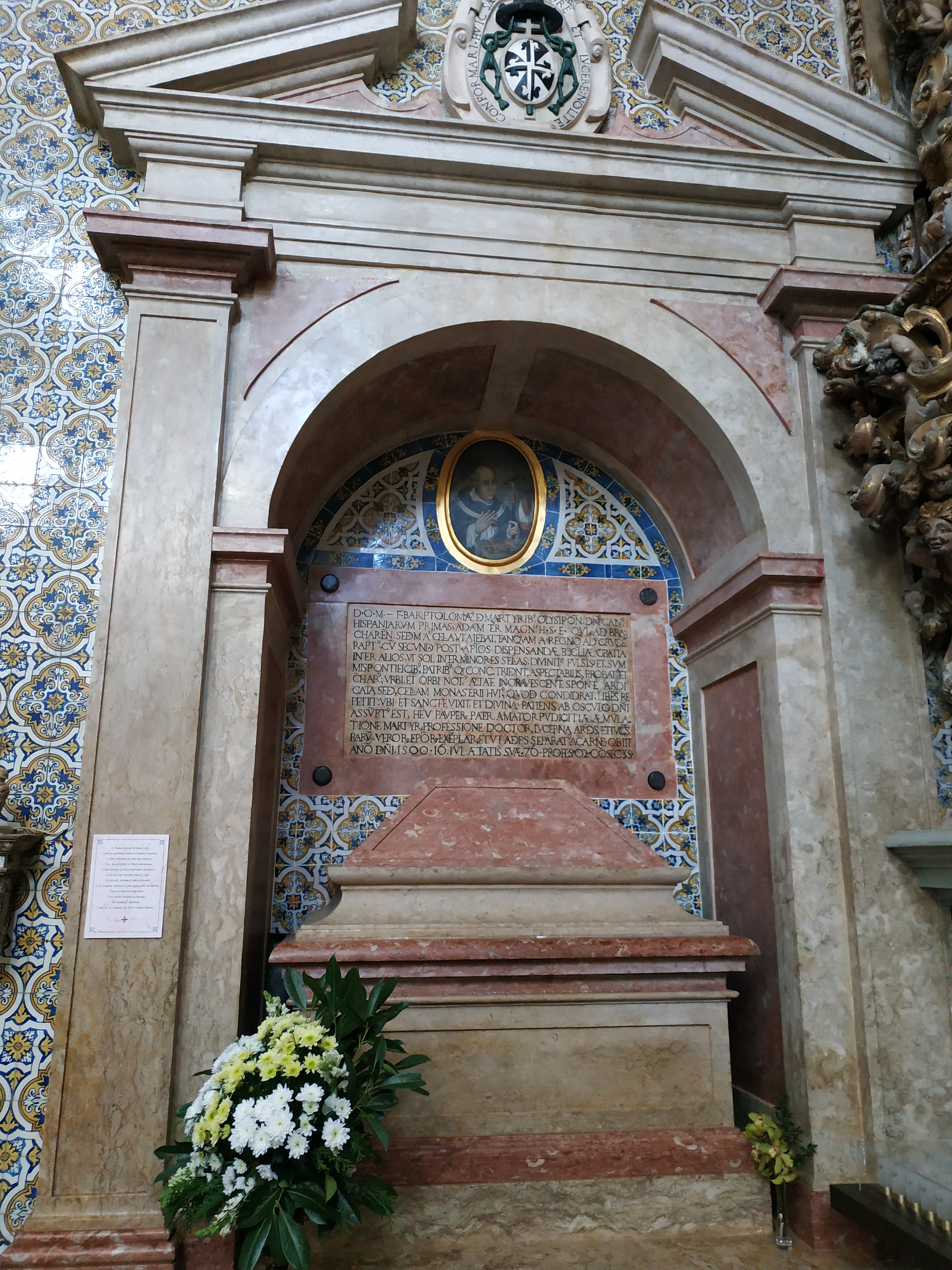
Tomb in Viana do Castelo.

The beatification process opened in an informative process that Archbishop Rodrigo da Cunha inaugurated on 20 January 1631. The formal introduction to the cause came under Pope Benedict XIV on 11 September 1754 and he became titled as a Servant of God. Archbishop Gaspar de Bragança inaugurated the apostolic process on 24 September 1760 and then oversaw its closure in May 1766 while the Congregation of Rites validated these previous processes in Rome on 7 March 1716. His spiritual writings were approved by theologians on 20 March 1809.

An antepreparatory congregation that the C.O.R. instituted approved the cause in a meeting on 31 August 1819 with a preparatory committee to follow on 1 July 1840 and then a meeting of the C.O.R. officials on 26 November 1844 in which approval was also confirmed. The late archbishop was declared to have lived a model Christian life of heroic virtue in a move that allowed for Pope Gregory XVI to title Fernandes as Venerable on 23 May 1845.

The miracle required for beatification was investigated in Portugal and later received validation in Rome on 12 March 1999 from the Congregation for the Causes of Saints in a move that later allowed for a medical board to assess and approve the miracle (determining there was no medical or scientific explanation) on 20 December 2000 while theologians met sometime in 2001 to also approve it (confirming the miracle was a result of his intercession). The cardinal and bishop members of the C.C.S. also issued their approval to the miracle on 3 July 2001 while Pope John Paul II declared on 7 July 2001 that the healing was indeed a genuine miracle in a move that confirmed the late archbishop's beatification; the pope beatified him on 4 November 2001 in Saint Peter's Square.

Pope Francis – on 20 January 2016 – authorized the C.C.S. to work towards the equipollent canonization of the late archbishop and authorized that the second miracle required for his canonization be waived as a result. The pope approved the late archbishop's equipollent canonization in a decree issued on 5 July 2019 therefore naming him as a saint.

The current postulator assigned to this cause is Vito Tomás Gómez García.

== Sources ==
- Bartholomew of the Martyrs (2023). Prudlo, Donald S. (ed.). Stimulus Pastorum: A Charge to Pastors. St. Augustine's Press. ISBN 1-58731-855-5.
