= Savaric I (bishop of Mondoñedo) =

Galician clergyman

Sabaricus I (served as bishop 866–877) was a medieval Galician clergyman.

Catholic Church titles
Preceded by Bela of Britonia	Bishop of Dumium; 866–877	Succeeded by Rudesindus I
