= Bela of Britonia =

Galician clergyman

Bela of Britonia (? - 675 - ?) was a medieval Galician clergyman.

Catholic Church titles
Preceded by Susa of Britonia	Bishop of Britonia ?-–675-?	Succeeded by Sabaricus I
