= Obbi =

Obbi may refer to:

- Obbi, Mauretania, an Ancient city and former Roman bishopric, now a Catholic titular see
- OBBI, code for Bahrain International Airport
- Mamadou Obbi Oularé (born 1996), Belgian-Guinian association football player
