= Obbi, Mauretania =

Ancient city

See Obbi for namesakes

Obbi was an ancient city and former diocese in Africa Proconsulare. It is now a Roman Catholic titular see.

== History ==
Obbi was among the numerous towns in the Roman province of Mauretania Caesariensis which were important enough to become a suffragan bishopric, yet faded completely, even its location in modern Algeria hasn't been identified.

Its only recorded incumbent, Eusabius, attended the Council of Carthage of 484, called by the king Huneric, as one of his Vandal Kingdom's Catholic bishops, like most of those afterwards banished, unlike the schismatic adherents of the heresy Donatism.

== Titular see ==
The diocese was nominally restored in 1933 as Latin titular bishopric of Obbi (Latin = Curiate Italian) / Obbitan(us) (Latin adjective).

It has had the following incumbents, so far of the fitting Episcopal (lowest) rank:

- Manuel Ferreira Cabral (1965.01.16 – 1967.07.03) as Auxiliary Bishop of Archdiocese of Braga (Portugal) (1965.01.16 – 1967.07.03); later Bishop of Beira (Mozambique) (1967.07.03 – 1971.07.01), Titular Bishop of Dume (1972.10.21 – death 1981.12.12) as (again) Auxiliary Bishop of Archdiocese of Braga (Portugal) (1972.10.21 – 1981.12.12)
- Franz von Streng (1967.11.03 – death 1970.08.07) as emeritate; previously Bishop of Basel und Lugano (Switzerland) ([1936.11.17] 1936.11.30 – 1967.11.03)
- Henri-François-Marie-Pierre Derouet (1970.10.21 – 1971.07.24) as Coadjutor Bishop of Séez (France) (1970.10.21 – succession 1971.07.24); next Bishop of Séez (1971.07.24 – 1985.10.10), Bishop of Arras (northern France) (1985.10.10 – retired 1998.08.12), died 2004
- Guy Alexis Herbulot (1974.06.20 – 1978.05.12) as Auxiliary Bishop of Archdiocese of Reims (northern France) (1974.06.20 – 1978.05.12); later last Bishop of Corbeil (France) (1978.05.12 – 1988.06.11), restyled first Bishop of Évry-Corbeil-Essonnes (France) (1988.06.11 – retired 2000.04.15)
- Bede Vincent Heather (1979.06.30 – 1986.04.08) as Auxiliary Bishop of Archdiocese of Sydney (Australia) (1979.06.30 – 1986.04.08); later first Bishop of Parramatta (Australia) (1986.04.08 – retired 1997.07.10); died 2021
- Albert Jean-Marie Rouet (1986.06.21 – 1993.12.16) as Auxiliary Bishop of Paris (France) (1986.06.21 – 1993.12.16); later Coadjutor Bishop of Poitiers (France) (1993.12.16 – succession 1994.06.12), last suffragan Bishop of Poitiers (France) (1994.06.12 – 2002.12.08), promoted first Metropolitan Archbishop of Archdiocese of Poitiers (France) (2002.12.08 – retired 2011.02.12)
- Adriano Tomasi Travaglia, Friars Minor (O.F.M.) (2002.02.16 – ...), as Auxiliary Bishop of Archdiocese of Lima (Peru) (2002.02.16 – ...), no previous prelature.

== See also ==
- List of Catholic dioceses in Algeria

== Sources and external links ==
- GCatholic - data for all sections
- J. Mesnage, L'Afrique chrétienne, Paris 1912, p. 498
