= Dume =

- Civil parish
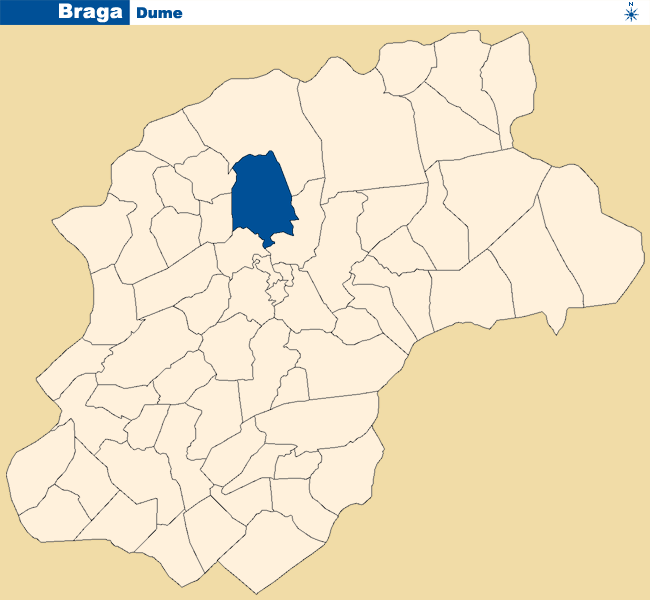
- Coordinates: 41.571°N 8.434°W
- Country: Portugal
- Region: Norte
- Intermunic. comm.: Cávado
- District: Braga
- Municipality: Braga
- Disbanded: 2013

Area
  - Total: 4.34 km^{2} (1.68 sq mi)

Population
  - Total: 3,081
  - Density: 710/km^{2} (1,840/sq mi)
- Time zone: UTC+00:00 (WET)
  - Summer (DST): UTC+01:00 (WEST)
- Postal code: 4700-055

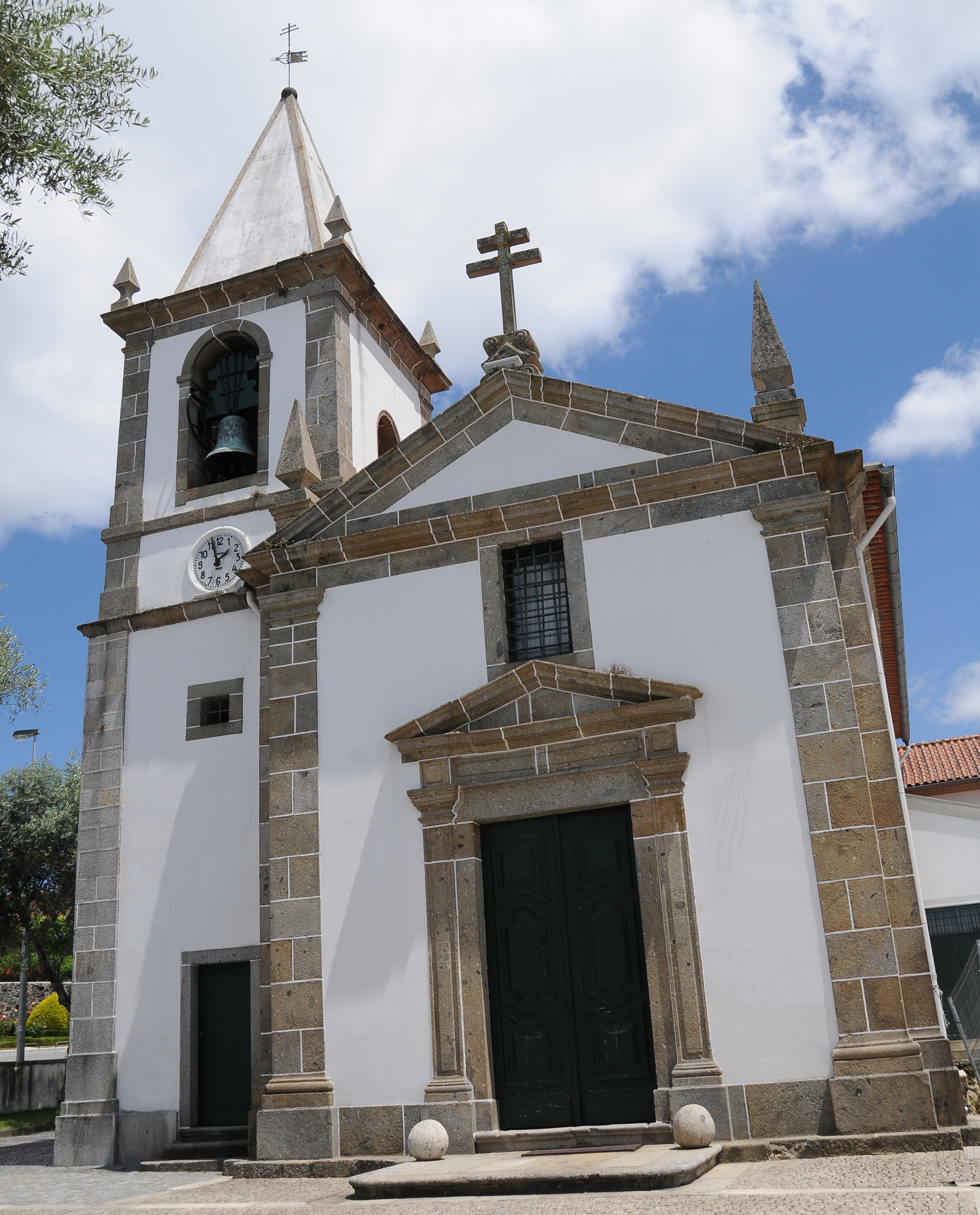
Dume Church

Dume is a former freguesia ("civil parish") and former bishopric in the municipality of Braga, northern Portugal, which remains a Catholic titular see.

In 2013, the parish merged into the new parish Real, Dume e Semelhe. It has a population of 3,081 and a total area of 4.34 square kilometres (1.68 sq mi).

== History ==
Dume enjoyed in earlier times a relief situation especially in the sixth century during the reign of Theodemar king of the Suebi. His father, Chararic, invoked Saint Martin of Tours, when Theodemar was affected by a disease in childhood.

After obtaining the cure in 550, he founded a church in Dume and sent emissaries to Gaul in search of relics of the saint. By providential provision, the emissaries of the king met with Martin of Pannonia (later to be canonized and known as Martin of Dume), who was heading from Jerusalem to Gaul, to the tomb of his namesake and compatriot. That meeting showed him the place where it should go to exercise his apostolate, because until then the Suebi had professed Arianism. He landed possibly in Portus Cale, where he went to Braga, to the court of Theodemar, completing the king's conversion, with the help of the bishop Eleutério and the bishop of Coimbra, Lucêncio. From Theodemar he obtained the newly founded Church of Dume, next to whom he built the Monastery of Dumio.

So remarkable became his action that in 558 it was elevated to the episcopal dignity, turning the church into a cathedral, the area of the monastery becoming the Bishopric of Dume.

With the Christian reconquest, after the Muslim invasion, the small diocese of Dume became embedded in Braga. The ancient parish of São Martinho de Dume was one resignation from the patronage of the presentation of the prelate of Braga.

In the parish there are several chapels, including one in the Romanesque style, in place of the Order, headed by S. Lawrence. It is tradition to have worked in this chapel the canon of the Cathedral of Braga, in a time that an epidemic was raging in the city. At the place of Cabanas, there is a Manor house with a chapel, where on 25 December 1888, the resigning Archbishop of Braga Dom João Crisóstomo de Amorim Pessoa died.

According to tradition a great battle against the Moors occurred in this parish and in the places of Anteportas and Sobremoure.

== Ecclesiastical history ==
- Established in 558 as Diocese of Dume / Dumien(sis) (Latin), on territory split off from its Metropolitan, the Roman Catholic Archdiocese of Braga - see above for the royal patronage.
- Suppressed in 1114, its territory being merged into the (Spanish, renamed) Roman Catholic Diocese of San Martiño de Mondoñedo–Dume, which retained its title until 1219 when it was renamed back Diocese of Mondoñedo having lost Dume's territory to the Metropolitan Archdiocese of Braga).

=== Residential Ordinaries ===
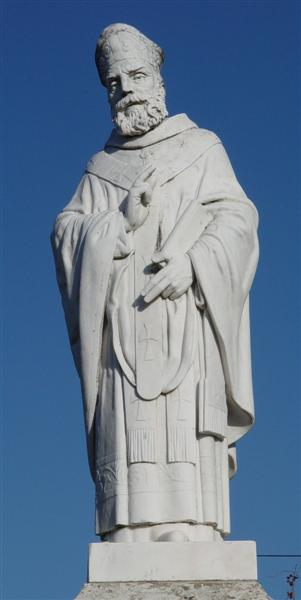
Statue of S. Martinho de Dume

(all Roman Rite)

Suffragan Bishops of Dume

- Saint Archbishop Martinho de Dume e Braga (556 – 579.03.20), later Metropolitan Archbishop of Braga (Portugal) (562 – death 579.03.20)
- João (? – 589)
- Benjamim (? – 610)
- Germano (? – 633)
- Recimiro (646 – 653)
- Saint Bishop Frutuoso de Dume e Braga (? – 656), later Metropolitan Archbishop of Braga (Portugal) (656 – 660)
- Leodigísio (? – 675)
- Liúva (? – 681)
- Vicente (? – 688)
- Félix (693 – 716)

From 866 all incumbents are the Bishops of the Spanish neighbor Diocese of San Martiño de Mondoñedo, until they formally merge in 1114.

=== Titular see ===
The diocese was nominally restored in 1969 as Latin Titular bishopric of Dume (Portuguese) / Dumio (Curiate Italian) / Dumium (Latin) / Dumien(sis) (Latin adjective).

It has had the following incumbents, so far of the fitting Episcopal (lowest) rank :

- Manuel Ferreira Cabral (1972.10.21 – death 1981.12.12) as Auxiliary Bishop of Braga (Portugal) (1972.10.21 – 1981.12.12); formerly Titular Bishop of Obbi (1965.01.16 – 1967.07.03) as Auxiliary Bishop of Braga (Portugal) (1965.01.16 – 1967.07.03), Bishop of Beira (Mozambique) (1967.07.03 – 1971.07.01)
- Carlos Francisco Martins Pinheiro (1985.02.16 – death 2010.06.04) as Auxiliary Bishop of Braga (Portugal) (1985.02.16 – 2000.11.10) and as emeritate
- Crispin Ojeda Marquez (2011.06.04 – ...), Auxiliary Bishop of Braga (Portugal) (1972.10.21 – 1981.12.12); formerly Titular Bishop of Obbi (1965.01.16 – 1967.07.03) as Auxiliary Bishop of México (City, Mexico) (2011.06.04 – ...).

== See also ==
- List of Catholic dioceses in Portugal

== Sources and external links ==
- GCatholic with satellite photo - former & titular see
