= Sonna of Britonia =

Britonian priest in Galicia

Sonna of Britonia (?–646–?) was a medieval Britonian priest in Galicia who signed at the Seventh Council of Toledo.

Catholic Church titles
Preceded by Metopius	Bishop of Britonia ?–646–?	Succeeded by Susa of Britonia
