= Third Council of Braga =

The Third Council of Braga was held in 675, during the primacy of Leodegisius, and in the reign of King Wamba. It was attended by eight bishops.

Eight decrees were promulgated at this council; (1) that no one should dare to offer in sacrifice milk and grapes, but bread and wine mixed with a drop of water in a chalice, nor should bread soaking in wine be used; (2) that laymen should be excommunicated, and ecclesiastics deprived of their office, if either put the sacred vessels to profane uses; (4) that no priest should have any woman but his mother in his house; (5-6) that bishops, when carrying the relics of martyrs in procession, must walk to the church, and not be carried in a chair, or litter, by deacons clothed in white; that corporal punishment was not to be inflicted on youthful ecclesiastics, abbots, or priests, except for grievous faults; (7-8) that no fee must be accepted for Holy orders, and that the rectors of the churches must not require that members of their ecclesiastical household to do work on their private farms; if they did so they must recompense the church for the injury done thereby.

== See also ==
- Councils of Braga

== Bibliography ==
- Hefele, Karl Joseph (1895). A History of the Councils of the Church: From the Original Documents. Vol. IV: A.D. 451 to A.D. 680. Edinburgh: T. & T. Clark. pp. 490–491.
- Mansi, J.-D. (ed.). Sacrorum conciliorum nova et amplissima collectio, editio novissima, Tomus undecimus (11) (Florence: A. Zatta 1766), pp. 153–162.
