= Councils of Braga =

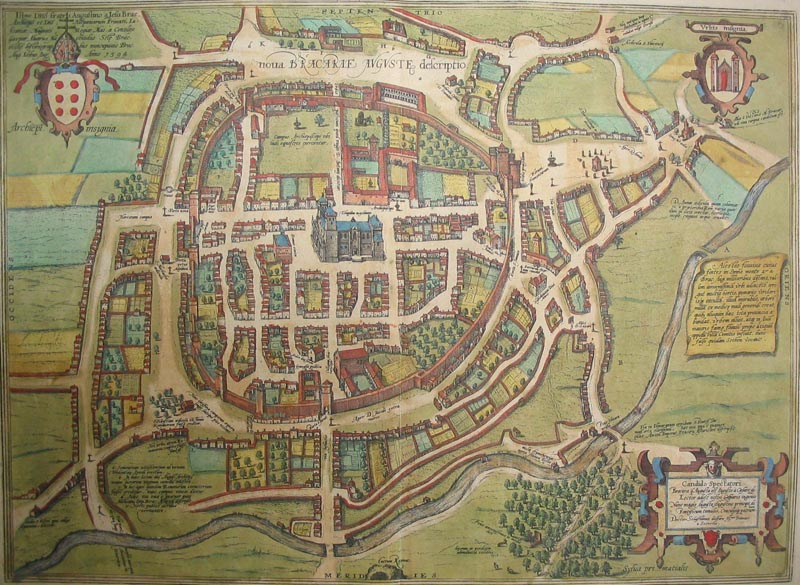
The city of Braga in 1594, as depicted by the Atlas Civitates Orbis Terrarum by Georg Braun and Franz Hogenberg.

Several church councils were held in Braga in the Middle Ages. The Archdiocese of Braga was the metropolitan of an ecclesiastical province and it was the chief bishopric of the Kingdom of Galicia during the Suevic period and in the High Middle Ages, whilst a part of the Kingdom of Portugal.

In addition to these, there are 40 synods recorded in Braga in total: five in the 13th century, seventeen in the 14th century, seven in the 15th century, five in the 16th century, two in the 17th century, one in the 18th century, two in the 20th century and the last in 2021-2023

== List of councils ==
- Council of Braga (411), probably an invention by historian Frei Bernardo de Brito;
- First Council of Braga (561), presided over by Lucretius;
- Second Council of Braga (572), presided over by Saint Martin of Dume;
- Third Council of Braga (675), presided over by Leodegísio Julião;
- Fourth Council of Braga (1137), presided over by Cardinal Jacinto, pontifical legate of Anastasius IV, Adrian IV and Alexander III;
- Fifth Council of Braga (1148), presided over by D. João Peculiar on the occasion of national independence;
- Sixth Council of Braga (1262), presided over by D. Martinho Geraldes;
- Seventh Council of Braga (1286), presided over by D. Frei Telo;
- Eighth Council of Braga (1292), presided over by Martín González, Bishop of Astorga;.
- Ninth Council of Braga (1426), presided over by D. Fernando da Guerra;
- Tenth Council of Braga (1470), presided over by D. Luíz Pires;
- XI Council of Braga (1566), presided over by Saint Bartolomew of Braga, with the aim of applying the reforms of the Council of Trent

== First Council of Braga ==
In the council of 563 eight bishops took part, and twenty-two decrees were promulgated, among others the following:

- that in the services of the church the same rite should be followed by all, and that on vigils and in solemn Masses the same lessons should be said by all
- that bishops and priests should salute the people with Dominus vobiscum, as in the Book of Ruth, the response being Et cum spiritu tuo, as was the custom in the East, without the alterations introduced by the Priscillianists
- that Mass should be said according to the ordo sent from Rome to Profuturus
- that the form used for baptism in the Metropolitan see of Braga should not be altered
- that bishops should take rank after the metropolitan according to the date of their consecration
- that bishops should not ordain candidates from other dioceses without dimissorial letters from their bishop
- that nothing should be sung in the church but the Psalms and parts of the Old and New Testament
- that all priests who abstained from eating meat should be obliged to eat vegetables cooked in meat, to avoid all suspicion of the taint of Priscillianism, and that if they refused they should be excommunicated
- that suicides and catechumens should not be buried with great ceremony, nor should anyone be buried inside the church
- that priests should be appointed for the blessing of the chrism.

== Second Council of Braga ==
The second council held in 572, presided over by the aforesaid Martin, was held to increase the number of bishops in Gallaecia. Twelve bishops assisted at this council, and ten decrees were promulgated:

1. that the bishops should in their visitations see in what manner the priests celebrated the Holy Sacrifice and administered baptism and the other sacraments, thanking God if they found everything as it should be, and instructing the priests if they were found wanting in knowledge, and obliging all catechumens to attend instructions for twenty days before baptism and to learn the creed
2. that the bishop must not be tyrannical towards his priests
3. that no fee must be accepted for Holy orders
4. that the holy chrism must be distributed free
5. that the bishop must not ask a fee for consecrating a church
6. that no church should be consecrated without the bishop being sure of the endowment of the ministers
7. that no church built on private property for the purpose of emolument should receive consecration
8. that if a cleric should accuse any one of unchastity without the evidence of two or three witnesses he should be excommunicated
9. that the metropolitan should announce the date of Easter, and have it made known to the people after Christmas, so that they might be prepared for the beginning of Lent, when litanies were to be recited for three days; on the third day the Lenten fast should be announced after the Mass
10. that any one saying Mass without fasting, as many did, as a result of Priscillianist tendencies, should be deprived of his office.

This council was attended by the bishops of the suffragan sees of Braga, and by those of the Diocese of Lugo, and Pope Innocent III removed all doubt as to its authenticity.

== Third Council of Braga ==
The Third Council of Braga was held in 675, during the primacy of Leodegisius, and in the reign of King Wamba. Eight decrees were promulgated at this council;

1. that no one should dare to offer in sacrifice milk and grapes, but bread and wine mixed with a drop of water in a chalice, nor should bread soaking in wine be used
2. that laymen should be excommunicated if they put the sacred vessels to profane uses
3. that ecclesiastics deprived of their office if they did the same
4. that no priest should have any woman but his mother in his house
5. that bishops, when carrying the relics of martyrs in procession, must walk to the church, and not be carried in a chair, or litter, by deacons clothed in white
6. that corporal punishment was not to be inflicted on youthful ecclesiastics, abbots, or priests, except for grievous faults
7. that no fee must be accepted for Holy orders
8. that the rectors of the churches must not require that members of their ecclesiastical household to do work on their private farms; if they did so they must recompense the church for the injury done thereby.
