= Monastery of Dumio =

- Mosteiro de Dumio (Spanish)
- Archaeological Ruins of São Martinho of Dume
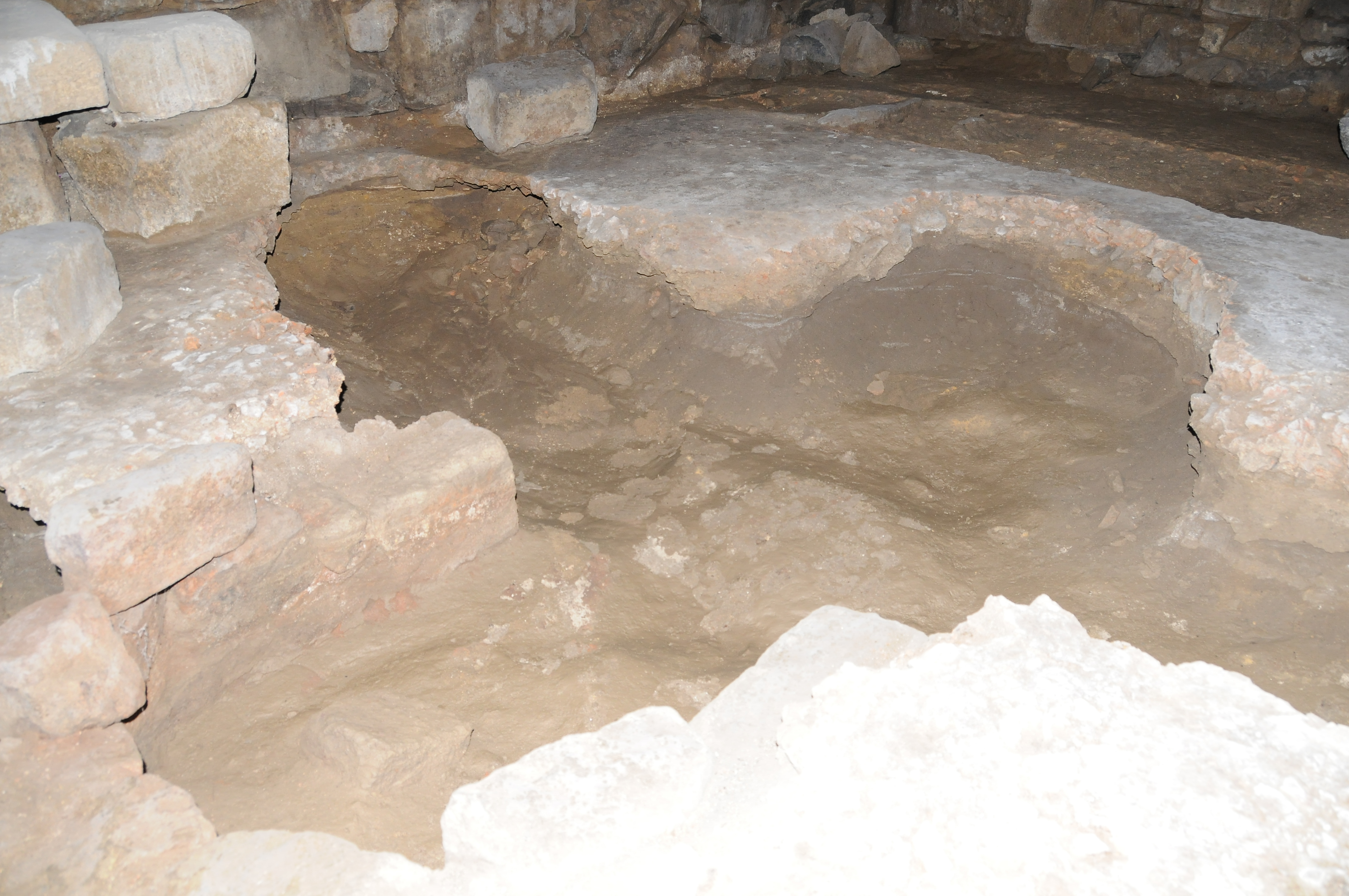
- Interactive map of Monastery of Dumio
- 41°34′1.68″N 8°26′8.03″W
- Location: Braga, Cávado, Portugal

History
- Built: 1st century

The Monastery of Dumio (sometimes Dumium or Dumio, in Portuguese São Martinho de Dume), is a former paleo-Christian monastery in the civil parish of Dume, municipality of Braga, in northwestern Portugal. Originally a Roman villa, it was the base of a basilica by Suebi tribes, and later Christian monastery headed by Martin of Braga in the 6th century (c. 550–560). The re-discovery of the Roman ruins in the late 20th century resulted in archaeological excavations that unearthed its former use.

== History ==
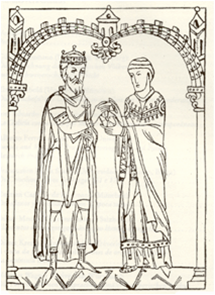
Martin of Braga and one of the Suevic kings of Galicia, Miro

By the 1st century, there already existed an octagonal Roman villa, which, much later (3rd century) included a system of baths.

In the first half of the 6th century, construction of a primitive church was ordered by the Suebi King Chararic (Suebian king), to honour God for curing his son. It can also be inferred that this was a reflection of the expansion and authority of the Suebi within the northern context of Braga. By the middle of the 6th century, the site began to take on an important context within the peninsula. Under Martin of Braga, referred to as the Apostle of the Suebi, the older structures were taken over by a monastery, whose religious importance began to make it the centre of religion in the kingdom, and an autonomous diocese close to Braga. The King himself constructed a palace annex, making the ancient village a centre of decision-making in the Cortes. The design was also a combination of Suebi aesthetics and 6th century influences from southern Gaul; there existed semi-formal links to the Merovingian monarchs with whom the Suebi corresponded, showing artistic influences in the sarcophagus and layout of the basilica.

Three centuries after the construction of São Martinho, and during the Reconquista the basilica was the object of fundamental reforms. The church was transferred to the benevolence of the Bishop of Mondonedo, São Rosendo (later confirmed in 911).

Then, there was a return during the 10th century, with the re-purposing and re-population initiatives of Afonso III. Yet, by this time, the religious complex in Dume was abandoned (or at least in weak decline): neither the memory of Martin of Braga nor its ancient glory would motivate any new importance. It is likely that it may have served as a parochial church, but the ruins discovered on the site clearly indicate that it may not have lasted in this function for long. Dume was returned to the Diocese of Braga around 1103, where it remained, although later indications as to the condition, state or use of the ancient basilica are non-existent.

In 1608, there were references to the hermitage of Nossa Senhora do Rosário, around the houses of the municipal seat. It was also around this time that the actual Matriz Church was completed (17th century). Later expansion of the church was completed in the first half of the 18th century.

Around 1747, the Contador de Argote relates the appearance of diverse archaeological vestiges in Dume, casual objects unearthed by local farmers.

However, it was only in 1987 that a formal identification of a Roman villa under the Chapel of Nossa Senhora do Rosário was completed; Luís O. Fontes, a professor at the department of archeology at the University of Minho detailed his findings in the civil parish. In 1992, formal excavations of the medieval funerary site was begun in Dume. By May 1993, the Roman baths of the Roman villa were discovered. The remains of Martin of Braga were moved to a subterranean tomb alongside the ruins, underneath the chapel. In 1997, the local government (Portuguese: Junta de Freguesia) erected a fence to protect the backyard of the Casa do Assento, whose archaeological structure corresponded to the Roman bathhouse was discovered. The beginning of the exploration of the uncovered paleo-Christian basilica were begun in July 2005. The collection of archaeological artefacts collected during the excavations were deposited with the Museu Dom Diogo de Sousa, in Braga. This included primarily ceramics from the Roman and medieval periods, but also Roman era glass and amphora, corroded medieval coins and decorative Roman mosaics. Also discovered: part of a lid of a sarcophagus, the base of columns, arches, fragments of stems, bows and staves, decorated with a herringbone rosettes and, slabs of limestone and marble that include traces of title and lattice grid.

== Architecture ==
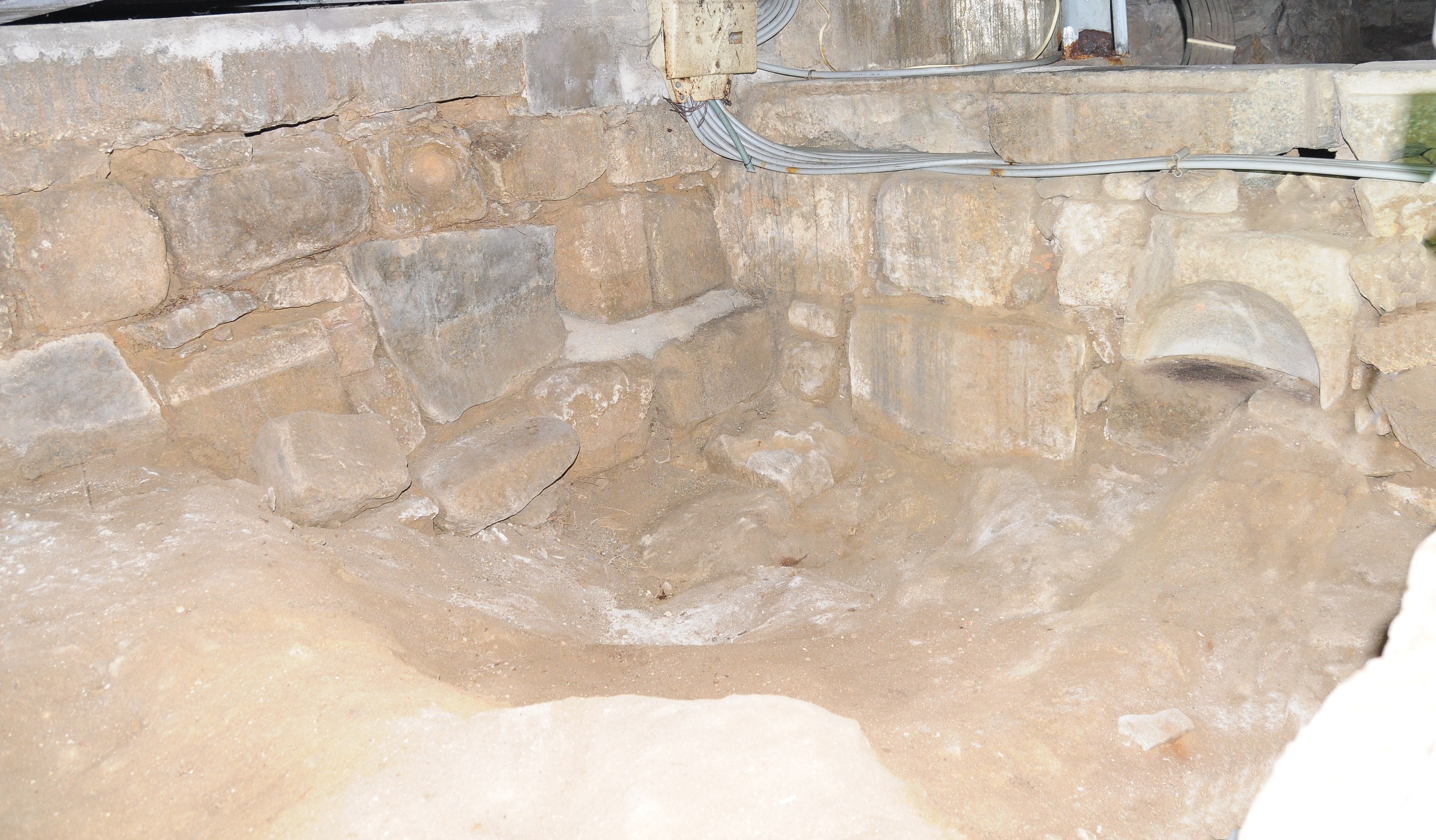
The vestiges of the basilica of Dumio unearthed during excavations around the Matriz Church in Dume

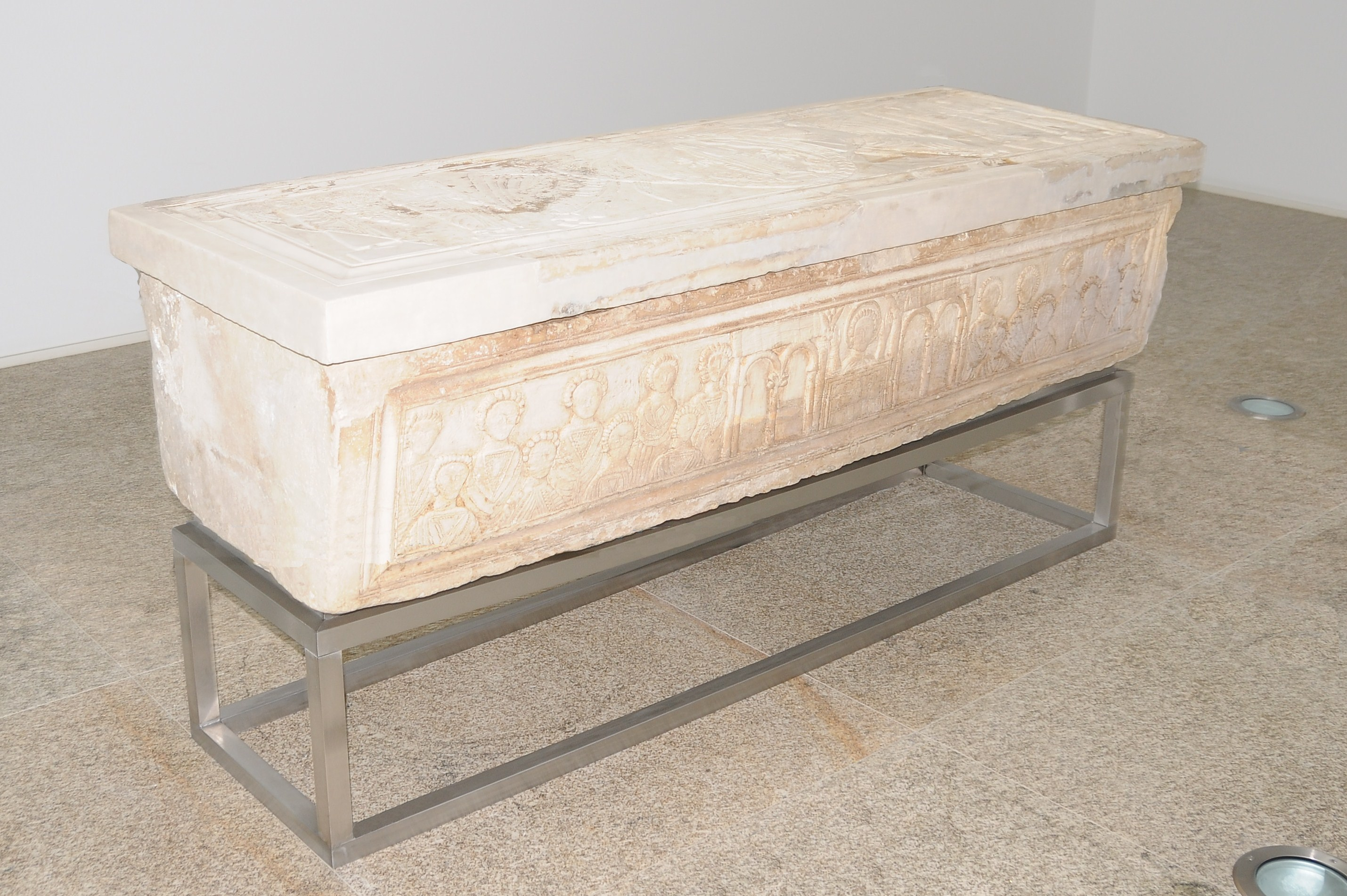
The tomb of Martin of Braga

The ruins are located around the Lugar da Igreja or Lugar do Assento on the square occupied by the parochial church of Dume. Occupying a rural landscape, the space is an ample property that include the Church of São Martinho de Dume, constituted by a central nucleus of the courtyard, the chapel of Nossa Senhora do Rosário and backyard of the Casa do Assento, on the same block occupied by the local cemetery.

The archaeological ruins in Dume encompass a complex of structures that include: a grande Roman villa (with a habitational zone) and bathhouse; remnants of a granite basilica in the form of a Latin cross (oriented east to west); with regularly horizontal aligned deposits in mortar, pavement and polychromatic mosaics; and a necropolis consisting of twelve graves, located in an area defined by granite slabs and/or brick coverage. These individual spaces were occupied successively over a 2000-year period.

== Sources ==
- Herbermann, Charles, ed. (1913). "St. Martin of Braga" . Catholic Encyclopedia. New York: Robert Appleton Company.
- Fletcher, R.A. (1984), Saint James's Catapult: The Life and Times of Diego Gelmírez of Santiago de Compostela, Library of Iberian Resources Online/American Academy of Research Historians of Medieval Spain/University of Central Arkansas
- Fontes, Luís Fernando de Oliveira (1987), "Salvamento Arqueológico de Dume – 1987: Primeiros Resultados", Cadernos de Arqueologia (PDF) (in Portuguese) (Série II ed.), Braga, Portugal: University of Minho, pp. 111–148
- Fontes, Luís Fernando de Oliveira (1988), "Dume: Devolução do Túmulo do Bispo de S. Martinho, a Ampliação da Igreja Paroquial e o Salvamento Arqueológico", Forum (in Portuguese), pp. 75–89
- Fontes, Luís Fernando de Oliveira (1991–92), "Salvamento Arqueológico de Dume (Braga). Resultados das Campanhas de 1989–90 e 1991–92", Cadernos de Arqueologia (in Portuguese), vol. 8–9 (Série II ed.), Braga, Portugal, pp. 199–230
- Fontes, Luís Fernando de Oliveira (1993), "Inventário de Sítios Arqueológicos do Concelho de Braga", in Mínia (in Portuguese) (3ª série ed.), pp. 39–43
- Dias-Encarnação, Marta (5 July 2006), "Arqueólogos redescobrem basílica de São Martinho", Diário do Minho (in Portuguese), p. 4
- Dias-Encarnação, Marta (10 July 2006), "Tiago, Basílica do século VI posta a descoberto em Braga", Público (in Portuguese), p. 34
- Pereira, Pedro Antunes (6 August 2006), "São Martinho volta à freguesia de Dume", Jornal de Notícias (in Portuguese), p. 66
