= Martin of Braga =

6th century Archbishop of Braga in Portugal

Saint Martin of Dume
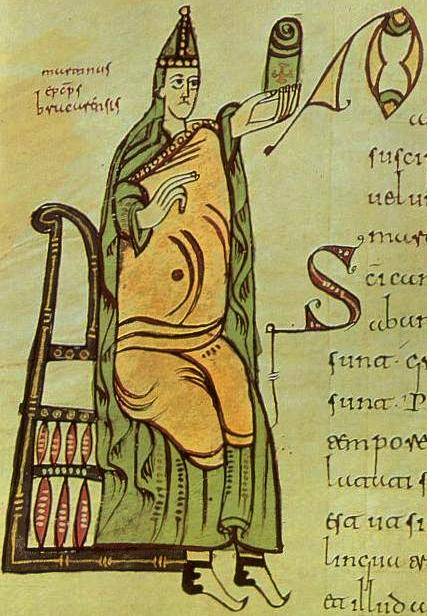
- Image of Saint Martin of Braga in a 10th-century manuscript.

Apostle of the Suevi Bishop of Dume Bishop of Braga
- Born: c. 518; Pannonia
- Died: 580 (age 62)
- Venerated in: Catholic Church; Eastern Orthodox Church
- Feast: 20 March

Martin of Dume (in Latin Martinus Bracarensis, in Portuguese, known as Martinho de Dume c. 518–580 AD), also known as Martin of Braga, was an archbishop of Bracara Augusta in Gallaecia (now Braga in Portugal), a missionary, a monastic founder, and an ecclesiastical author. According to his contemporary, the historian Gregory of Tours, Martin was plenus virtutibus ("full of virtue") and in tantum se litteris imbuit ut nulli secundus sui temporis haberetur ("he so instructed himself in learning that he was considered second to none in his lifetime"). He was later canonized by the Catholic Church for his work in converting the inhabitants of Gallaecia to Chalcedonian Christianity, being granted the cognomen of "Apostle to the Suevi". His feast day is 20 March.

== Life ==
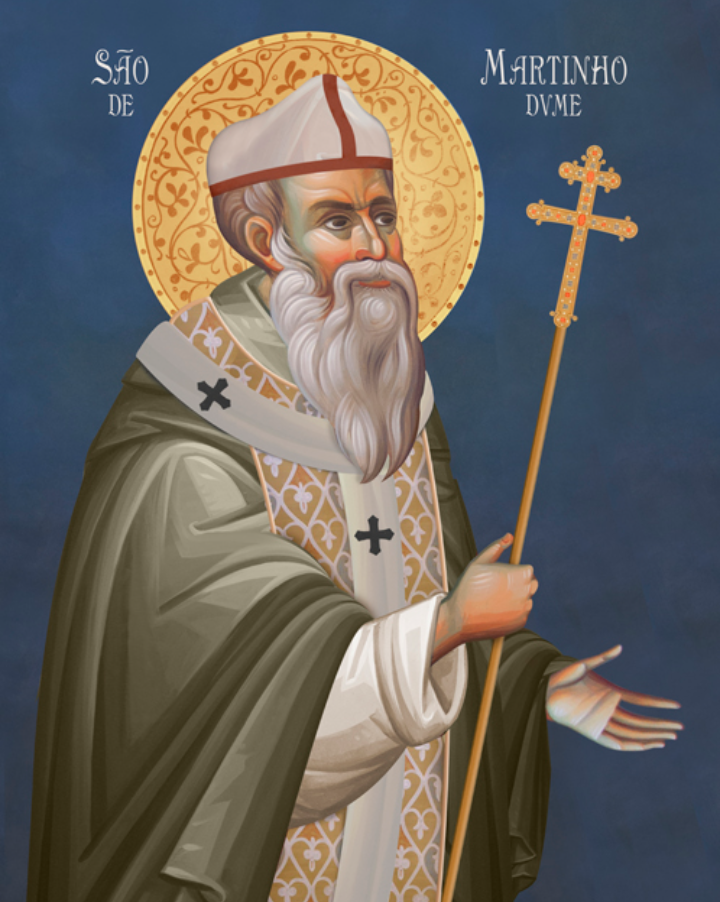
Eastern Orthodox Icon of St. Martin of Dume

Born in Pannonia, in Central Europe, Martin made a pilgrimage to the Holy Land, where he became a monk. Around 550, he travelled by sea to Hispania and settled in Gallaecia. "His intentions in going to a place so remote by the standards of his own day are unknown," writes Roger Collins. Though some scholars have suggested that he was an agent of Byzantine diplomacy (owing to the coincidence between his date of travel and the beginnings of the Byzantine reconquest of parts of Visigothic south-eastern Hispania), and others have suggested he was sent to the Suevic court as a missionary, neither hypothesis is certain.

Nonetheless, his arrival in Gallaecia was historically significant, for he played an important role in converting the Suevi from their current Arian beliefs to the Chalcedonian Christianity. While there he founded several monasteries, the best known of which was at Dumium (modern-day Dume), established close to the Suevic capital at Braga. He became bishop of this monastic bishopric and attended the First Council of Braga in 561 in this capacity. He was subsequently raised to the status of metropolitan bishop of Braga some point before the Second Council of Braga, over which he presided in 572, near the end of his life. He played a central role in the reorganization of the church in the Suevic kingdom.

== Works ==
Martin of Dume was a prolific author. Besides his contributions to the two provincial councils, produced numerous translations from Greek and original Latin works. He translated from Greek into Latin a collection of 109 Sayings of the Desert Fathers, producing a collection known as the Sententiae patrum Aegyptiorum. Meanwhile, at Martin's instigation, the monk Paschasius of Dumium translated a larger collection of sayings, which he titled Liber geronticon and dedicated to Martin. Martin also produced a large collection of church canons, mostly translated from Greek. These were presented to the Suevic church at the Second Council of Braga.

In the final decade of his life he composed two short treatises, De ira and Formula vitae honestae, which drew heavily on the work of Seneca the Younger. "Martin's tract are valuable evidence that some at least of Seneca's writings were still available in the land of his birth in the sixth century," writes Laistner. Three other short essays on ethics demonstrate his clear familiarity with the works of John Cassian.

Another important work is his model sermon, written in the form of a letter to his fellow bishop Polemius of Asturica, De correctione rusticorum, which discusses the issue of rural paganism. Noting that this sermon has often been seen as evidence of Martin's missionary work against rural paganism, Collins asserts that a closer look does not support this thesis, for "there are no points of contact [in this work] with what is known of the indigenous pre-Christian cults of rural Galicia." The influences present in this work have been debated: Laistner sees evidence of the sermons of the Gallic bishop Caesarius of Arles, who lived a generation ago; Collins believes it is modelled on a treatise of Augustine of Hippo on the same topic.

Martin also composed poetry; Gregory of Tours notes that he authored the verses over the southern portal of the church of Saint Martins of Tours in that city.

=== Moral treatises ===
- Formula vitae honestae or De quattuor virtutibus (Rules for an Honest Life, or On the Four Cardinal Virtues): addressed to Miro, king of the Sueves, it gave an account of the four cardinal virtues, derivied from ancient philosophy. Due to its similarities to other works of Seneca the Younger, some modern scholars believe that Martin adapted his work from a lost writing of Seneca, in the same way as was done in De ira. By the twelfth century the work circulated widely without Martin's dedicatory preface, causing scribes and readers mistakenly to identify the treatise as a genuine work by Seneca. As such, over the next three centuries, Formula vitae honestae was used alongside the pseudo-epigraphic correspondence of Paul and Seneca as proof for Seneca's adherence to Christianity.
- (572) De ira (On Anger): adapted from a work of the same name by Seneca.
- Three linked treatises: the two vices, vanity and pride, are taken from a list of eight set out by John Cassian.
  - Pro repellenda iactantia (Driving Away Vanity)
  - De superbia (On Pride)
  - Exhortatio humilitatis (Exhortation to Humility)

=== Councils and canons ===
- (561) First Council of Braga
- (572) Second Council of Braga
- (572) Canons of St. Martin: appended to the text of the Second Council. These a collection of eighty-four canons translated by Martin from the (Greek and Egyptian) canons of the Eastern church.
- (570?) De Pascha (On Easter): part of the Canons of St. Martin and the Second Council of Braga De Pascha is Martin's explanation on how to calculate the date of Easter. According to Martin, Easter may be observed no earlier than March 22, and no later than April 21, and the date may be announced during Advent so the people may know when Lent begins.

=== Other works and treatises ===
- De correctione rusticorum (On the Reform of Rustics)
- De trina mersione (On Triple Immersion): addressed to Bishop Boniface, of whom little is known other than that he resided in sixth century Visigothic Iberia. In his letter, Martin denounces the Arian practice of performing baptism in the three names of the Trinity. Martin insists the correct practice is to perform triple immersion in the Trinity's single name.
- Sententiae Patrum Aegyptiorum (Saying of the Egyptian Fathers): translated by Martin from an anonymous Greek manuscript he carried with him to Iberia. Two translations exist: one by the monk Paschasius, who was instructed in Greek by Martin, and one by Martin himself. The version by Martin is twenty-two sections shorter than Paschasius's, as most of the anecdotes about the daily life of the Egyptian ascetic monks were removed to focus on their moral instruction.
- Poetry: only three poems by Martin are preserved from history. Two of them are inscriptions for buildings, and the third is a six-line epitaph about Martin's own life.

== De correctione rusticorum ==
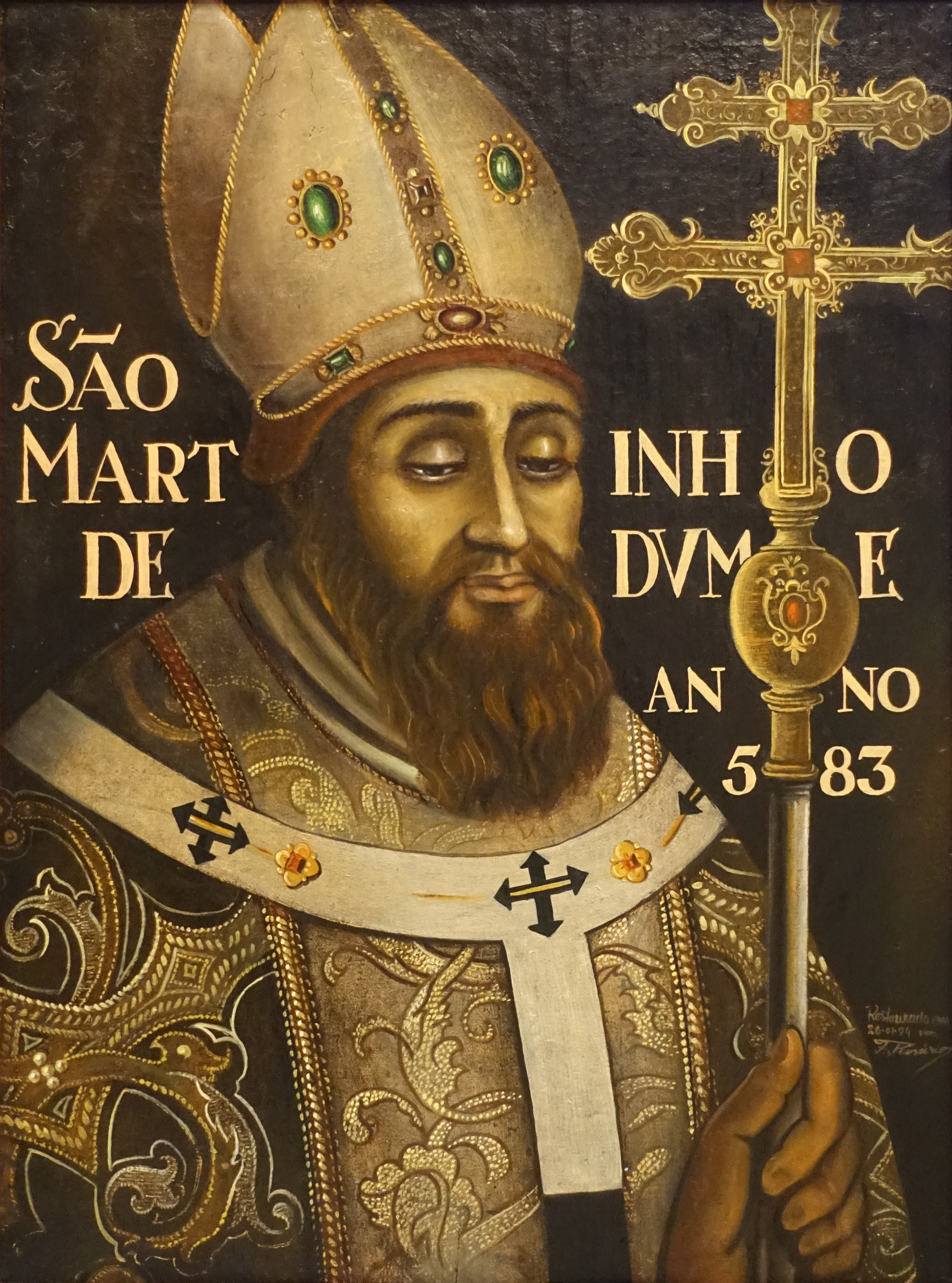
Martin, Archbishop of Braga

In 572, the Second Council of Braga decreed that bishops are to call the people of their church together, so they may be converted to Christianity. After the council, a bishop named Polemius of Astorga wrote to Martin of Dume asking for advice on the conversion of rural pagans. Polemius was especially concerned about their perceived idolatry and sin. Martin's reply was a treatise in the form of a sermon, enclosed in his responding letter to Polemius.

Out of all of Martin's works, De correctione rusticorum (On the Reform of Rustics) is of particular interest to modern scholars. It contains both a detailed catalogue of sixth-century Iberian pagan practices, and an unusually tolerant approach to them by Martin. Alberto Ferreiro attributes Martin's acceptance to his classical education in the East, as well as the influence of philosophers like Seneca and Plato. Martin himself had avoided religious suppression by traveling to Dumium, in what is now Portugal. He had sailed east around 550, during the period when Justinian I was attempting to reunite the Later Roman Empire through consolidation of the empire's faith. In 529, Justinian had placed the Neoplatonic Academy under state control, effectively signifying the end of pagan philosophical teaching. Later, in 553, Origen was also anathematized, effectively crushing Origenism. The Codex Justinianus enforced Nicaean Christianity over all other rival doctrines. Martin may have chosen to flee east to avoid Rome's anti-intellectual policies, which possible explains his relatively gentle approach to the Suevi in Gallaecia.

Although Martin's training as a monk was based on the ascetic Desert Fathers of the Egyptian desert, he lessened their severe monastic regulations to aid the Iberians to adapt. When converting the Suevi, he avoided enforcing Catholicism, preferring persuasion over coercion. He also wrote his sermon in a deliberately rustic style, incorporating ungrammatical Latin constructions and local vulgarisms. (Note: From De correctione rusticorum: "Sed quia oportet ab initio mundi vel modicam illis rationis notitiam quasi pro gustu porrigere, necesse me fuit ingentem praeteritorum temporum gestorumque silvam breviato tenuis compendii sermone contingere et cibum rusticis rustico sermone condire." "Since it is necessary to offer them some small explanation for these idols' existence from the beginning of the world to whet the appetite, as it were, I have had to touch upon a vast forest of past times and events in a treatise of very brief compass and to offer the rustics food seasoned with rustic speech.")

In his instructions, Martin objects to the astrological custom of naming the days of the week after gods (planets). (Note: From De correctione rusticorum: "for the infidels have angered God and do not believe wholeheartedly in the faith of Christ, but are such disbelievers that they place the very names of the demons on each day of the week, and speak of the day of Mars and of Mercury and of Jupiter and of Venus and of Saturn, who never created a day, but were evil and wicked men among the race of the Greeks.") Due to his influence Portuguese and Galician (which, at the time, were one single language), alone among the Romance languages, assumed names for the days from numbers and Catholic liturgy, rather than from pagan deities. Galician has largely returned to the earlier nomenclature.
