= Second Council of Braga =

The Second Council of Braga, held in 572, presided over by Martin of Braga, was held to increase the number of bishops in Galaecia. Twelve bishops assisted at this council, and ten decrees were promulgated: (1) that the bishops should in their visitations see in what manner the priests celebrated the Holy Sacrifice and administered baptism and the other sacraments, thanking God if they found everything as it should be, and instructing the priests if they were found wanting in knowledge, and obliging all catechumens to attend instructions for twenty days before baptism and to learn the creed; (2) that the bishop must not be tyrannical towards his priests; (3-4) that no fee must be accepted for Holy orders, and the holy chrism must be distributed free; (5-6) that the bishop must not ask a fee for consecrating a church, that no church should be consecrated without the bishop being sure of the endowment of the ministers, and that no church built on private property for the purpose of emolument should receive consecration; (8) that if a cleric should accuse any one of unchastity without the evidence of two or three witnesses he should be excommunicated; (9) that the metropolitan should announce the date of Easter, and have it made known to the people after Christmas, so that they might be prepared for the beginning of Lent, when litanies were to be recited for three days; on the third day the Lenten fast should be announced after the Mass; (10) that any one saying Mass without fasting, as many did, as a result of Priscillianist tendencies, should be deprived of his office. This council was attended by the bishops of the suffragan sees of Braga, and by those of the Diocese of Lugo, and Pope Innocent III removed all doubt as to its authenticity.

== See also ==
- Councils of Braga

== Sources ==
- Ferreiro, Alberto. "Braga and Tours: Some Observations on Gregory's De virtutibus sancti Martini." Journal of Early Christian Studies. 3 (1995), p. 195–210.
- Thompson, E. A. "The Conversion of the Spanish Suevi to Catholicism." Visigothic Spain: New Approaches. ed. Edward James. Oxford: Oxford University Press, 1980. ISBN 0-19-822543-1.
