= Seventh Council of Toledo =

The Seventh Council of Toledo commenced on 18 November 646 and was attended by 41 bishops either personally or by delegation. It was the first of Chindasuinth's two councils.

The law against treason was strengthened with the addition of a penalty of excommunication on offenders. This was partially in response to the will of the king, who had recently taken vigorous actions against supposed traitors. The mass executions were upheld as just by the council. The punishments for treason were extended to clergy without distinction.

It was also determined that if any clergyman, regardless of rank, travelled to a foreign land to support activities contra the king or the Visigothic nobility, or to assist a layman in doing the same, he was to be disgraced and made a permanent penitent, receiving communion only on his deathbed.

== Sources ==
- Thompson, E. A. (1969) The Goths in Spain. Oxford: Clarendon Press.
- Synodus Toletana septima, minutes from the Collectio Hispana Gallica Augustodunensis (Vat. lat. 1341)
