= Eighth Council of Toledo =

The Eighth Council of Toledo commenced on 16 December 653 in the church of the Holy Apostles in Toledo in Spain. It was attended by fifty two bishops in person, including the aged Gavinio of Calahorra, who had assisted at the Fourth Council, and another ten by delegation, ten abbots, including Saint Ildefonsus, abbot of Agali monastery, and by the archpriest and primicerius of the cathedral. Also, for the first time, secular officials, sixteen counts palatine, participated in the discussion, voting, and affirmation of the council's acts.

This was the second of King Chindasuinth's two councils, held under the names of both he and his co-reigning son, Reccesuinth. The eighth council was unique in its convocation in that Chindasuinth had written a tomus to the bishops describing the issues he wished them to address.

The acts of this council chiefly concerned ecclesiastical discipline and civil law.
