= List of Bienes de Interés Cultural in the Province of A Coruña =

This is an incomplete list of Bien de Interés Cultural landmarks in the Province of A Coruña, Spain.

Name	Description	Location	Image	Notes
Castillo de Beldoña	castle	Abegondo		
Castillo de Porcas	castle	Abegondo		
Castle of Santa Cruz	castle	Oleiros		
Castro de Elviña	ruin	San Vicente de Elviña		
Cathedral of Santiago de Compostela	cathedral	Santiago de Compostela		
Church of Santa María la Real del Sar	church	Santiago de Compostela		
Church of Santiago de Mens	church	Malpica de Bergantiños		
Convento de San Domingos de Bonaval	convent	Santiago de Compostela		
Dolmen de Axeitos	dolmen	Axeitos		
Ferrol Naval Base	naval base	Ferrol		
Hospital de los Reyes Católicos	hostel	Santiago de Compostela		Now a hotel
Iglesia de San Antolín de Toques	church	Toques		
Iglesia de San Jorge (A Coruña)	church	A Coruña		
Iglesia de Santa María de Cambre	church	Cambre	Iglesia de Santa María de Cambre	
Iglesia de Santiago (A Coruña)	church	A Coruña		
Monastery of Santa María de Mezonzo	monastery	Vilasantar		
Monastery of Xuvia	monastery	Narón		
Monfero Abbey	abbey	Monfero		
O Eume	historical site	O Eume		
Pazo de Hermida	manor house	Dodro		
Pazo de Meirás	manor house	Sada		
Pazo de Ortigueira	manor house	Vedra		
Pazo das Torres do Allo	manor house	Zas		
Saint John of Caaveiro	monastery	Pontedeume		
Sobrado Abbey	abbey	Sobrado		
Torre de Cerca	tower	Abegondo		
Torre de Figueroa	tower	Abegondo		
Tower of Hercules	tower	A Coruña	Tower of Hercules	
