= Blind arcade =

Architectural element

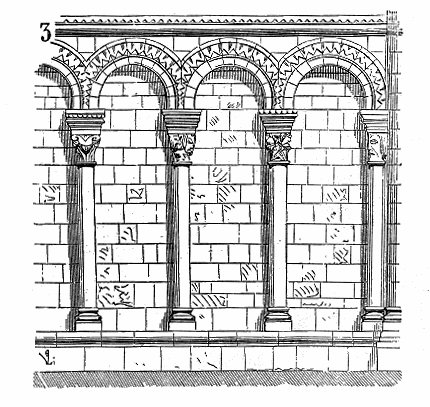
A blind arcade in Vézelay Abbey, France

A blind arcade, also called a blank arcade, is an arcade (a series of arches) that lacks actual openings and is applied to the surface of a wall as a decorative element; that is, the arches are not openings, but form part of the masonry façade. It is designed as an ornamental architectural element, without any load-bearing function.

== Similar structures ==
Whereas a blind arch is usually a single arch or a series of joined arches as a frieze (sometimes called Lombard band), a blind arcade is composed of a series of arches that have well-defined columns in between its arches.

A blind arcade may resemble several blind windows (false/blank windows or sealed-up windows) or blind niches that are side by side.

== Examples ==
Blind arcades are a common decorative features on the facades of Romanesque and Gothic buildings throughout Western Europe, and are also a common feature in Byzantine Orthodox churches in Eastern Europe, and in Armenian churches.

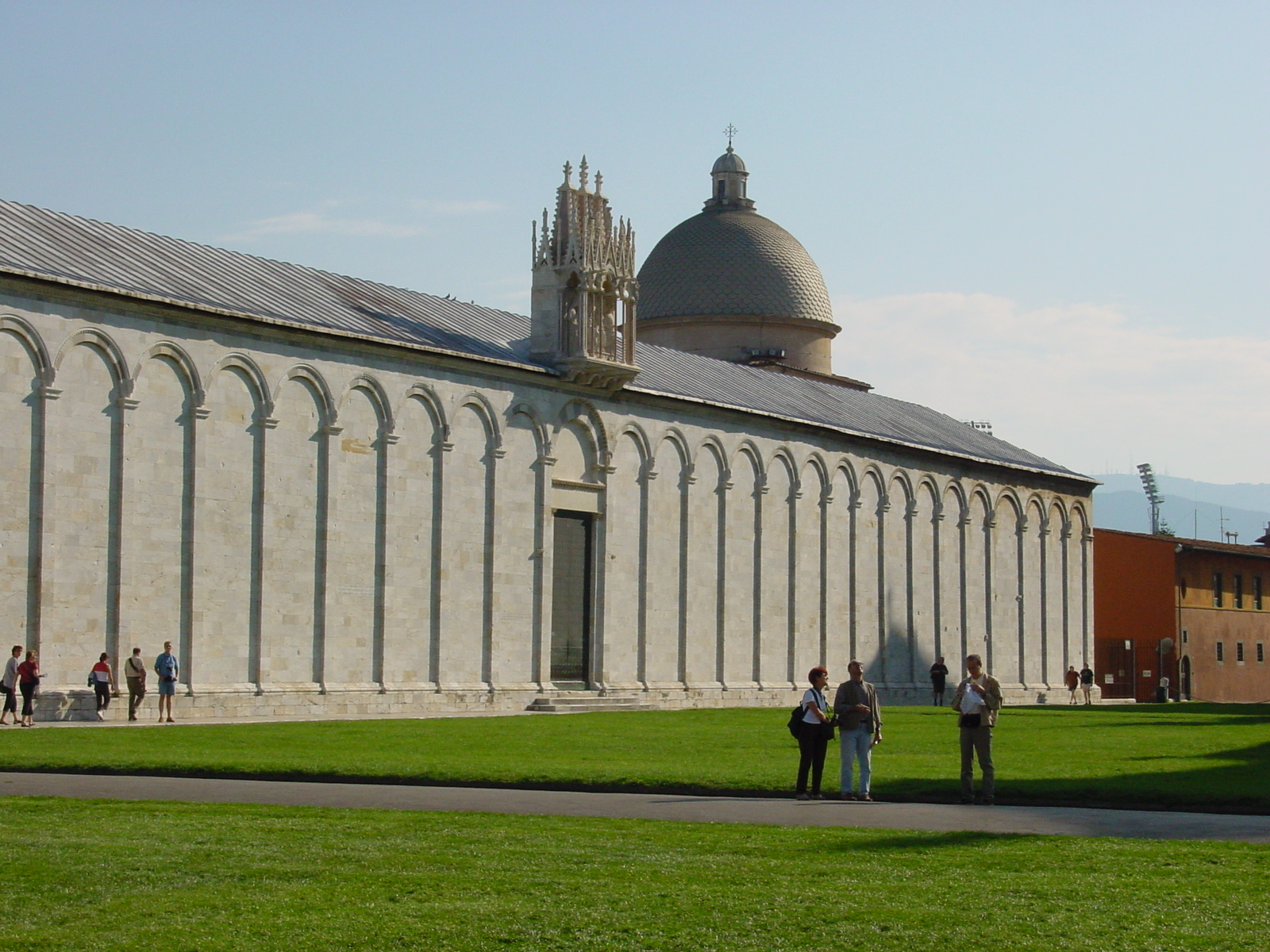
Camposanto Monumentale,
Pisa, Italy

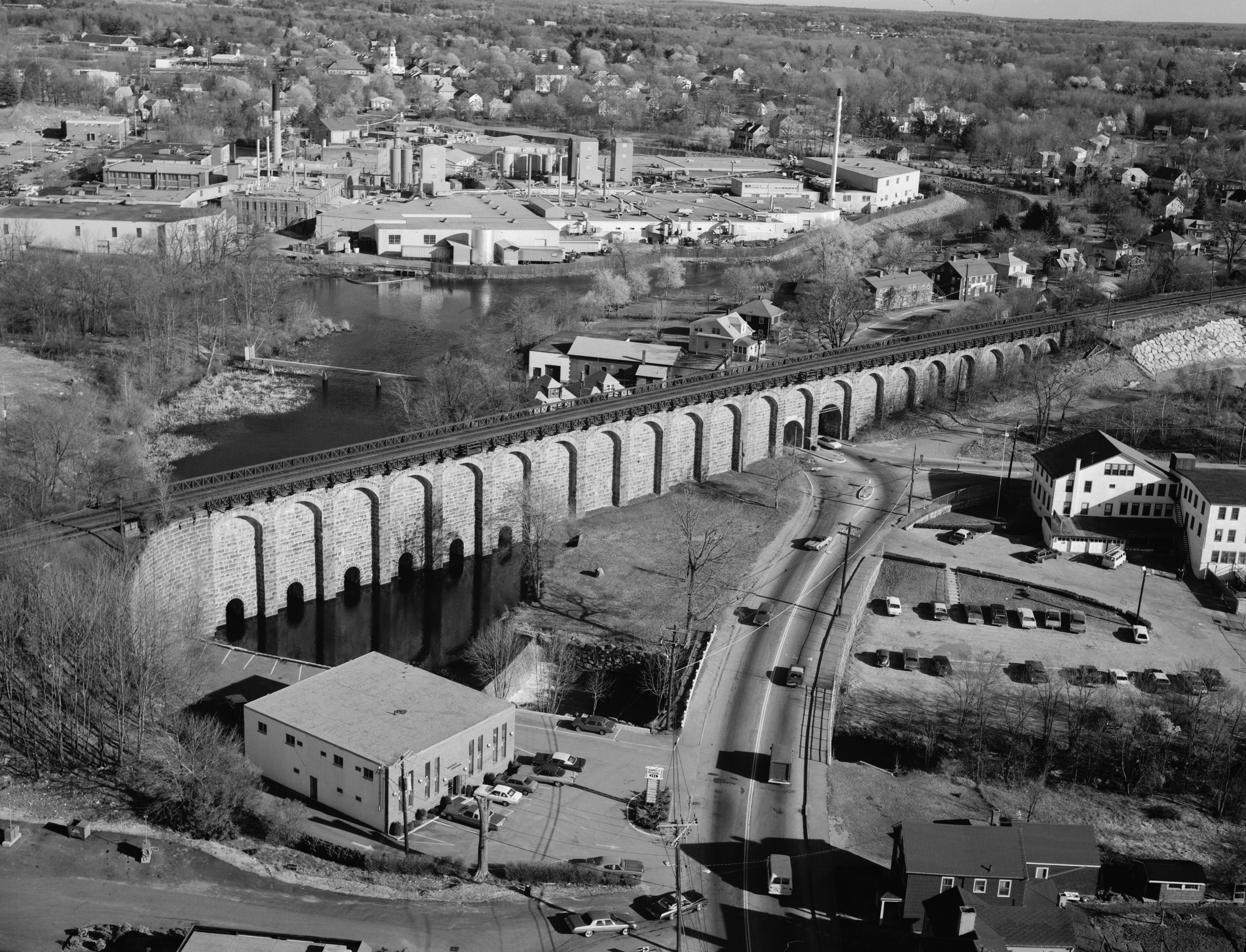
Canton Viaduct,
Canton, Massachusetts, USA

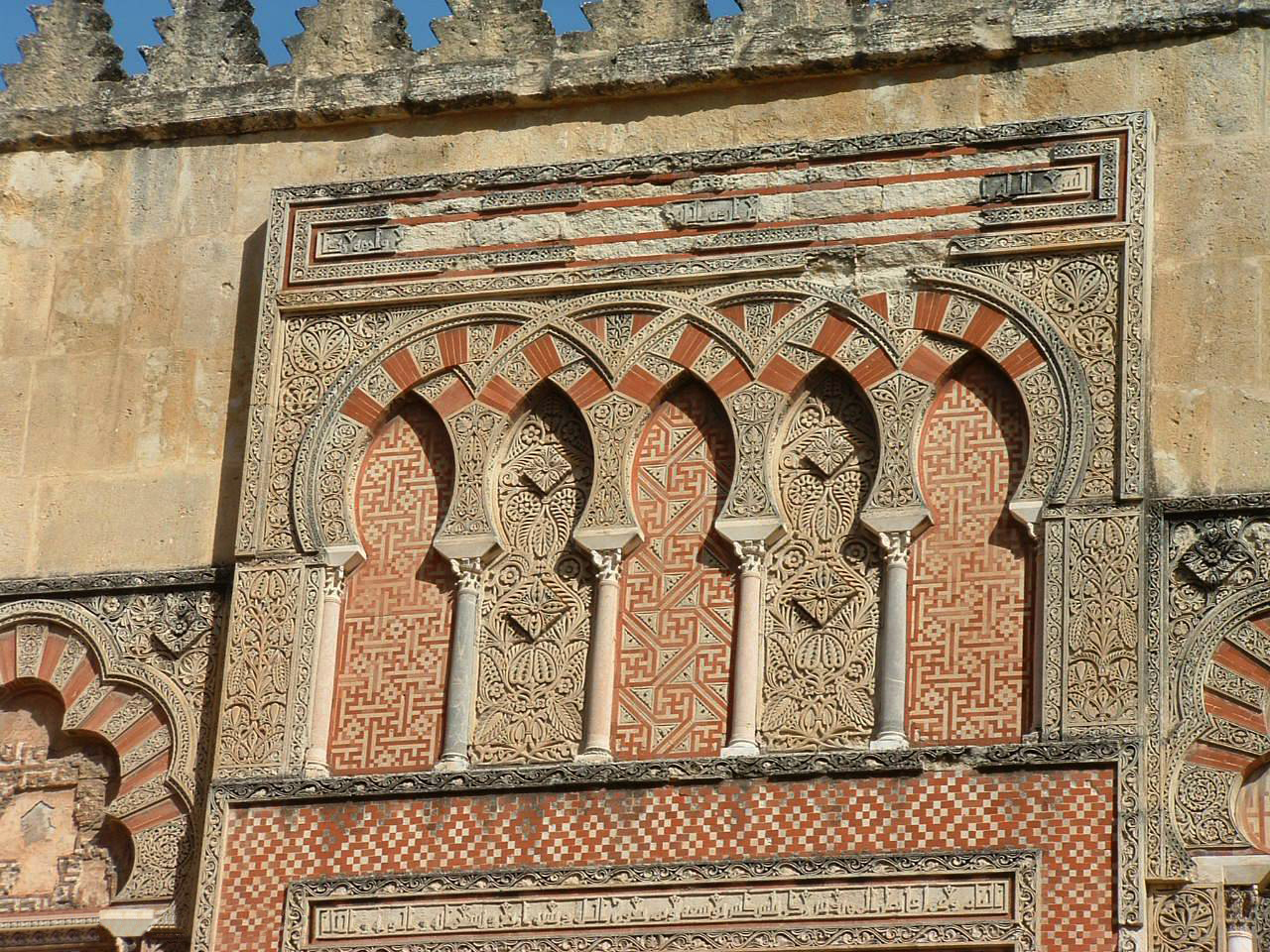
Córdoba, Spain

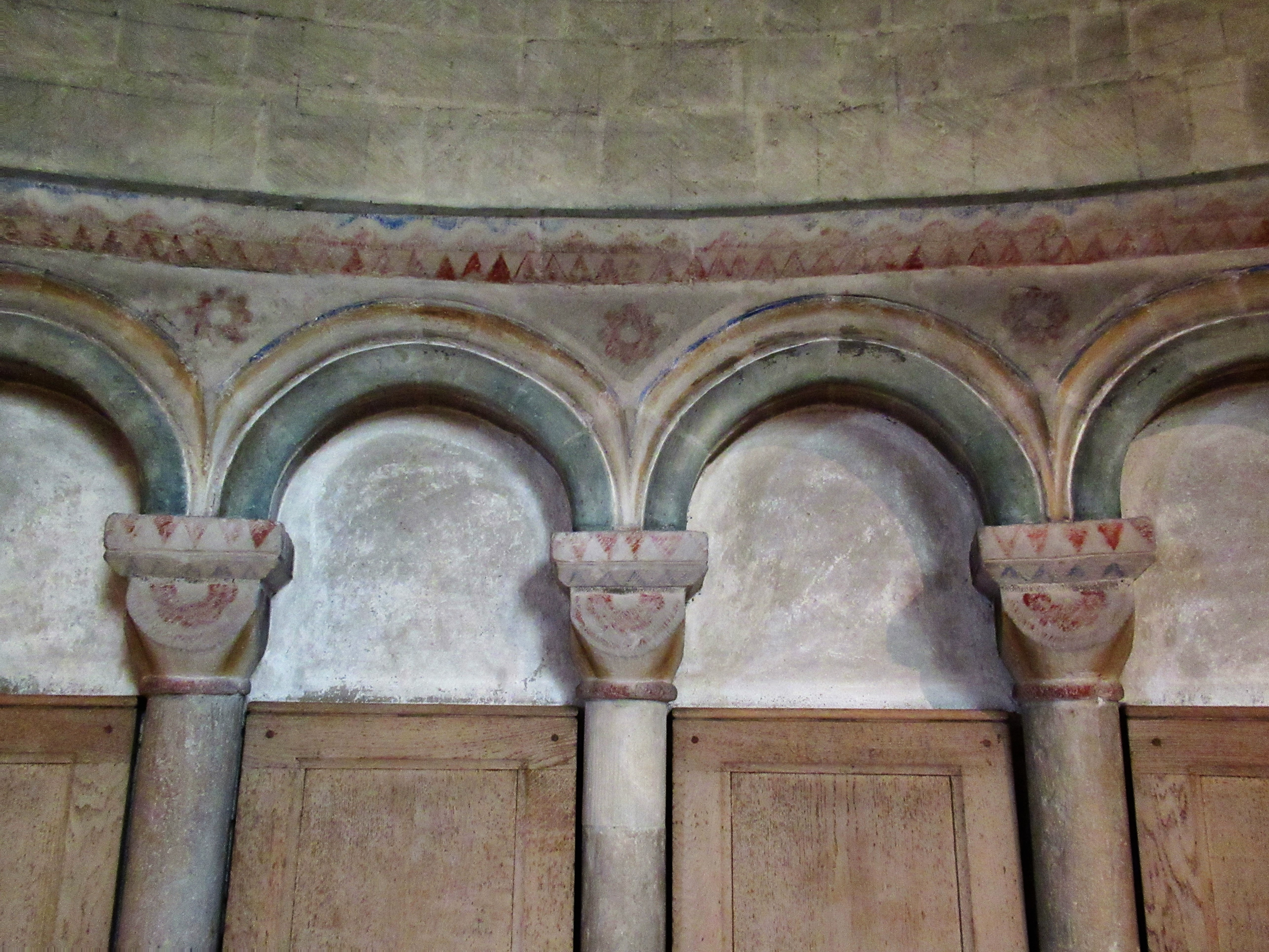
Norwich Cathedral, Norfolk, United Kingdom

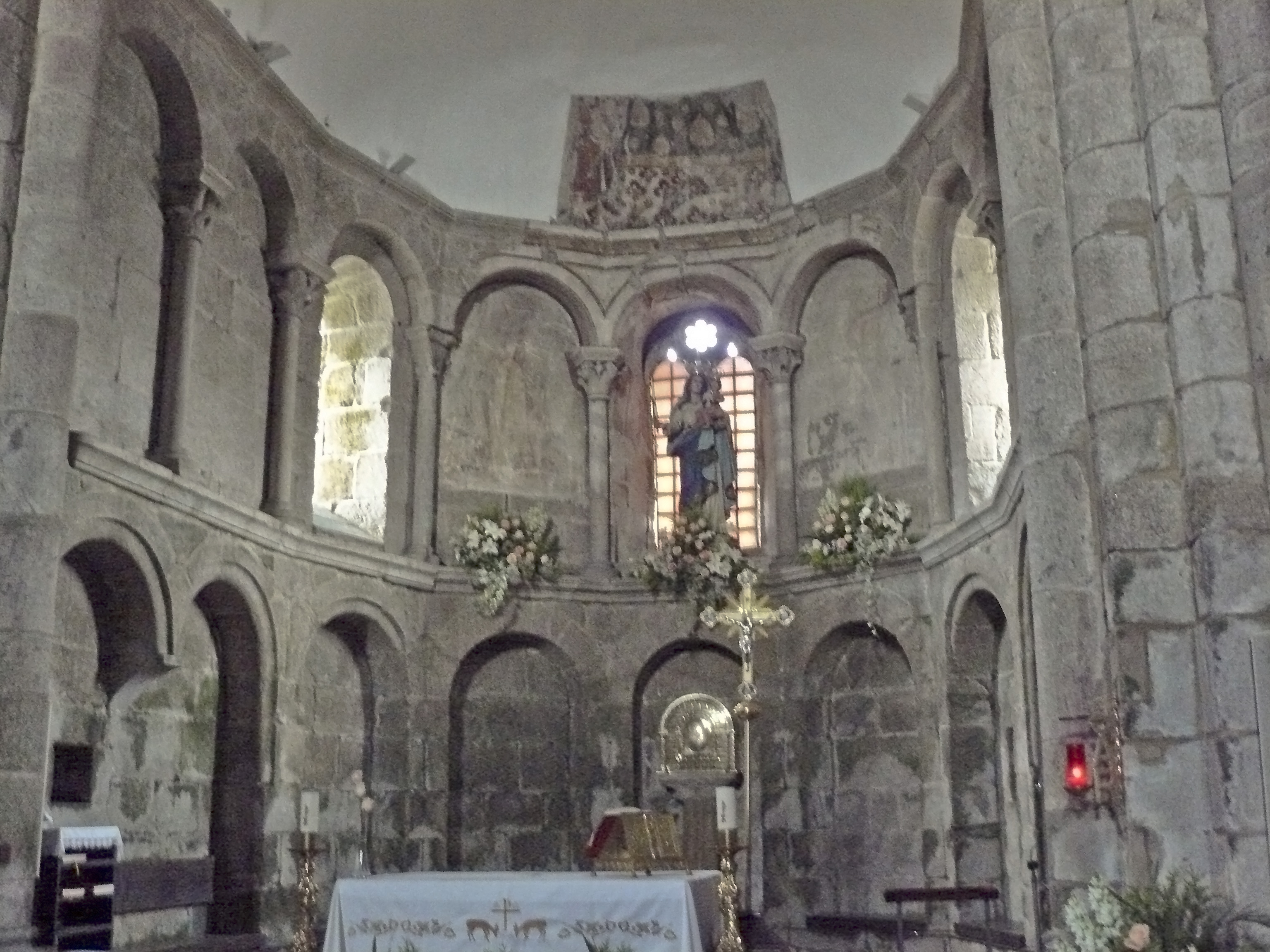
Apse interior of Church of Santa María a Real do Sar,
Santiago de Compostela, Spain

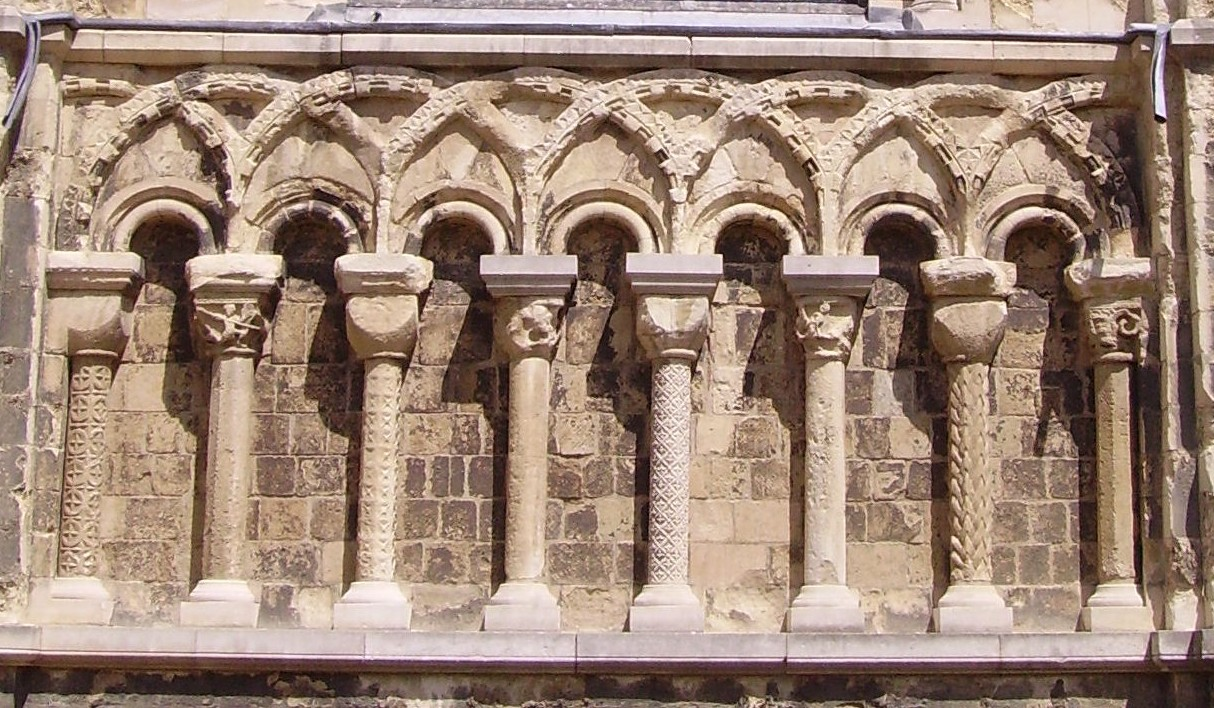
Canterbury Cathedral, England (interlaced arches)

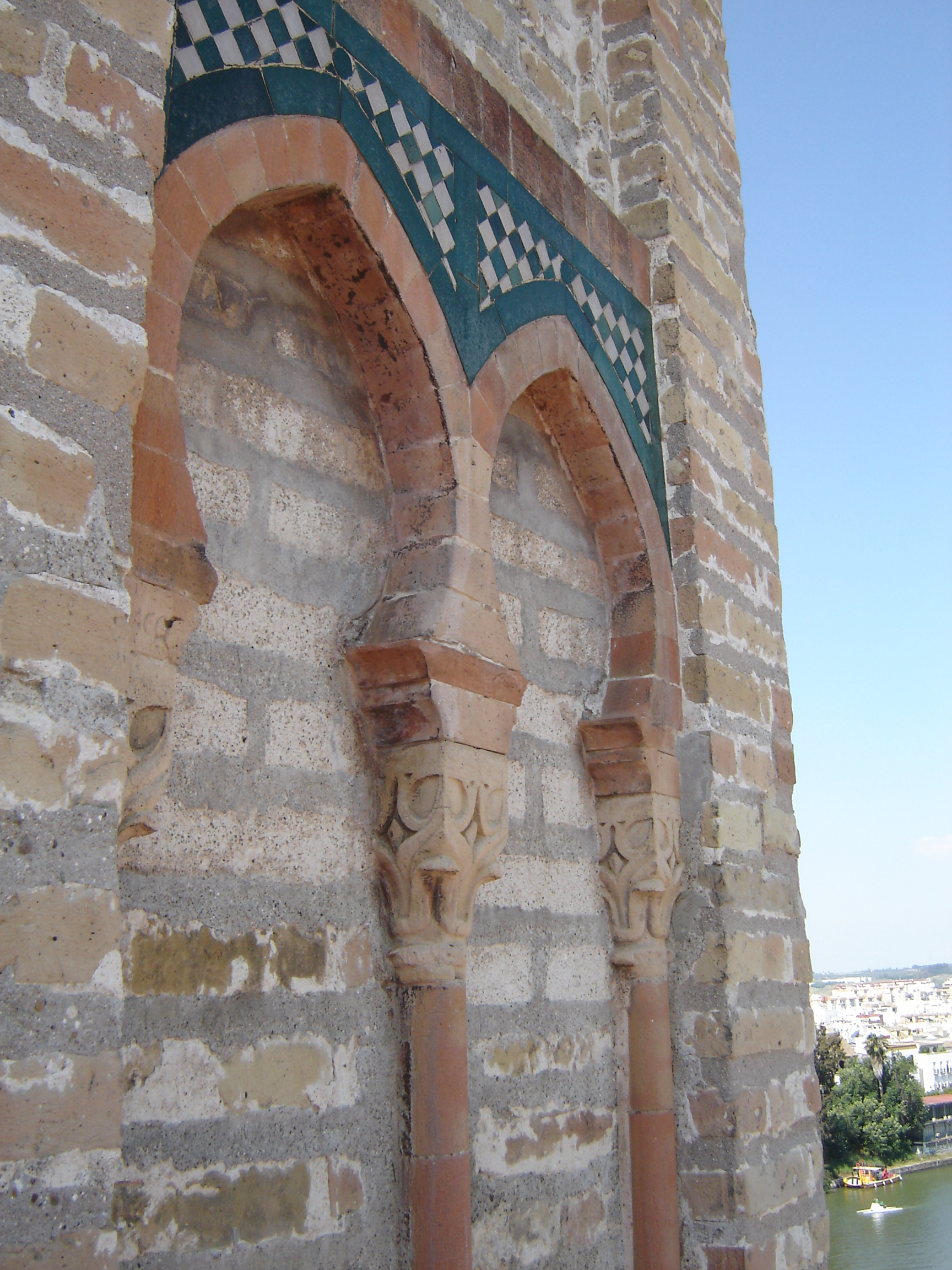
Torre del Oro,
Seville, Spain

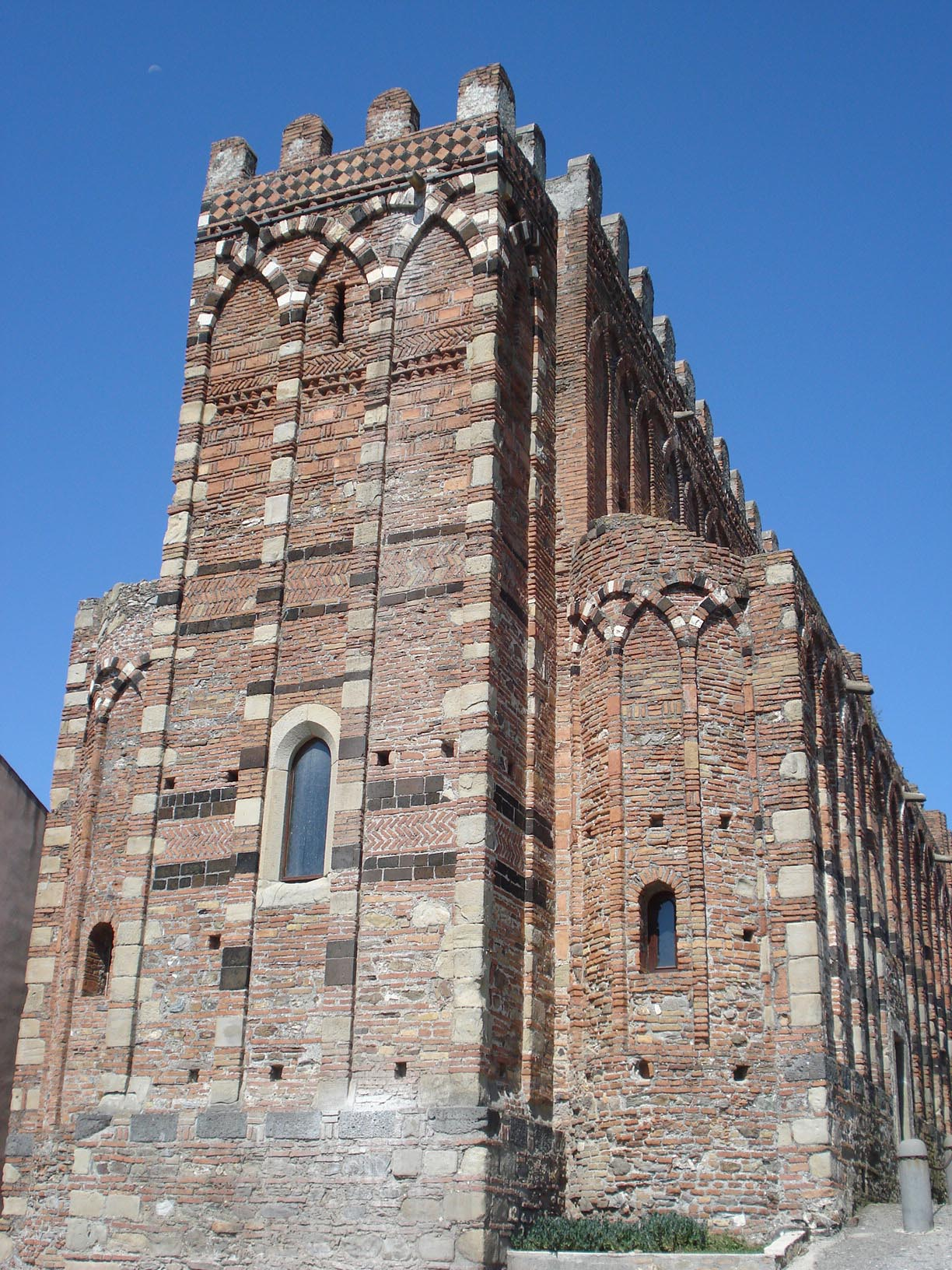
Apse exterior of Norman church of Santi Pietro e Paolo d'Agrò,
Casalvecchio Siculo, Sicily

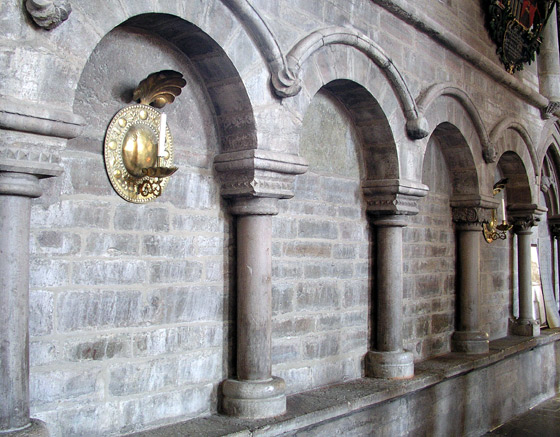
Linköping Cathedral, Sweden

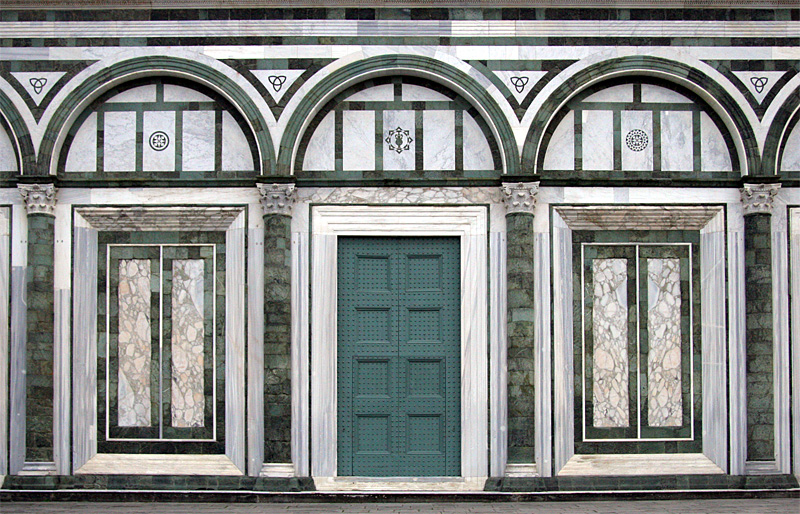
San Miniato al Monte,
Florence, Italy

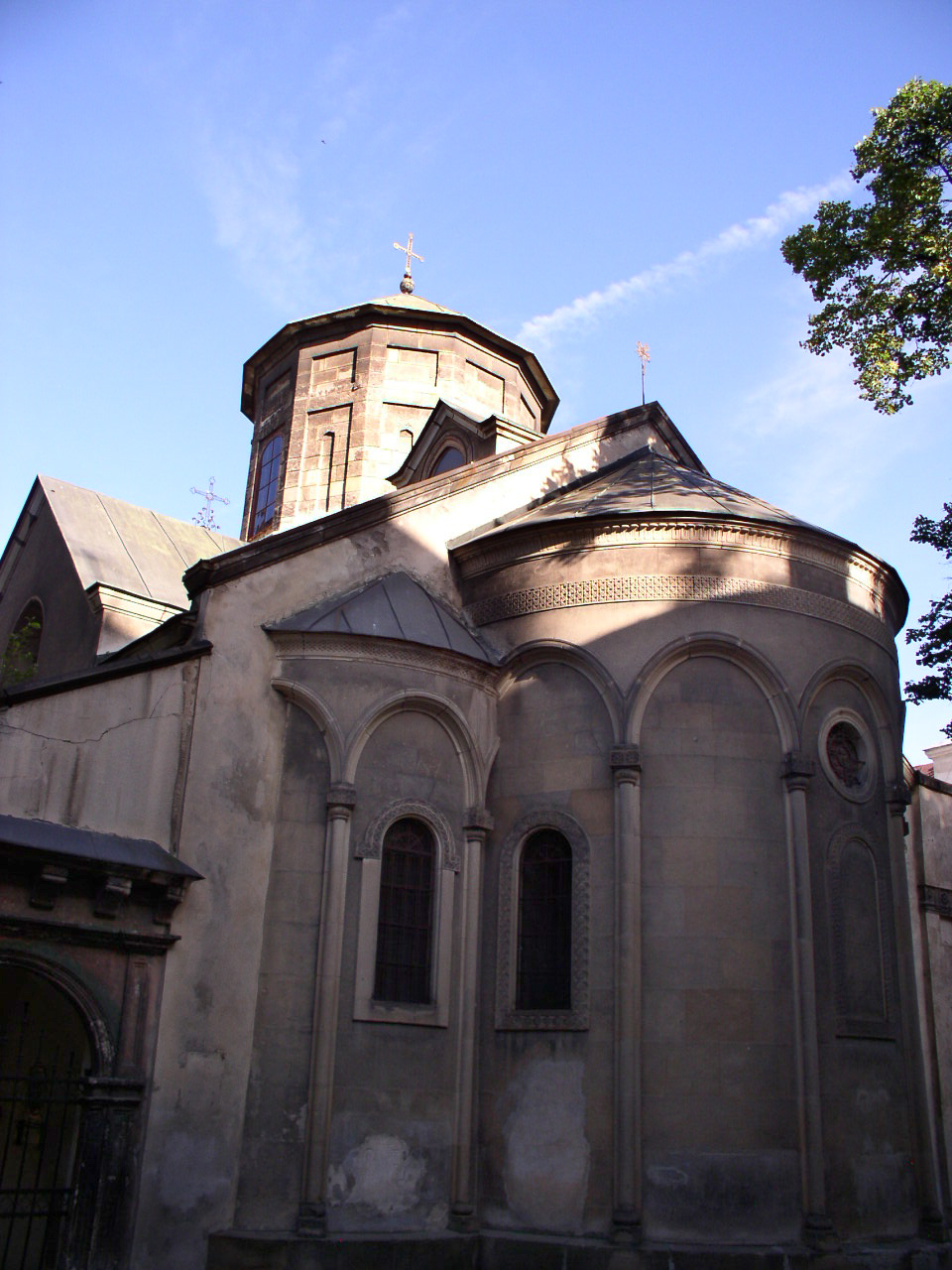
Armenian church,
Lviv, Ukraine

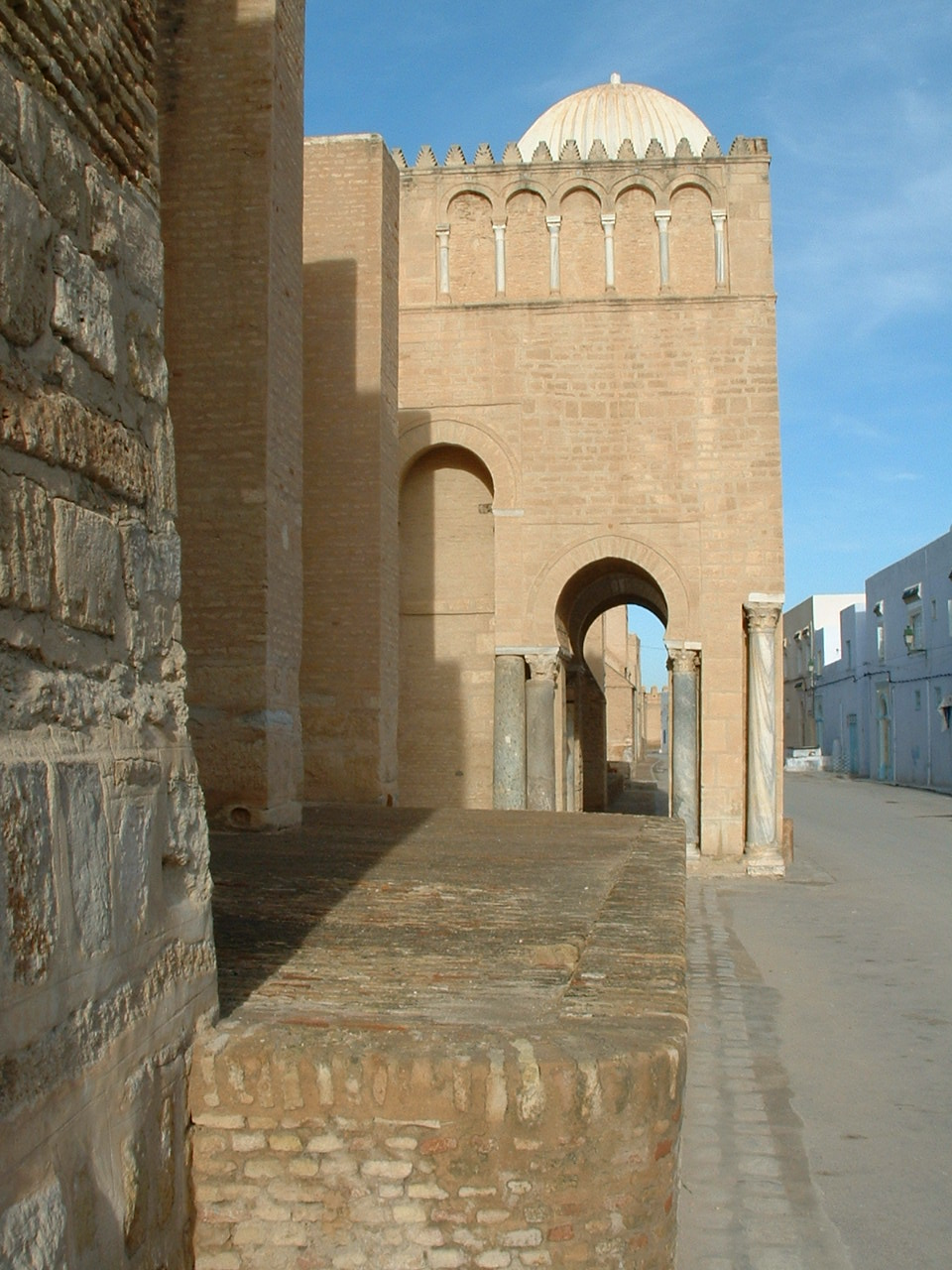
Great Mosque of Kairouan (Mosque of Uqba), Tunisia

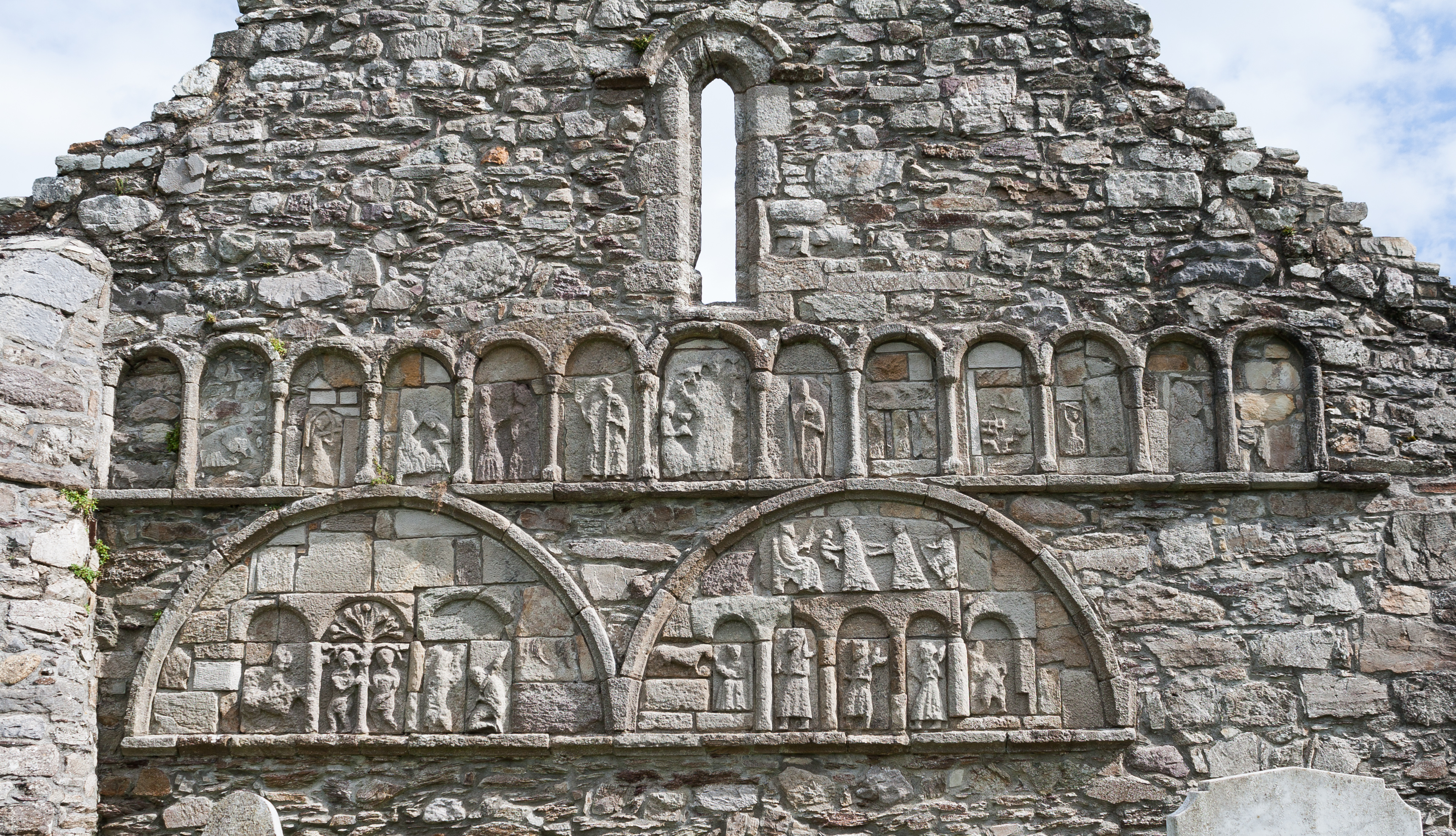
Blind arcade on Ardmore Cathedral, Ireland, with sculpted Biblical scenes (12th century)

== See also ==
- Dwarf gallery
- Engaged column
- Flying buttress
