= Carballo =

- Municipality
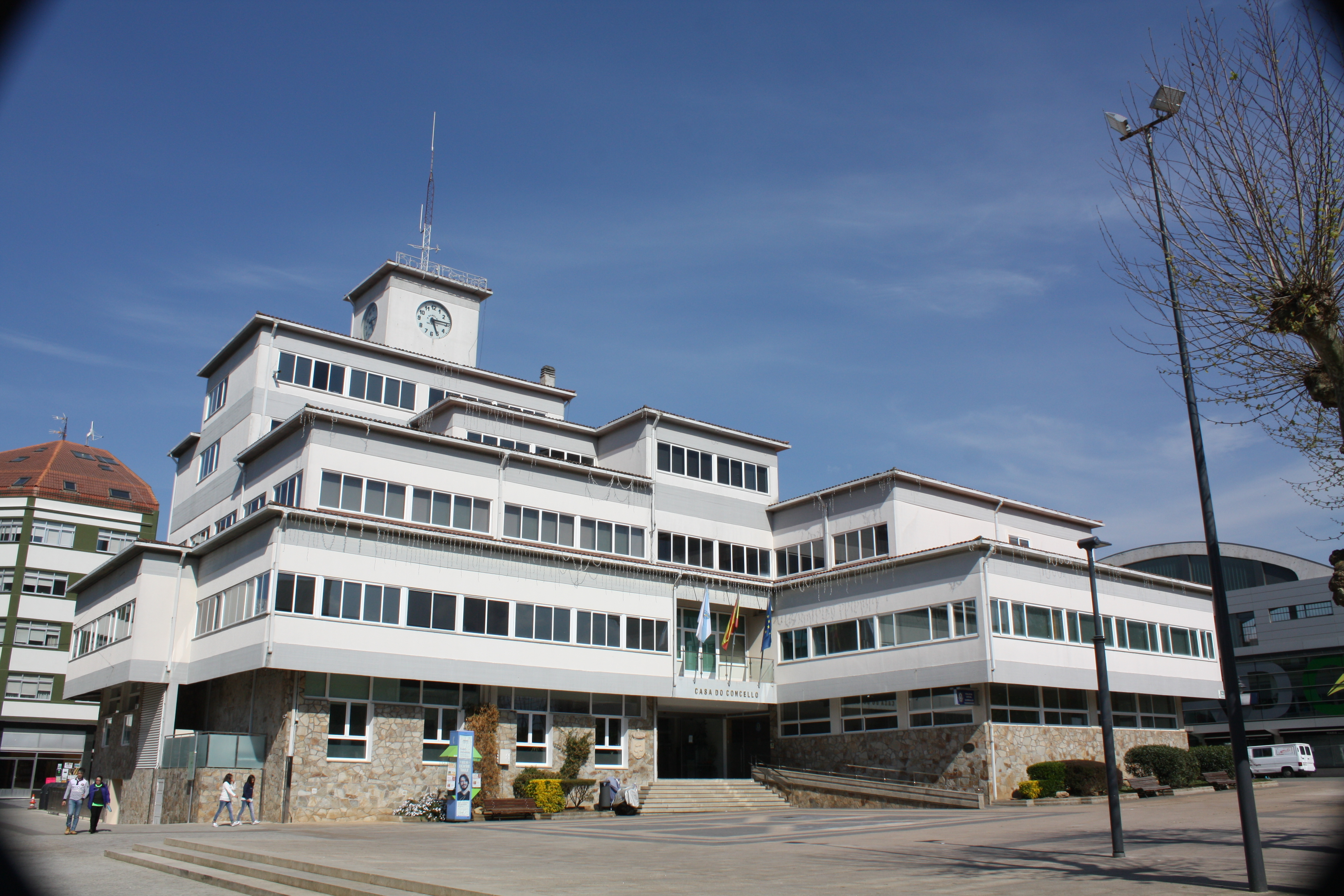
- Town hall.

- Flag Coat of arms

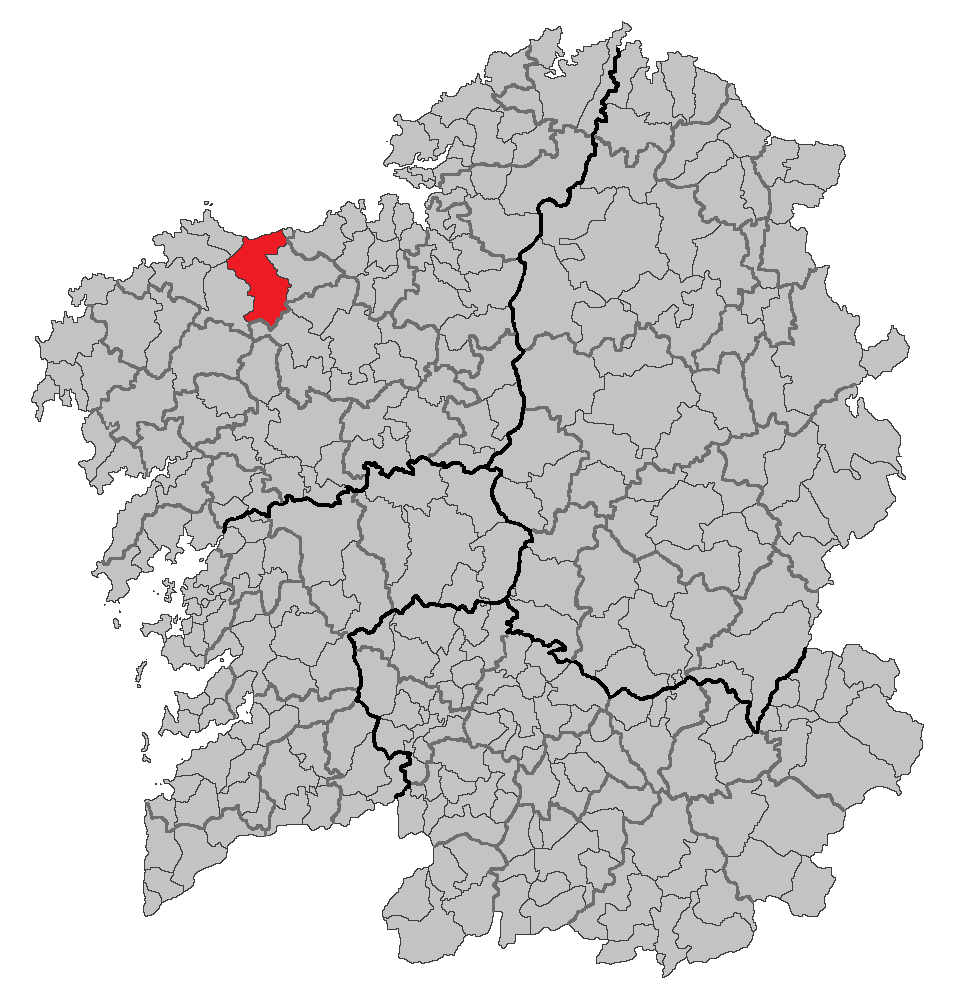
- Location of Carballo

- Location in Spain
- Coordinates: 43°13′0″N 8°41′0″W
- Country: Spain
- Autonomous Community: Galicia
- Province: A Coruña
- Comarca: Bergantiños

Government
  - Alcalde: Evencio Ferrero Rodríguez (BNG)

Area
  - Total: 186.09 km^{2} (71.85 sq mi)
- Elevation: 106 m (348 ft)

Population (2025-01-01)
  - Total: 32,120
  - Density: 172.6/km^{2} (447.0/sq mi)
- Demonym(s): Carballés, carballesa
- Time zone: UTC+1 (CET)
  - Summer (DST): UTC+2 (CEST)
- Postal code: 15100
- Dialing code: 981
- Website: Official website

Carballo is a municipality in the province of A Coruña, in the autonomous community of Galicia, in northwestern Spain. The town is the thirteenth most populated municipality in the region and it belongs to the comarca of Bergantiños, serving as its capital.

The seafood company Calvo is headquartered here.

== Etymology ==
Carballo is a Galician word that refers to Oak trees, which are the main symbol of the municipality. However, the word Carballo has many historical variations in spelling, including but not limited to Carvallo, Carbello, Caballero or Carvalho, likely due to the level of illiteracy during early times. Surnames like Carballo transform in their pronunciation and spelling as they travel across villages, family branches, and countries over the years. In times when literacy was uncommon, names such as Carballo were written down based on their pronunciation, potentially leading to misspellings. Researching these misspellings and alternate spellings of the Carballo name are important in understanding its origins.

== History ==
Carballo dates back to 759 AD; the name is actually a Galician word meaning Oak, referring to the settlement's surroundings of forest on mountainous terrain. The Atlantic Ocean is a short distance to the west side of the town, to the north is the Bay of Biscay or Viscaya and to the east is the Mediterranean Sea, with a 1,130 km drive to La Marina de Port, Barcelona, Spain and 618 km drive east by south east to Madrid and 846 km drive south to Seville. It has a good geographical position that allows you to establish easy communication with the main cities of Galicia, Spain and enjoy the landscape diversity that make up its rivers. This is evident from the Anllóns River and through the natural area of Razo-Baldaio.

The Municipality of Carballo was created in 1836. In 1920, the Architect Julio Galan father of Julio Galán Gómez, built the Town Hall used until 1974. In the 1920s and 1930s Carballo was widely modernized, schools were built and spaces opened up. During the 1940s, the Exploitation of natural resources of Tungsten began a period of growth that reached its peak from 1960 to 1980, and during the last third of the twentieth century saw extensive urban expansion.

Carballo was also known since Antiquity for the medicinal properties of its sulfurous waters known as Vellos or Baths, which are still sold commercially today, as evidenced by the remains found in a spa town in the eighteenth century. Their medicinal properties are indicated for nonspecific respiratory diseases as well as the hormonal disorders Hypothyroidism and Hypogonadism.

Later, the Romans, during the Roman Empire (27BC to 476/1453AC), attracted by the fertility of the land, for the abundance of minerals and for its sulfurous waters, also left their mark. In this sense, the remains of the Villa Termal are the best preserved monument of this period throughout the town, along with the Lubiáns Bridge, high above the river Rosende, between the towns of Carballo and Coristanco.

== Culture ==
=== Historical and Artistic Heritage ===
Carballo has been inhabited since ancient times, which is evident from its historical and artistic heritage. Thus, the Megalithic era left its mark on the famous dolmen the "Pedra Moura", while the Castreña culture still substantial forts are preserved and the example of these are, the Castro of Cances (also known as Bico de Castro), Castro Torre Pardiñas (castro of reduced dimensions with a predominantly defensive role), the forts of Guntian and Cotomil (which still retain some of its defense walls), and Castro de Vilela and Nion (noted for its complex structure).

In Brañas do Carregal (parish Aldemunde) are the remains of the dolmen of Pedra Moura, belonging to the megalithic culture. There are also numerous Cultura Castreña or Castro Culture remains of those who, despite their irregular conservation, we can deduce the high occupation of the territory of this area during the Celtic culture and part of the Middle Ages. Studies indicate that the name of the region, Bergantiños, could have originated from the Celtic tribe of the Brigantinos.

From Roman times there are very few Archaeological remains. Highlights include the fort of Torre Pardiñas in Razo, where the Roman influence is felt in their defensive scheme, and especially the Roman Bridge of Lubiáns, which was part of the Roman road per Loca Maritima. The remains are still supposed to date from the Middle Ages or the 18th century.

=== Religious Architecture ===
With regard to Sacred architecture, the most important building is the Church of Rus, which was built between the seventeenth and eighteenth centuries, belongs to the Baroque style, but has in its facade with characteristic features of Neoclassicism. Inside, projecting the image of the Asunción, attributed to Rodeiro, and the imposing parish silver cross a meter high.

Interesting are also the churches of Entrecruces, eighteenth-century Baroque, and Sofán, eighteenth- and nineteenth-century facade, where a Christ by Ferreiro is preserved. The church of Oza, meanwhile, presents a St. Breixo facade carved in stone, while inside the temple this same crown Baroque altarpiece figure the best preserved in the whole environment.

Since the twentieth century churches dating with Baroque altarpieces or Razo, which preserves images of St. John the Baptist and St. Martin of Braga made by the school in Santiago de Compostela. From the same period is the church of Bertoia, which can be seen a Gothic Christ and a processional cross from the eighteenth century.

On the other hand, the municipality of Carballo today presents numerous remains of popular architecture like the "stone crosses" of Sofán, Ardana, Carballo or the Rus; or "breastplates of souls" (brush) that can be visited in A Brea, Cances on-site or in the parish of Oza. Interesting too are also the Granaries (Brea, Serantes do Medio or Rodo) and Mills (protrude A Cheda, Fifth and Ponte Rosende).

A parish with strong personality is to Rebordelos, belonging to the jurisdiction of Caión throughout the Middle Ages and of modern and independent constitutive council until 1836. There is a mámoa on the road leading to the beach of Pedra do Sal, a Celtic castro Costenla in place, several mansions in Vilar de Peres and the chapel of San Juan with its cruise in Leira. In iglesario of Rebordelos it is known about the presence of the Count of Grajal and the Convent of San Agustin and the family of Rodriguez-Arijón. The church of San Salvador is located in the town center, with a street that surrounds it. The cruise about 150 meters. Rebordelos parish is bordered by the Atlantic Ocean: Baldaio marshes, Pedra do Sal, beaches A Lapeira, Arnela and Leira, Puerto Loureiro and Pedra Furada, witnessed countless shipwrecks.

Several palaces that are still preserved in the village of Carballo are example of these are the Palace of Pallas, the Gontade Palace, and the Palace of Vilardefrancos, Pazo do Souto. While the civil architecture, highlights the nineteenth century building that housed the jail and is now converted into the Museum of Bergantinos.

== Population ==
The municipality has 31,466 registered inhabitants. It has a density of 167.39 inhabitants per square kilometer.

From:INE Archiv

== Notable people ==
- Xurxo Borrazás (born in 1963) - Galician writer and translator.
- Rober Bodegas (born in 1982) - Comedian known for participating in La 1.

== International relations ==
=== Twin towns – sister cities ===
Carballo is twinned with:

- L'Isle-Jourdain, France

== Gallery ==
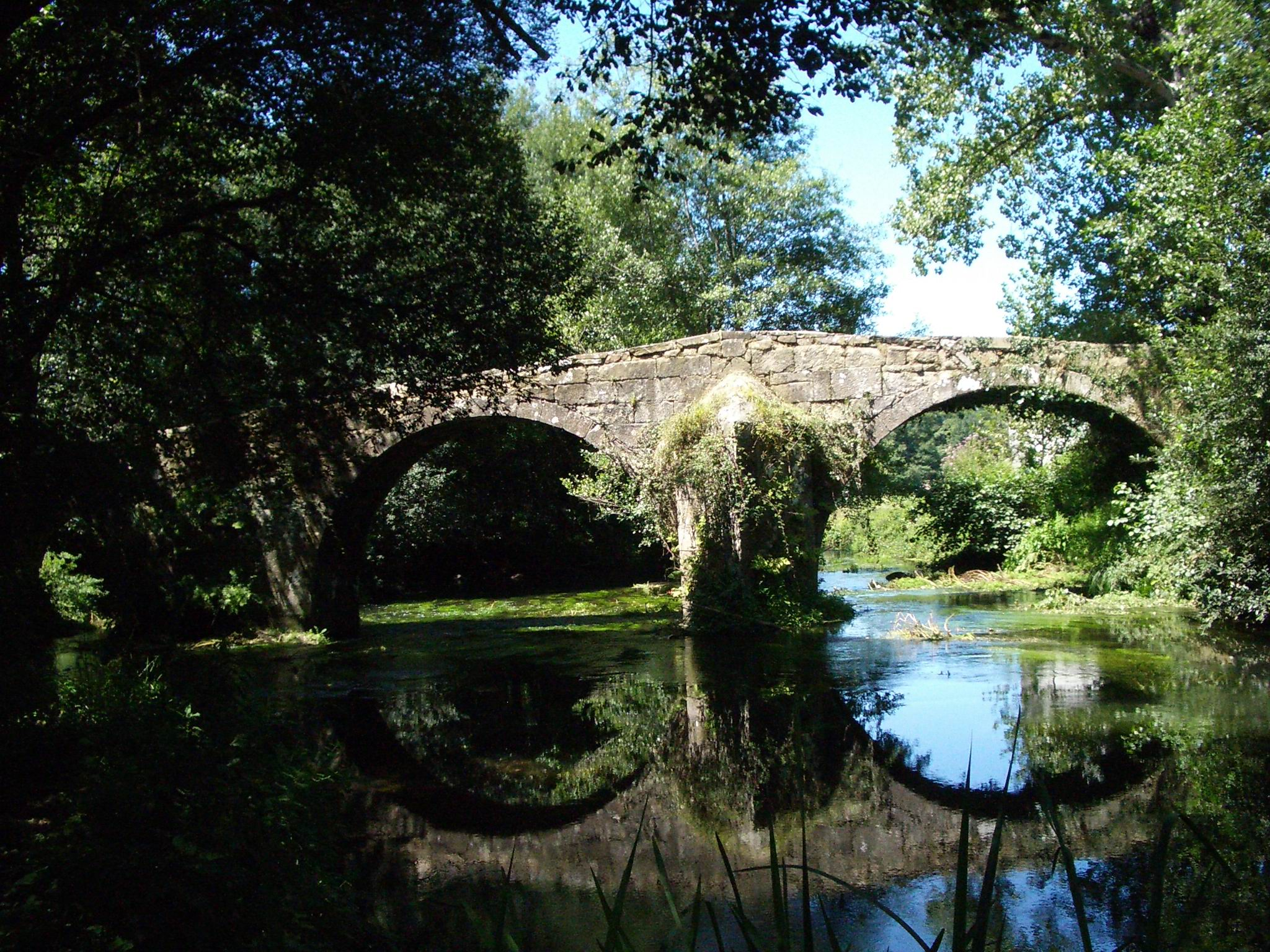
Roman bridge of Lubians

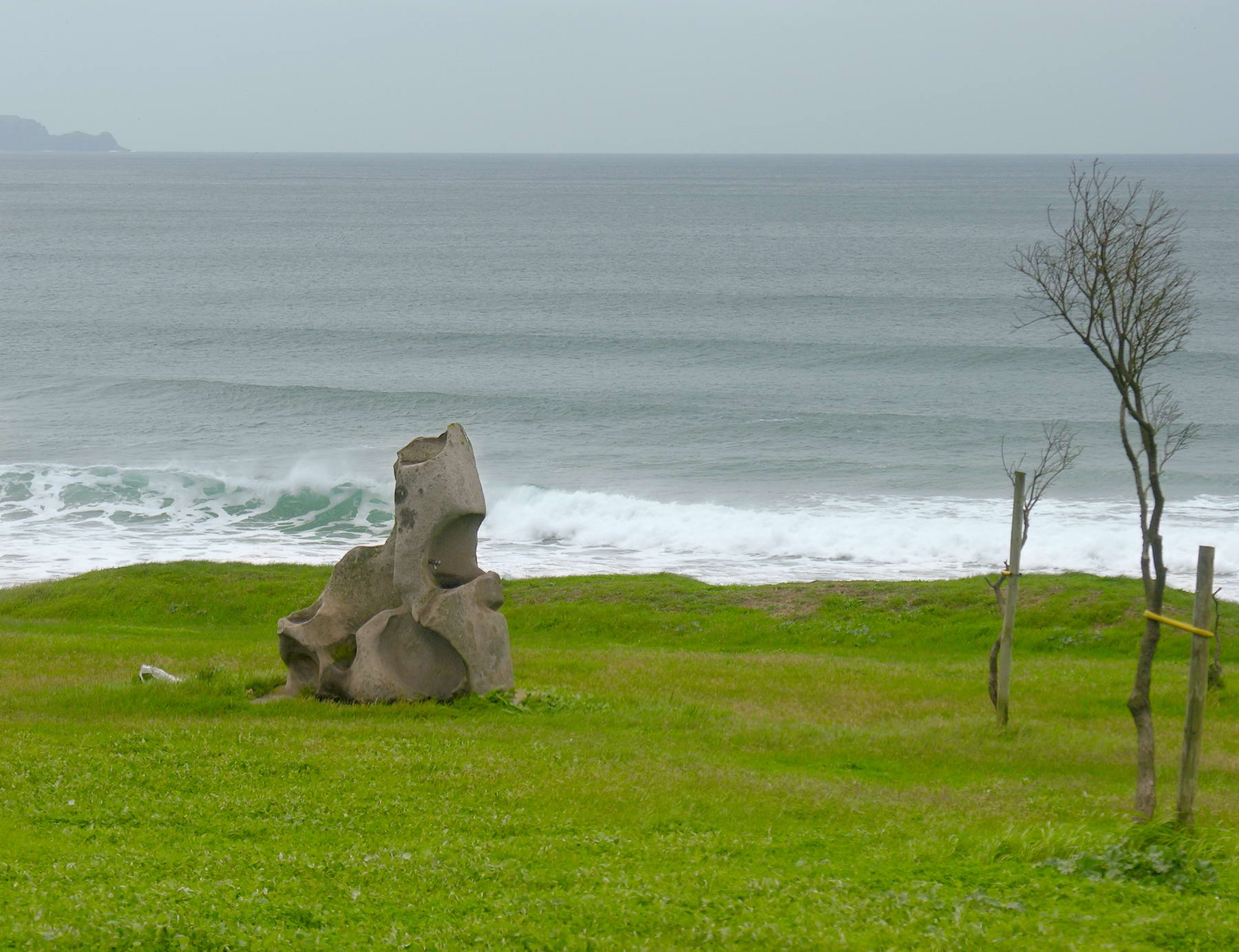
Razo beach

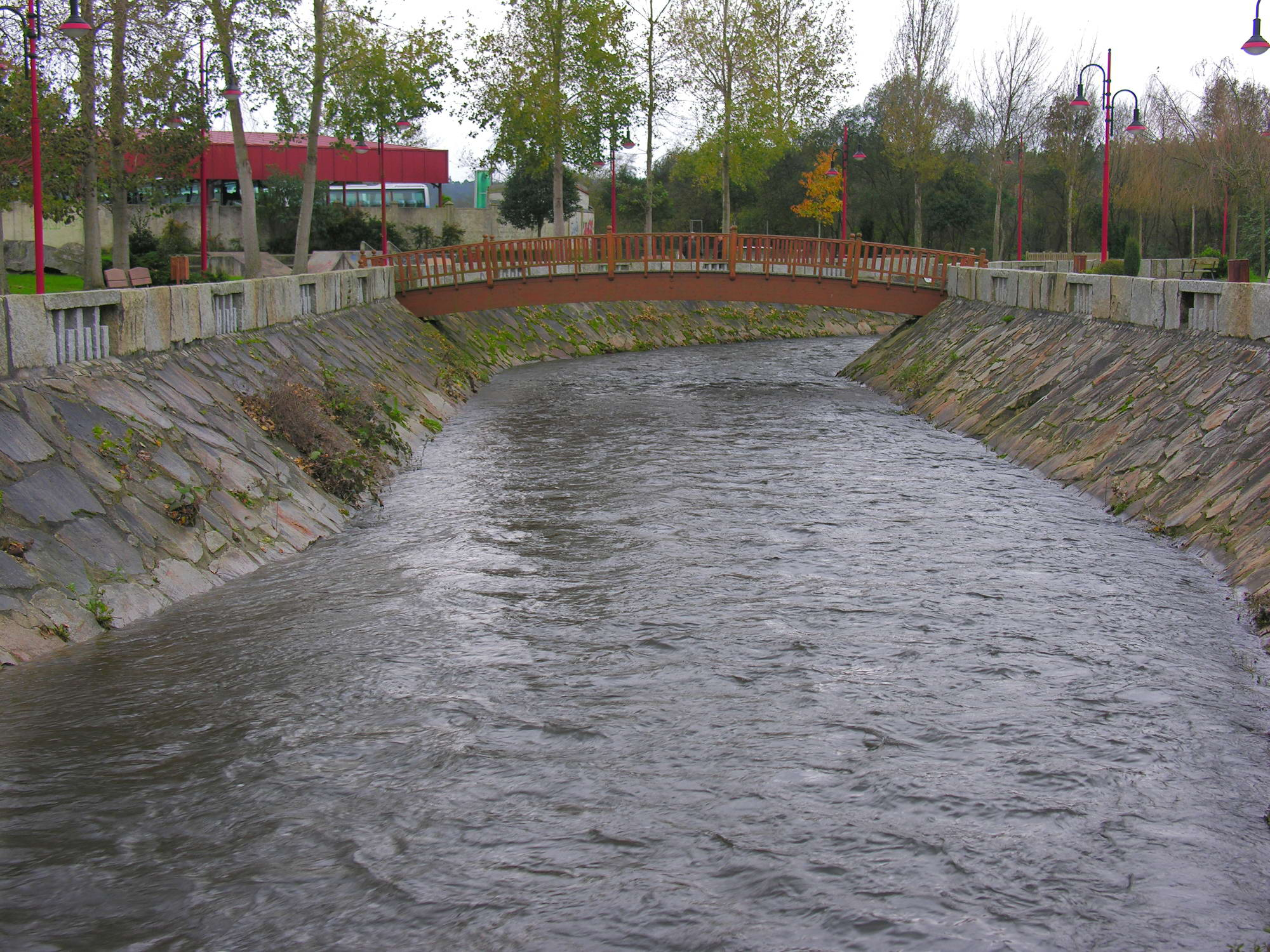
Anllóns River

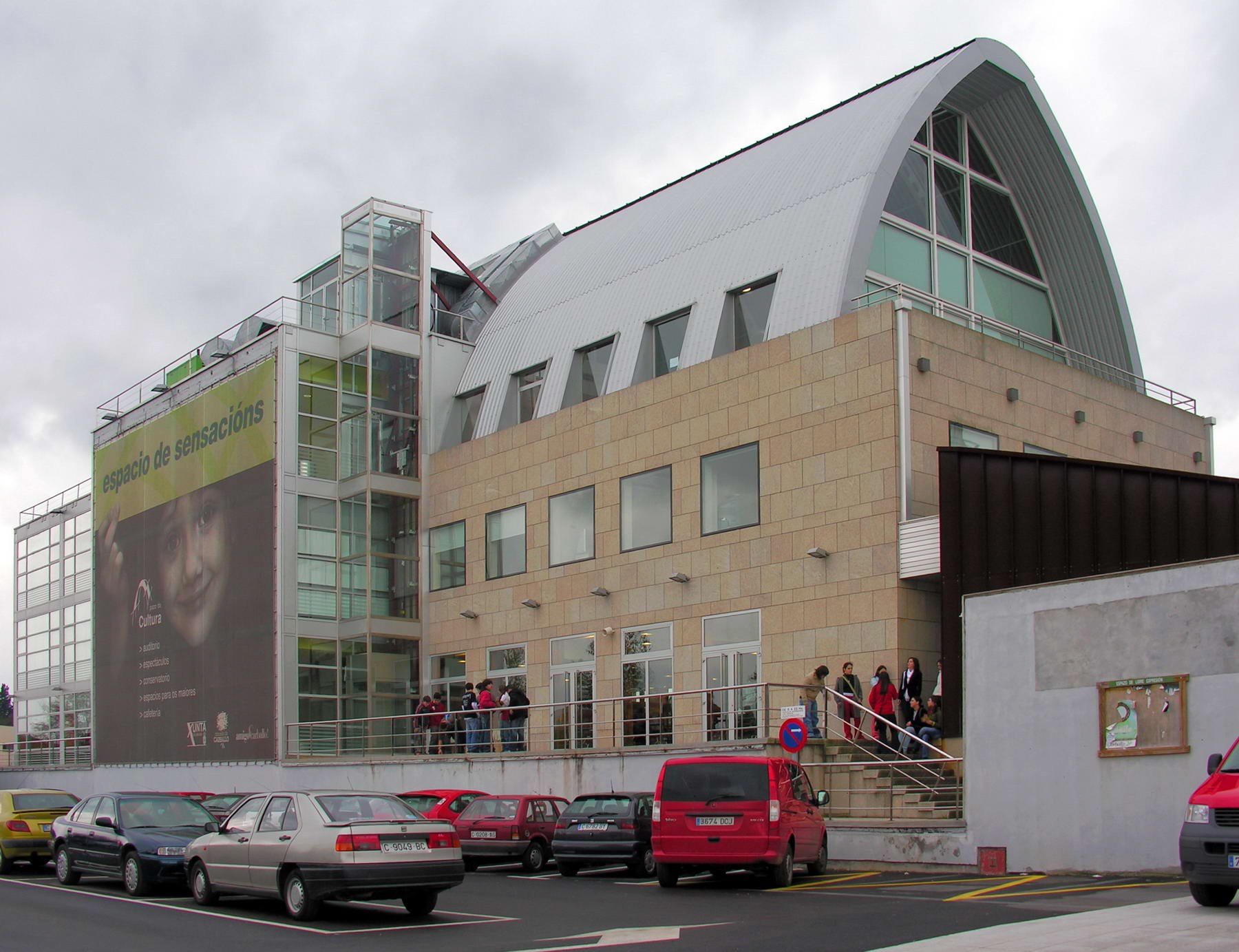
The Place of Culture (Pazo da Cultura)

== See also ==
List of municipalities in A Coruña
