= Buno =

Buno may refer to:

== People ==
- Conrad Buno (1613–1671), German copperplate engraver, cartographer and publisher
- Buno Ramnath (fl. 18th century), Hindu philosopher

== Places ==
- Buno-Bonnevaux, France
- Buño, Spain

== Other ==
- Buno (era), in Japan
- Buno (wrestling)
- BuNo, a US military aircraft numbering system
- Buno people
