= Malpica de Tajo =

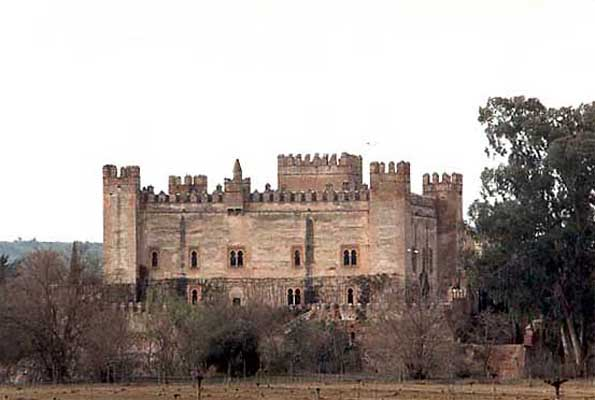
- Malpica Castle (14th century).

- Coat of arms

- Location in Spain.
- Coordinates: 39°54′0″N 4°32′58″W
- Country: Spain
- Autonomous community: Castile-La Mancha
- Province: Toledo
- Comarca: Torrijos

Government
  - Mayor: José Gómez Mata

Area
  - Total: 80 km^{2} (31 sq mi)
- Elevation: 398 m (1,306 ft)

Population (2025-01-01)
  - Total: 1,655
  - Density: 21/km^{2} (54/sq mi)
- Time zone: UTC+1 (CET)
  - Summer (DST): UTC+2 (CEST)
- Website: Official website

Malpica de Tajo is a municipality located in the province of Toledo, Castile-La Mancha, Spain.

== International relations ==
=== Twin towns – sister cities ===
Malpica de Tajo is twinned with:

- Malpica de Bergantiños, Galicia, Spain
