= Ponteceso =

- Municipality
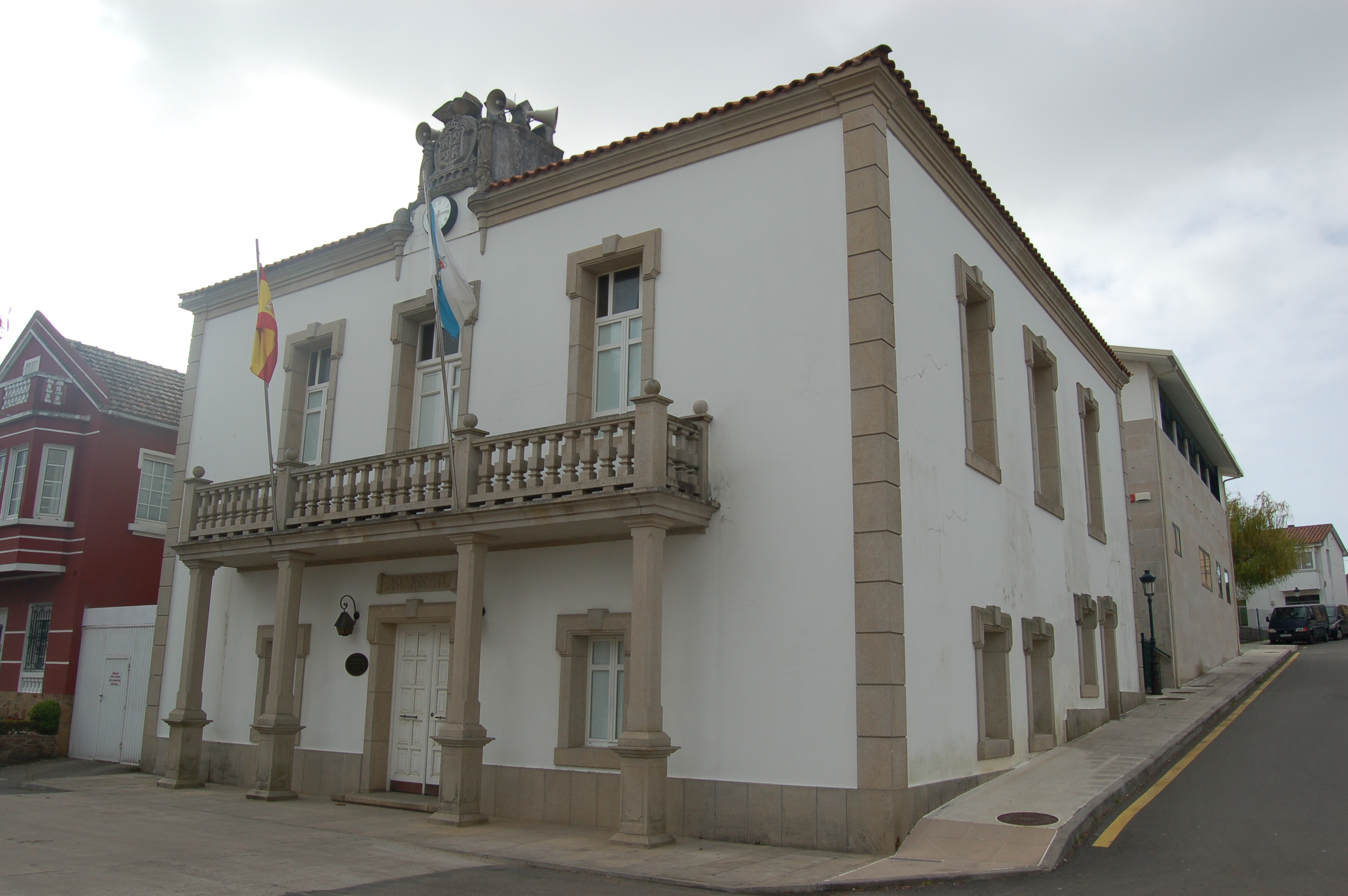

- Coat of arms

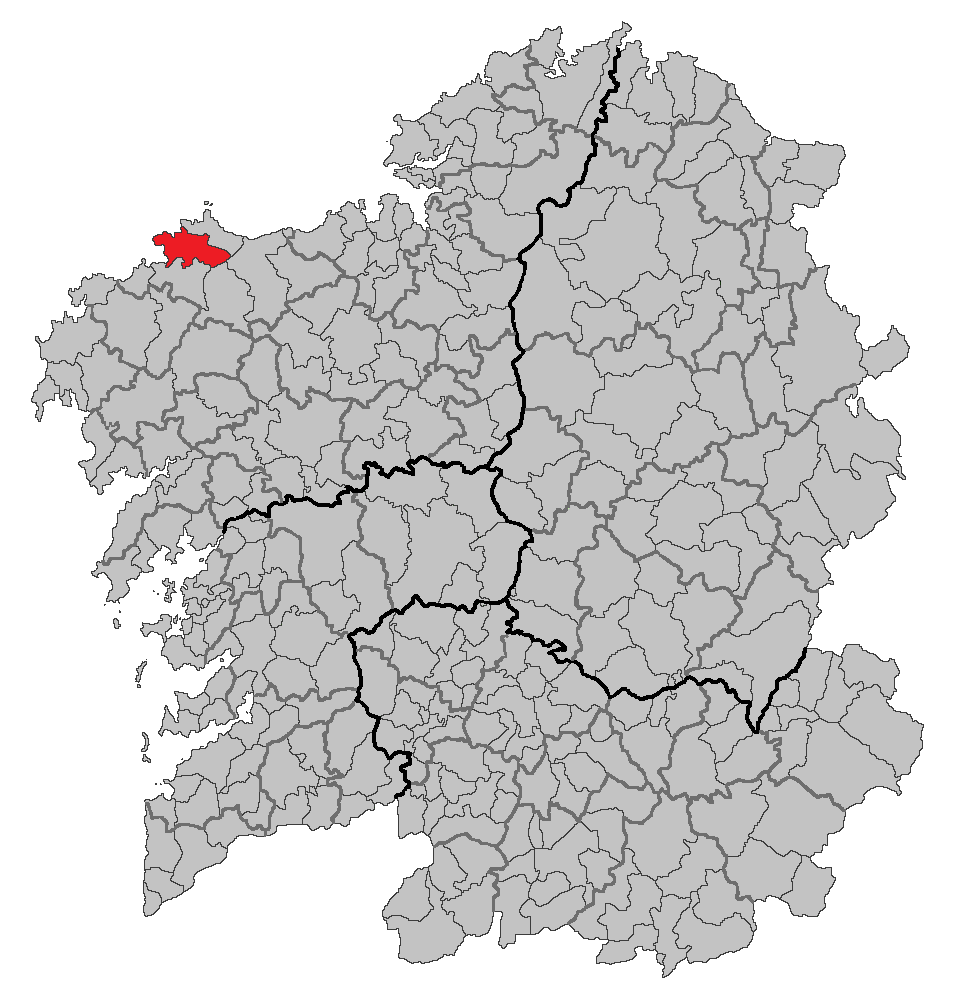
- Location of Ponteceso within Galicia
- Coordinates: 43.2667°N 8.8833°W
- Country: Spain
- Autonomous community: Galicia
- Province: A Coruña
- Comarca: Bergantiños
- Parroquias: Anllóns, Brantuas, Cores, Corme Aldea, Corme Porto, Cospindo, Graña, Langueirón, Nemeño, Niñóns, Pazos, Tallo, Tella and Xornes

Area
  - Total: 92.01 km^{2} (35.53 sq mi)

Population (2025-01-01)
  - Total: 5,268
  - Density: 57.25/km^{2} (148.3/sq mi)
- Time zone: UTC+1 (CET)
  - Summer (DST): UTC+2 (CEST)

Ponteceso is a municipality in the province of A Coruña, in the autonomous community of Galicia, northwestern Spain. It belongs to the comarca of Bergantiños.

== Etymology ==
The name of the place comes from Latin PONTE CAESA, translating to "closed bridge".

== Demographics ==
From:INE Archiv

== See also ==
List of municipalities in A Coruña
