= A Laracha =

- Municipality
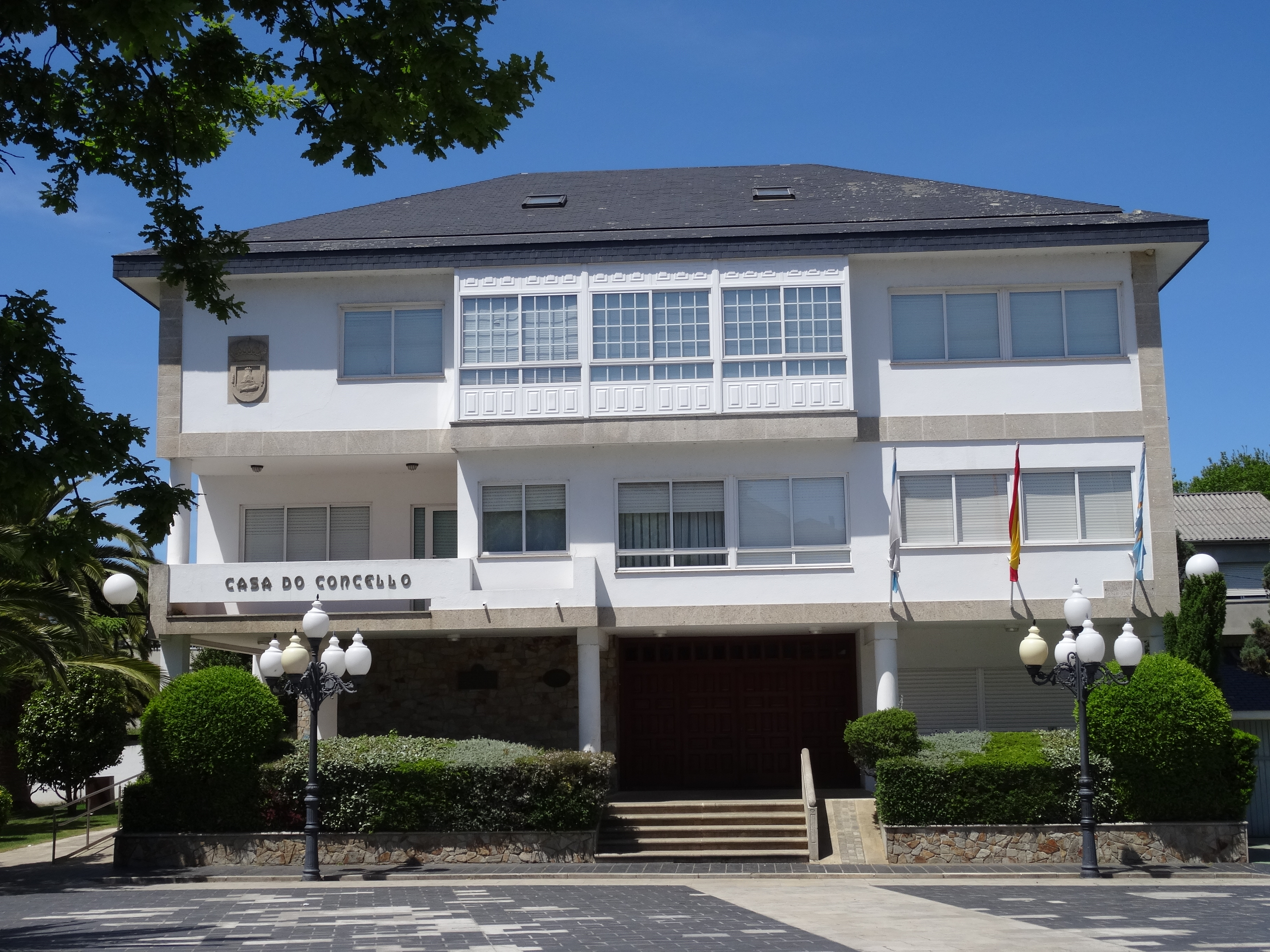

- Flag Coat of arms

- Location in Spain A Laracha (Spain) A Laracha (Europe)
- Coordinates: 43°14′55″N 8°35′0″W
- Country: Spain
- Autonomous community: Galicia
- Province: A Coruña
- Comarca: Bergantiños
- Judicial district: Carballo

Government
  - Alcalde: José Manuel López Varela (2007) (PP)

Area
  - Total: 125.95 km^{2} (48.63 sq mi)

Population (2025-01-01)
  - Total: 11,781
  - Density: 93.537/km^{2} (242.26/sq mi)
- Demonyms: Larachés, -esa
- Time zone: UTC+1 (CET)
  - Summer (DST): UTC+2 (CEST)
- Postal code: 15145
- Website: Official website

A Laracha is a municipality of northwestern Spain in the province of A Coruña, in the autonomous community of Galicia. It belongs to the comarca of Bergantiños. It has a population of 11,337 inhabitants (INE, 2011).

== See also ==
List of municipalities in A Coruña
