= Buño =

Parroquia in Galicia, Spain

Coordinates: 43°16′N 8°46′W

Santo Estevo de Buño (or simply Buño) is a parroquia in the municipality of Malpica de Bergantiños, in the autonomous community of Galicia, northwestern Spain. It belongs to the comarca of Bergantiños.

The town is known for its pottery.
