= Bergantiños =

Coordinates: 43°11′N 8°42′W

- Comarca
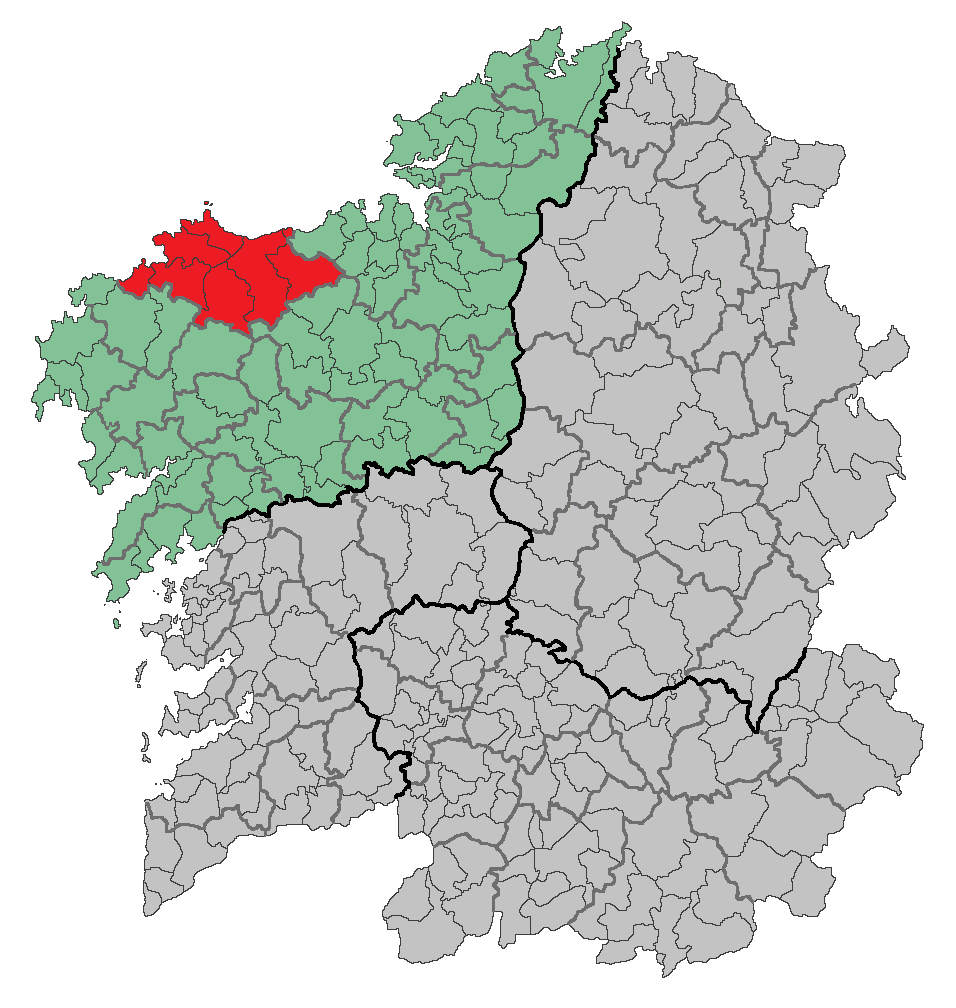
- Country: Spain
- Autonomous community: Galicia
- Province: A Coruña
- Capital: Carballo
- Municipalities: List: Cabana de Bergantiños, Carballo, Coristanco, A Laracha, Laxe, Malpica de Bergantiños, Ponteceso

Area
  - Total: 741.9 km^{2} (286.4 sq mi)

Population
  - Total: 66,840
  - Density: 90.09/km^{2} (233.3/sq mi)
- Demonym(s): bergantiñán, -á (academia.gal)
- Time zone: UTC+1 (CET)
  - Summer (DST): UTC+2 (CEST)

Bergantiños is a comarca in the Galician province of A Coruña. The comarca is made up by the municipalities of Cabana de Bergantiños, Coristanco, A Laracha, Laxe, Malpica de Bergantiños, Ponteceso and its capital, Carballo.

As of 2020, the overall population of this local region is 66,518.

== Populated places ==
- Buño
- Cabana de Bergantiños
- Carballo
- Coristanco
- A Laracha
- Laxe
- Malpica de Bergantiños
- Ponteceso
