= Church of Santa María a Real do Sar =

- Igrexa de Santa María a Real do Sar (Galician)
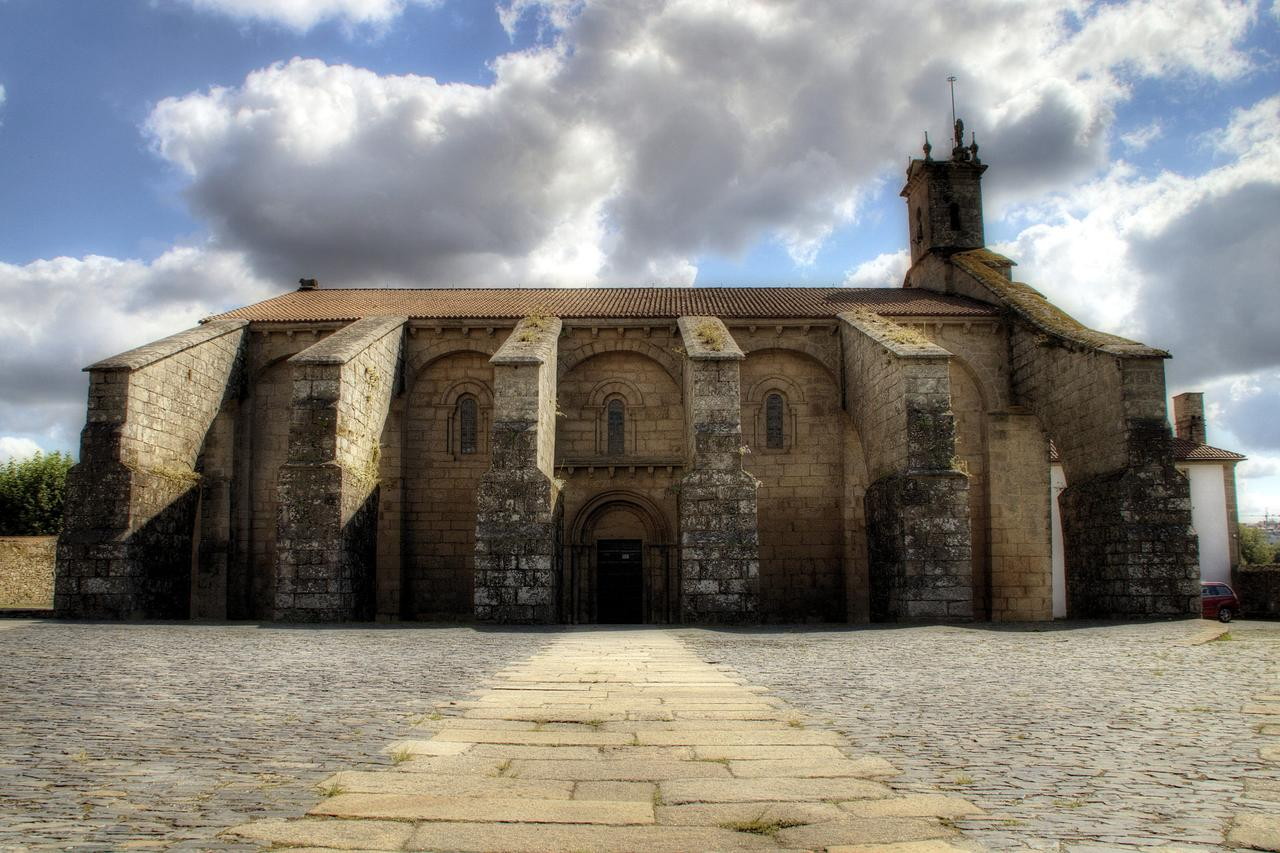

- Location within Spain
- 42.872439°N 8.536989°W
- Location: Santiago de Compostela, Spain

History
- Built: 12th Century

Site notes
- Area: Galicia
- Architectural style: Roman

Spanish Cultural Heritage
- Official name: Igrexa de Santa María a Real do Sar
- Type: Non-movable
- Criteria: Monument
- Designated: 1895
- Reference no.: RI-51-0000071

The Church of Santa María a Real do Sar (Galician: Igrexa de Santa María a Real do Sar) is a church located in Santiago de Compostela, Spain. It was declared Bien de Interés Cultural in 1895 and part of the UNESCO Heritage Site "Routes of Santiago de Compostela" since 1993.

It is one of the best examples of Romanesque architecture in the city, along with the cathedral. Construction began in the middle of the 12th century and was likely completed in the early 13th century. The workshop that completed the church and the cloister shows a clear influence of Master Mateo.

It is also notable for its leaning walls, due to its construction on marshy ground on the banks of the Sar river, which flows past Santiago. In the 18th century, to prevent the building from collapsing, a pair of buttresses were erected on either side, which went on to become one of the most striking features of the structure.

== See also ==
- List of Bien de Interés Cultural in the Province of A Coruña
