= Santi Pietro e Paolo d'Agrò =

Church in Casalvecchio Siculo, Sicily

Coordinates: 37°56′49.44″N 15°18′30.09″E

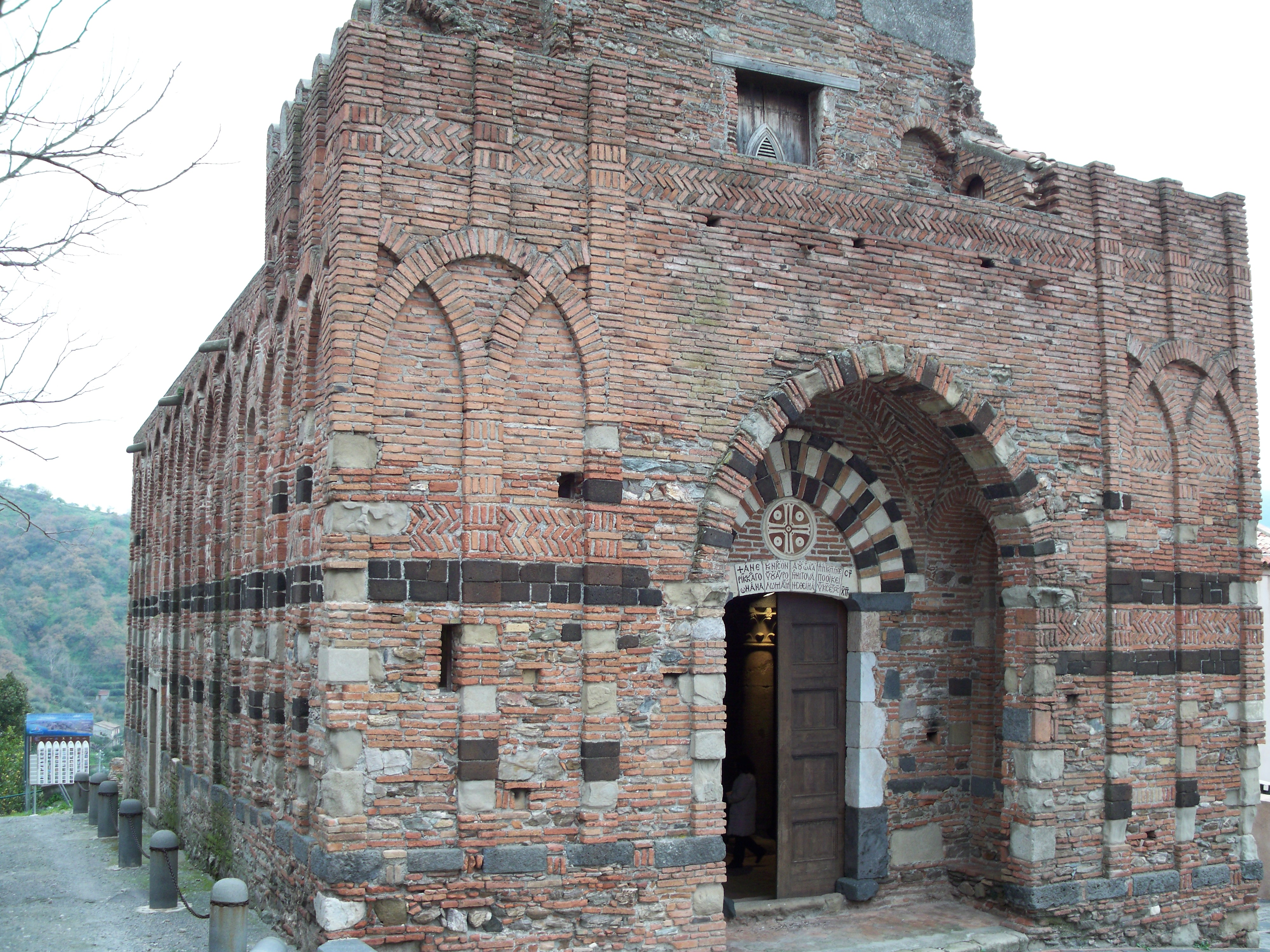
Santi Pietro e Paolo d’Agrò

Santi Pietro e Paolo d’Agrò is a church in Casalvecchio Siculo, in the Metropolitan City of Messina on Sicily (Italy). It is one of the foremost examples on Sicily of Norman architecture.

== History ==
The church was constructed during the 12th century as part of a Basilian monastery.

== Architecture ==
The church is about 11 metres (36 ft) wide, 20 metres (66 ft) long and 17 metres (56 ft) high. Its exterior is characterised by its block-like form, but the facade is richly decorated. Inside, the church has the plan of a basilica with three aisles. Two domes rise from the central nave, one above its centre and one above the choir.

The architecture of the church displays influences from a vast variety of sources, and constitutes "a mixed architectural heritage, attributable to Sicily's heterogeneous population, comprised of Muslims, Byzantines, and Normans." The block-like form of the exterior is reminiscent of North European contemporary architecture while the floor plan of the church is similar to the way churches were built in the Byzantine architectural tradition. Its principle of construction at the same time is essentially that of Western European Gothic architecture. In its details and decorations, too, the church exhibits a wealth of influences (e.g. in the use of muqarnas vaulting). For these reasons, the church has been called "one of the most sophisticated and coherent works of architecture to emerge from the Norman rule of the island".

== Gallery ==
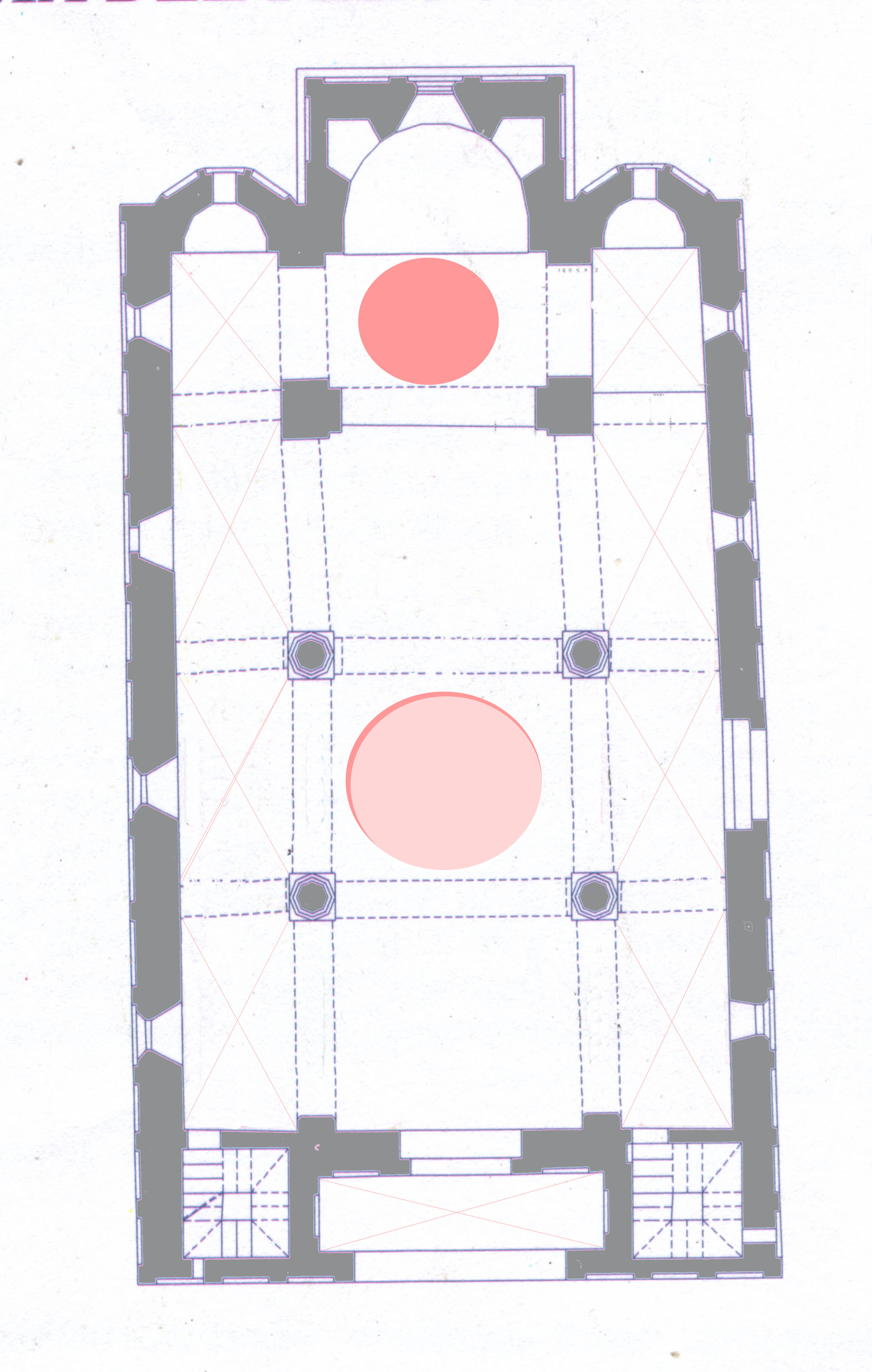
Floor plan

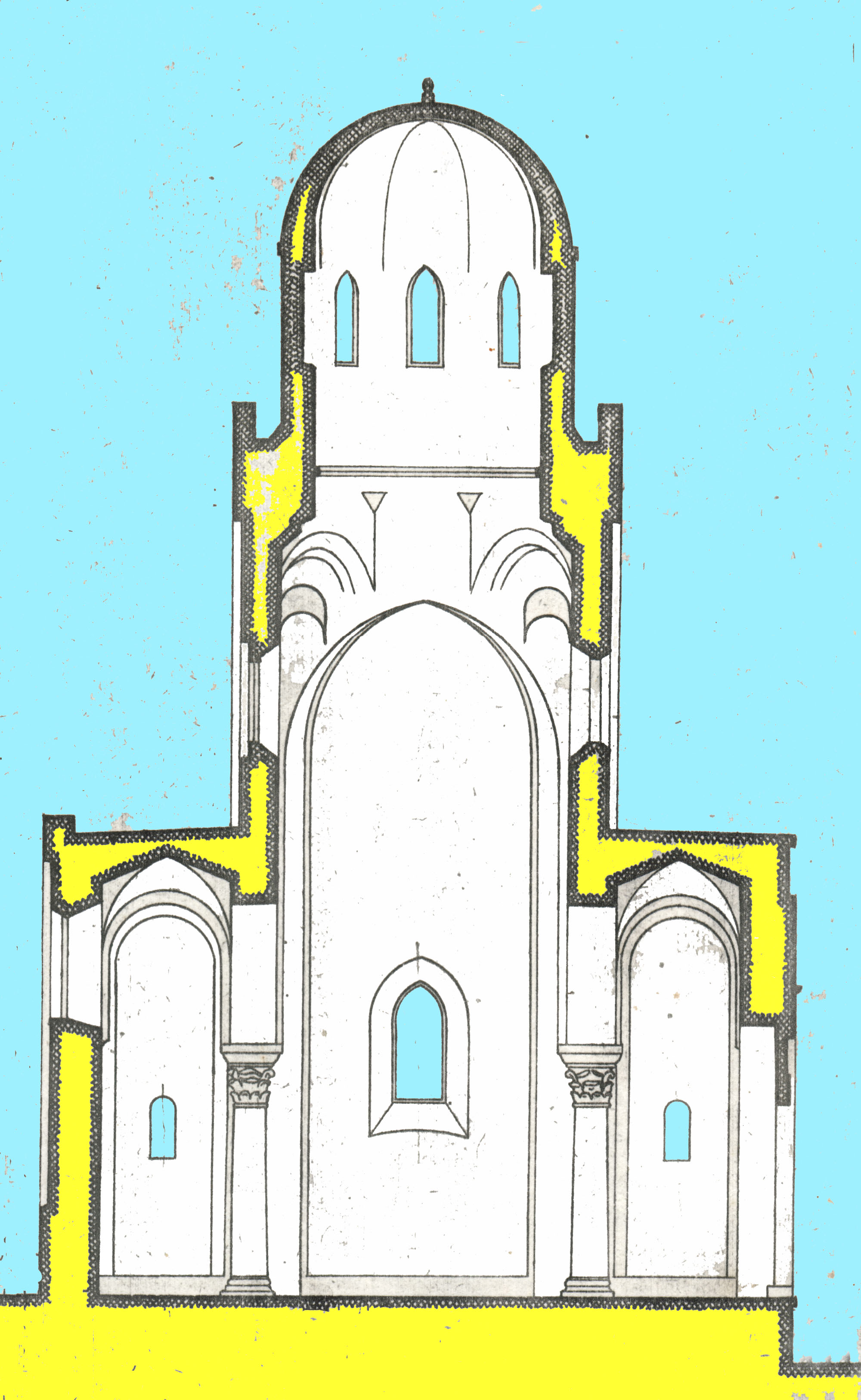
Section

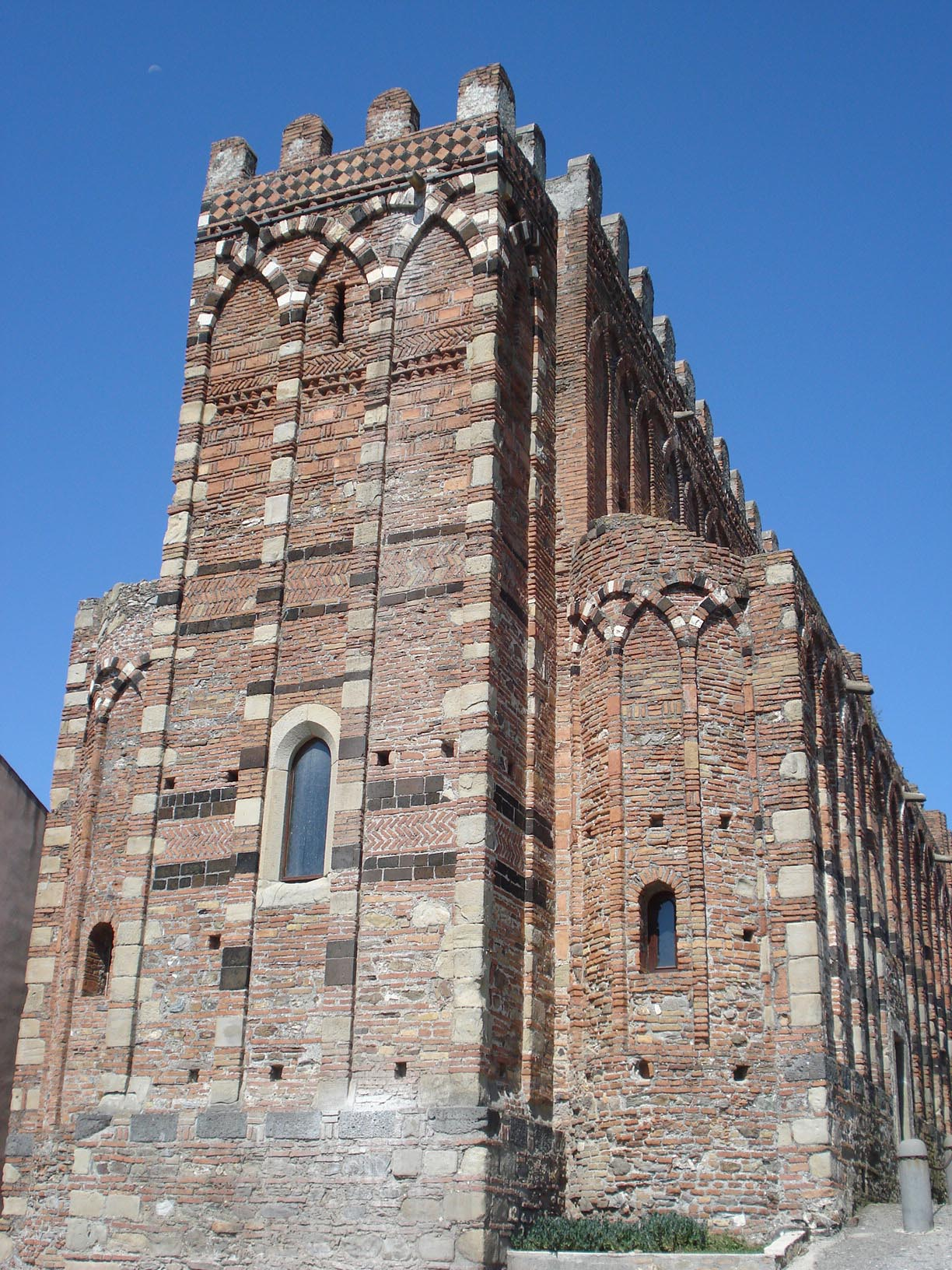
View of the apse

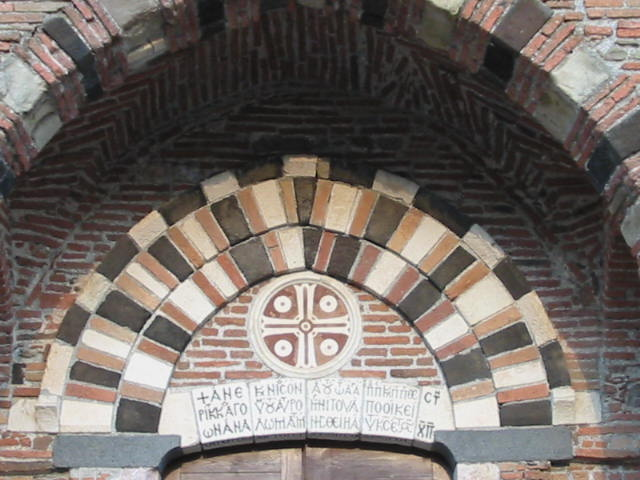
View of the plaque above the entrance

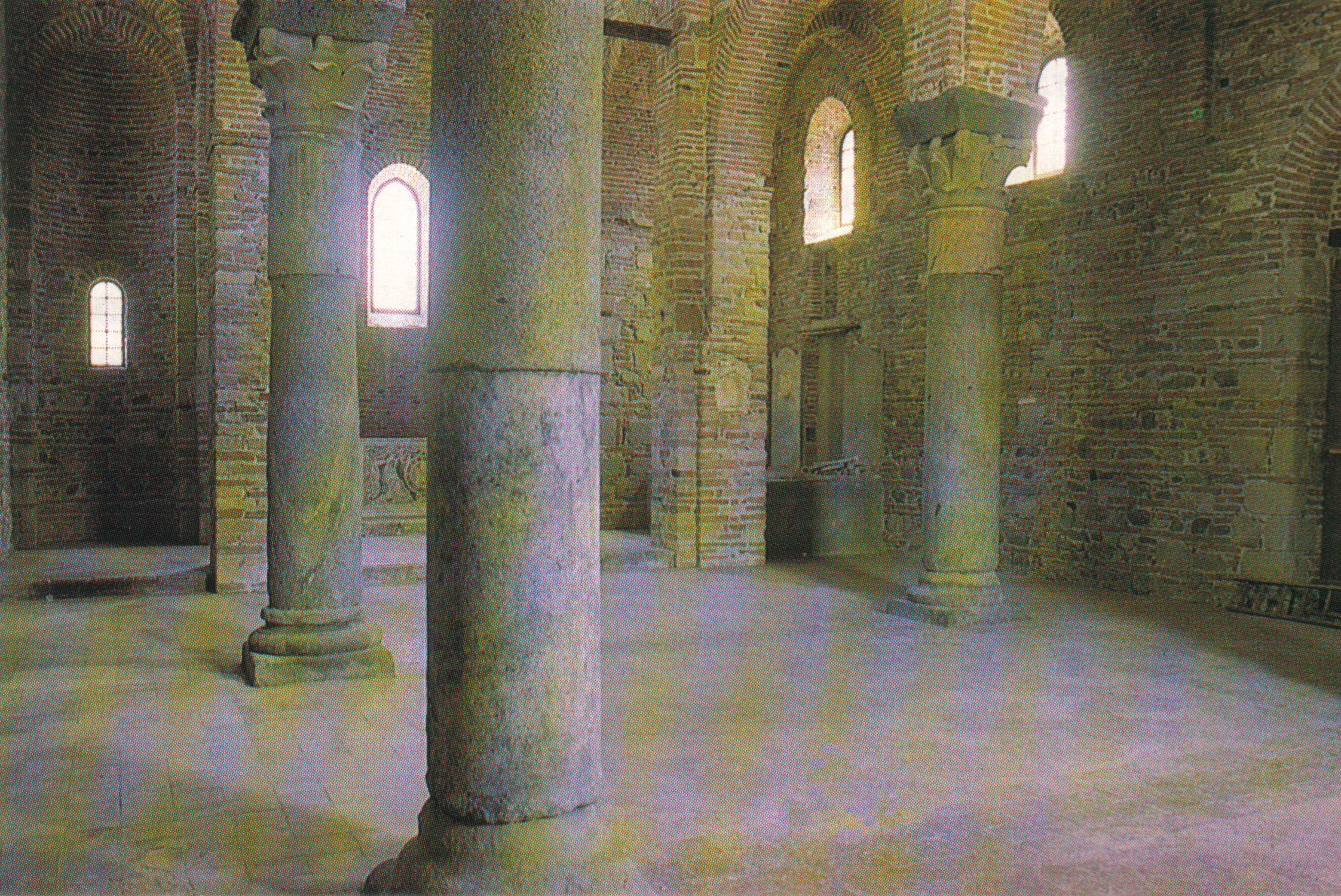
Interior

== See also ==
- Norman-Arab-Byzantine culture
- High medieval domes
