= Coristanco =

Municipality in Galicia, Spain

Coordinates: 43°12′N 8°45′W

- Municipality
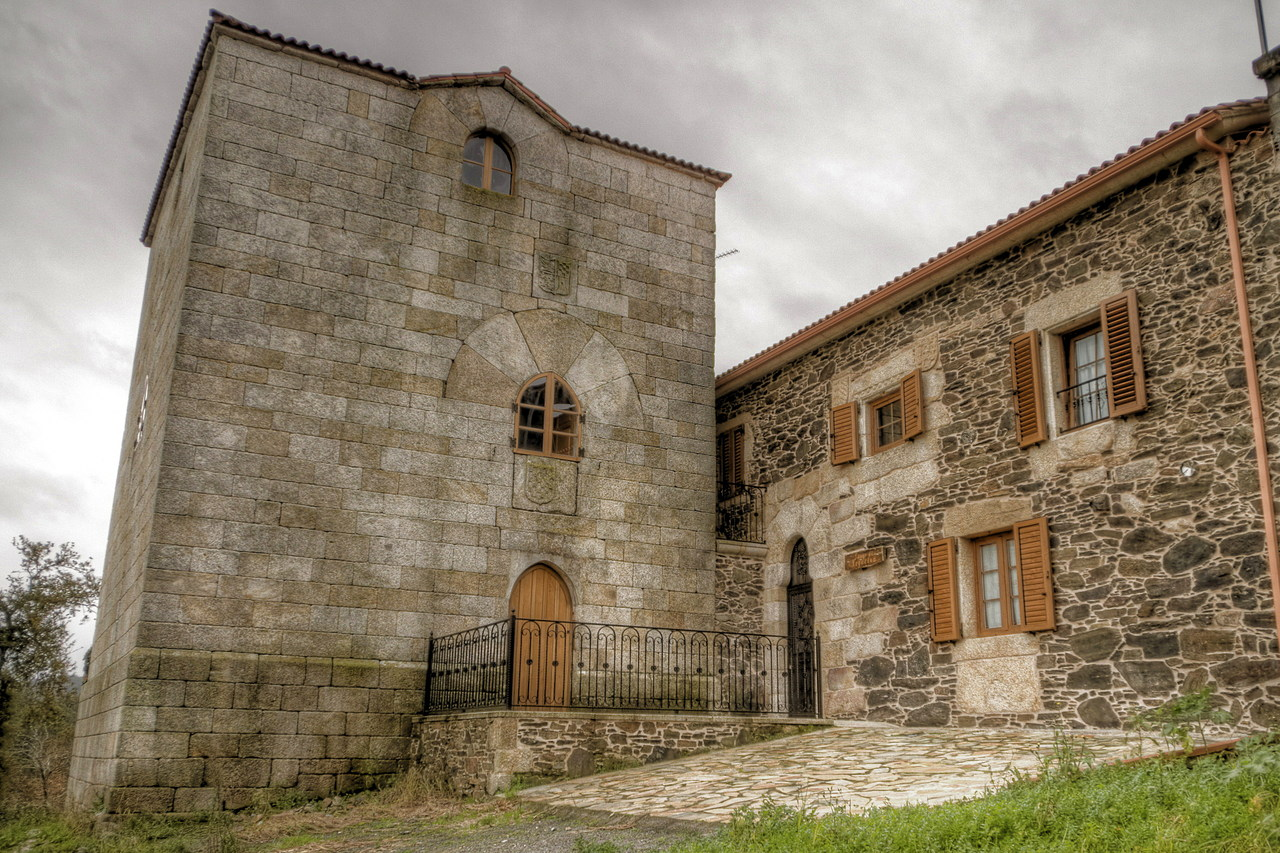

- Flag Coat of arms

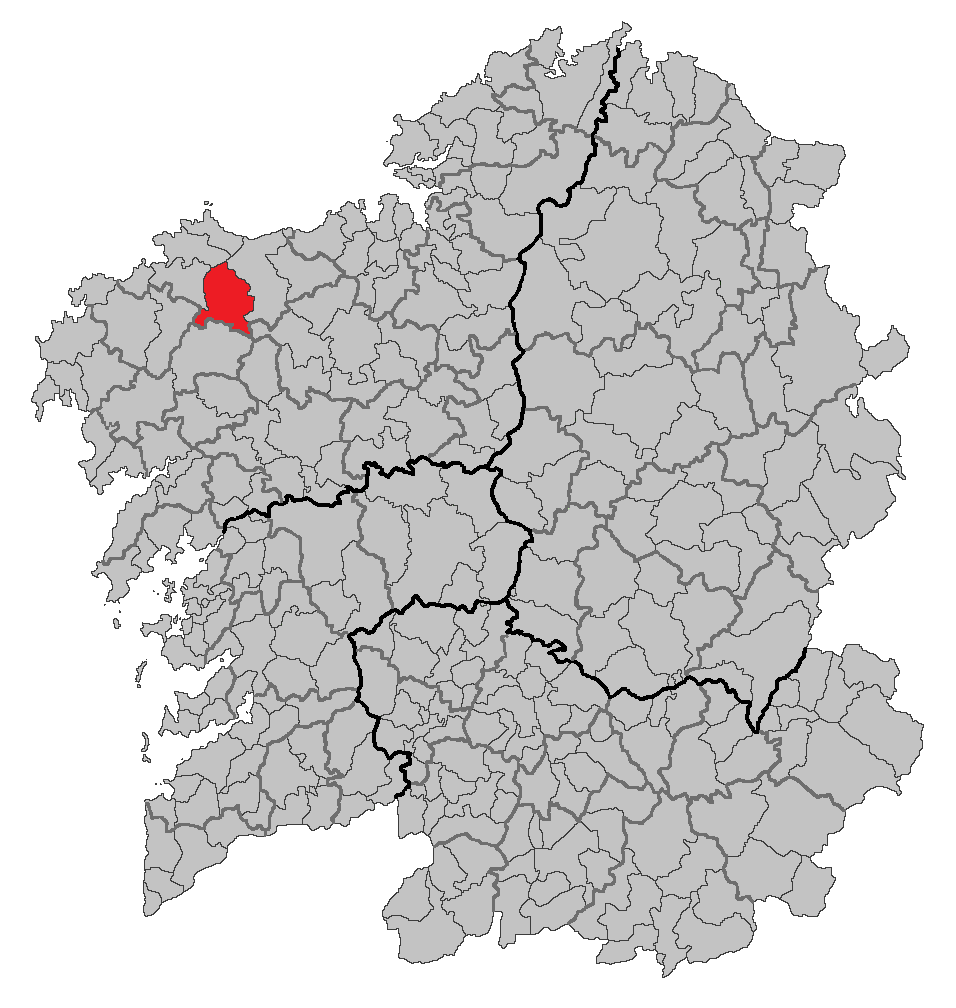
- Location of Coristanco within Galicia
- Country: Spain
- Autonomous community: Galicia
- Province: A Coruña
- Comarca: Bergantiños
- Parroquias: List: Agualada, Cereo, Coristanco, Couso, Cuns, Erbecedo, Ferreira, Oca, San Xián de San Xusto, Santa Baia de Castro, Seavia, Traba, Valenza, Verdes & Xaviña

Government
  - Alcalde (Mayor): Juan Carlos García Pose

Area
  - Total: 140 km^{2} (54 sq mi)

Population (2025-01-01)
  - Total: 5,710
  - Density: 41/km^{2} (110/sq mi)
- Time zone: UTC+1 (CET)
  - Summer (DST): UTC+2 (CEST)
- Website: http://www.coristanco.net/

Coristanco is a municipality in the province of A Coruña, in the autonomous community of Galicia, northwestern Spain. It belongs to the comarca of Bergantiños.

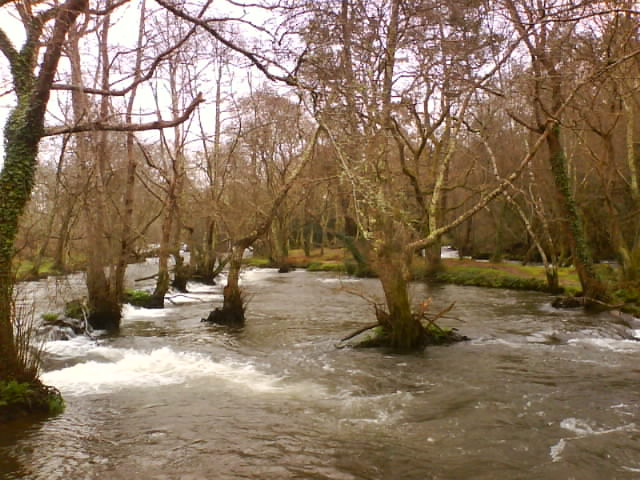
Anllóns river in Verdes, Coristanco

== Notable people ==
- Rubén Iván Martínez (born 22 June 1984), known simply as Rubén, is a Spanish professional footballer who played for CA Osasuna as a goalkeeper, and is now retired.
- José Ángel Esmorís Tasende (born 4 January 1997), known simply as Angeliño, is a Spanish professional footballer who currently plays for AS Roma in the left back and left midfielder positions.

== See also ==
List of municipalities in A Coruña
