= San Antolín de Toques =

Religious construction near Melide, Galicia

Coordinates: 42°58′41″N 7°58′59″W

Church of San Antolín de Torques
- Igrexa de San Antoniño de Torques
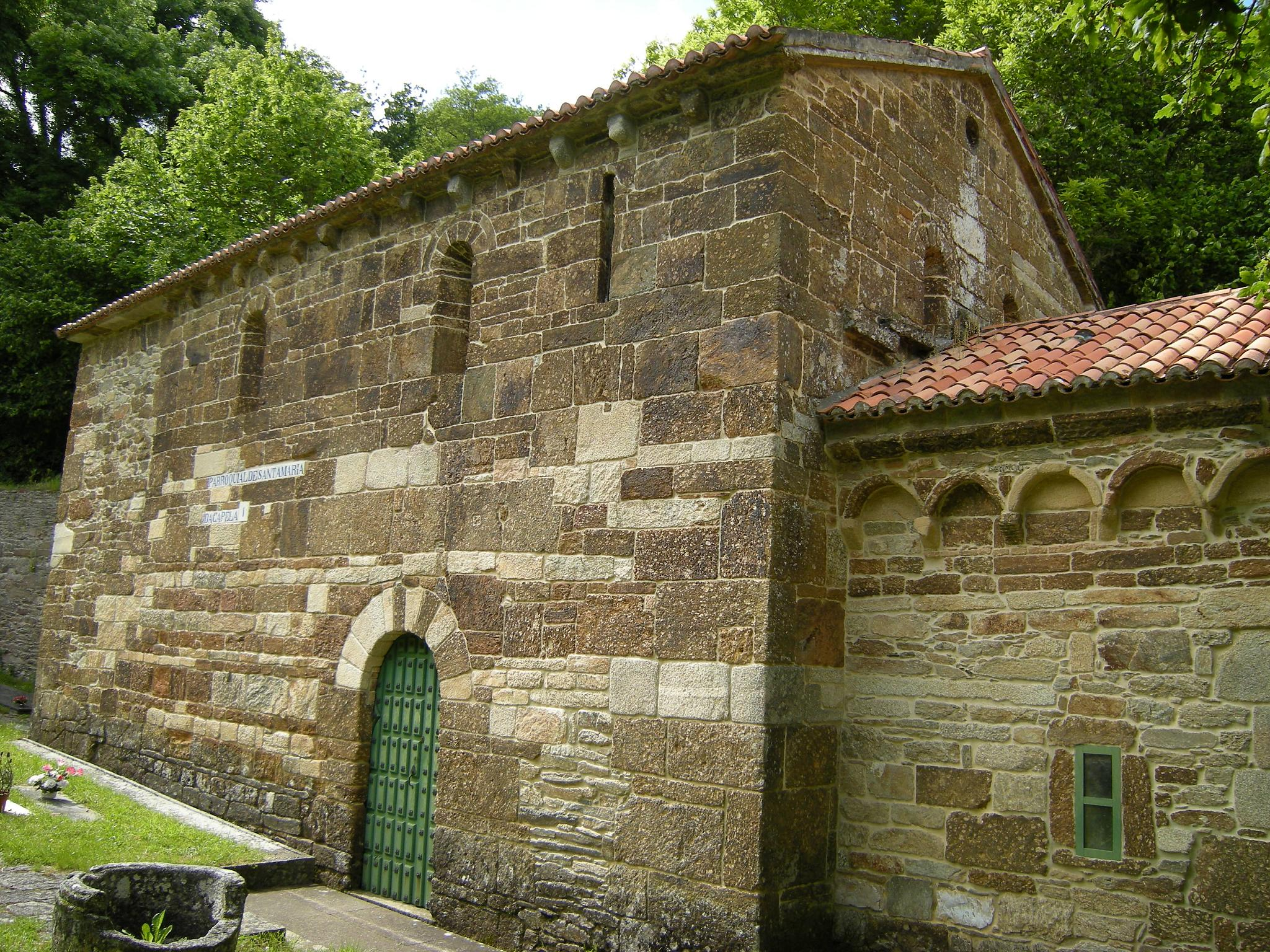
- The church in 2008
- Church of San Antolín de Torques
- Country: Spain
- Religious institute: Benedictines (previously), now Secular clergy

Architecture
- Heritage designation: Bien de Interés Cultural
- Architectural type: Pre-Romanesque, has Romanesque features

Administration
- Province: A Coruña
- Diocese: Roman Catholic Diocese of Lugo

The Church of San Antolín de Toques is a church in Toques, Galicia, Spain. Founded in the 10th century, it's one of the most complex buildings of the Middle Ages in Galicia, as it preserves elements and pieces from very different periods. It was declared a Bien de Interés Cultural in 1994.

== History ==
This monastery is considered by many scholars to be one of the oldest in Galicia. The first documentary reference corresponds to a donation of land that the King of Galicia, Don García, granted in April 1067 to the monastery, whose abbot was then Tanoy. This is the first evidence of Benediction in Galicia, in the land of Abeancos, in this monastery since in a first document from 1067, reference is made to Saint Benedict and the application of the Benedictine rule.

It maintained its independence until 1515, the year in which Pope Leo X annexed it to San Martiño Pinario by papal bull. From then until its exclaustration, it was a priory of this monastery in Santiago.

Little else is known of its history. After the confiscation, a nail and wire factory (promoted by French industrialists) was established in the monastery premises in 1843, using the power of the water from the stream that passed under the old monastery. The workers' houses, now in ruins, were built with the stones of the old monastery.

== Description ==
In the church, the Lombard Romanesque fascia can be distinguished, in contrast to the hegemonic Burgundian one and shared with the Basilica of San Martiño de Mondoñedo and the Church of San Xoán de Vilanova. Of the old church, a single-nave plan is preserved, topped with a rectangular pediment, with a gabled wooden roof in the nave and a barrel vault in the apse, a vault that can be dated to the Romanesque reform carried out in the 11th century.

=== Exterior ===
The oldest pieces are those used as the finishing touches to the presbytery's eaves and belong to Hispano-Visigothic art.

The small arches of the head, with simple geometric decorations, and the double-paned windows of the pediment and the nave are from the end of the 11th century, making it one of the first Galician Romanesque works preserved. However, in the eaves of the nave the style of the canzorros is more modern and common in Galician churches, with shapes that represent human heads, animals or plant and geometric motifs.

The western end of the nave is the result of an extension at the beginning of the 19th century. The side doors have semicircular arches that resemble previous horseshoe arches that have been renovated.

Other notable elements of the exterior of the church, in addition to the pseudo-isodomic device, typical of 10th century churches, are the window openings with semicircular arches in which slender embrasures open and the doors of the north and south walls with semicircular arches. The main or western facade is later than the rest of the factory.

The equipment used in the construction of the walls shows the mixture of styles and construction phases, there is ashlar, perpiaño and masonry.

=== Interior ===
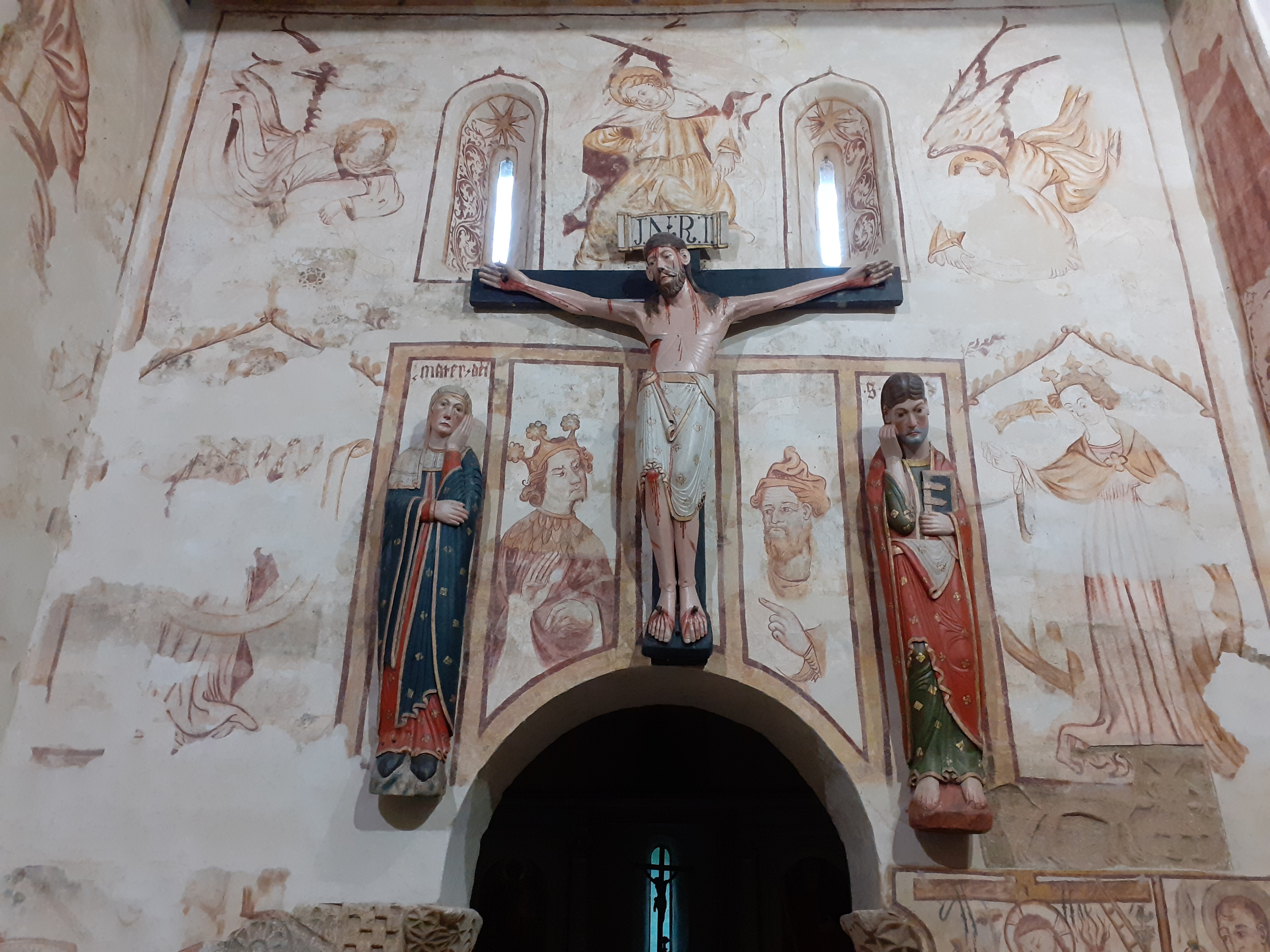
Wallpaints of the altar

The church is approximately rectangular in plan, with the north wall slightly deviated. Its single nave, with a wooden roof, extends into a narrower apse, more or less square in plan, covered with a barrel vault, which is accessed by a triumphal arch, also cantilevered. The latter comes from joined semi-columns where the capitals with Mozarabic motifs stand out. The rest of the frontispiece is covered with mural paintings that surround the round arch; the most primitive of these belongs to the first third of the 16th century in Renaissance style. The remaining paintings correspond to the 18th century, with a Saint George or Santiago, Saint Gregory and Saint Bartholomew. Other paintings that are less well preserved appear on the north and south walls.

Inside, a Gothic or transitional to Gothic Calvary is preserved, with the central figure of Christ and on either side the Virgin and Saint John, in polychrome wood, an original work by an artist supposedly of English origin belonging to the 12th or 13th century.

The triumphal arch is preserved from the pre-Romanesque construction, supported by columns with Visigothic bases and capitals (similar to those of the church of Santa Comba de Bande), one of them adorned with a triscele. There is no molding between the capital and the column, acquiring a great development and a truncated conical profile. The ornamentation completely covers both capitals with geometric motifs carved in beveled edges. Its study has allowed us to discern some forms used in Galician Visigothic works, such as a fleur-de-lis-shaped scheme that links it to the Saamasas workshop.

Also noteworthy is a relief from the 9th or 10th century with stylistic similarities to the Asturian style that represents a quadruped, with open jaws and a tail on its back; behind it, a character, in a short tunic, hits its hips. The carving technique and its placement are similar to those of the reliefs of San Xes de Francelos.
