= Church of Santiago de Mens =

Church in Malpica de Bergantiños, Spain

Coordinates: 43°17′52″N 8°52′05″W

- Igrexa de Santiago de Mens
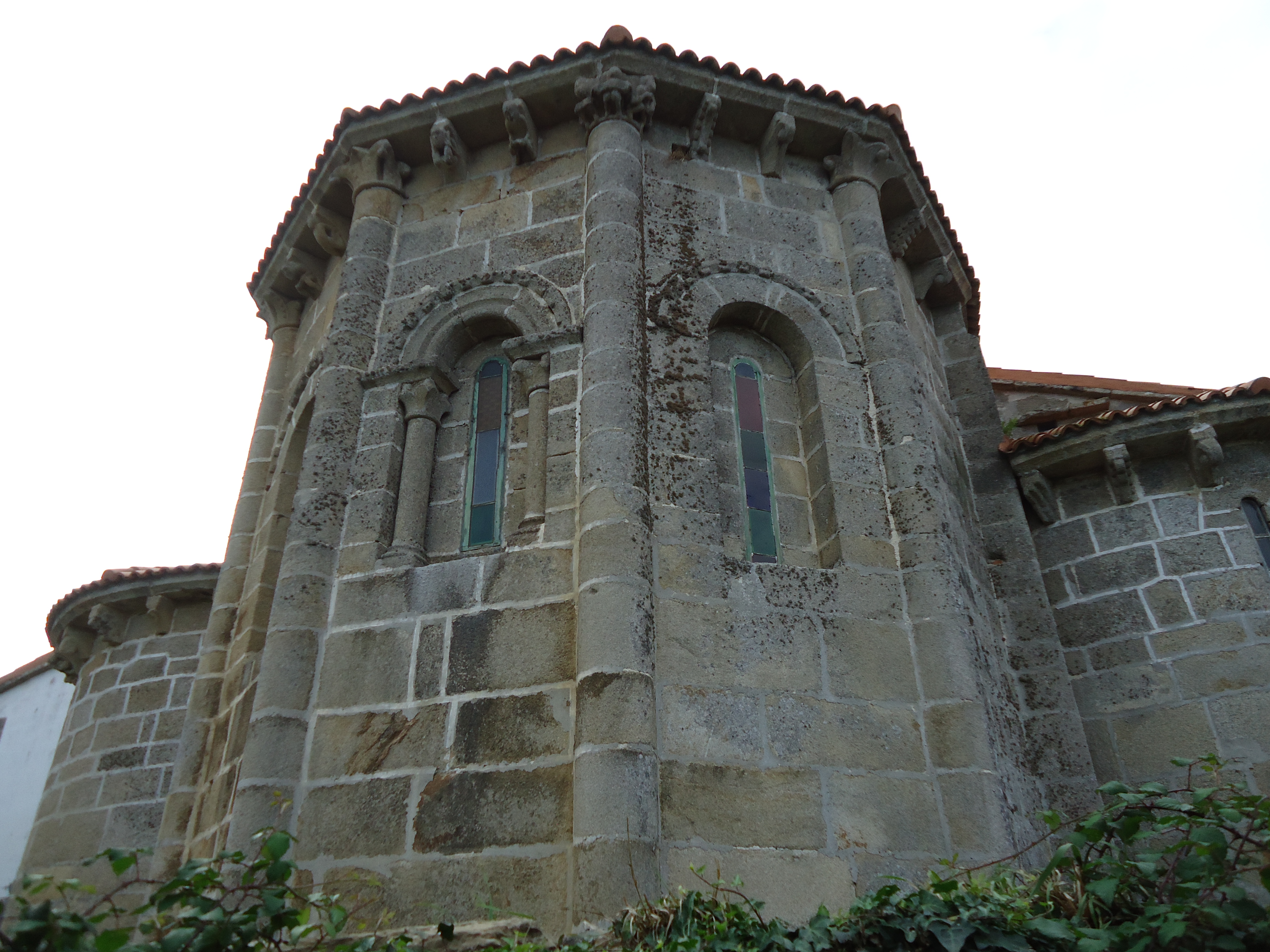

Religion
- Affiliation: Catholicism
- Province: A Coruña
- Region: Galicia

Location
- Municipality: Malpica de Bergantiños
- Country: Spain
- Interactive map of Church of Santiago de Mens

Architecture
- Style: Romanesque, Pre-Romanesque (old fundations)
- Groundbreaking: ~1200
- Completed: ~1200

Iglesia de Santiago de Mens is a Romanesque church in Malpica de Bergantiños, Province of A Coruña, Galicia, Spain. It was founded in the 12th century, and built in a Romanesque style over a Pre-Romanesque base. It was declared Bien de Interés Cultural in 1979.

== Design ==
The church is very compact by design and its structure was inspired in the old chapel erected in Santiago de Compostela following the discovery of the Apostle.
