= Malpica de Bergantiños =

- Municipality
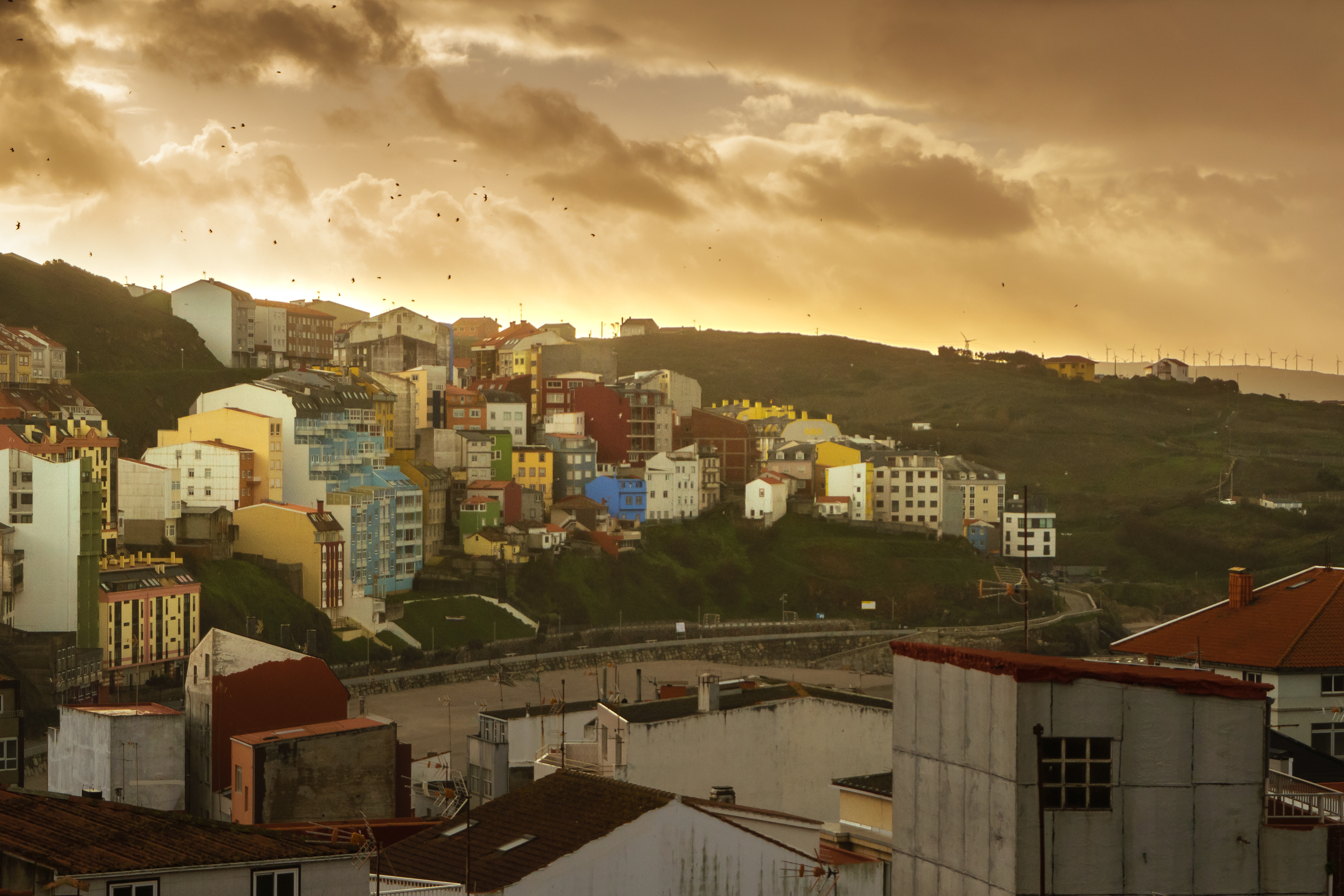
- Town view and Praia de Area Maior, Malpica.

- Flag Coat of arms

- Location in Spain.
- Coordinates: 43°19′N 8°48′W
- Country: Spain
- Autonomous Community: Galicia
- Province: A Coruña
- Comarca: Bergantiños

Government
  - Mayor: Eduardo Parga (PPdeG)

Area
  - Total: 61.22 km^{2} (23.64 sq mi)
- Elevation: 387 m (1,270 ft)

Population (2025-01-01)
  - Total: 5,232
  - Density: 85.46/km^{2} (221.3/sq mi)
- Time zone: UTC+1 (CET)
  - Summer (DST): UTC+2 (CEST)
- Website: Official website

Malpica de Bergantiños (or simply Malpica) is a municipality in the province of A Coruña, in the autonomous community of Galicia, northwestern Spain. It belongs to the comarca of Bergantiños, located 52 kilometres (32 mi) from the provincial capital of A Coruña.

== Culture ==
It is located on the route of the Way of the Lighthouses, which unites it with Fisterra. The church of Santiago de Mens stands in the town. As part of the Costa da Morte, the town of Malpica is best known for its marine heritage, with this being reflected in celebrations like the Festa do Mar.

== Background ==
In front of Malpica are the Illas Sisargas, a small archipelago used as shelter by numerous marine birds. Main sights include the Church of Santiago de Mens, in Romanesque style (12th century) and the dolmen of Pedra da Arca.

== Demography ==
From:INE Archiv

== International relations ==
=== Twin towns – sister cities ===
Malpica de Bergantiños is twinned with:

- Malpica de Tajo, Castilla-La Mancha, Spain

== See also ==
- Way of the Lighthouses
- List of municipalities in A Coruña
