= Roman cities in Portugal =

The territory of modern-day Portugal was Romanized following the events of the Second Punic War (3rd century BCE), through the Roman conquest of the Iberian Peninsula.

The Romans founded cities and Romanized some previously existing settlements. Generally, cities with names ending in -briga are believed to have predated the Romanization of the territory, although there are exceptions. For instance, Augustobriga, near Cáceres, Spain, is named after Augustus, suggesting that some -briga names might have been given to cities during Roman rule.

Out of the 32 mansiones in Lusitania mentioned in ancient Itinerarium sources, only about half have been identified.

== Administrative divisions ==
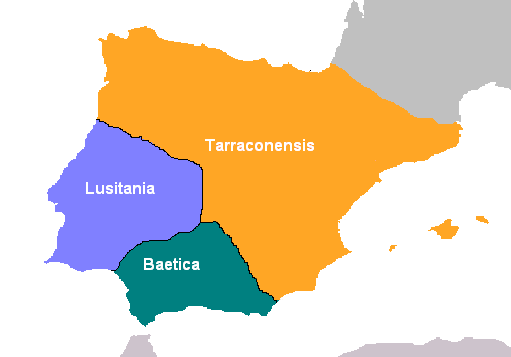
Augustus' provincial division of Hispania

During the era of Augustus, the Iberian Peninsula was divided into the provinces of Lusitania, Baetica, and Tarraconensis. These provinces were further subdivided into conventūs. The province of Lusitania was divided into the conventūs of Augusta Emerita (modern-day Mérida, in Spain), Pax Julia (Beja, Portugal), and Scalabis (Santarém, Portugal). However, Roman cities held more significance than conventūs in the Peninsula.

The primary types of Roman cities were the coloniae (Roman settlements established by order of the Roman government) and the municipia (settlements that typically existed before Romanization). In the Iberian Peninsula, the terms municipia and civitātes are used interchangeably.

In 73/74 CE, the lex Flavia municipalis enacted by Vespasian granted all urban centres in modern-day Portugal Latin rights, and over time, the distinction between urban centres (including municipia and coloniae) lessened following this law. Everyday administration was carried out by aediles, qaestores and duumviri, who communicated with the imperial government.

Villae were settlements engaged in producing agricultural goods for local markets, encompassing multiple buildings such as residential houses, barns, and gardens. In Lusitania, most villae were situated around a few cities (Olisipo, Ebora Liberalitas Julia, and Augusta Emerita) or dispersed along the southern coast.

== Map of Roman cities and towns in Portugal ==
Roman cities in Portugal (Portugal)

== List of Roman cities and towns in Portugal ==
Latin name (variant(s))	Type	English name (native language(s))
Aeminium	Municipium	Coimbra
Aquae Flaviae	Municipium	Chaves
Ammaia	Villa	São Salvador da Aramenha, Marvão
Arabriga		Alenquer
Arandis		Garvão, a parish of Ourique
Aretium		Alvega
Aviarium, Averius		Aveiro
Baesuris, Esuri		Castro Marim
Balsa		west of Tavira
Elbocoris		Bobadela, Oliveira do Hospital
Bracara Augusta		Braga
Brigantia		Bragança
Caeciliana	Villa	(between Caetobriga and Malateca)
Caetobriga		Setúbal
Calipolis		Vila Viçosa
Castra Leuca		Castelo Branco
Cilpes		Silves
Aravorum	Civitas	Marialva Castle, near Mêda
Calabriga	Civitas	Monte do Castelo, Almendra
Cobelcorum	Civitas	Almofala, Figueira de Castelo Rodrigo
Centum Cellas	Villa	Colmeal da Torre, a parish of Belmonte
Collipo		São Sebastião do Freixo - Golpilheira, Batalha
Conimbriga	Municipium	Condeixa-a-Nova, south of Coimbra (the inhabitants of Conimbriga fled to nearby Aeminium, the ancient name of Coimbra, in 468)
Conistorgis		(location unknown in the Algarve or Baixo-Alentejo)
Dipo		Elvas
Ebora, Ebora Cerealis, Liberalitas Julia	Municipium	Évora
Eburobritium, Eburobrittium	Civitas	Óbidos
Egitandiorum, Egiptania, Civitas Igaeditanorum	Municipium	Idanha-a-Velha
Equabona		Coina, a parish of Barreiro
Guimaranis, Vimaranis		Guimarães
Ipses		Alvor
Lacobriga, Laccobriga	Municipium	Lagos
Lamecum		Lamego
Lancobriga		Fiães, a parish of Santa Maria da Feira
Lorica		Loriga, a parish of Seia
Malateca		Marateca, a parish of Palmela
Metallum Vipascense		Mina de Aljustrel, central Alentejo
Mirobriga Celticorum		Santiago do Cacém
Mondobriga		Alter do Chão
Moron		near Santarém
Myrtilis Iulia		Mértola
Sellium, Nabantia, Nabancia, Selleum		Tomar
Olisipo, Olisipo Felicitas Iulia, Felicitas Julia Olissipo, Ulyssipolis, Ulisseia	Municipium	Lisbon (Lisboa)
Ossonoba		Faro
Pacensis, Pax Iulia, Pax Augusta	Colonia, Civitas	Beja
Portus Alacer		Portalegre
Portus Cale		Porto
Portus Hannibalis		Portimão
Urbs Imperatoria Salacia, Bevipo		Alcácer do Sal
Scalabis, Scalabis Preasidium Iulium, Scallabi Castrum, Præsidium Iulium, Scallabis Praesidium Iulium, Scallabis Iulia	Colonia	Santarém
Sirpe		Serpa
Sinus		Sines
Talabara		Alpedrinha, a parish of Fundão
Talabriga		Marnel, near Águeda
Tongobriga		Freixo, Marco de Canaveses
Tritium		Covilhã
Tubucci Aurantes		Abrantes
Veniatia		Vinhais
Euracini	Villa	Póvoa de Varzim
Vipasca		Aljustrel
Vissaium		Viseu
