= Conímbriga =

Former Roman settlement in Portugal

Roman city of Conímbriga
- Ruins of Conímbriga
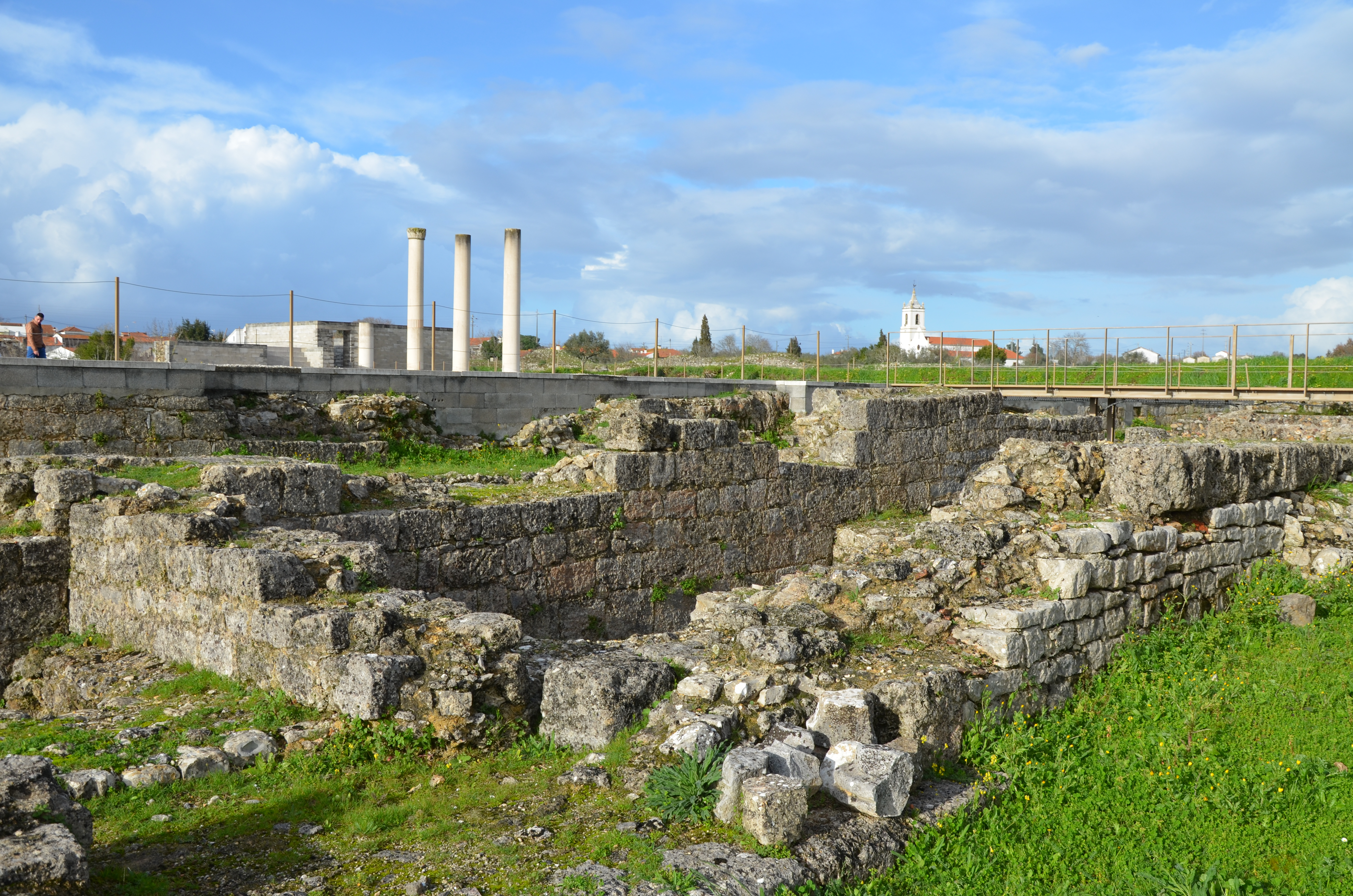
- A view of the ruins of the Roman settlement of Conímbriga
- Interactive map of Roman city of Conímbriga
- 40°5′58″N 8°29′26″W
- Type: Ruins
- Location: Coimbra, Baixo Mondego, Centro, Portugal

Site notes
- Archaeologists: unknown
- Owner: Portuguese Republic
- Public access: Public Ramal da EN342, near the village of Condeixa-a-Velha

Conímbriga is one of the largest Roman settlements excavated in Portugal, and was classified as a National Monument in 1910. Located in the civil parish of Condeixa-a-Velha e Condeixa-a-Nova, in the municipality of Condeixa-a-Nova, it is situated 2 kilometres (1.2 mi) from the municipal seat and 16 kilometres (9.9 mi) from Coimbra (the Roman town of Aeminium).

Conímbriga is a walled urban settlement, encircled by a curtain of stone structures approximately 1,500 metres (4,900 ft) long. Entrance to the settlement is made from vaulted structures consisting of two doors (one on hinges), at one time defended by two towers. The walls are paralleled by two passages, channelled to excavations, that remove water infiltration from the walls. The urban settlement consists of various structures, including a forum, basilica and commercial shops, thermal spas, aqueducts, insulae, homes of various heights (including interior patios) and domus (such as the Casa dos Repuxos and Casa de Cantaber), in addition to a paleo-Christian basilica.

A visitors' centre (which includes restaurant/café and gift-shop) was constructed to display objects found by archaeologists during their excavations, including coins, surgical tools, utensils and ceramics.

== History ==
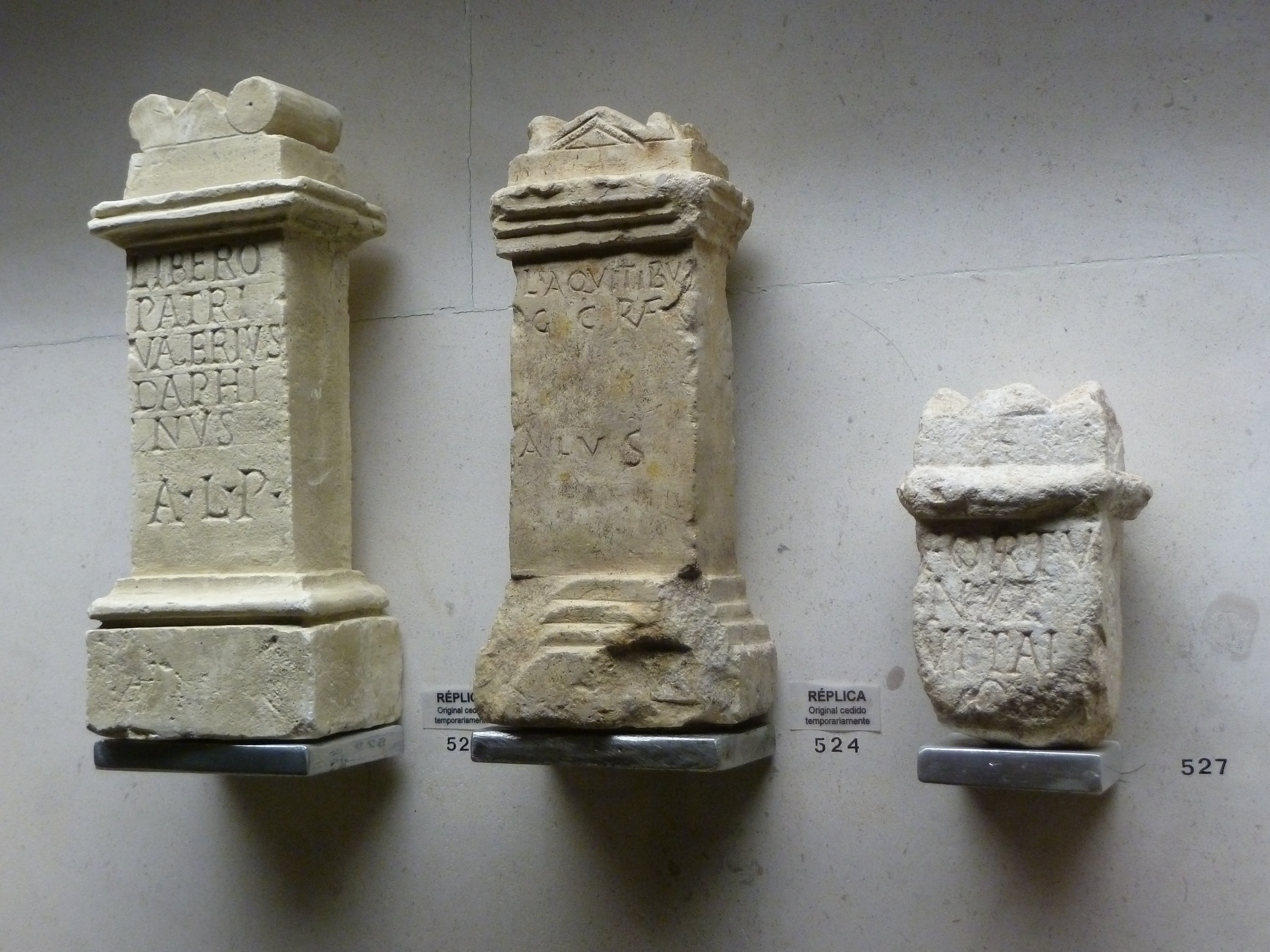
Votive and ceremonial structures

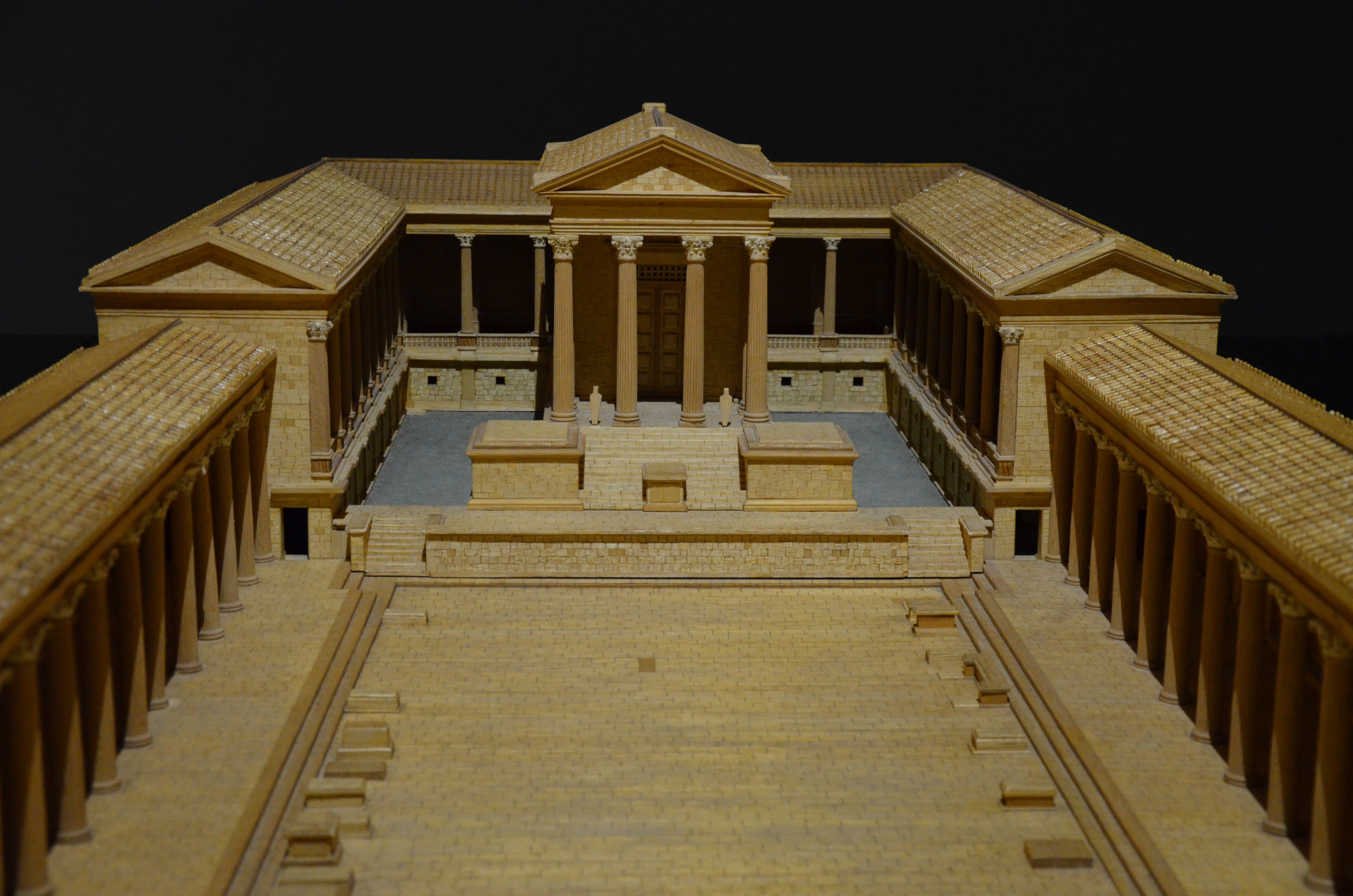
A maquette of the conceived layout of the forum at Conímbriga

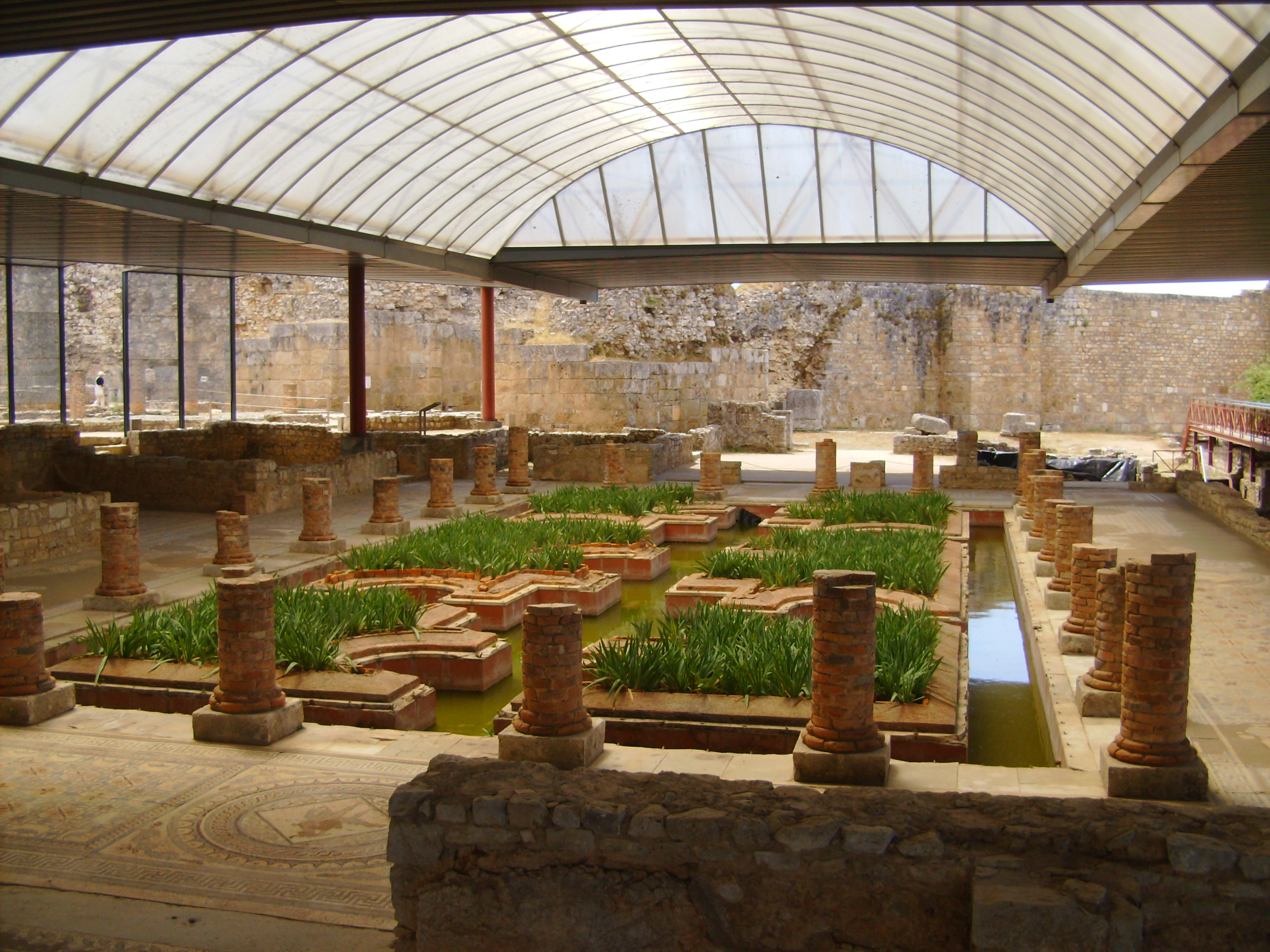
The interior of the Casa dos Repuxos.

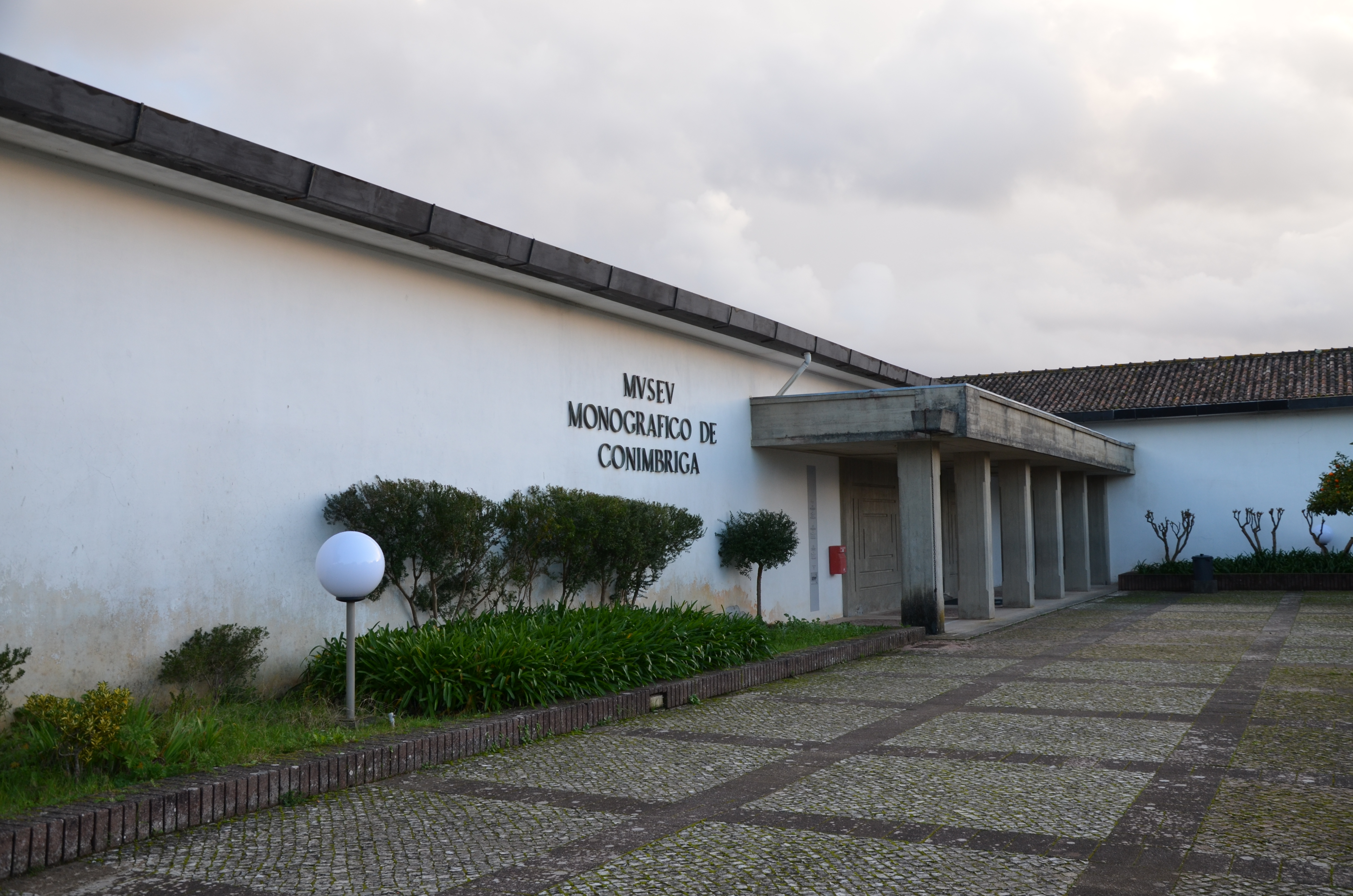
A view of the Monographic Museum at Conímbriga.

=== Antiquity ===
Like many archaeological sites, Conímbriga evolved sequentially and built up by successive layers, with the primary period of occupation beginning in the 9th century BCE; during this period the area was occupied by the Castro culture. Before the Roman occupation, the indigenous Conii peoples (who would later settle in southern Portugal) lived here.

The Conímbriga designation came from conim, used by indigenous peoples to designate "the place of rocky eminence," and briga, the Celtic suffix meaning "citadel". This site had become a junction between the road that linked Olisipo to Bracara Augusta, by way of Aeminium (Coimbra).

Around 139 BCE, Romans began arriving in the area, as a consequence of the expeditionary campaigns of Decimus Junius Brutus. At the time, Conímbriga was already a built-up settlement. The Romans introduced the formal organization of space to the settlement. Owing to the peaceful nature of rural Lusitania, Romanisation of the indigenous population was quick and Conímbriga became a prosperous town.

Between 69 and 79 CE, during the reign of Vespasian, Conímbriga was elevated to the status of municipium. At that time, new urban programs were initiated. Judging by the capacity of the amphitheatre, by this time the city had an estimated population of approximately 10,600. Many of the new colonists (such as the Lucanus, Murrius, Vitellius and Aponia families) came from the Italian peninsula and intermarried with local inhabitants, (such as the Turrania, Valeria, Alios and Maelo families).

Construction of the Casa dos Repuxos began in the 2nd century, likely over a pre-existing structure. At the end of the 3rd century, the Augustian walls were replaced by the existing structures. In addition there was a remodelling of the baths and construction of a majority of the larger homes of the town, culminating in the construction of the paleo-Christian basilica in the 4th century.

Between 465 and 468, invasions by Sueves caused the destruction of the city and its inhabitants dispersed, including some taken into slavery.

=== Middle Ages and Kingdom of Portugal ===
The bishopric of Conímbriga was established between 561 and 572 CE, under the direction of Lucêncio, its first bishop. By 589 CE, Conímbriga ceased to be the episcopal seat, as this was transferred to Aeminium, which later became Coimbra.

During the reign of King Manuel (1519), the king ordered the inscriptions on the facade of the Church of Condeixa-a-Nova.

In the 18th century, Conímbriga was first referred to in parochial documents, resulting in the 1869 visit by Hubner to the site. In 1873, the Instituto de Coimbra (Coimbra Institute) was created, in addition to the formation of a museum dedicated to archaeology, instigating the first formal excavations at Conímbriga in 1873. Mosaics were removed from the uncovered homes and the first excavations were made in 1899, resulting in the plan for the oppidum.

=== Republic ===
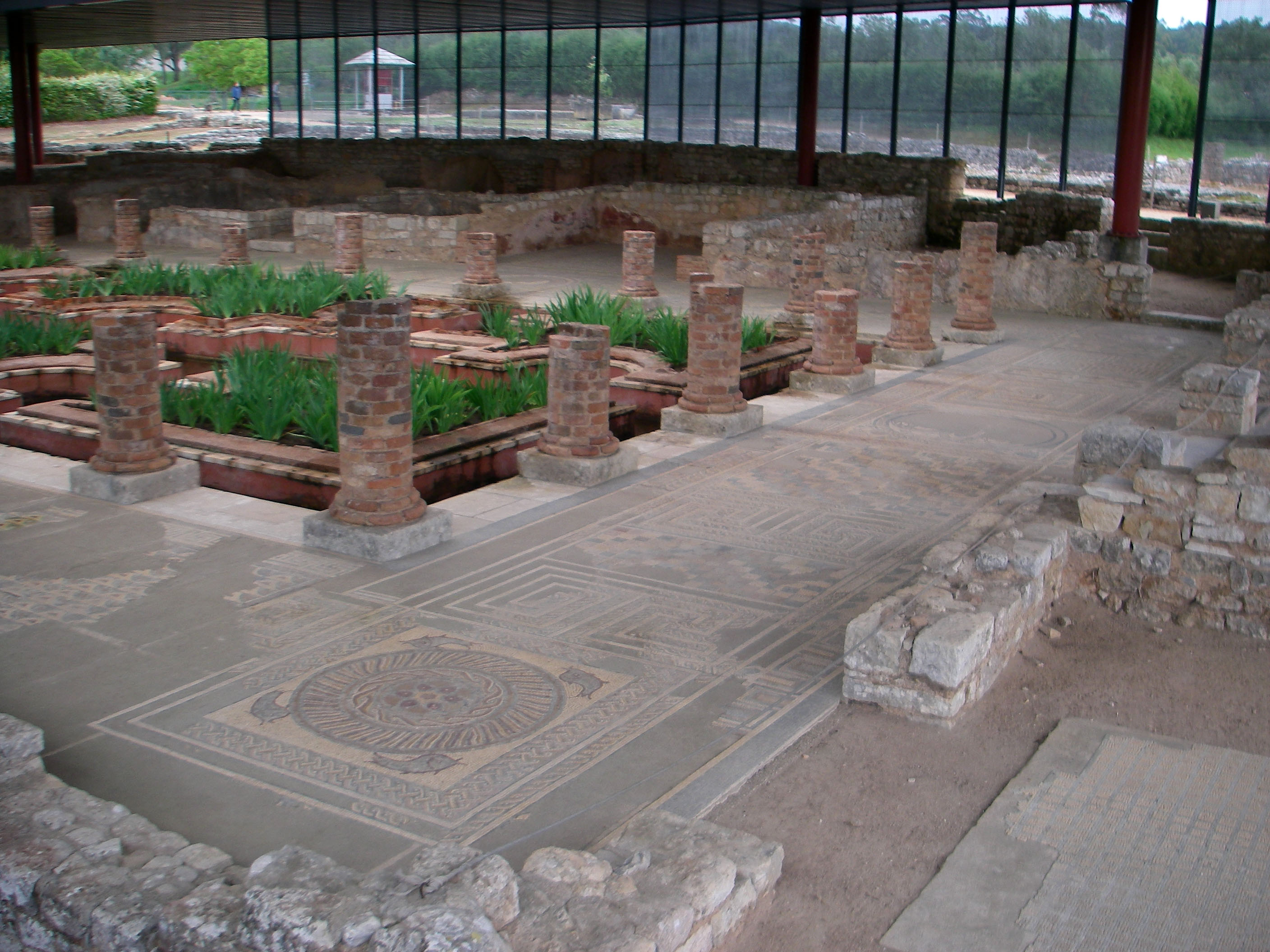
The House of Fountains (Casa dos Repuxos) is believed to date from the Severan period (from 193-235) and the mosaics depict hunting scenes with dogs, Bacchus (Dionysus) as well as the heroic cycles of Perseus and the Gorgon. The house was demolished to make way for a protective wall built during the later stages of the imperial period as the area came under attack from invading armies of Swabians who would establish the Kingdom of the Suebi.

In 1911, the Coimbra Institute ceded its collection to the Machado de Castro museum, resulting in the beginning of the studies by Augusto Filipe Simões and António Augusto Gonçalves.

On the occasion of the 11th International Congress on Archaeology and Pre-History (1930) in Portugal, the state acquired the first lands and official excavations on the site. At the time of this congress the eastern gates to the city were unobstructed. The following year the DGEMN started the work of reconstructing and consolidating the ruins, which were continued in 1955.

In 1956, there were archaeological studies of Oppidum Romano, by the Serviços dos Monumentos Nacionais (National Monument Service). New excavations occurred in 1964.

In 1962, the Museu Monográfico de Conímbriga (Conímbriga Monographic Museum) was inaugurated. It was followed in 1964 by the collaboration between this museum and the archaeological mission from the University of Bordeaux: under the direction of J. Bairrão Oleiro, Robert Étienne and Jorge de Alarcão, the centre of the Roman city was unearthed.

In 1970, the work with the mosaics was consolidated, at a time when the monograph museum was expanded (with a basement, installations for a guard and interior shelter). But, throughout the transition to Portuguese democracy and beyond, the team at Conímbriga attempted to consolidate and maintain the site. The early work continued into 1974, with the consolidation, restoration and expansion of the museum and 1975, with the prospecting into other zones, the paving of walkways, landscaping and solutions to drainage issues.

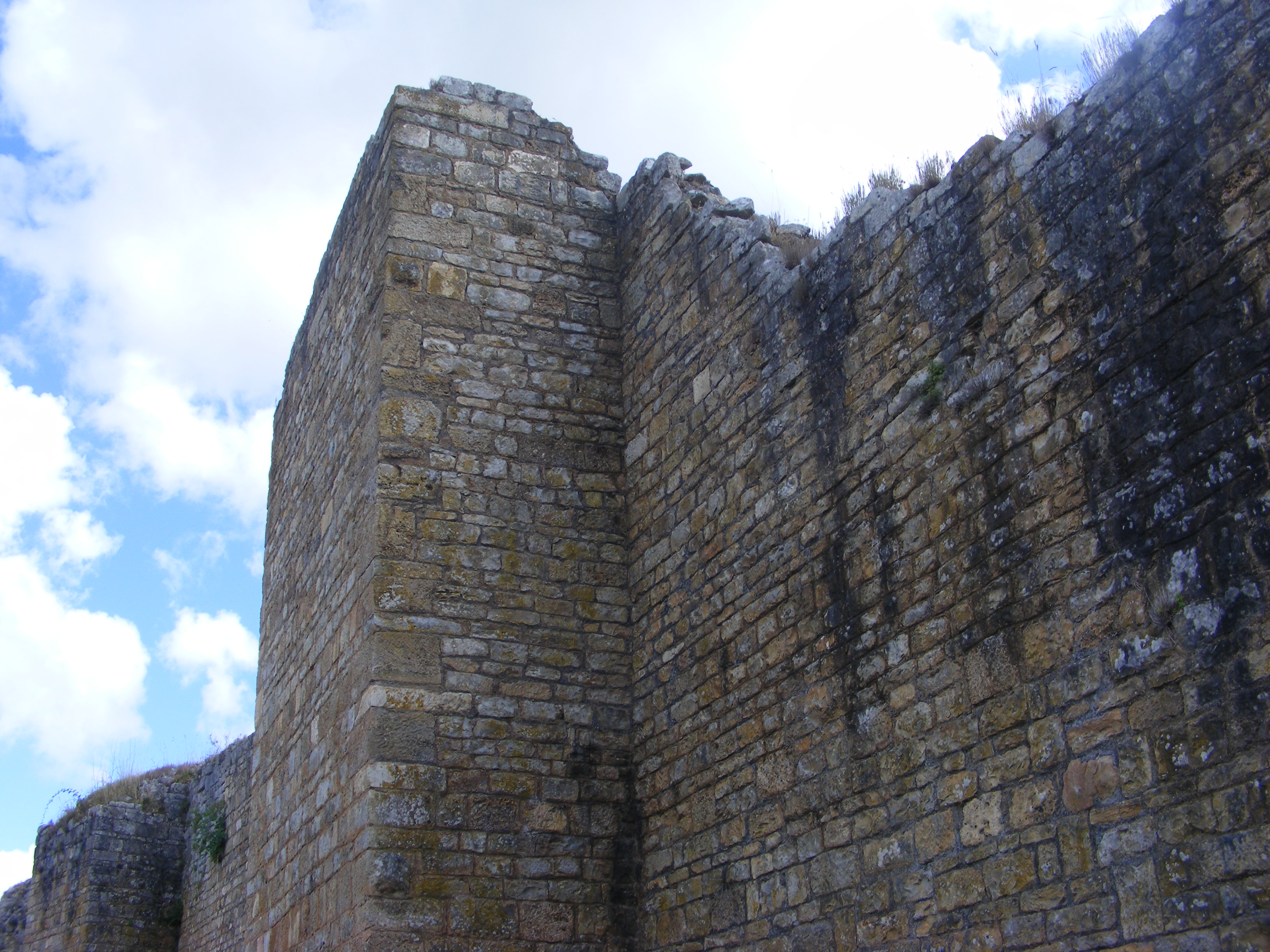
In the later part of the Roman era, a huge defensive wall measuring 6m in height and 3m in width was built virtually cutting the city in two. Due to this rush for defensive purposes, the population used materials taken from the buildings of the abandoned part of the city as building materials of the wall. The city's boundaries were shortened as the inhabitants withdrew to a smaller, more defensible area.

In 1976, the gazebo and interior of the older Monographic Museum was repaired. These repairs continued into 1977, with expansion of the museum, restoration of the facades, the old portico and the colonnade was transformed into an internal gallery, the arrangement of the principal atrium and creating a gutters to alleviate pedestrian walkways. The following year began the construction of a ticket booth in cement and glass, while in 1979 an electrical transformer and litter incineration unit were installed. The installation of electrical devices, illumination and climate control units in the museum occurred between 1981 and 1982. The first permanent public exposition was opened in April 1985. In 1986 a new awning was installed to cover the Casa dos Repuxos.

During the 1990s, there were projects to remodel the museum and upgrade the displays and various installations to support visitors, under the direction of Cruz Alarcão, Arquitectos Lda. They were re-contracted in 2004–2005 to improve the site, including the reconstruction of the Augustian forum and southern thermal spas, and construction of a small structure for spectacles (consisting of a roadway, stage and bunks molded to the terrain) alongside the aqueduct.

On 9 August 1991, the museum became part of the Instituto Português de Museus (Portuguese Institute for Museums), leading to the 1 June 1992 transfer to the Instituto Português do Património Arquitetónico (IPPAR), and then on 29 March 2007 to the Instituto dos Museus e Conservação (Institute for Museums and Conservation).

== Architecture ==
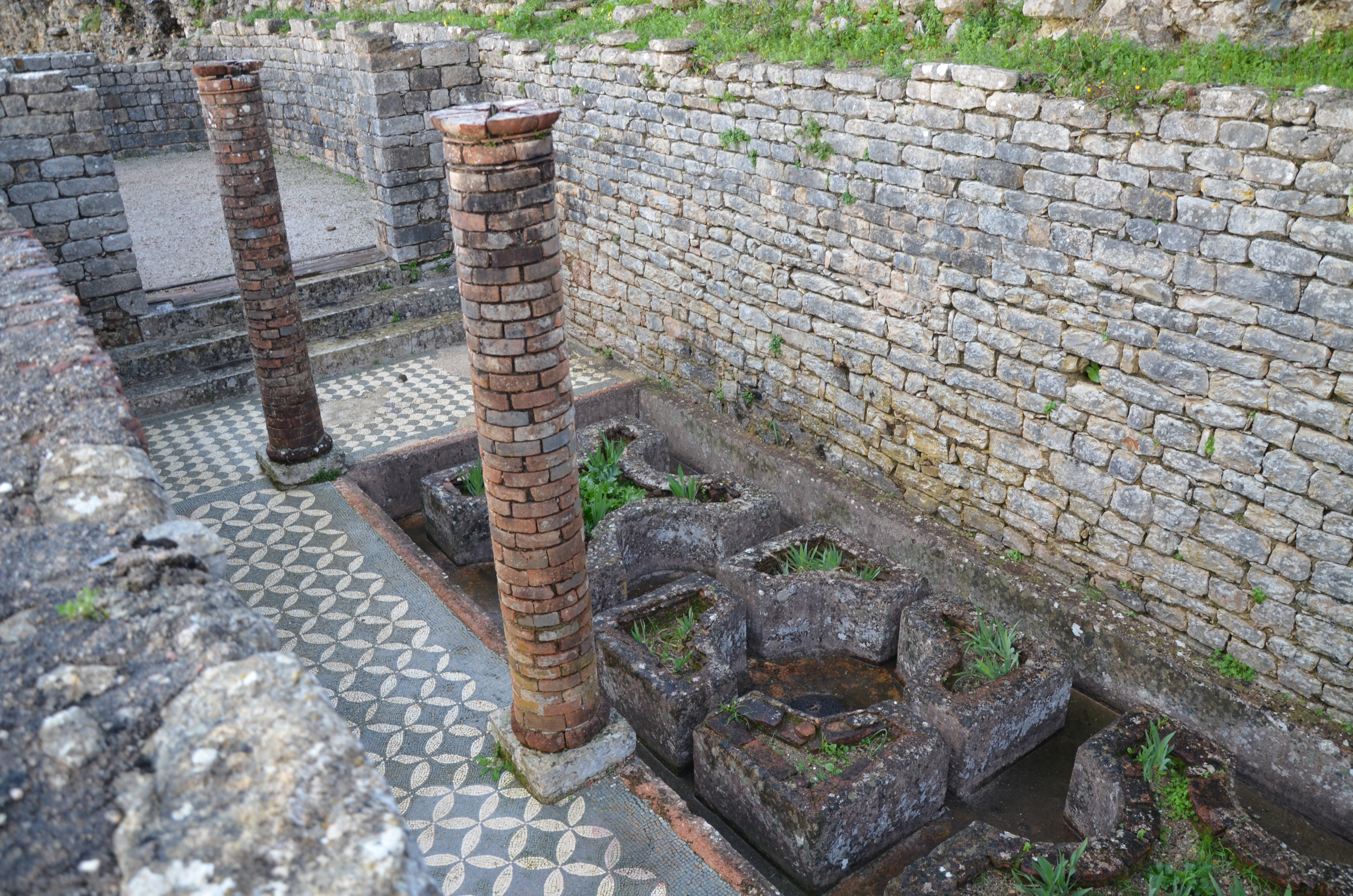
Sections of a residential domus with water gardens.

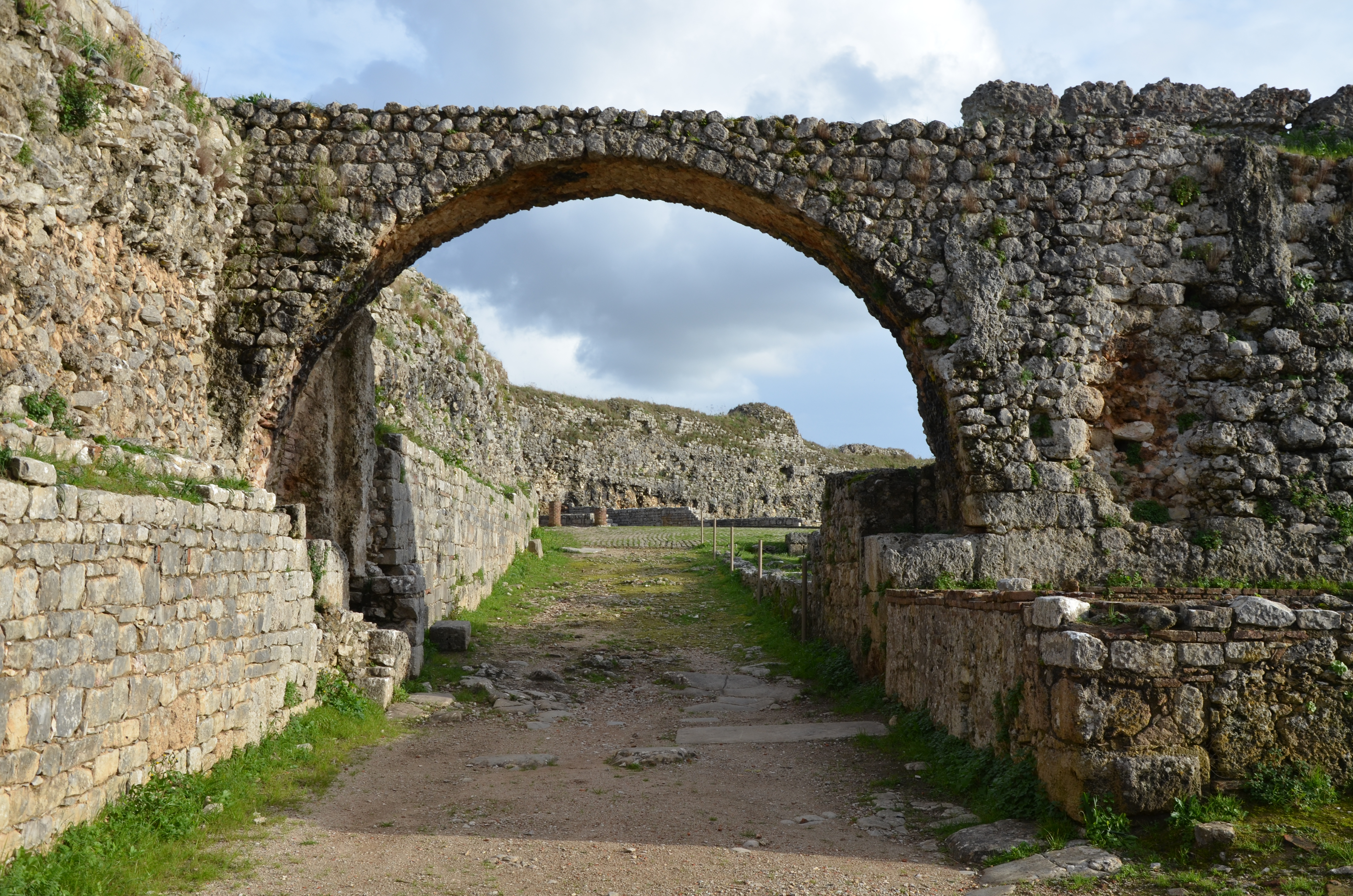
An arched section of the aqueduct in one of the alleyways.

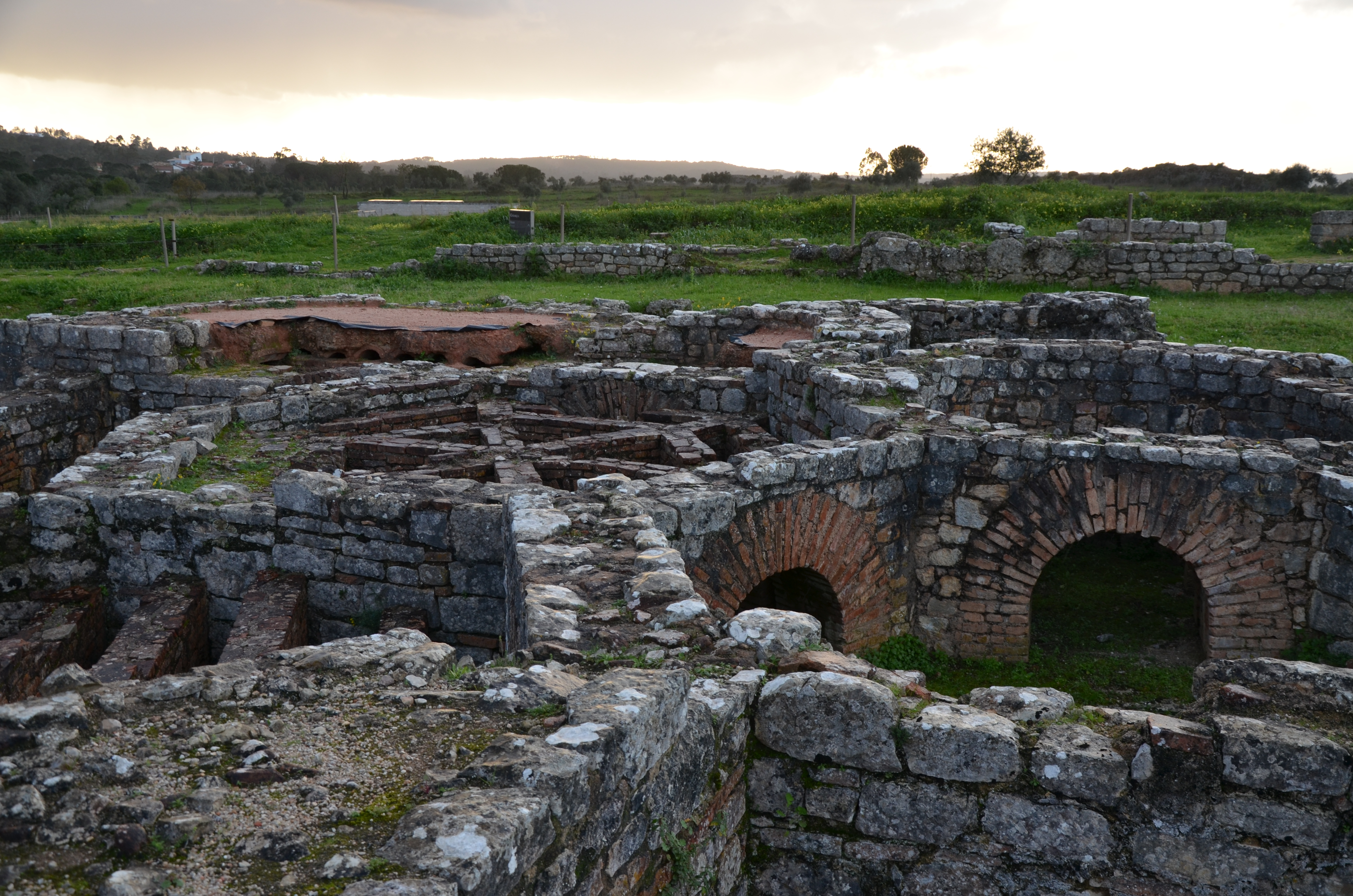
The "skeleton" of the thermal baths.

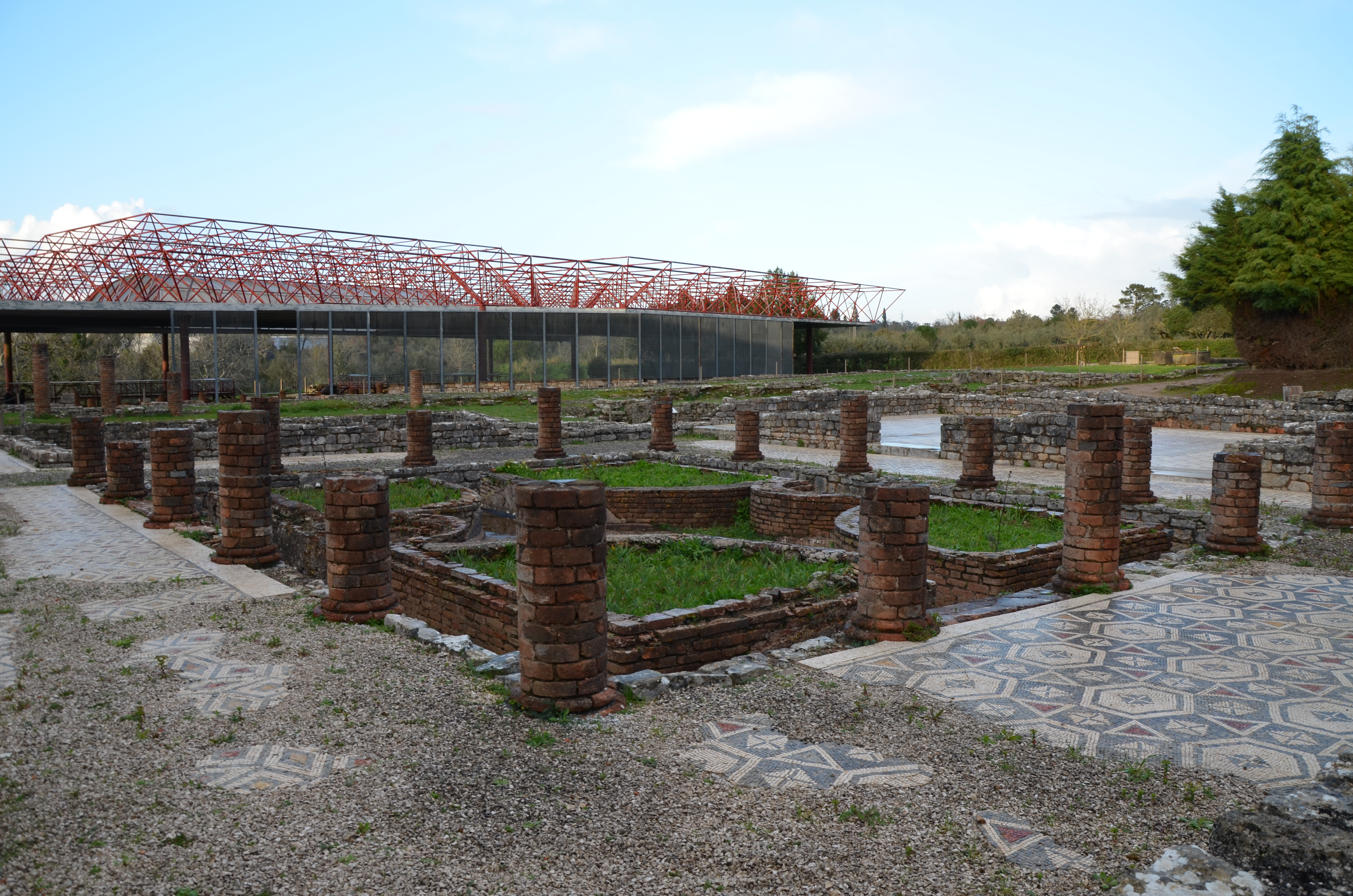
The exposed ruins and the gazebo protecting the Casa dos Repuxos.

The excavation site and visitors' centre are located on the outskirts of the rural community of Condeixa-a-Nova, based on a plateau-shaped triangular spur over two deep depressions (one occupied by the Ribeira dos Mouros).

Although Conimbriga was not the largest Roman city in Portugal, it is the best preserved, with archaeologists estimating that only 10 percent of the city had been excavated as of 2005.

The urbanized civitas includes integrated structures starting from the Iron Age and extending to the 5th century. There were specifically three phases of spatial organization: from the 1st century BC, under the reign of Augustus, a late Republican forum (which included a crypto-portico, basilica, curia and commercial shops), thermal baths, an aqueduct and pre-Roman residential buildings; a 1st-century AD group, established under Flavius, that included a reconstructed Imperial forum, Vitruvian baths and a revised urban plan; and a 3rd-century settlement that fell within revised walls.

The civil and residential buildings included numerous examples of remodeled and reused structures dating from the first century BC. Most of these homes were insulae (houses with more than one floor), with open patios or courtyards, and domus (such as the Casa dos Repuxos and Casa de Cantaber) with peristyles.

The House of Cantaber (Casa de Cantaber) has been known since the first excavations began in Conímbriga at the end of the 19th century, having been the subject of intermittent interventions throughout the 20th century. Cantaber was the city's leading aristocrat in the 5th century and was murdered in his own home by the invading Suebi. His wife and children were kidnapped and sold into slavery in distant lands. The house attributed to Cantaber is the largest known private residence in the excavated area of Conimbriga and was more than 3,260 square metres, with 40 rooms and even a hypocaust, an ingenious system in which air heated in a furnace circulated under the floor and through the perforated bricks placed inside the walls, having been built in the first century of our era. The construction of the private baths in the old garden of the house dates back a long way. These baths were also successively remodelled.

Most of the private and public buildings in Conímbriga featured abundant decorative materials, including mosaics, sculptures and painted murals.

There are three distinct baths within the walls: the Great Southern Baths, the Baths of the Wall, and the Baths of the Aqueduct. The network of stone heating ducts under the (now-missing) floors is the most distinct feature of the Roman baths.

The amphitheatre, dating from the end of the Julio-Claudian dynasty, takes advantage of a natural depression that surrounded the city to the north. It was identified in 1993 by Virgílio H. Correia, and excavations began in 2012–2013. Part of the amphitheatre, consisting of three entryways, was located below local homes in Condeixa-a-Nova. The 5000-person-capacity theatre was 90 by 60 by 20 metres (295 ft × 197 ft × 66 ft), and 4 metres (13 ft) underground. Some rural homes on the site were built using part of the structure.

The robust, rustic construction of the 1,500-metre (4,900 ft) city walls suggests that they were built in a hurry. They consist of large, carved, irregular blocks, with most coming from other buildings. The height of the walls varies from 5 metres (16 ft) to 6.5 metres (21 ft).

Dating from the Suebic occupation, there is a paleo-Christian basilica (5th–6th century), which was a reused and transformed domus.

The Luso-French mission (1965–1968) unearthed public structures of great dimensions, whose architecture they reconstructed. Because the city was built in successive phases, early structures that were later modified or replaced cannot be reconstructed with certainty. These Flavian monuments coincide with the location of some important elements, such as the central square.

== See also ==
- Aeminium
- Lusitania
