= Aeminium =

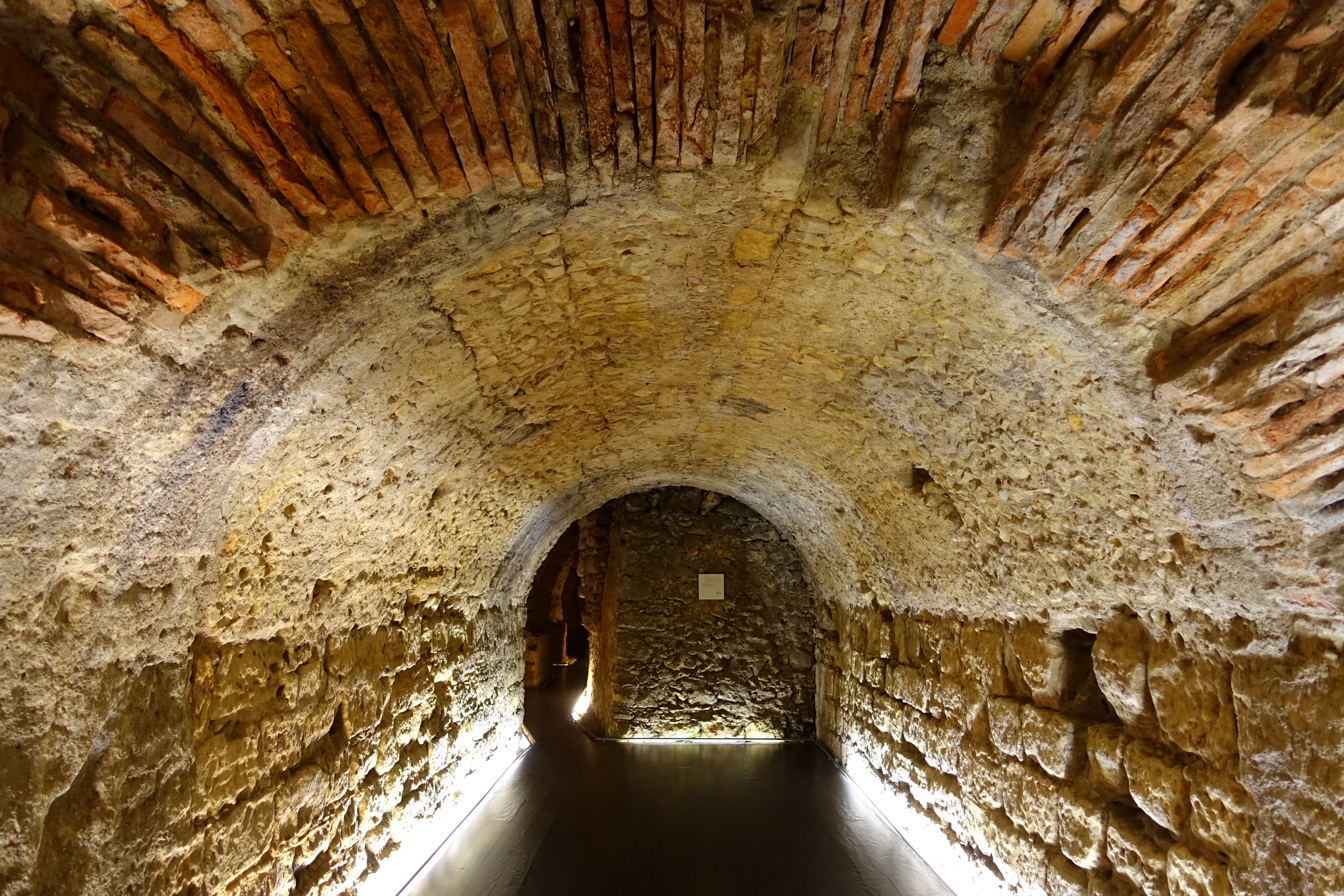
- Cryptoporticus of the ancient forum of Aeminium, under the Machado de Castro National Museum

- Location within Portugal
- 40.208639°N 8.4256983°W
- Type: Settlement
- Cultures: Roman
- Location: Coimbra
- Region: Centro

Aeminium was the ancient name of the city of Coimbra, Portugal.

The Romans founded the civitas of Aeminium in this place at the time of Augustus, which came under the protection of nearby Conímbriga situated some 15 kilometres (9.3 mi) to the south.

The Roman city was encircled by a wall, and followed an orthogonal plan, with the cardo maximus and decumanus maximus crossing at the forum. An aqueduct existed, the remains of which were incorporated into a latter medieval renovation. Locations for the theater and amphitheater were also proposed, but still unconfirmed by archeology. A triumphal arch is documented, but was destroyed in 1778. Also a necropolis was located to the east of the city.

The Suebi razed the nearby township of Conímbriga in 468. Its inhabitants, who had meanwhile fled to Aeminium, kept the original name of their town.

In modern Coimbra there are few remains from ancient Aeminium. The most important is the cryptoporticus, an underground gallery of arched corridors built in the 1st or 2nd century AD to support the forum of the city. Gaius Sevius Lupus was probably the architect. During the Middle Ages the bishop's palace, now turned into the Machado de Castro National Museum, was built over the forum; the cryptoporticus is located under it. The cryptoporticus can be visited through the museum.

== See also ==
- History of Portugal
- Lusitania
- Roman cities in Portugal
