= Ebora Liberalitas Julia =

Roman municipium

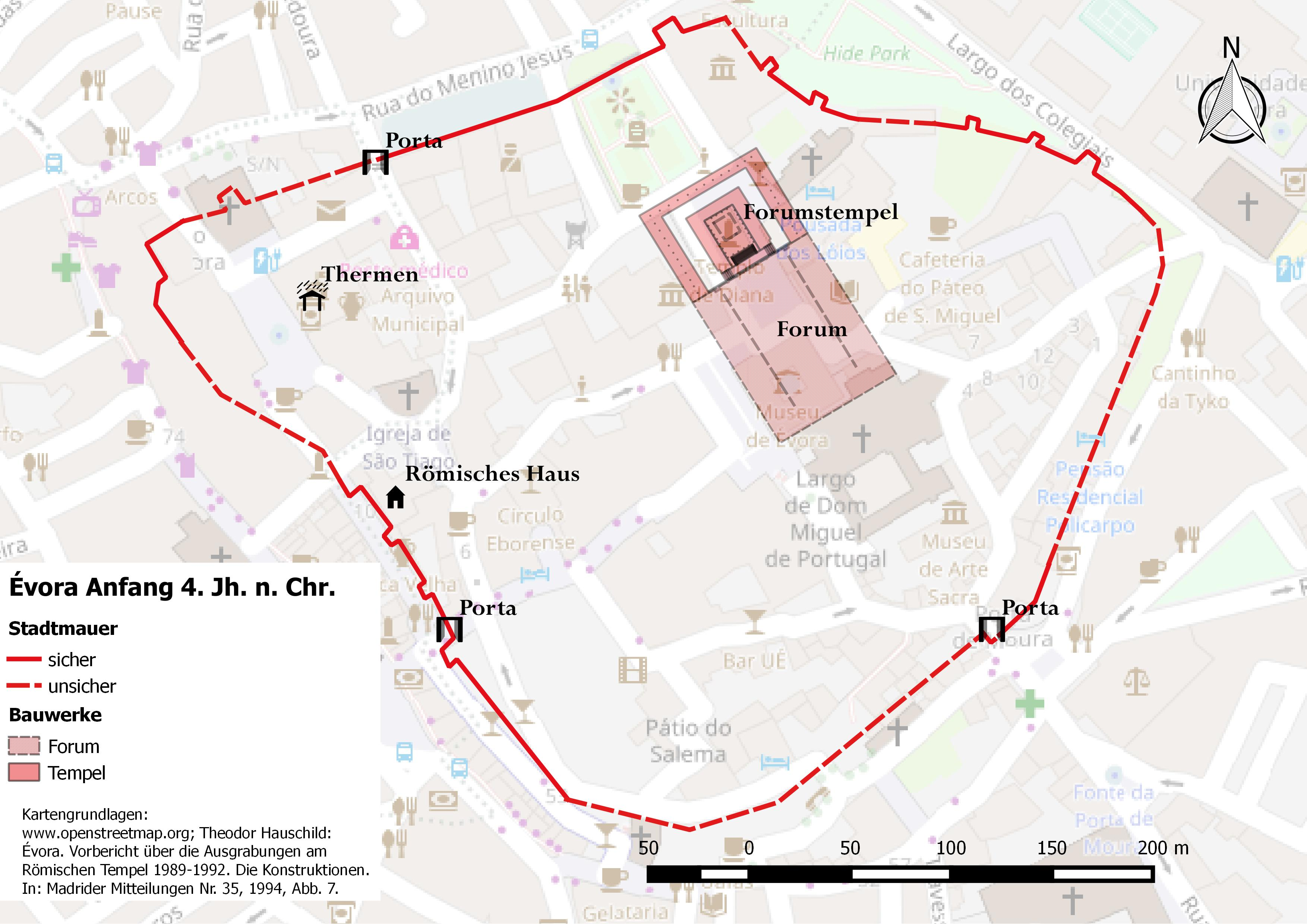
Plan of Ebora Liberalitas Julia

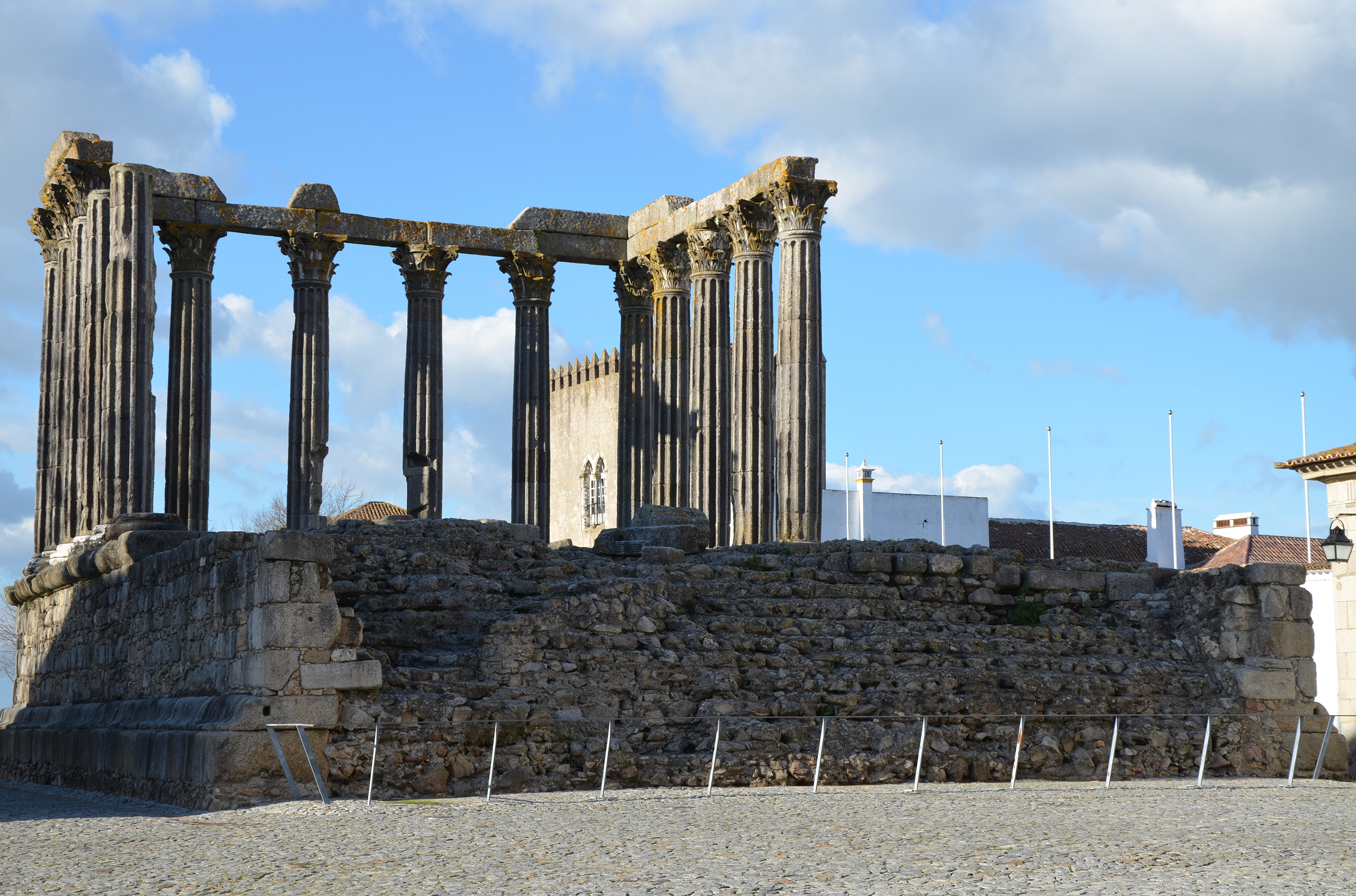
The Roman Temple of Évora

Ebora Liberalitas Julia is the name of a Roman municipium that gave rise to the Portuguese district capital Évora in the Alentejo region. While the name "Ebora" indicates a Celtiberian hill top fortification in the area of the later municipia or in its vicinity the first archaeological evidence of a settlement is from the Early Roman Empire. Early Roman activities on the Iberian peninsula were limited to the areas previously partially populated by Greeks and Punic areas along the south and east coast. The area of today's Alentejo probably did not come under Roman control until the middle of the 2nd century BC. The name addition "Iulia" in the Roman name Évoras infers the emergence of the municipium under the Julians and their representative Gaius Iulius Caesar. But since clear traces of extensive infrastructures from this time and in the surrounding area are missing, it is considered more probable that Évora only came into being as a municipium after the Pax Romana under Octavian in 30 BC. The suffix "Liberalitas Iulia" should be interpreted in this context as an indication of peace. The first reference to Évora as a municipium is found in a list of cities in Hispania in the Historia Naturalis of Pliny the Elder to the year 77 A.D.

== Temple of Évora ==
The Roman Temple of Évora (Portuguese: Templo romano de Évora), also referred to as the Templo de Diana (albeit wrongly, after Diana, the ancient Roman goddess of the moon, the hunt, and chastity) is an ancient temple in the Portuguese city of Évora (civil parish of Sé e São Pedro). The temple is part of the historical centre of the city, which was included in the classification by UNESCO as a World Heritage Site. It represents one of the most significant landmarks relating to the Roman and Lusitanian civilizations of Évora and in Portuguese territory.

== Thermes ==
Part of the Roman thermal baths is located in the basement of today's town hall. They are located about 100 meters west of Forum Square and about 10 meters below its level. Today, about 250 m^{2} of the original building complex are covered. The preserved floor plans of the premises suggest a north–south orientation of the building. Among other things preserved is the laconicum. This round room with a diameter of 9 m has four semicircular apse extensions for hot baths and steam baths. In the centre of the room is a circular basin with a diameter of 5 m, which could be entered via three steps, which are embedded in the ground. For the walls of the laconicum two different building methods were used. From the foundation to the height of the floor, heat-resistant opus incertum was used to build the hypocaust. Opus latericium was used for the masonry rising from the floor. The central basin was probably lined with marble slabs on the wall side and the floor was sealed with opus signinum.

== City walls ==
The Roman walls were probably built in the late 3rd or early 4th century AD. In this period, parts of the country were retreating to a shrinking urban area as the Empire declined. This is evident in the overbuilding of parts of the former Roman residential buildings by the wall in the southwest of the municipia on today's Rua de Burgos. Raids of Germanic tribes on Roman territory probably led to an increased need for security and the construction of defenses. The lower parts of the still preserved wall consist of opus quadratum, from hewn granite blocks. The edge length of some still recognizable, square tower foundations corresponds with 4.5 m length or ten times a Roman cubitus. Even parts of the granite cuboid used correspond in height to a cubitus. An origin in Roman times is therefore shown. The wall had a total length of between 1.1 and 1.2 km and covered the central part of the city hill. The built-up area was about 10 hectares and included important public buildings such as the Forum and the thermal baths. Even after the disintegration of the Roman Empire and the seizure of power in the region, first by the Visigoths and after 711 the Moors, the wall probably continued. In 913, the already damaged city wall was partially destroyed and rebuilt in 914 on the remaining parts. Later in the Middle Ages, the wall was still used as a city wall or inner walls and adapted several times and rebuilt. In especially good condition are parts of the original wall visible in the area of today's Rua do Colégio in which the wall is adjacent to a park.

== Economy ==
Pliny refers to Ebora Cerealis in reference to Alentejo being a region of vast open countryside with undulating plains and rich fertile soil producing wheat and other Roman staples, including wine. The Sao Domingos Mine produced gold and silver and copper. (Iberia or modern Spain and Portugal, was one of the richest Roman provinces regarding mineral ores from around the first century BC.)

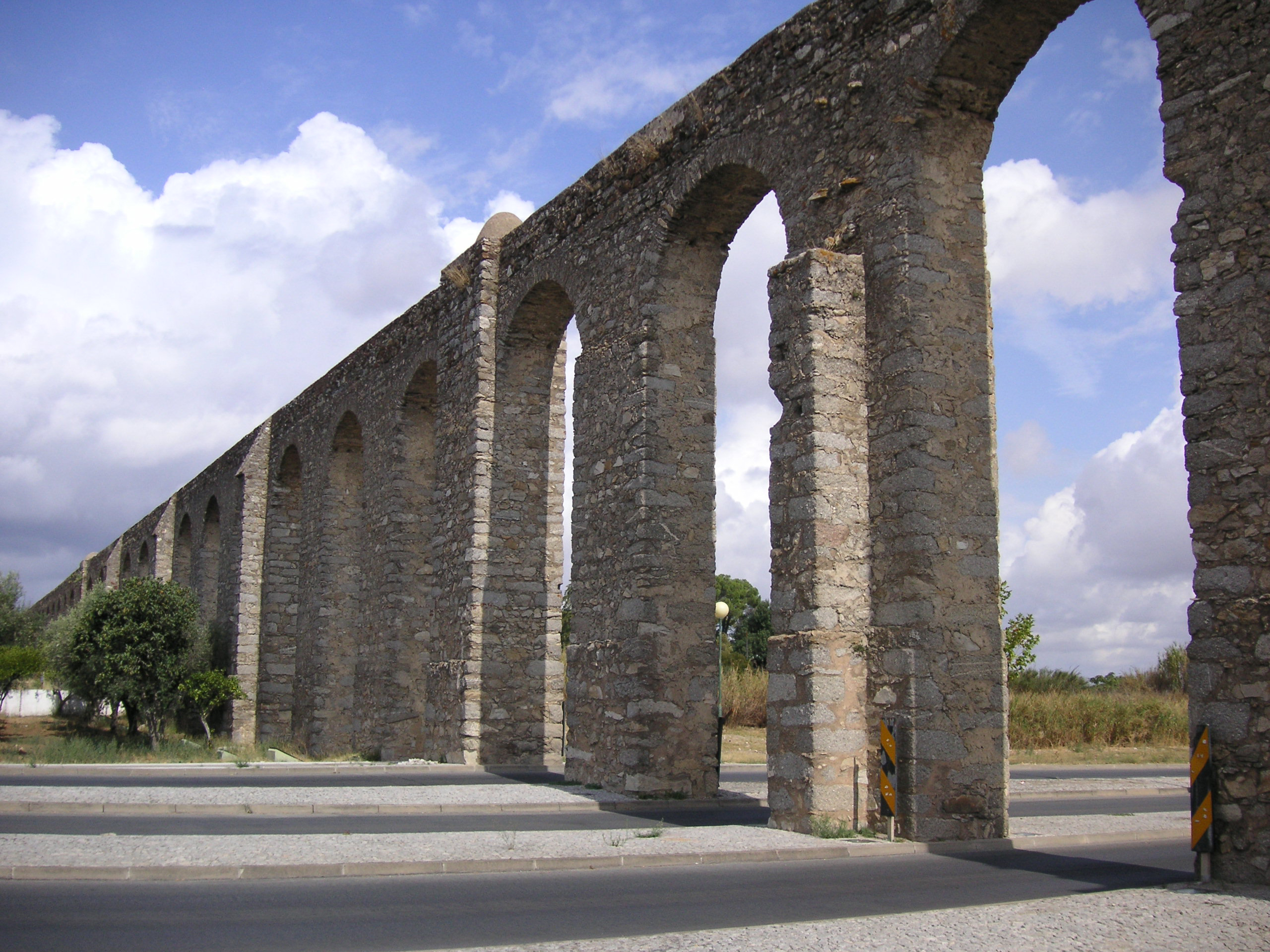
Aqueduto da Água da Prata

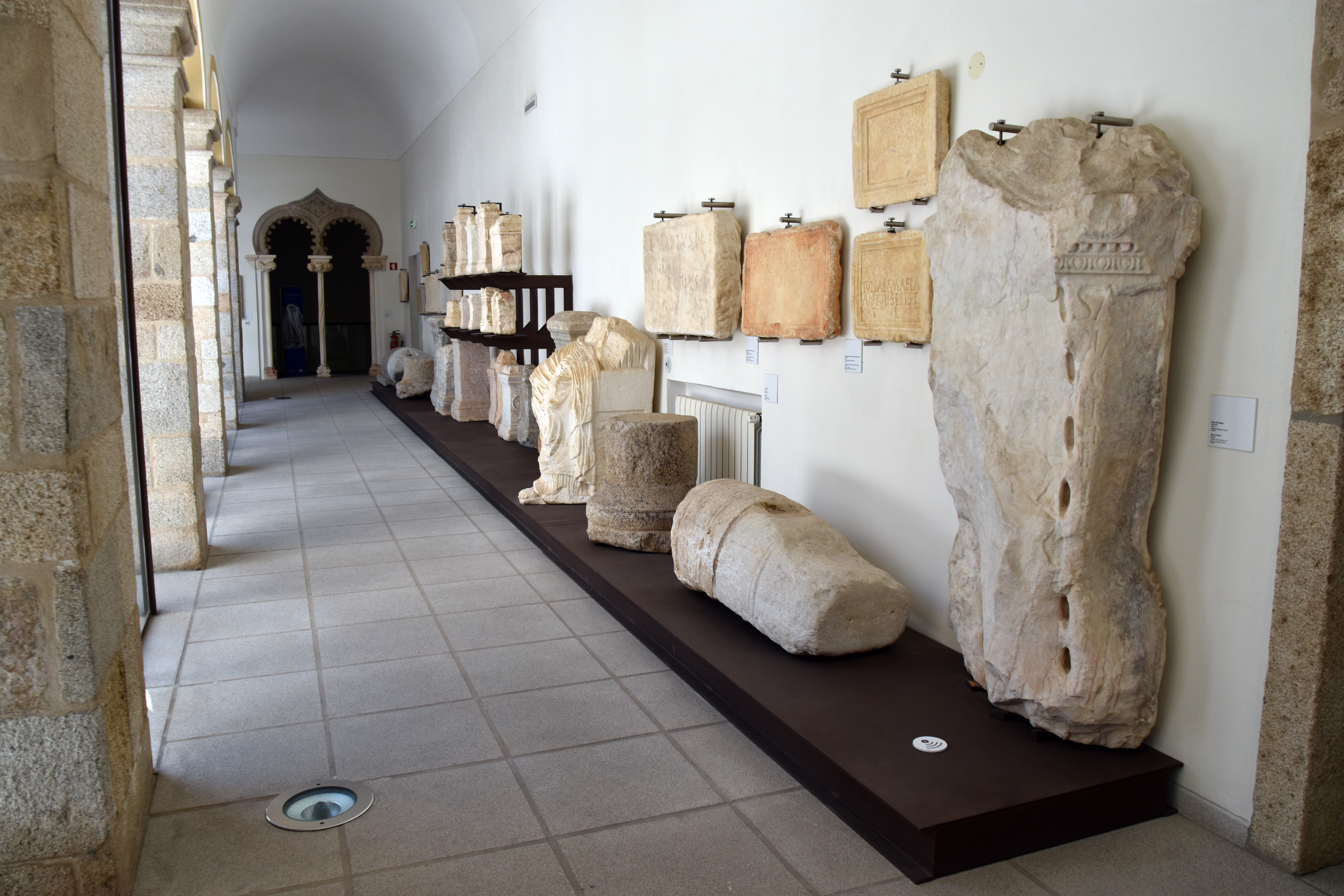
Roman exhibition at Évora Museum

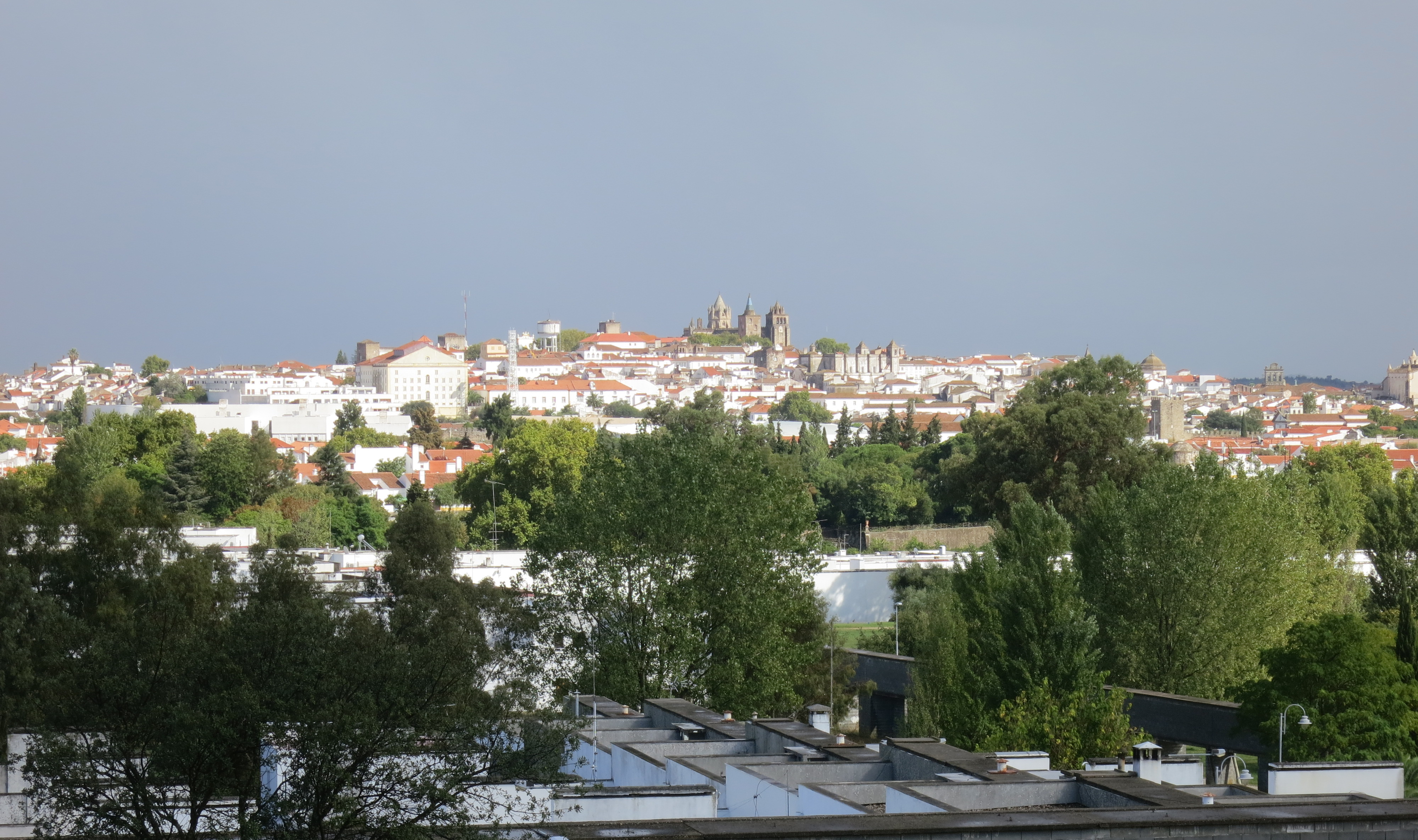
Évora as seen from the Quinta da Malagueira

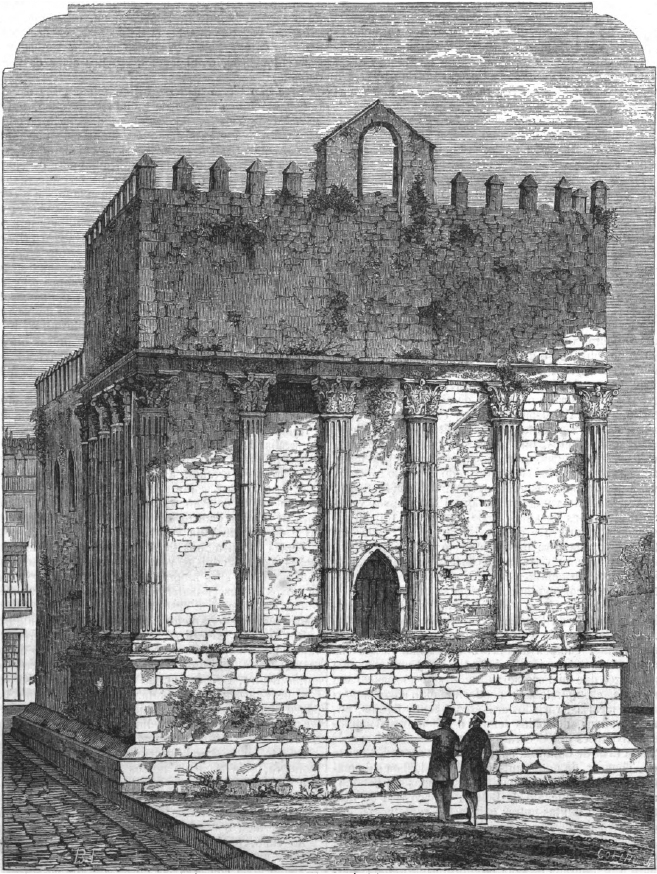
Roman temple of Évora integrated into a church

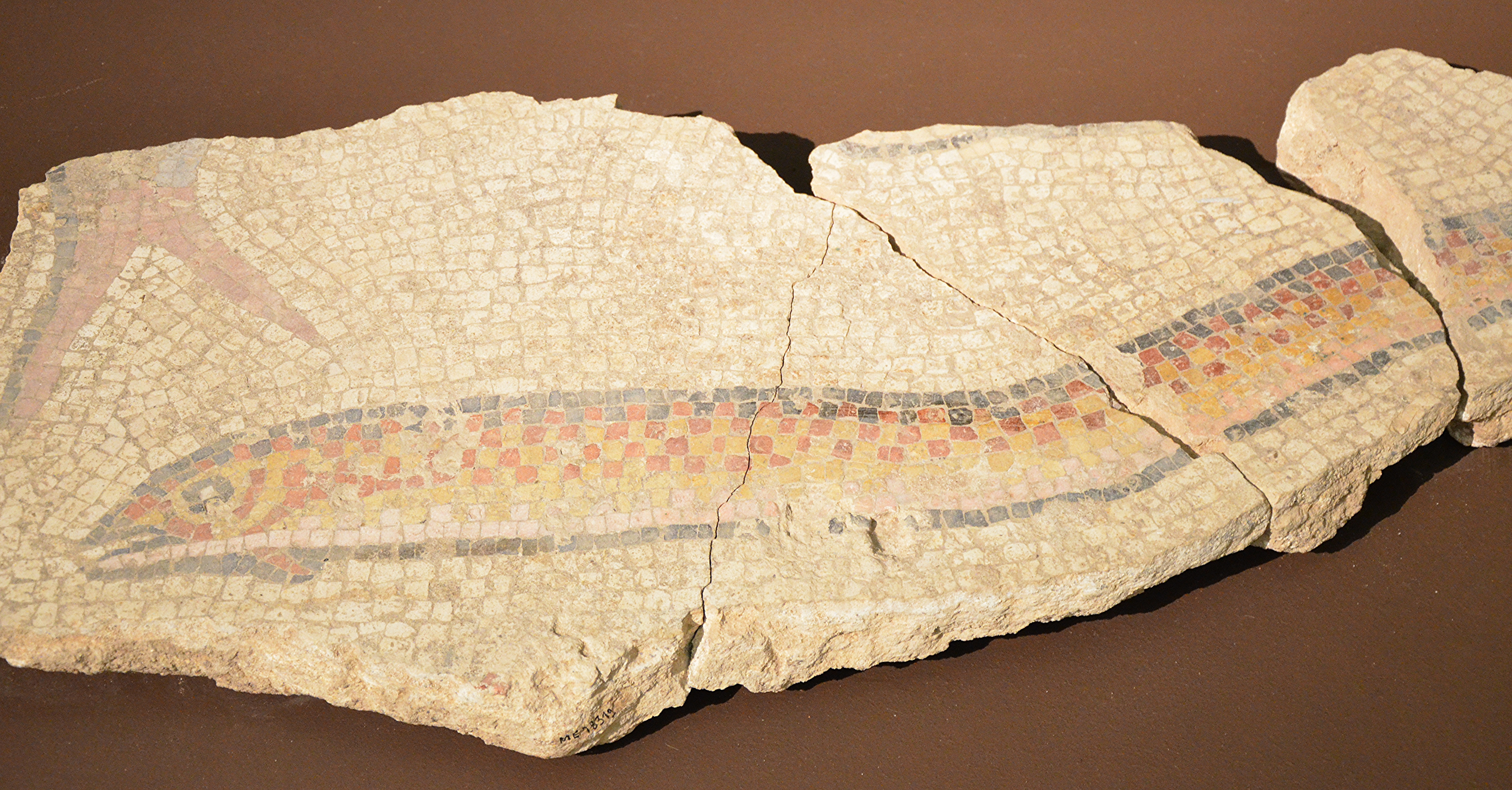
Eel mosaic

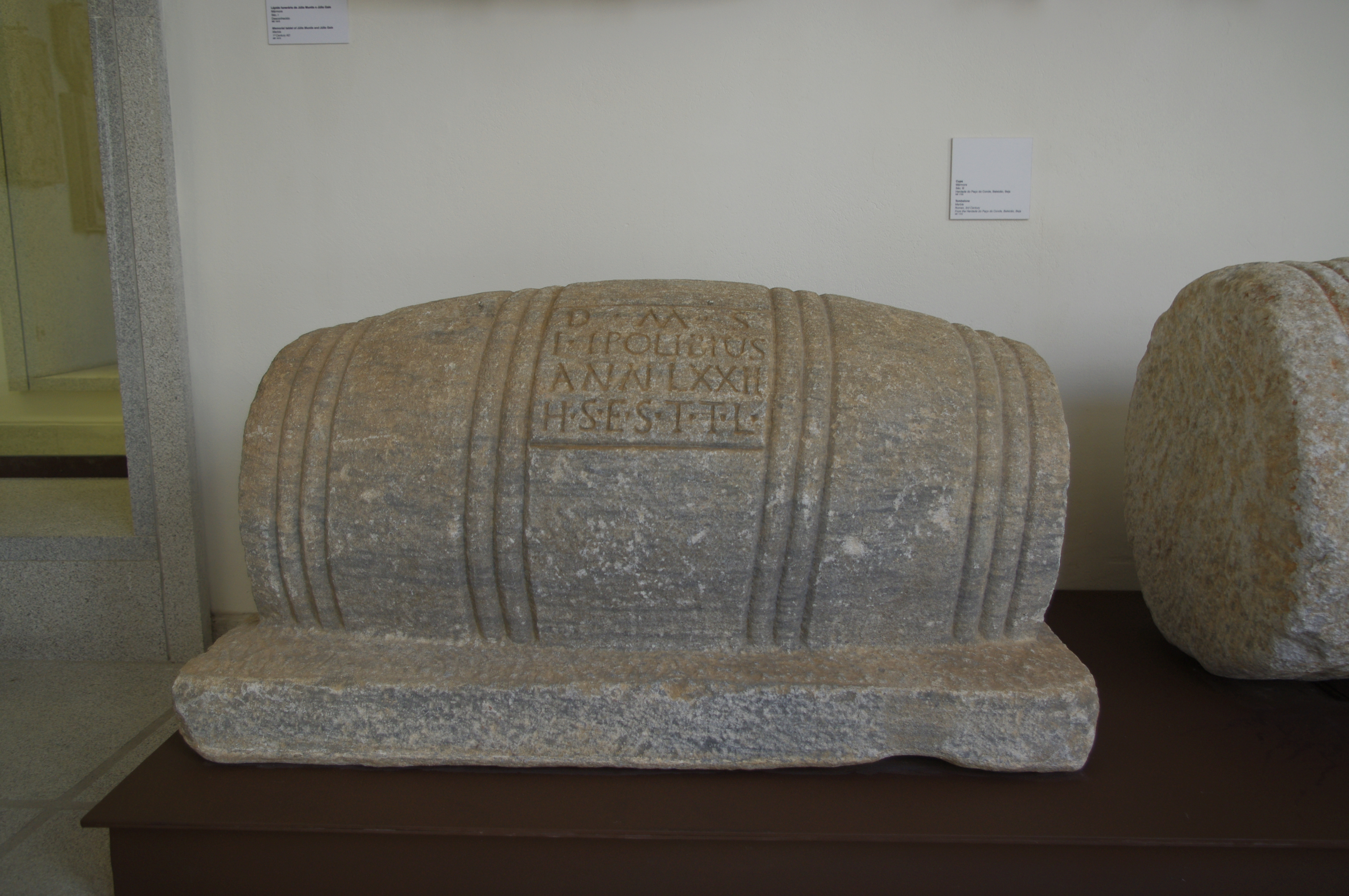
Tombstone of a Roman Wine Maker
