= Lusitania =

Roman province in Hispania (27 BC – c. 410 AD)

Provincia Lusitania
- Province of the Roman Empire
- 27 BC–AD 438
- Capital: Emerita Augusta (Mérida)
- Historical era: Roman Empire
  - Established: 27 BC
  - Disestablished: AD 438
Preceded by
Lusitanians
Succeeded by
Alans
Kingdom of the Suebi
Vandals
Visigothic Kingdom
- Today part of: Portugal; Spain

The Iberian Peninsula in the time of Hadrian (ruled 117–138 AD) showing, in western Iberia, the imperial province of Lusitania (Portugal and Extremadura)

Lusitania (/ˌluː.sɪ.ˈteɪ.ni.ə/; Classical Latin: [luːsiːˈtaːnia]) was an ancient Roman province encompassing most of modern-day Portugal (south of the Douro River) and a large portion of western Spain (the present Extremadura and Province of Salamanca). Romans named the region after the Lusitanians, an Indo-European tribe inhabiting the lands.

The capital Emerita Augusta was initially part of the Roman Republic province of Hispania Ulterior before becoming a province of its own during the Roman Empire.

After Romans arrived in the territory during the 2nd century BC, a war with Lusitanian tribes ensued between 155 and 139 BC, with the Roman province eventually established in 27 BC.

In modern parlance, Lusitania is often synonymous with Portugal, despite the Roman province's capital being located in modern Mérida, Spain.

== Etymology ==
The etymology of the name of the Lusitani (who gave the Roman province its name) remains unclear. Popular etymology connected the name to a supposed Roman demigod Lusus, whereas some early-modern scholars suggested that Lus was a form of the Celtic Lugus followed by another (unattested) root *tan-, supposed to mean "tribe", while others derived the name from Lucis, an ancient people mentioned in Avienius' Ora Maritima (4th century AD) and from tan (-stan in Iranian), or from tain, meaning "a region" or implying "a country of waters", a root word that formerly meant a prince or sovereign governor of a region.

Ancient Romans, such as Pliny the Elder (Natural History, 3.5) and Varro (116 – 27 BC, cited by Pliny), speculated that the name Lusitania had Roman origins, as when Pliny says "lusum enim Liberi Patris aut lyssam cum eo bacchantium nomen dedisse Lusitaniae et Pana praefectum eius universae" [Lusitania takes its name from the Lusus associated with Bacchus and the Lyssa of his Bacchantes, and Pan is its governor].

Lusus is usually translated as "game" or "play", while lyssa is a borrowing from the Greek λυσσα, "frenzy" or "rage", and sometimes Rage personified; for later poets, Lusus and Lyssa become flesh-and-blood companions (even children) of Bacchus. Luís de Camões' epic Os Lusíadas (1572), which portrays Lusus as the founder of Lusitania, extends these ideas, which have no connection with modern etymology.

In his work, Geography, the classical geographer Strabo (died ca. 24 AD) suggests a change had occurred in the use of the name "Lusitanian". He mentions a group who had once been called "Lusitanians" living north of the Douro river but were called in his day "Callacans".

== Lusitanians ==
Iberian Peninsula at about 300 BC.

The Lusitani established themselves in the region in the 6th century BC, but historians and archeologists are still undecided about their ethnogenesis. Some modern authors consider them to be an indigenous people who were Celticized culturally and possibly also through intermarriage.

The archeologist Scarlat Lambrino defended the position that the Lusitanians were a tribal group of Celtic origin related to the Lusones (a tribe that inhabited the east of Iberia). Some have claimed that both tribes came from the Swiss mountains. Others argue that the evidence points to the Lusitanians being a native Iberian tribe, resulting from intermarriage between different local tribes.

The first area colonized by the Lusitani was probably the Douro valley and the region of Beira Alta (present day Portugal); in Beira, they stayed until they defeated the Celtici and other tribes, then they expanded to cover a territory that reached Estremadura before the arrival of the Romans.

== War against Rome ==
And yet the country north of the Tagus, Lusitania, is the greatest of the Iberian nations, and is the nation against which the Romans waged war for the longest times

— Strabo

Roman conquest of Iberia

The Lusitani are mentioned for the first time in Livy who describes them as fighting for the Carthaginians in 218 BC; they are reported as fighting against Rome in 194 BC, sometimes allied with Celtiberian tribes.

In 179 BC, the praetor Lucius Postumius Albinus celebrated a triumph over the Lusitani, but in 155 BC, on the command of Punicus (Πουνίκου, perhaps a Carthaginian) first and Caesarus (Καίσαρος) after, the Lusitani reached Gibraltar. Here they were defeated by the praetor Lucius Mummius.

From 152 BC onwards, the Roman Republic had difficulties in recruiting soldiers for the wars in Hispania, deemed particularly brutal. In 150 BC, Servius Sulpicius Galba organised a false armistice. While the Lusitani celebrated this new alliance, he massacred them, selling the survivors as slaves; this caused a new rebellion led by Viriathus, who was after many attempts killed by traitors paid by the Romans in 139 BC, after having led a successful guerrilla campaign against Rome and their local allies. Two years after, in 137 BC Decimus Junius Brutus Callaicus led a successful campaign against the Lusitani, reaching as far north as the Minho river.

Romans scored other victories with proconsul Decimus Junius Brutus Callaicus and Gaius Marius (elected in 113 BC), but still the Lusitani resisted with a long guerilla war; they later joined Sertorius' (a renegade Roman General) troops (around 80 BC) and Julius Caesar conducted a successful campaign against them in 61-60 BC, but they were not finally defeated until the reign of Augustus (around 28–24 BC).

== Roman province ==
=== Territory ===
==== Under Augustus ====
With Lusitania (and Asturia and Gallaecia), Rome had completed the conquest of the Iberian Peninsula, which was then divided by Augustus (25–20 BC or 16–13 BC) into the eastern and northern Hispania Tarraconensis, the southwestern Hispania Baetica and the western Provincia Lusitana. Originally, Lusitania included the territories of Asturia and Gallaecia, but these were later ceded to the jurisdiction of the new Provincia Tarraconensis and the former remained as Provincia Lusitania et Vettones. Its northern border was along the Douro River, while on its eastern side its border passed through Salmantica (Salamanca) and Caesarobriga (Talavera de la Reina) to the Anas (Guadiana) river.

Between 28 and 24 BC Augustus' military campaigns pacified all Iberia under Roman rule, with the foundation of Roman cities like Asturica Augusta (Astorga) and Bracara Augusta (Braga) to the north, and to the south Emerita Augusta (Mérida) (settled with the emeriti of the Legio V Alaudae and Legio X Gemina legions).

==== Conventus Iuridicus ====
Between the time of Augustus and Claudius, the province was divided into three conventus iuridicus, territorial units presided by capital cities with a court of justice and joint Roman/indigenous people assemblies (conventus), that counseled the Governor:

- Conventus Emeritensis, with capital in Emerita Augusta (Mérida, Spain)
- Conventus Scalabitanus, with capital in Scalabis Iulia (Santarém, Portugal)
- Conventus Pacensis, with capital in Pax Iulia (Beja, Portugal)

The conventus ruled of a total of forty-six populis. Five were Roman colonies: Emerita Augusta (Mérida, Spain), Pax Iulia (Beja), Scalabis (Santarém), Norba Caesarina (Cáceres) and Metellinum (Medellín). Felicitas Iulia Olisipo (Lisbon, which was a Roman law municipality) and three other towns had the old Latin status: Ebora (Évora), Myrtilis Iulia (Mértola) and Salacia (Alcácer do Sal). The other thirty-seven were of stipendiarii class, among which Aeminium (Coimbra), Balsa (Tavira), or Mirobriga (Santiago do Cacém). Other cities include Ossonoba (Faro), Cetobriga (Setúbal), Collippo (Leiria) or Arabriga (Alenquer).

==== Under Diocletian ====
Under Diocletian, Lusitania kept its borders and was ruled by a praeses, later by a consularis.

==== Roman diocese ====
Finally, in 298 AD, Lusitania was united with the other provinces to form the Diocesis Hispaniarum ("Diocese of the Hispanias").

Lusitania province territory

Roman Iberia under Augustus: Tarraconensis, Baetica and Lusitana

Roman Iberia after Claudius: Conventus juridici (Emeritensis, Scalabitanus and Pacensis)

Roman Iberia under Diocletian: Lusitania found in the west

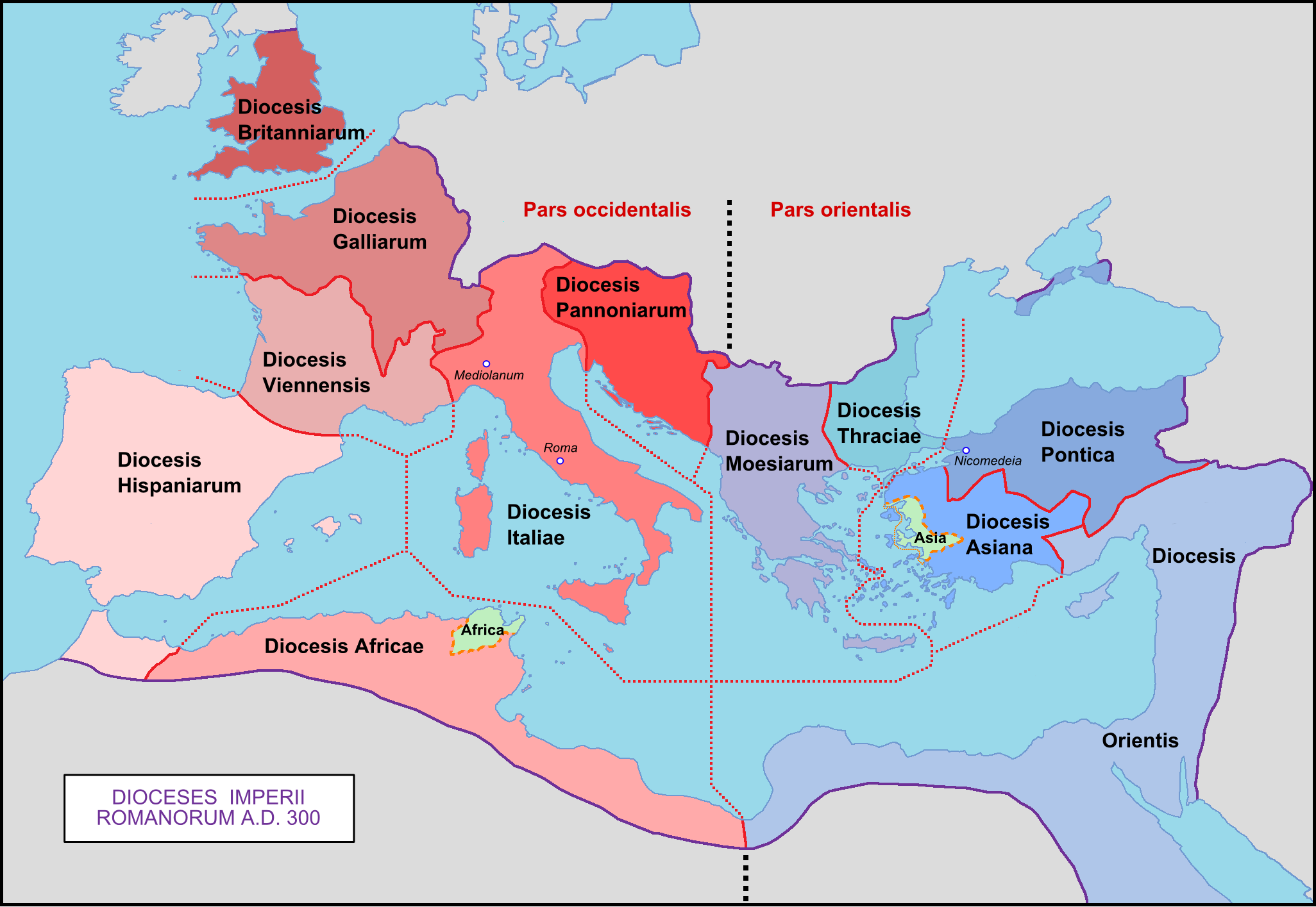
Roman Empire in 300 AD: Diocesis Hispaniarum in the west

=== Known governors ===
==== 1st century BC ====
- Quintus Acutius Faienanus, legatus Augusti pro praetore, 19 – 1 BC.
- Quintus Articuleius Regulus, 2 BC – AD 14.

==== 1st century ====
- Gaius Ummidius Durmius Quadratus, c. 37
- Lucius Caecilius Rufus, early 1st century
- Lucius Calventius Vetus Carminius, legatus Augusti pro praetore, 44 – 45
- [Marcus?] [Porcius?] Cato, c. 46
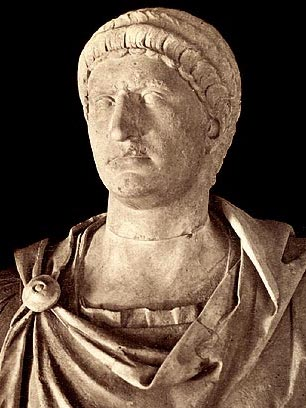
- Marcus Salvius Otho Caesar Augustus, governor of Lusitania between 58 and 68.
  Marcus Salvius Otho Caesar Augustus, 58 – 68
- Gaius Catellius Celer, 75/76 – 77/78
- Quintus Acutius Faienanus, 78 – 119

==== 2nd century ====
- ? Gaius Calpurnius Flaccus, 119/120 – 120/121
- Gaius Oppius Sabinus Julius Nepos Manius Vibius Sollemnis Severus, 128 – 130
- Lucius Roscius Maecius Celer Postumus Mamilianus Vergilius Staberianus, under Hadrian
- Gaius Javolenus Calvinus, 138 – 140
- [Aulus Avillius Urina]tius Quadratus, c.151 – c.154
- Sextus Tigidius Perennis, before 185
- ? Cornelius Repentinus, c.185 – c.188
- Publius Septimius Geta, c.188 – c.191
- Gaius Caesonius Macer Rufinianus, 193/194 – 197
- Gaius Junius Faustinus [Pl]a[cidus] Postumianus, c.197 – c.200

==== 3rd century ====
- Decimus Iun[ius? ...] Coelianus, c.201 – 209
- Sextus Furnius Julianus, c.211
- Rutilius Pudens Crispinus, c.225 – c.227
- Aemilius Aemilianus, late 3rd century
- Datianus, 286 – 293

==== 4th century ====
- Iulius Saturninus, c.337 – c. 340
- Vettius Agorius Praetextatus, 361– 362

=== Coloniae and Municipia ===
Map of Coloniae and Municipia
- Colonia Augusta Emerita (Mérida) - provincial capital, 38°55′N 6°20′W
- Colonia Metellinum (Medellín), 38°57′47″N 5°57′28″W
- Colonia Norba Caesarina (Cáceres), 39°29′N 6°22′W
- Colonia Civitas Pacensis (Beja), 38.0178°N 7.8653°W
- Colonia Scalabis Praesidium Iulium (Santarém), 39°14′02″N 08°41′10″W
- Municipium Caesarobriga (Talavera de la Reina), 39°57′30″N 4°49′58″W
- Municipium Augustobriga (Talavera la Vieja), 39°48′18″N 5°24′25″W
- Municipium Aeminium (Coimbra), 40°12′40″N 8°25′45″W
- Municipium Conímbriga (Condeixa-a-Nova), 40°5′58″N 8°29′26″W
- Municipium Salmantica (Salamanca), 40°57′54″N 05°39′51″W
- Municipium Caurium (Coria), 39.981944°N 6.537222°W
- Municipium Turgalium (Trujillo), 39°27′55″N 5°52′44″W
- Municipium Capara (Cáparra), 40.1666°N 6.1010°W
- Municipium Olisipo (Lisbon), 38°42′44″N 9°08′02″W
- Municipium Egitandiorum (Idanha-a-Velha), 39.997°N 7.144°W
- Municipium Regina Turdulorum (Casas de Reina), 38°12′8″N 5°58′11″W
- Municipium Lacobriga (Lagos), 37°6′10″N 8°40′22″W
Coloniae and Municipia image gallery

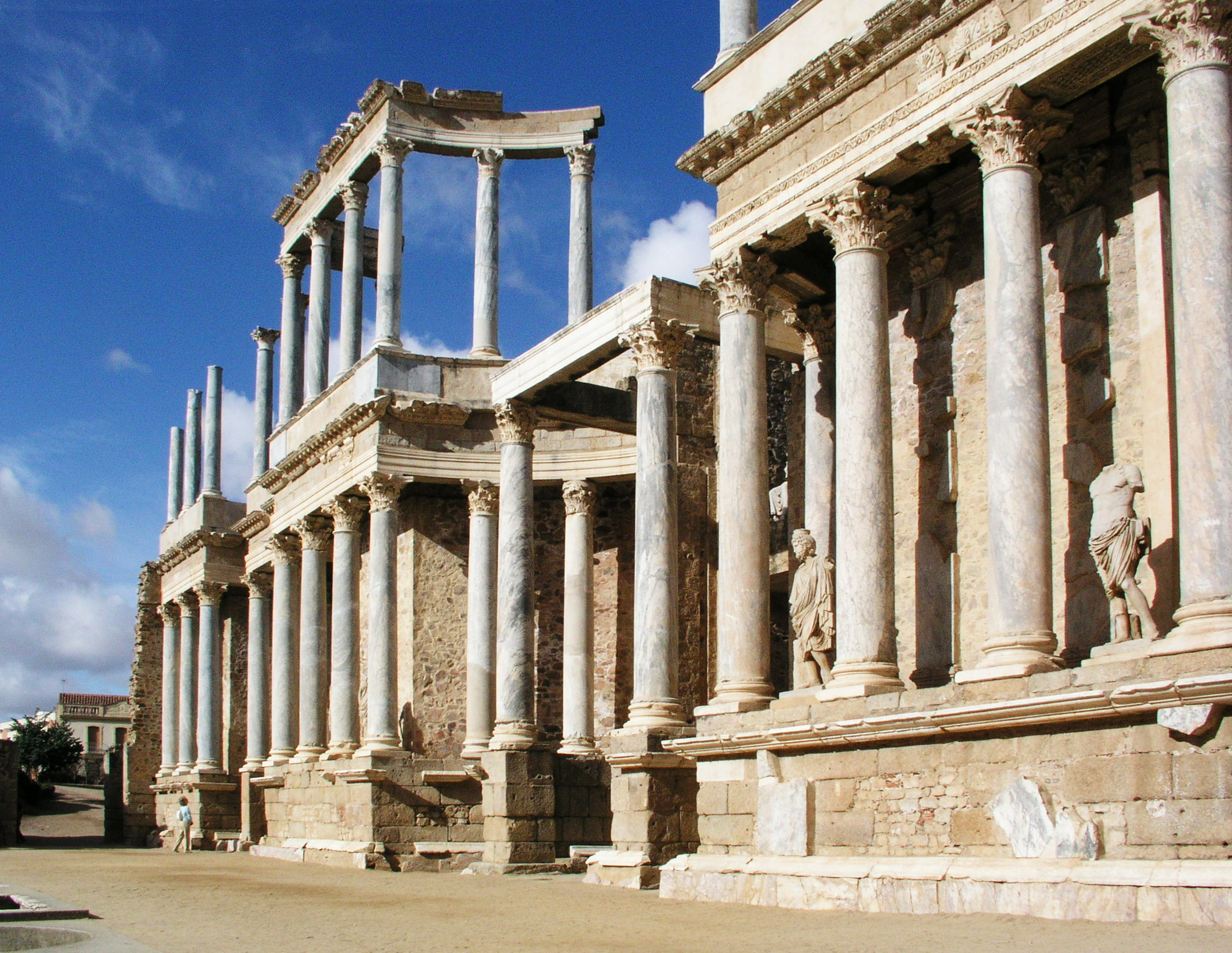
Roman Theatre of Augusta Emerita (Mérida)

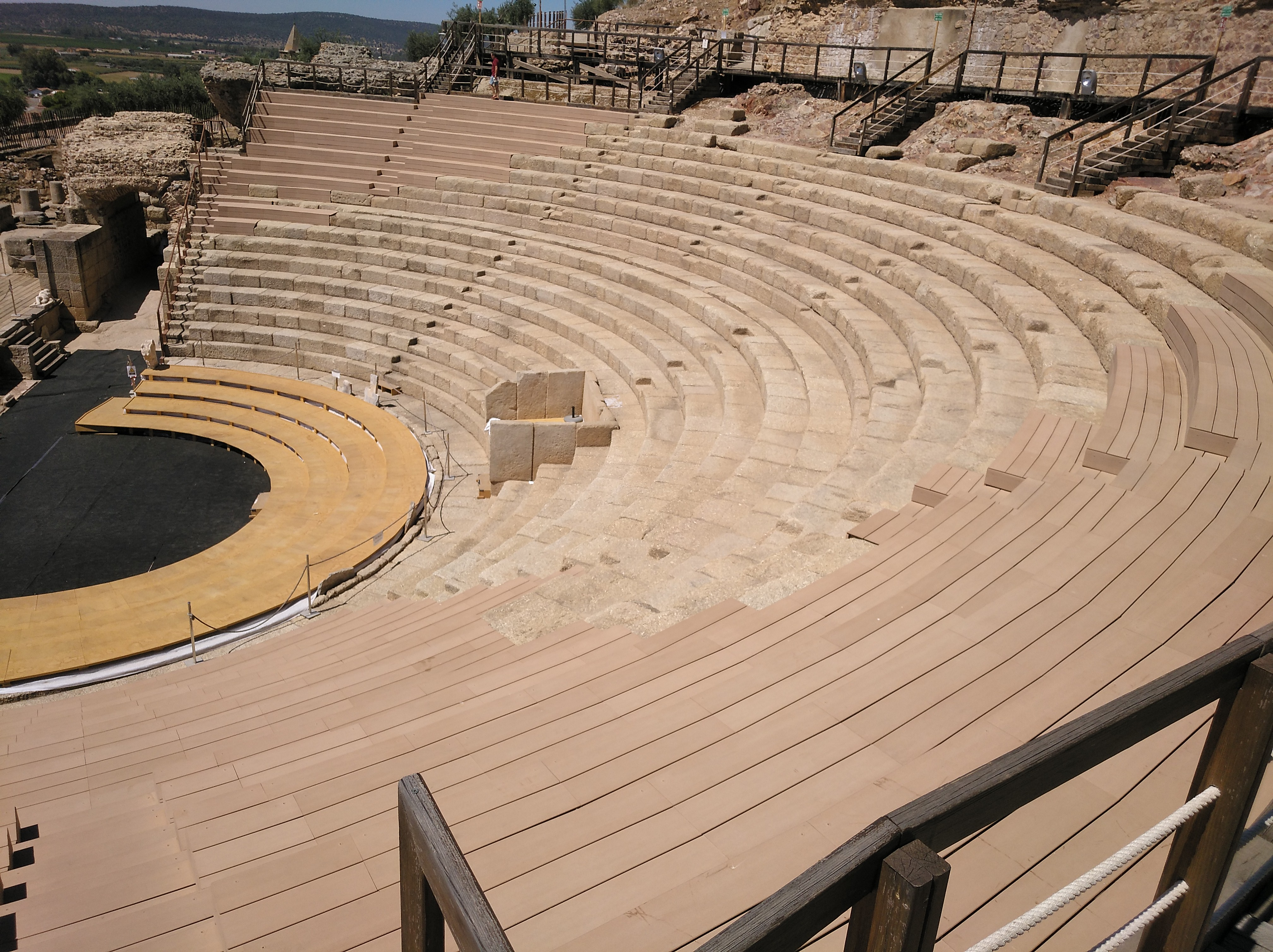
Roman Theatre of Metellinum (Medellín)

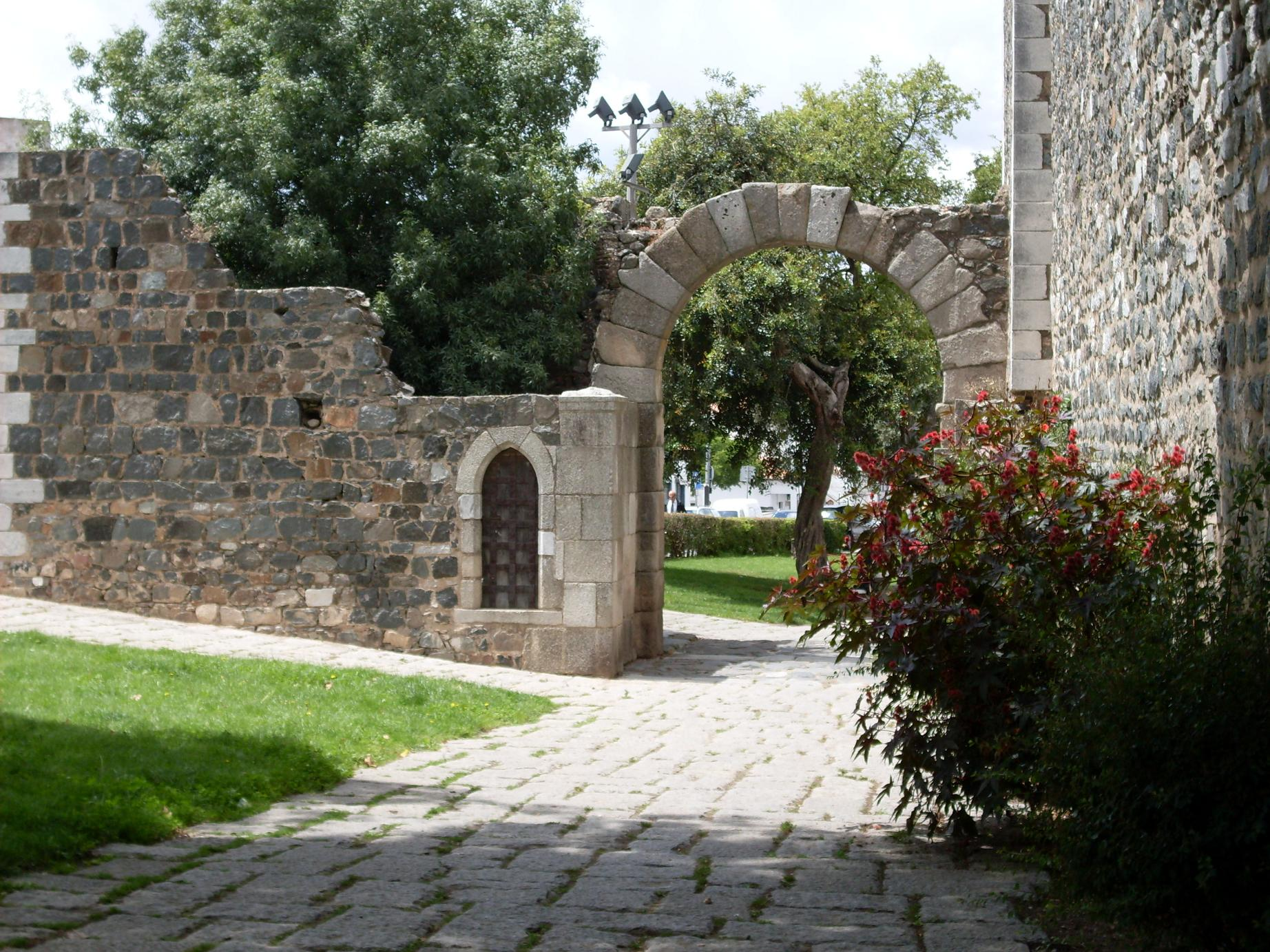
Roman arch of [[Pax Iulia|]]Pax Iulia (Beja)

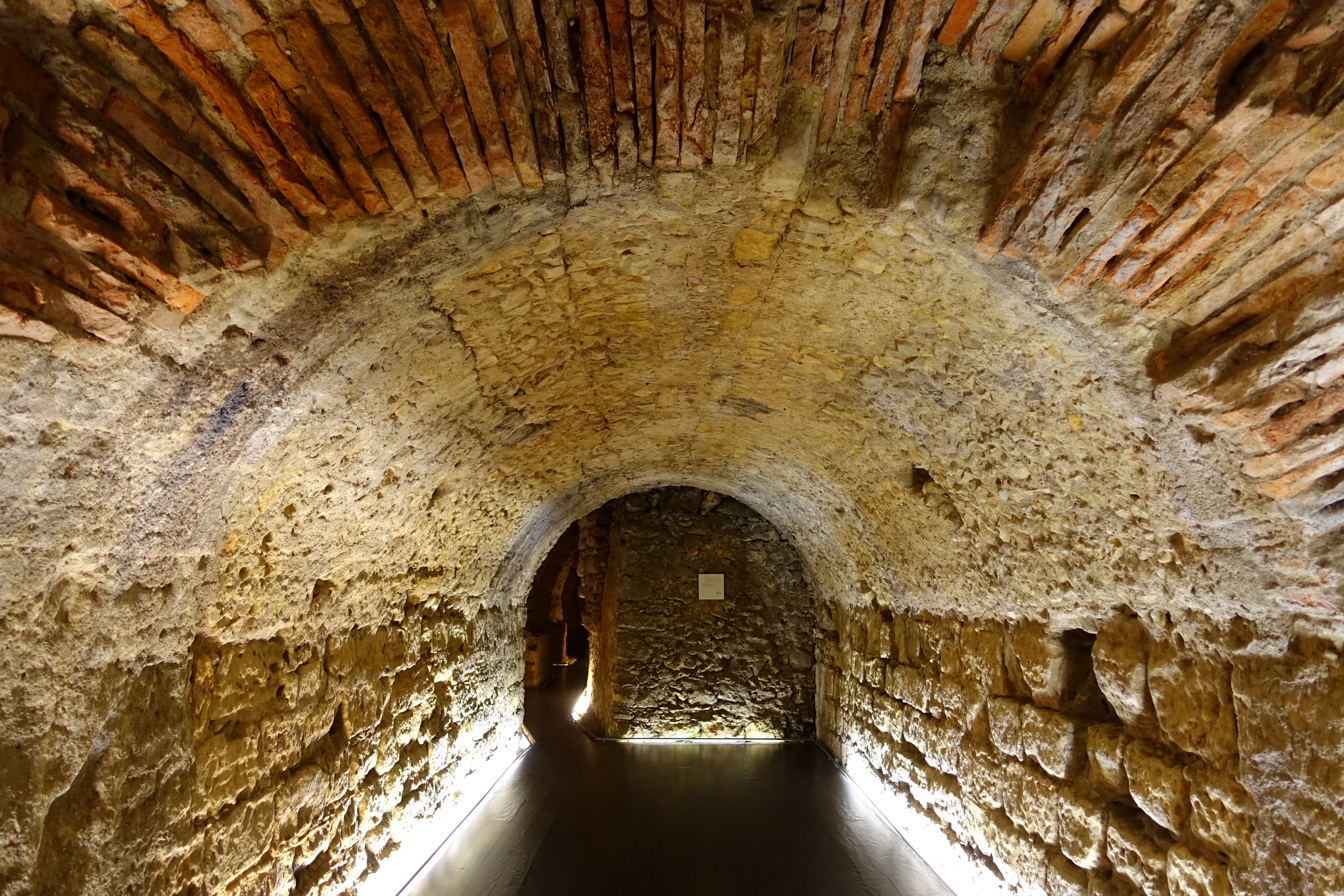
Cryptoporticus of the ancient forum of Aeminium (Coimbra)

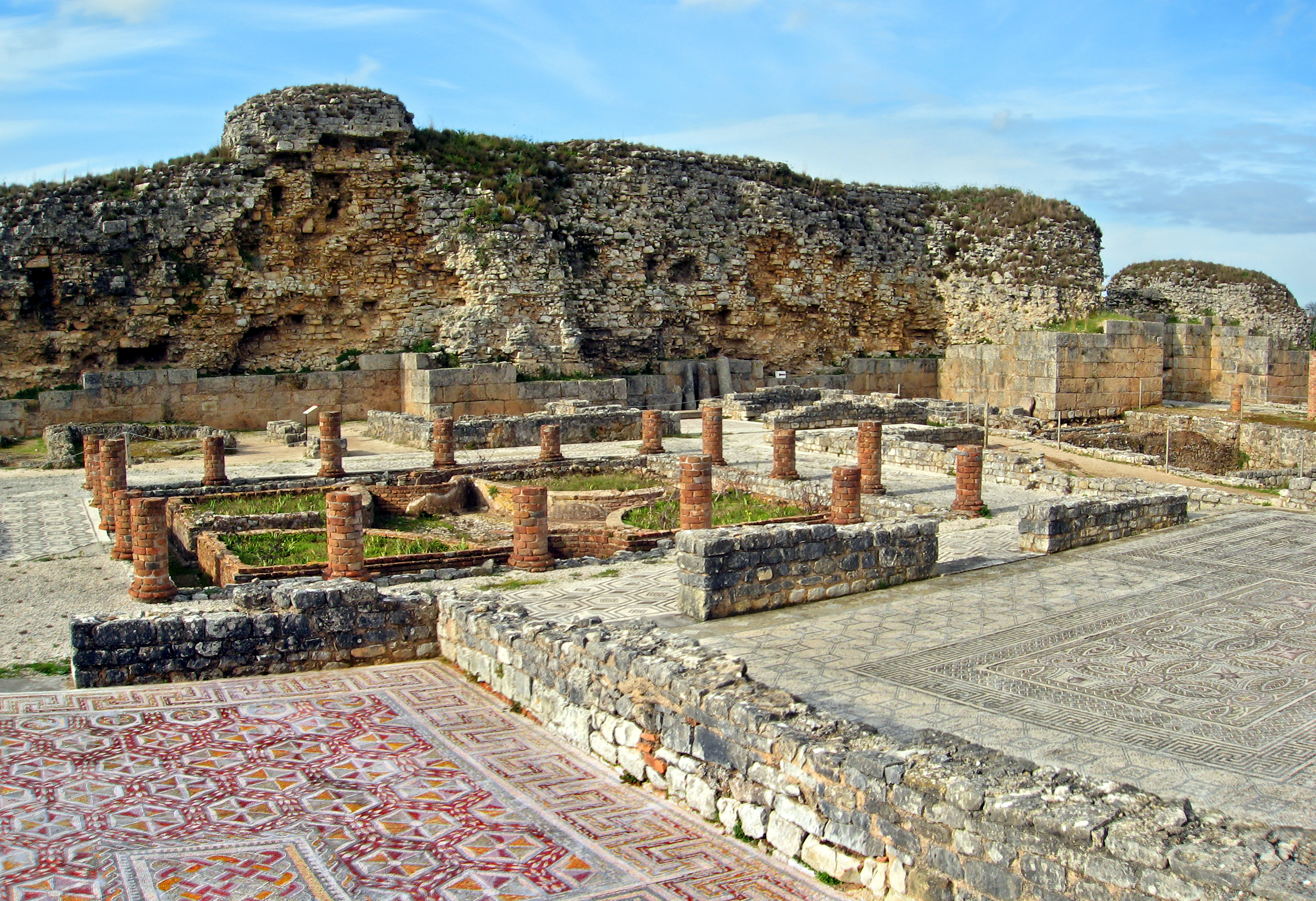
Ruins of Conimbriga

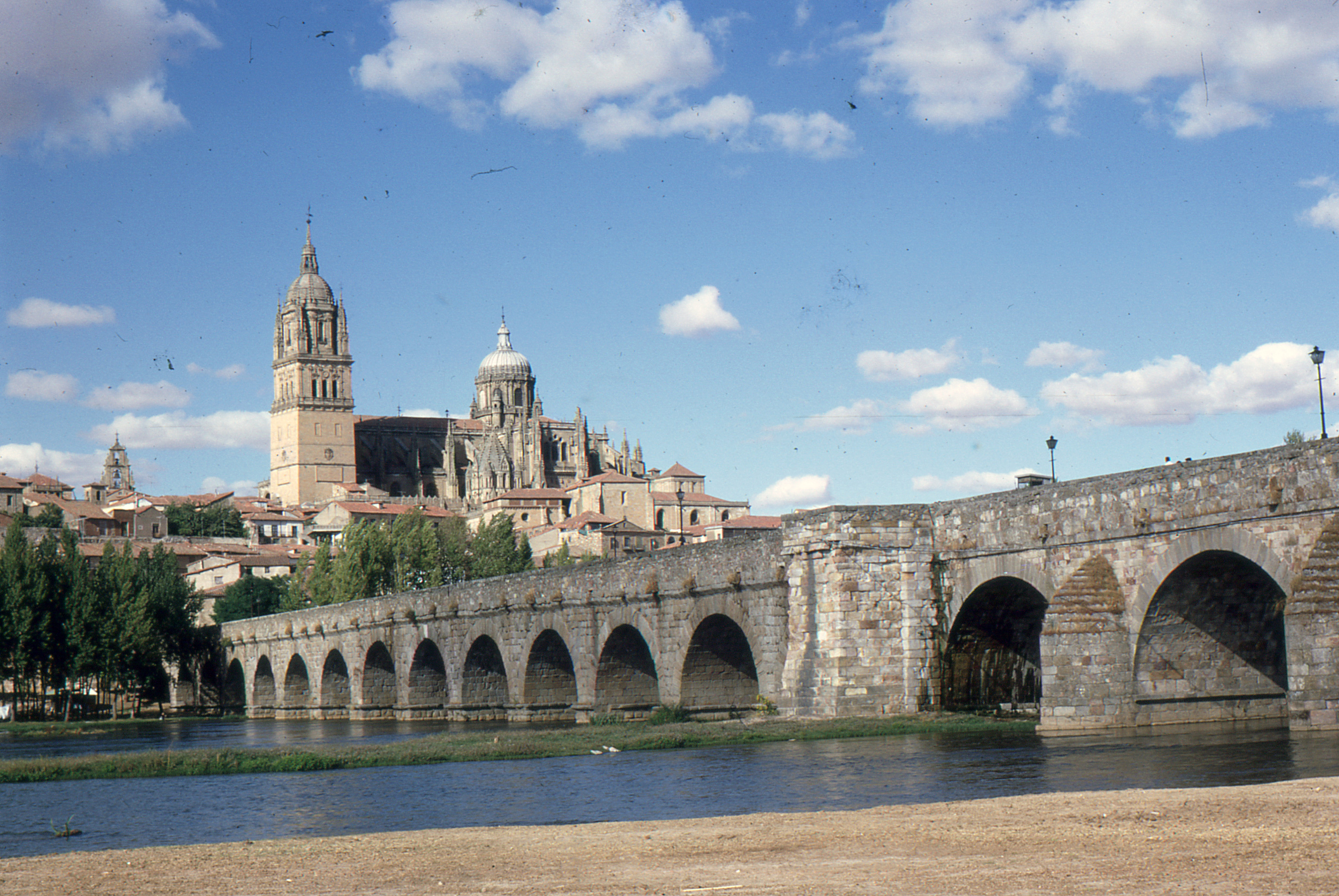
Roman bridge of Salmantica (Salamanca)

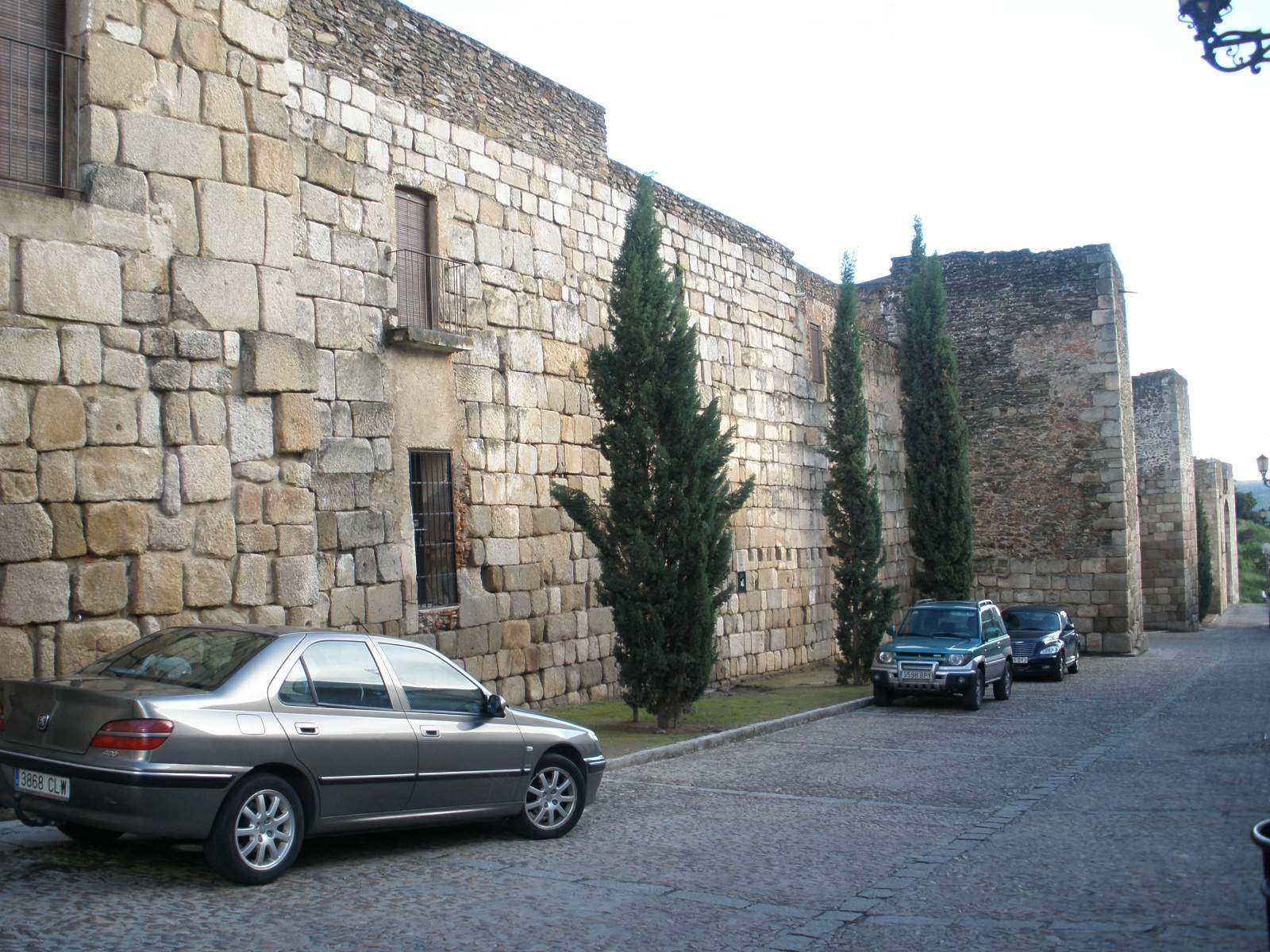
Roman walls of Caurium (Coria)

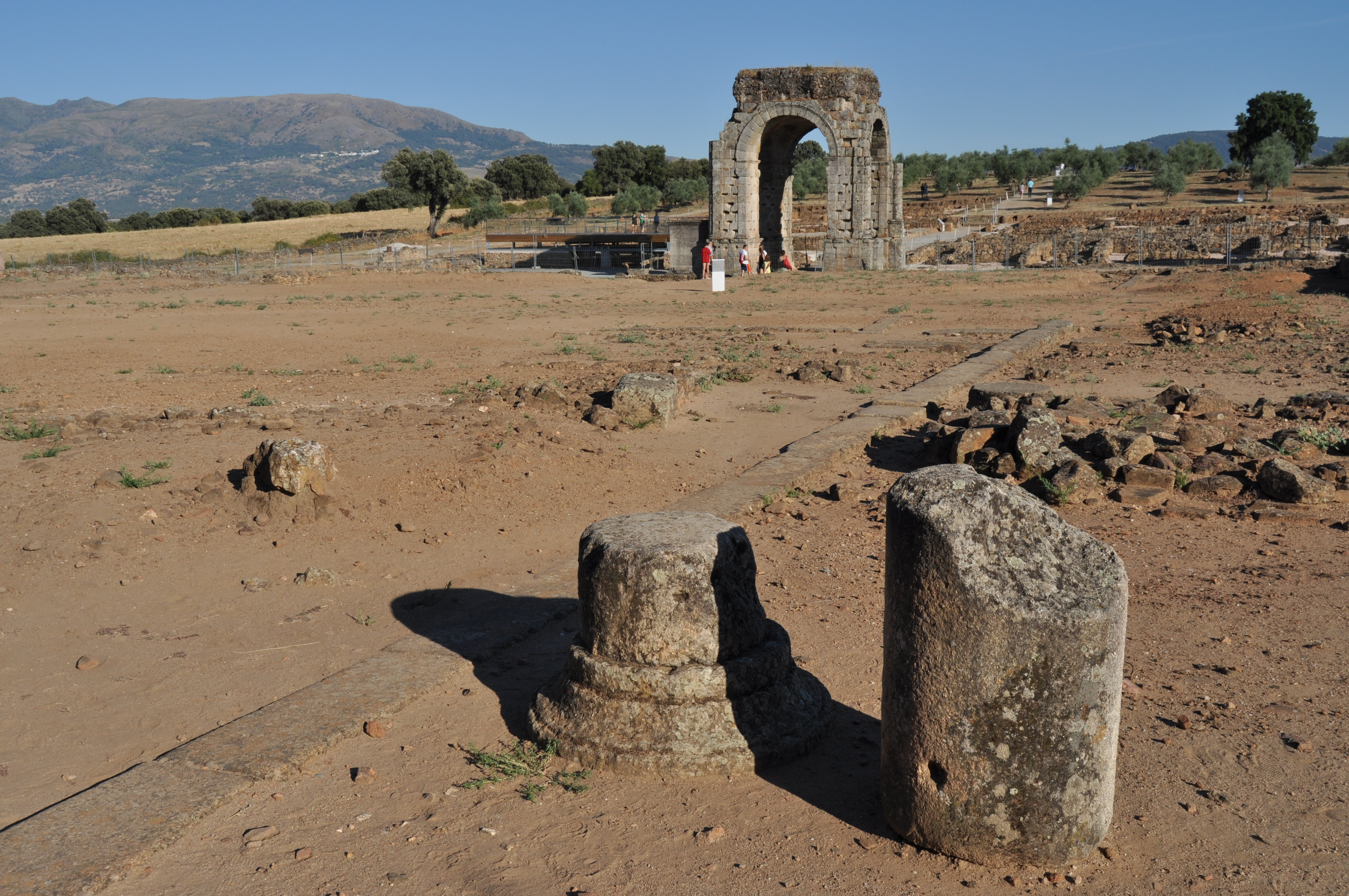
Forum gate of Capara (Cáparra)

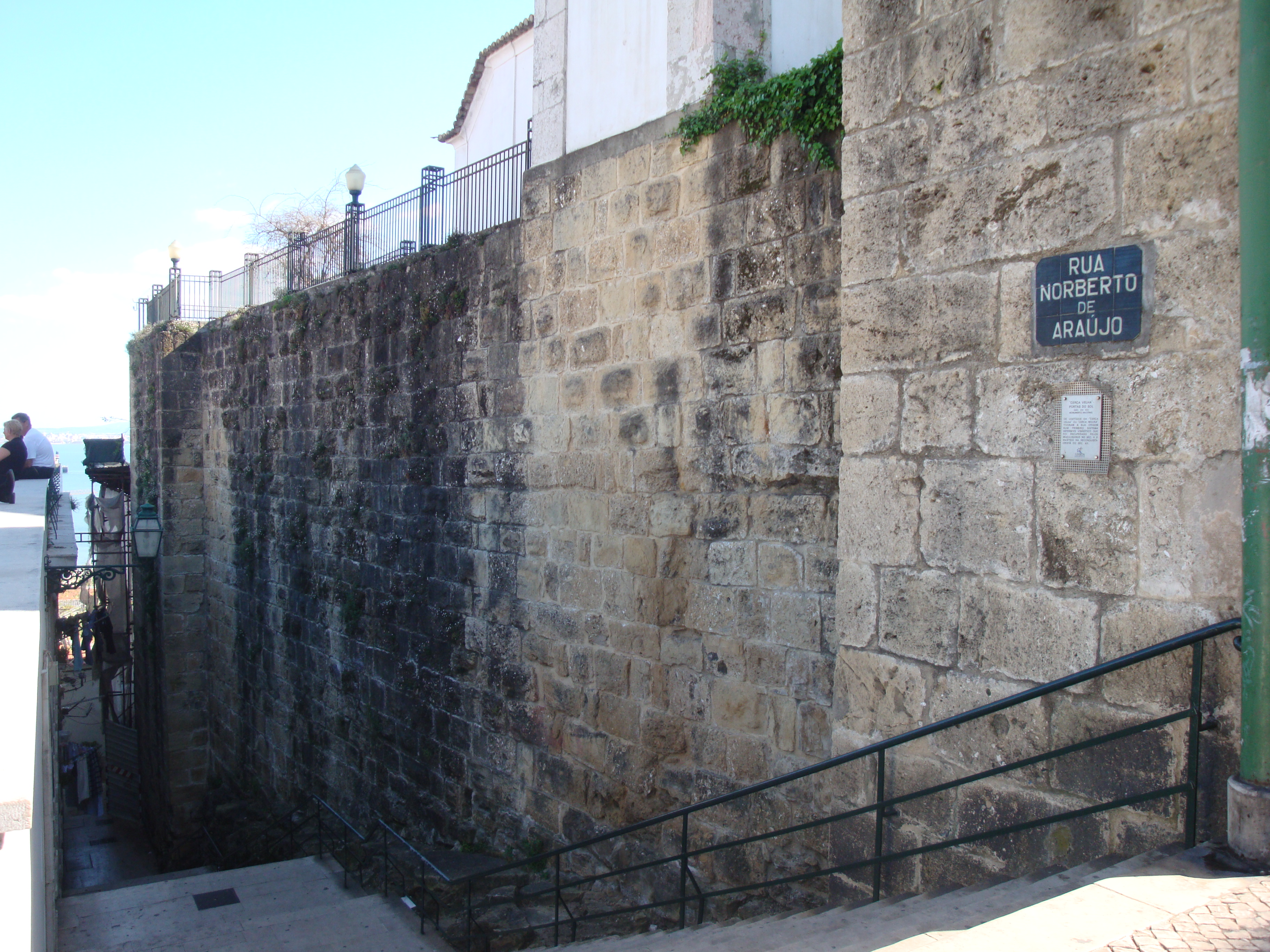
Roman walls of Olisipo (Lisbon)

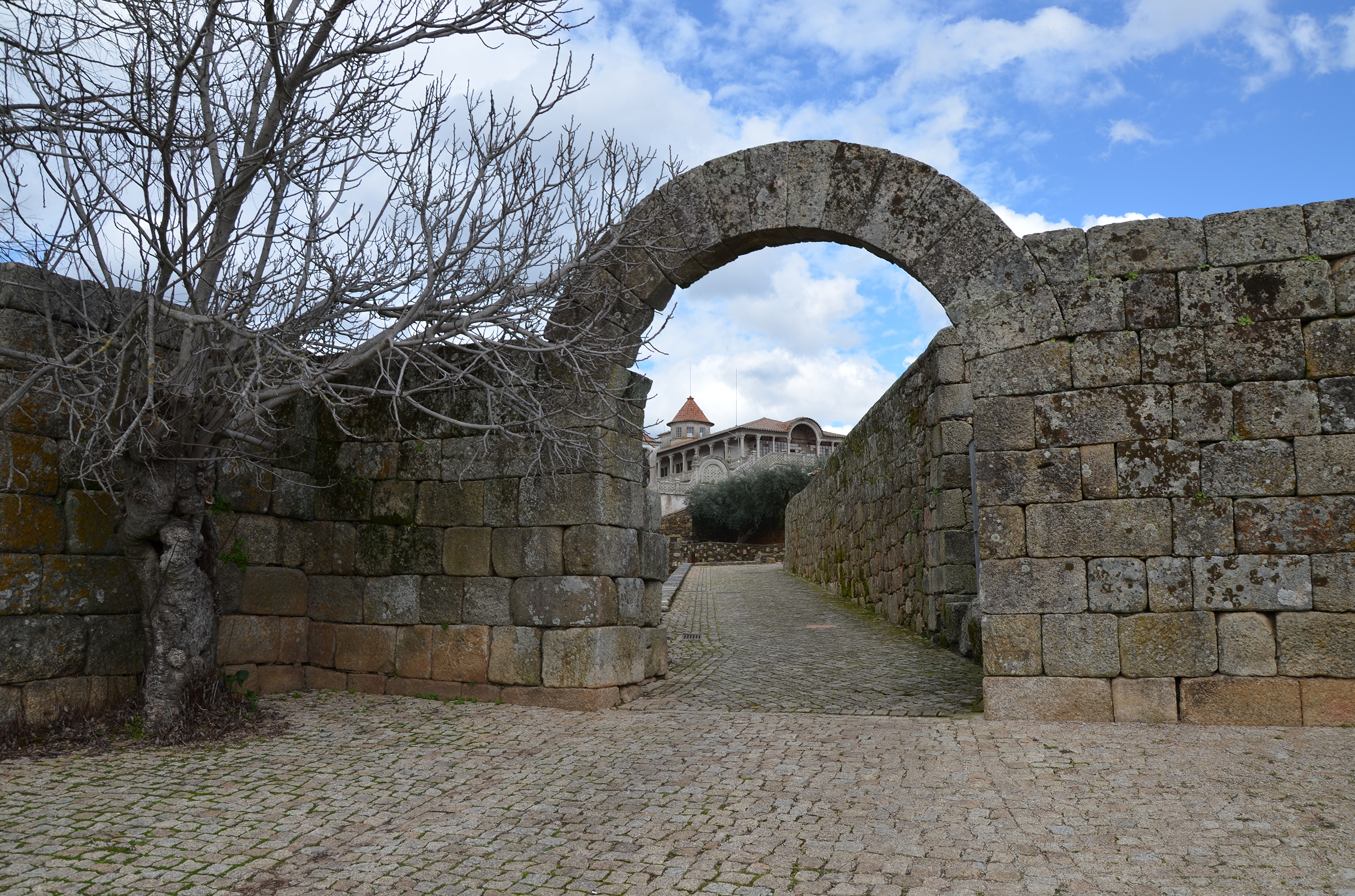
Roman arch of Egitandiorum (Idanha-a-Velha)

== Notable Lusitanians ==
- Viriathus
- Gaius Appuleius Diocles
- Pope Damasus I

== Legacy of the name ==
As with the Roman names of many European countries, Lusitania was and is often used as an alternative name for Portugal, especially in formal or literary and poetic contexts. The 16th-century colony that would eventually become Brazil was initially founded as "New Lusitania". In common use are such terms as Lusophone, meaning Portuguese-speaking, and Lusitanic, referring to the Community of Portuguese Language Countries—once Portugal's colonies and presently independent countries still sharing some common heritage. Prior to his invasion in 1807, Napoleon Bonaparte proposed the establishment of a French-backed puppet Kingdom of Northern Lusitania as one of the successor states to Portugal under the assumption that such a campaign would result in an easy French victory.

The province was also the namesake of the North Atlantic Ocean liner RMS Lusitania infamous for being torpedoed by a German U-boat in 1915. Cunard, the ship's owner, commonly named its vessels after Roman provinces with the Lusitania so being called after the Roman Iberian province to the north of the Strait of Gibraltar while her sister ship RMS Mauretania was named after the Roman North African province on the south side of the strait.

== See also ==
- Lusitanian mythology
- Lusitanian language
- National Archaeology Museum (Portugal)
- Ophiussa
- History of Portugal
- Timeline of Portuguese history
- History of Spain
- Timeline of Spanish history
- Pre-Roman peoples of the Iberian Peninsula
- Romanization of Iberia
- Balsa (Roman town)
