= List of Celtic place names in Galicia =

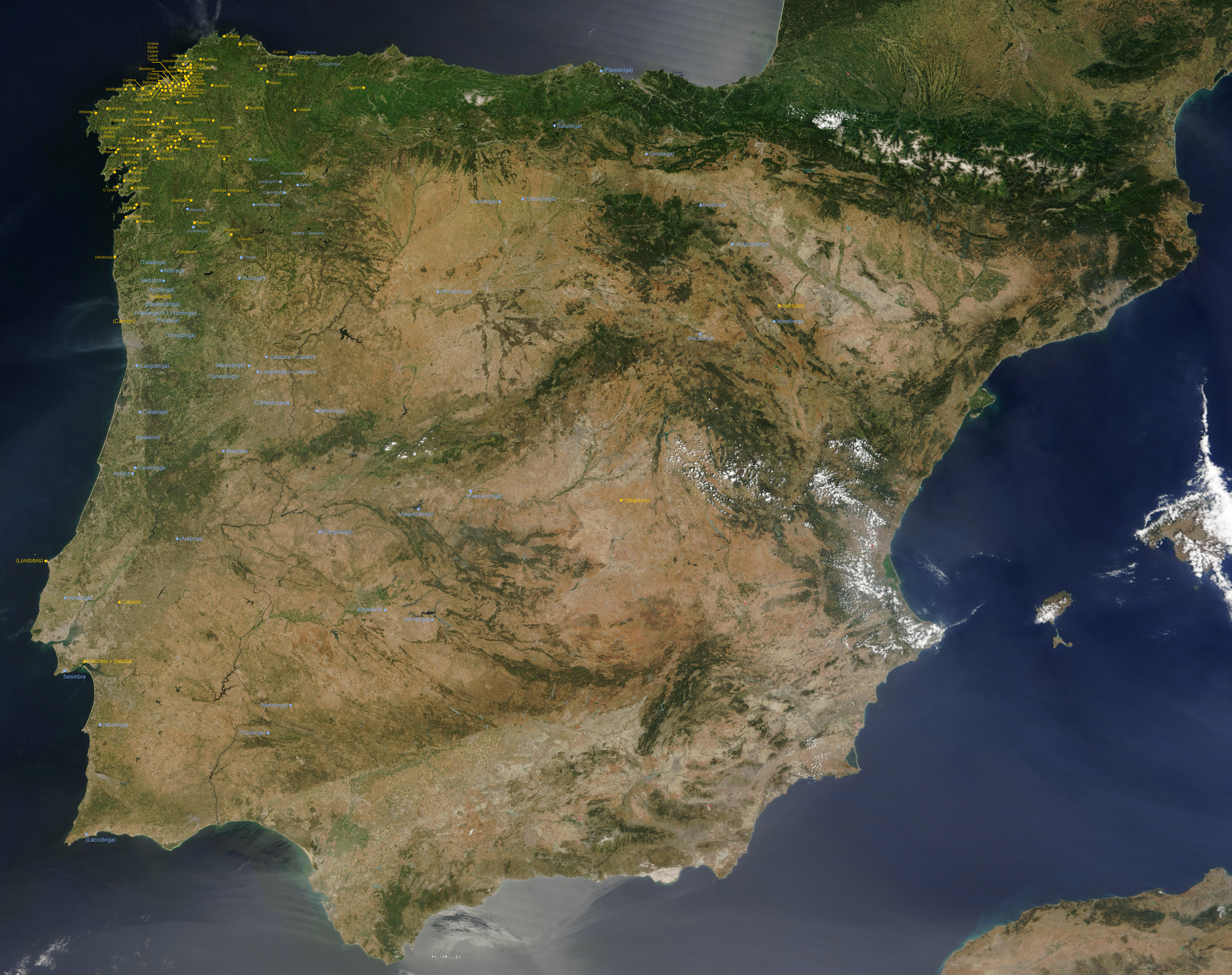
Ancient (bracketed) and modern places in the Iberian Peninsula which have names containing the Celtic elements -brigā or -bris < -brixs 'hill, hillfort'

The Celtic toponymy of Galicia is the whole of the ancient or modern place, river, or mountain names which were originated inside a Celtic language, and thus have Celtic etymology, and which are or were located inside the limits of modern Galicia.

== Ancient Celtic toponyms ==
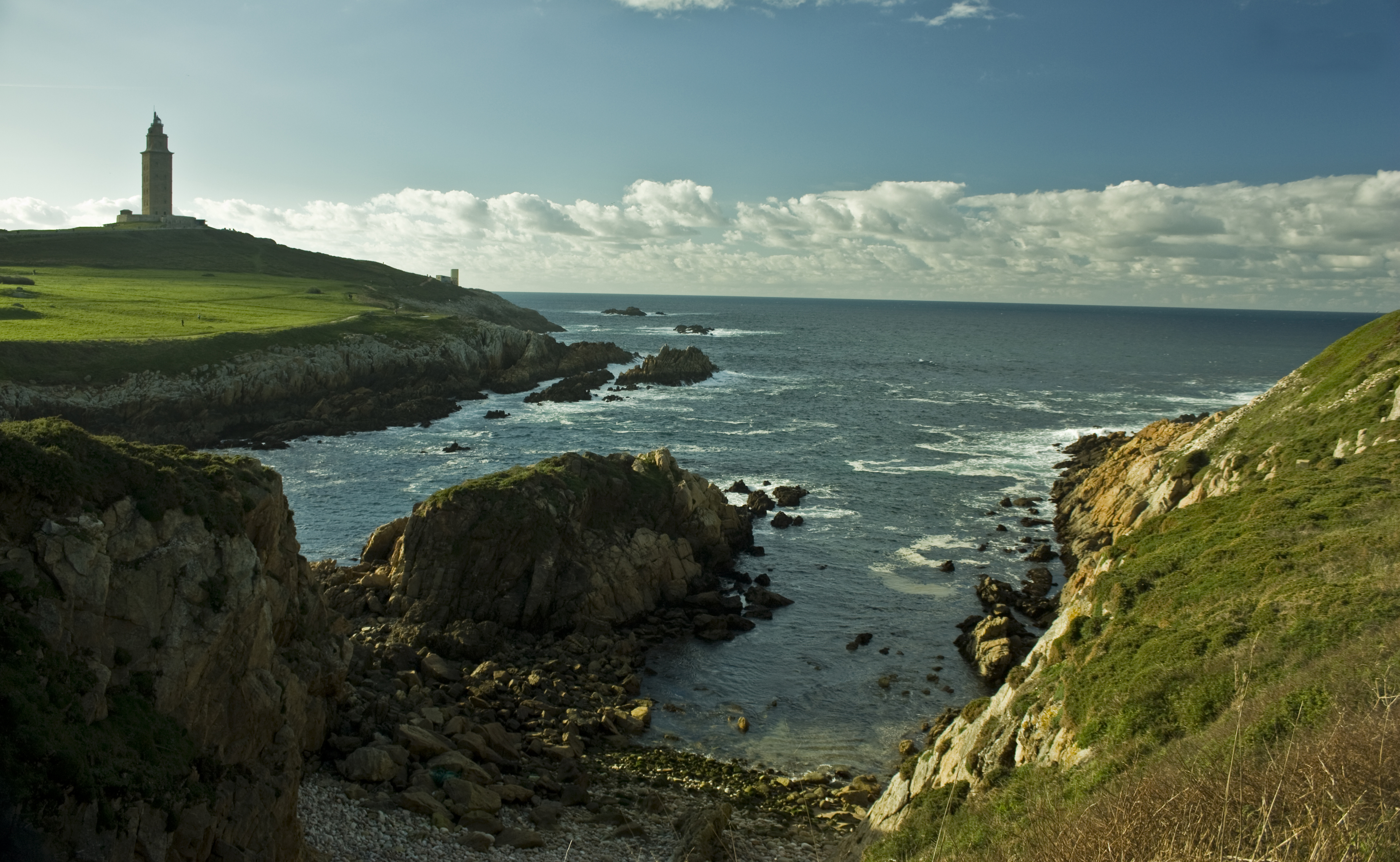
The Roman lighthouse known as 'Torre de Hércules', and in the past as 'Faro Bregancio', in A Coruña.

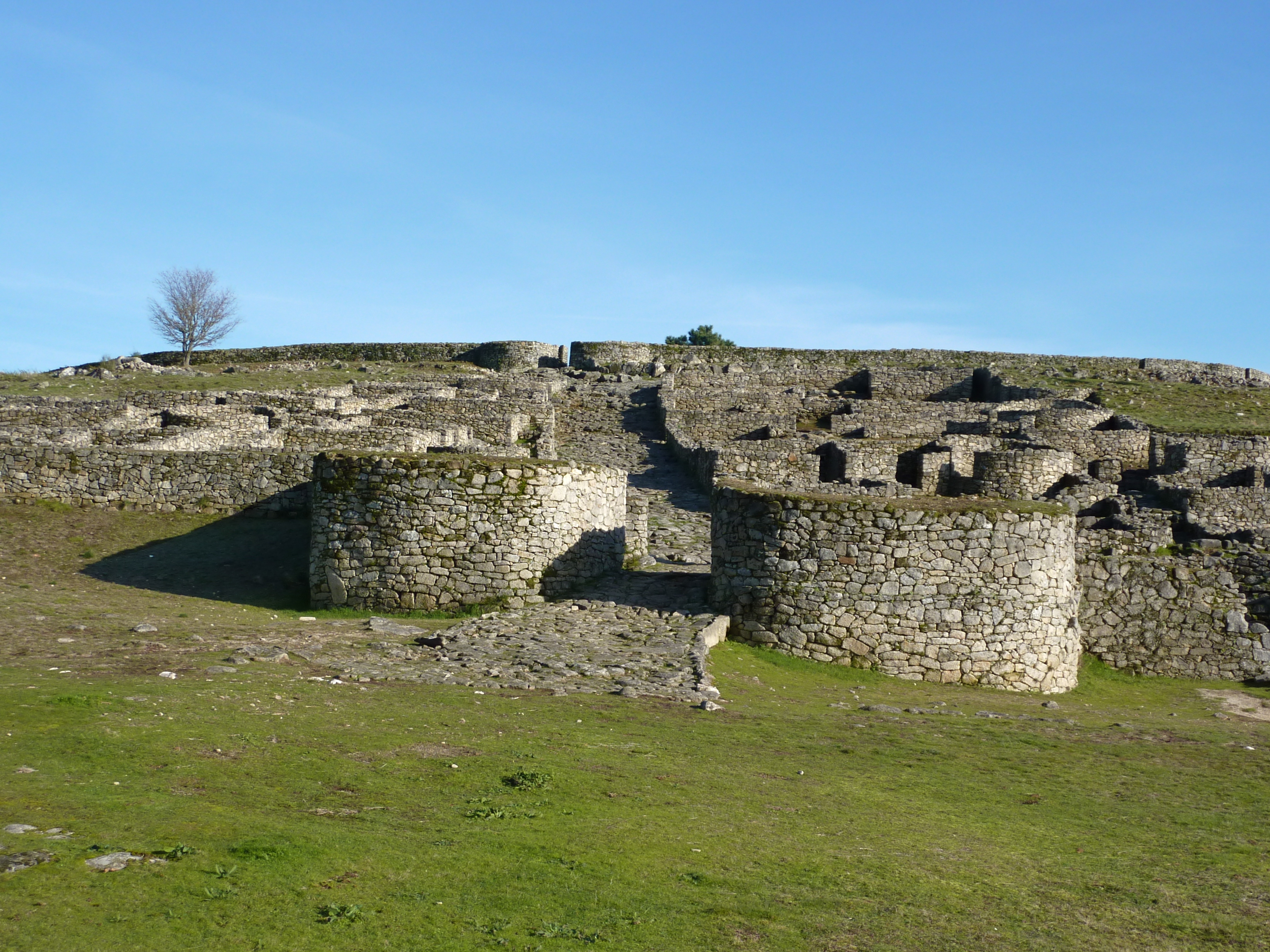
Doors to the 'castro' of San Cibrao de Lás, ancient Labiobriga or Lansbriga.

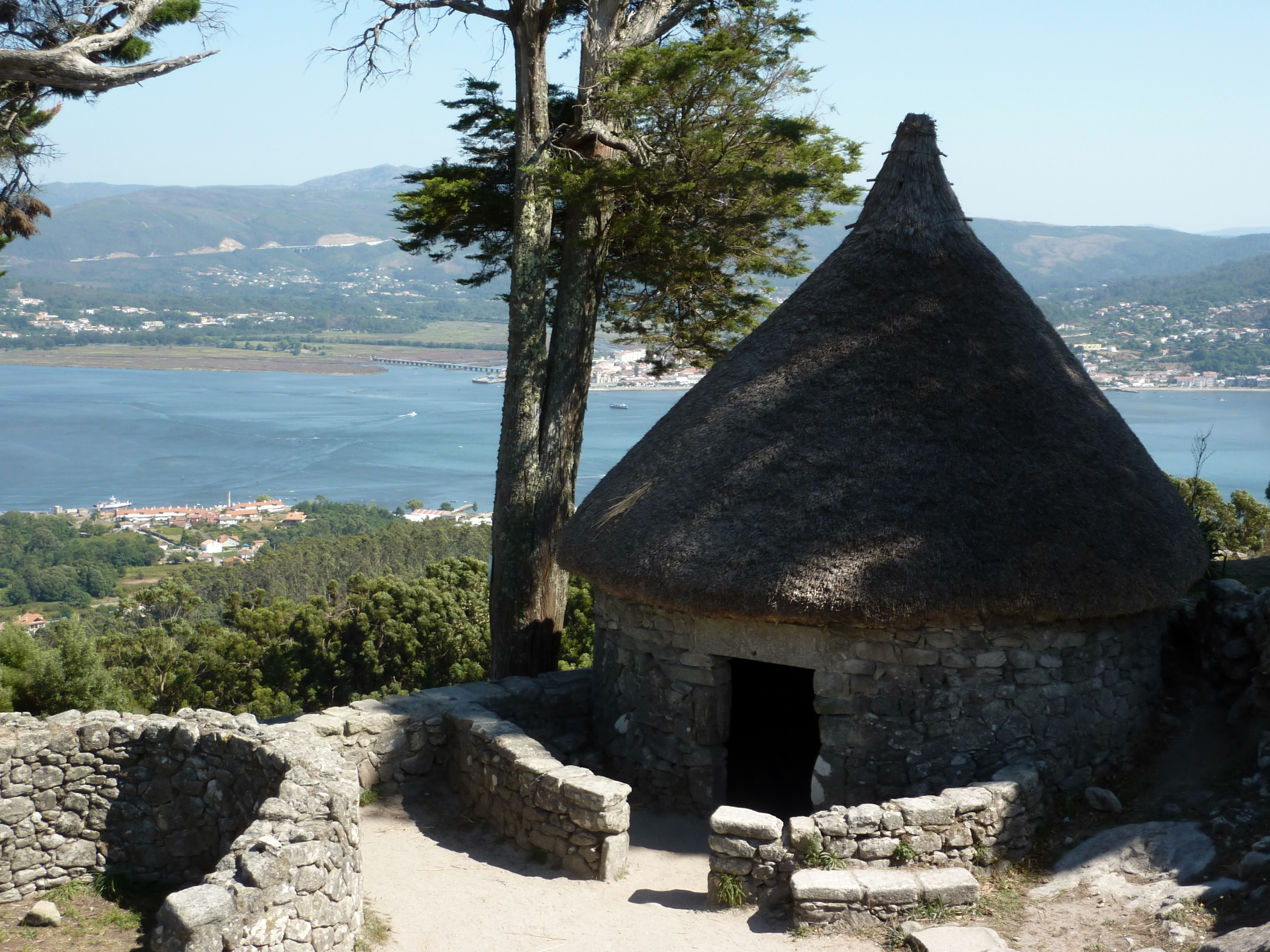
The Miño river as seen from the oppidum of Santa Tegra, A Guarda.

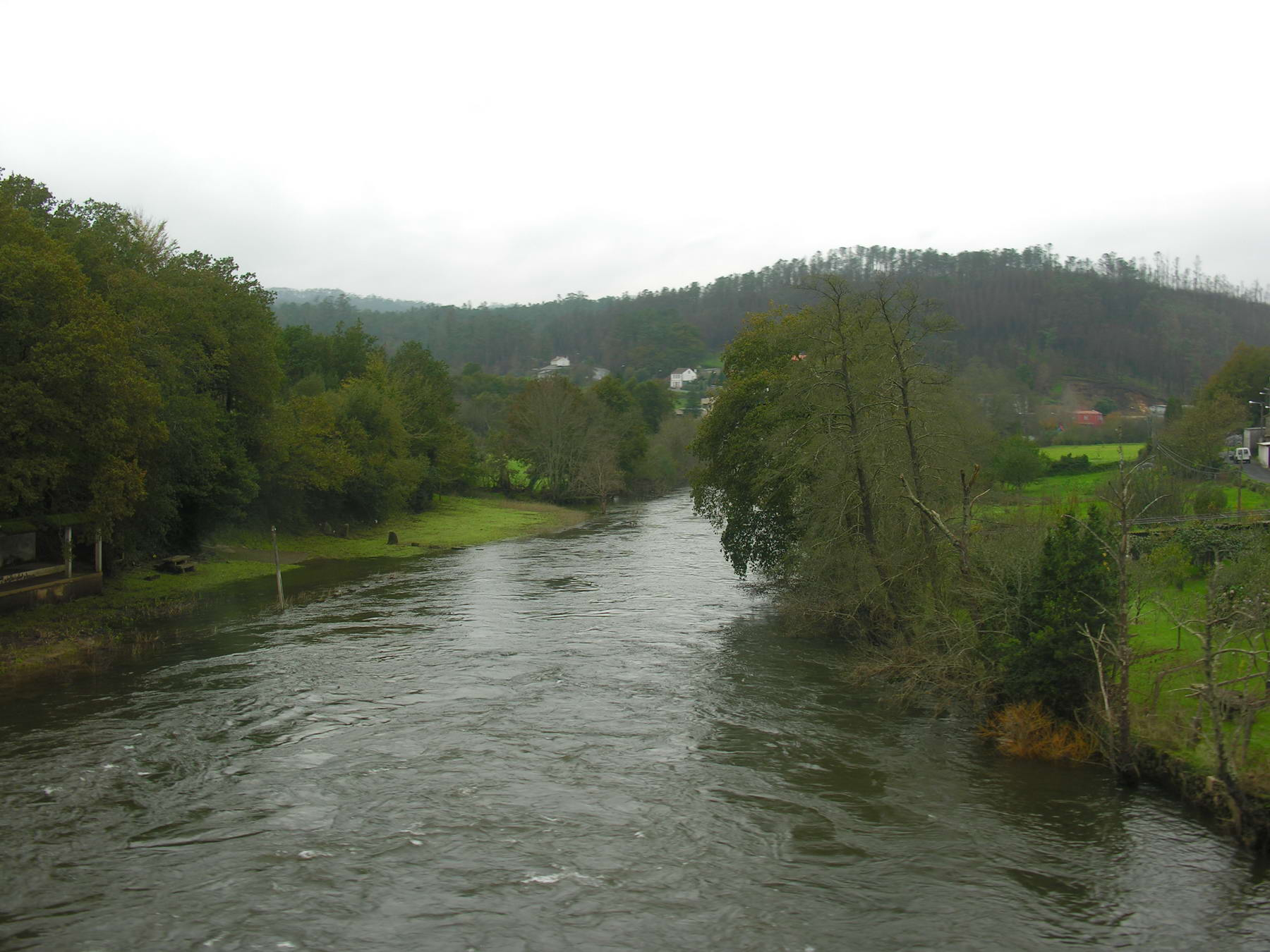
The Tambre river, ancient Tamaris.

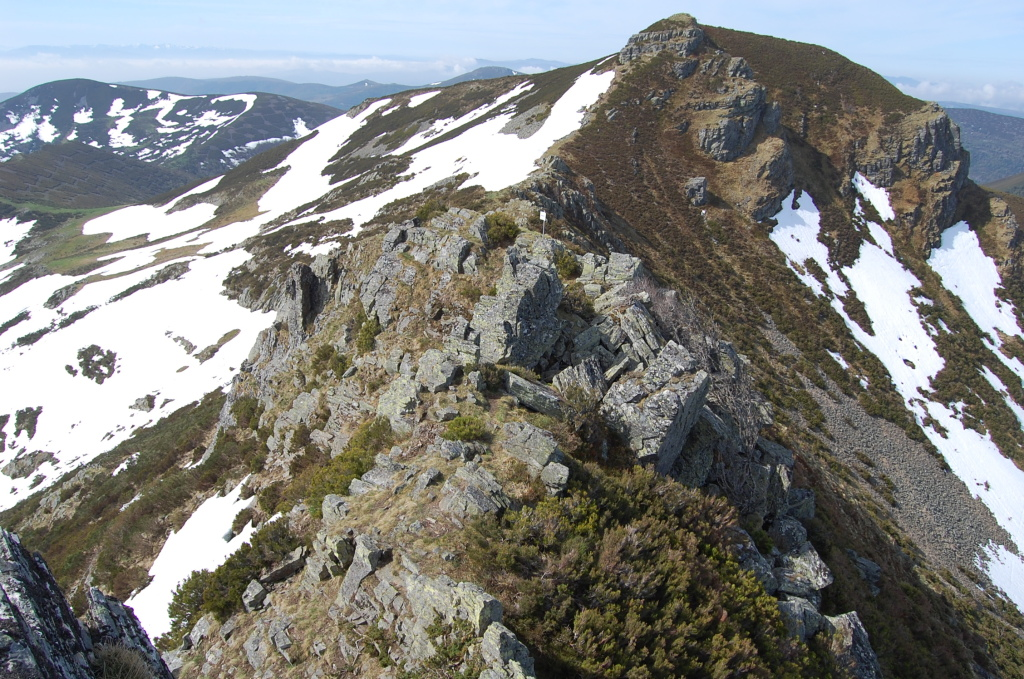
'Tres Bispos' peak, in Lugo province, in the westernmost extreme of the ancient Vindius mountains.

In Galicia, approximately half of the non Latin toponyms transmitted from antiquity in the works of classical geographers and authors (Pomponius Mela, Pliny the Elder, Ptolemy...), or in epigraphic Roman inscriptions, have been found to be Celtic, being the other half mostly Indo-European but either arguably non Celtic, or lacking a solid Celtic etymology. Here is a non exhaustive list of toponyms which have been found to be, probably, Celtic. The most characteristic element is *-bri(s), from Proto-Celtic *brigs, with its derivative *brigā, both meaning 'hill', and thence 'hillfort' and 'town'. The only type of settlement known in Galicia during the Iron Age are forts and fortified towns (castros) built in hills and peninsulas. Many of them were abandoned after the Roman conquest.

- Aediobri: From a votive inscription to the god BANDVE AEDIOBRICO. To *aydu- 'fire' or *(p)ētu- '(grass)land, territory', and *brixs 'hill(fort)'. Cf. Irish brí 'hill' and Welsh brig 'crest', and the people of the Aedui in Gaul.
- Asseconia or Assegonion: A town. Maybe to *Ad-sego- 'The very strong one'.
- Aviliobris: Castle (hillfort) in NW Galicia. To *Awelyobrixs 'Windy Hill'. Cf. Breton/Welsh awel 'wind'.
- Adrobricam urbem: City of the Artabri. To *brig- 'hill(fort)'.
- Alanobricae – Eiras in San Amaro
- Albiones: A people living in between the rivers Navia and Eo. To *albiyo- '(upper) world' or 'country'.
- Arrotrebae: A people living by the seashore, in NW Galicia. To *trebā 'settlement', and *aryo-, either 'free man' or a derivative of *(p)are- 'in front of'.
- Aunios: An island on the Atlantic Ocean, modern Ons. To Celtic *auni-, of unclear meaning and etymology. Hydatius mentions a local people called Aunonenses, confronted with the Suevi newcomers in the 5th century.
- Berisamo: A hillfort of the Cileni. Probably to the superlative *Bergisamo- 'The highest one'.
- Beriso: A hillfort of the Cabarci, probably to the comparative *Bergiso- 'The higher one'.
- Bonisana: A town. To *bonu- 'foundation, base, butt'. Cf. Old Iris bun 'foundation, base, estuary'.
- Brevis: A town. To *brīwā 'bridge'.
- Brigantia: Ancient city, most probably modern A Coruña (Faro Bregancio in 971 CE). From *brigant- 'relevant, powerful'. See also: Proto-Celtic *Briganti.
- Callaecia 'The land of the Callaeci', to *kallā- 'wood' with a local complex suffix -āik-. Later it became Gallicia, modern Galicia or Galiza.
- Calubriga: A hillfort. To *brigā 'hill(fort)', and a first element of unclear meaning.
- Cambetum: A town. To *kambo- 'crooked, twisted'.
- Canibri: A town. To *kani- 'good, nice' and *brigs 'hill(fort)'. Cf. Old Irish cain 'good, nice'.
- Celtici: Either a descriptive name applied by classical geographers to a group of peoples living in Western Galicia, or a Celtic endonym based on the *kelt- theme also present in a series of Hispano-Celtic names: CELTIATUS, CELTIATIS, ARCELTI, CONCELTI, CELTIUS.
- Cistonia: A town. To *kistā- 'woven basket', and eventually 'chariot'.
- Coelerni: A people living in southern Galicia. To *koyl- 'thin (naked, bold)'. Cf. Old Irish cóil 'meagre, lean'.
- Coeliobriga: An oppidum near Celanova, most probably the capital of the Coelerni. To *koyl- and *brigā.
- Copori: A people dwelling in central Galicia, from the confluence of the Sar and Ulla rivers in the west, until Lugo in the east. Their name is probably non-Celtic, but note the Pictish *copor- 'confluence', maybe to *kom-bero- 'confluence' (or 'bring together').
- Ebora: Harbour, by the mouth of the Tambre river. To *eburo- 'yew'.
- Ebronanto (Valerio of Bierzo, Ordo Cerimonialis, c. 650). A state near modern Rubiá. To *Eburo-nantu 'Yew-Valley'.
- Equasei: A people living in southern Galicia. To *ekʷo- 'horse'. Cf. Old Irish ech 'horse'.
- Ercoriobri: A hillfort of the Albiones. A composite with first element *(p)are-koro- 'blow, shot' (cf. Old Breton ercor 'blow, stroke'), or *Ēri-corio- 'army/tribe of the west', and *brixs 'hill / hillfort'.
- Gigurri: A people living in actual Valdeorras. From *Gigur-yo, maybe 'the gander (people)'. Cf. Old Irish gigrann 'gander'.
- Glandomirum: To *glendos- 'valley, shore'.
- Iria: modern Padrón. To *(p)īweryā- 'Fertile land'. Cognate to Éire and Ériu.
- Laniobriga: Probable ancient name of the hillfort of San Cibrao de Lás, San Amaro, although the lecture of the inscription which contains this toponym is disputed. To *(p)lānyobrigā 'Hillfort of the Plain'.
- Laniobre: Bishopric during the 7th century. To *(p)lānyobrixs.
- Lemavi: A people inhabiting the valley of Lemos. To *Lēmawoi ‘The Elm people’, to *lēmo- 'elm'.
- Limia: River, modern Galician: Limia or Portuguese: Lima, near to its sources it became a large lagoon or marshy area, today desiccated. From *līmā- 'flood'. Cf. Welsh llif idem.
- Lubri: Hillfort of the Celtici. The first element, *lū-, can be an evolution of *luw- 'to set free, escape', or of *low- 'to flow', among other possibilities. Maybe Lubri 'The Free Hillfort'.
- Medullium: Mountain by the Miño river, near the Ocean, where a very large number of opposing Gallaecians would have been besieged by the Romans, the former giving themselves death when the situation became desperate. To *med-o- 'judge', *med-yo- 'middle' or *medu- 'mead'. Cf. place-names Medulli, Medullis, Medulla, in Gaul.
- Minius: Largest river in Galicia, modern Galician: Miño or Portuguese: Minho. To *mīno- 'tender, soft', cf. Old Irish mín idem.
- Miobri: Hillfort of the Celtici. Probably to *Meyobrixs 'Minor Hill(fort)'. A dedication to COSO MEOBRIGO (*Meyobri-ko) may also refer to this castle, or to another one under the same name.
- Morodon: A town by the ocean. To *mor- 'sea' and *dūno- 'fort'. Cf. the British toponym Moridunum.
- Navia: River, still known under the same name today. To *nāwiā- 'boat (vase, bowl)'.
- Nemetobriga: Probably the capital of the Tiburi, in SE Galicia. To *nemeto- 'sanctuary' and *brigā 'hill(fort)'. See: Nemeton.
- Nerii: A Celtici tribe dwelling near or around today's Fisterra. To *nero- 'hero'.
- Novium: A town sometimes considered to be modern Noia. From *nowyo- 'new'.
- Ocelum: A town, near Lugo. To *ok-elo- 'promontory'.
- Olca: A castle by Rodeiro, in the highlands of middle Galicia. To *(p)olkā 'arable lands'.
- Olina: A town. To *olīnā- 'elbow, angle'.
- Ontonia: A town. From *φonth_{2}-on-yā '(the one of the) path'.
- Querquerni: A people living in southern Galicia. To Indo-European *perkʷos 'oak', with Celtic assimilation.
- Seurri: A people living in both banks of the middle curse of the Miño river. To *seg-ur-yo-, 'the powerful ones'.
- Talabriga: Castle of the Limici. To *talu- 'front, forehead, protuberance, shield' and *brigā 'hill(fort)'.
- Tamaris: River, modern Tambre. To *tamo- 'dark'.
- Trileukon: A promontory, modern Punta dos Aguillóns or Cabo Ortegal. To *trīs- 'three' or 'very', and *louko- 'bright, shining'.
- Verubri: Name of a castle, as deduced of a dedication to the god BANDUE VERUBRIGO (*Weru-bri-ko or *U(p)ero-bri-ko). To *weru- 'broad' or *u(p)er- 'superior', and *brixs 'hill(fort)'.
- Vindius: The Cantabrian Mountains, a mountain range, usually more than 2000 meters high, running from Galicia till Cantabria. To *windo- 'white', so 'The White (mountains)'.

== Britonia ==
In the 5th or 6th centuries a colony of Britons settled in northern Galicia, and their bishops-abbots attended several councils, first of the Suebic Kingdom of Galicia, and later of the Visigoths in Toledo, until the 8th century. A series of place-names have been attributed to them:

- A Bertonía: A hamlet in Sober.
- Bertoña: A village in A Capela. It was the centre of a region called Britonia up until the 11th century, comprising the modern municipalities of A Capela and Moeche. Several other places were called Britonia in the neighbourhood.
- Bretoña: A village in Barro.
- Bretoña: A parish and a town in A Pastoriza. It is usually considered the heir to the ancient capital of the Britons of Galicia.

There also existed a village called Bretonos near the city of Lugo, in the Middle Ages.

== Modern and medieval toponyms ==
While there are Celtic toponyms all over Galicia, most Celtic and pre-Latin toponyms can be found along the coastal areas, most notably in the Rías Altas region around A Coruña, and in the valley of the Ulla river.

=== Regions, Mountains and Islands ===
Some Galician regions - usually called 'comarcas' when spanning over several municipalities, or concellos (councils) otherwise - maintain names either directly inherited from pre-Roman tribal and sub-tribal names, or simply with pre-Roman origin:

- Arousa (Arauza, 899 CE): Island and municipality in Arousa bay, Pontevedra. Probably Celtic, to *(p)are-auso- 'cheek'.
- Bergantiños (Bregantinos, 924): Region, to *brigantīno- 'king', or to *brigantigno-, both etymons would have yielded the same result. Cf. Middle Welsh brenhin 'king'.
- Carnota (Carnota, 915 AD): Coastal council and ancient territory, it is presided by the Monte do Pindo, an anciently sacred granite mountain. It was also the name of a mountain near Doroña, Vilarmaior. To *karn- 'pile, heap', with a hypocoristic suffix.
- Céltigos (Celticos in 569): Region, to the local tribe of the Celtici (plural accusative Celticos), who inhabited the westernmost regions of Galicia. For the *kelt- element, see the article on the names of the Celts. With the same origin, and implying further migrations:

Céltigos, a village, in Sarria.
Céltigos, a parish, in Frades.
Céltigos, a parish, in Ortigueira.

- Cervantes: Mountainous country and municipality in eastern Galicia. To *kerbo- 'pointed, sharp'.
- Entíns (Gentines, 1110), a parish in Outes, anciently a much larger region: From *gentīnos 'prince; chief of a kinship', cognate with Gothic kindins 'governor'.
- Larouco (Latin Larauco): A 1400-metre-high mountain, in Baltar; also a municipality and a parish by the Sil river; there is also a village under the name Larouce, in O Carballiño. Probably from *(p)lārHw-ko-, a derivative of 'plain/field'. Cf. Old Irish lár 'ground, surface, middle'.
- Lemos (Lemabus, 841 CE): A large valley, south of Lugo. Its name is an evolution of the name of the Lemavi people, who inhabited these lands. To Celtic *lēmo- 'elm'.
- Nendos (Nemitos, 842): Region and ancient territory, to Celtic *nemeto- 'sacred place, sanctuary', and 'privileged person'.
- Tambo (Tanao, 911): Small island in Pontevedra bay, to Celtic *tanawos 'thin'. Cf. Breton tanaw, idem.

=== Rivers ===
Many Galician rivers preserve old Celtic and pre-Roman Indo-European names, most notably larger ones. Others have lost its pre-Latin name, but its old namewas recorded in Medieval scriptures:

- Ambía (Ambia, 949 CE): A tributary to the Arnoia. To Proto-Celtic *ambe- 'river'.
- Barbanza: A short mountain river in A Coruña province, to *b^{h}r̥u̯-n̥ti̯-ah_{2}‑ 'boiling > waterfall'.
- Chonia: Tributary of the Tambre River. To Proto-Celtic *klowni- 'meadow'.
- Deva (Deva, 961 CE): At least two Galician rivers are called Deva, both tributaries to the Minho: the first flows through the municipalities of Arbo and A Cañiza, the second through Pontedeva (literally 'Bridge-upon-Deva'). To Celtic *dēwā 'goddess'. There is also a small village called Deva in Cervantes, Lugo. Cf. also rivers Deva in Asturias and river Dee, Wales, ancient Dēva.
- Dubra (Dubria, 1110 CE), affluent of the Tambre River. From Proto-Celtic *dubrā- 'dark', which in several Celtic languages developed semantically into the substantive 'water'. The municipality of Val do Dubra ('Dubra's Valley') receives its name from this river. Compare with the Asturian Dobra, and the rivers Douvres in France and Dover in England.
- Landro:. River which flows through the town of Viveiro into the Bay of Biscay. To *(p)lān- '?River of the plane', or to *land- 'open land (valley)'.
- Limia: To Celtic *līmā- 'flood', so probably 'The river of the flooded area'. In the past it formed a large swampy area near its sources which was mostly desiccated during the 20th century.
- Mandeo (Mandeum, 803 CE): Probably to *mandus 'pony'.
- Mendo (Minuete, 964 CE): A river which flows thought Betanzos into the sea, together with the larger Mandeo. To *menwo- 'small, minute', 'Minor River'. Cf. Irish menb 'idem'.
- Miño or Minho: Largest river in Galicia, to *mīno- 'tender, soft'. Cf. Old Irish mín idem.
- Nanton, river, tributary of the Tambre, from Proto-Celtic *nanto- 'stream, valley'. Another different one, the Río das Gándaras also bore the same name in the past (Nantoni, 955 CE).
- Navia: Large river which marked the frontier of Galicia and Asturias during the first centuries of the common era. It flows thought a canyon for much of its course. To *nāwiā- 'boat (vase, bowl)'. Cf Spanish nava 'valley in between mountains'. Another river, a tributary of the Sil river born by the 1700 meters high mountains of Serra de Queixa, in the province of Ourense, is also named Navea.

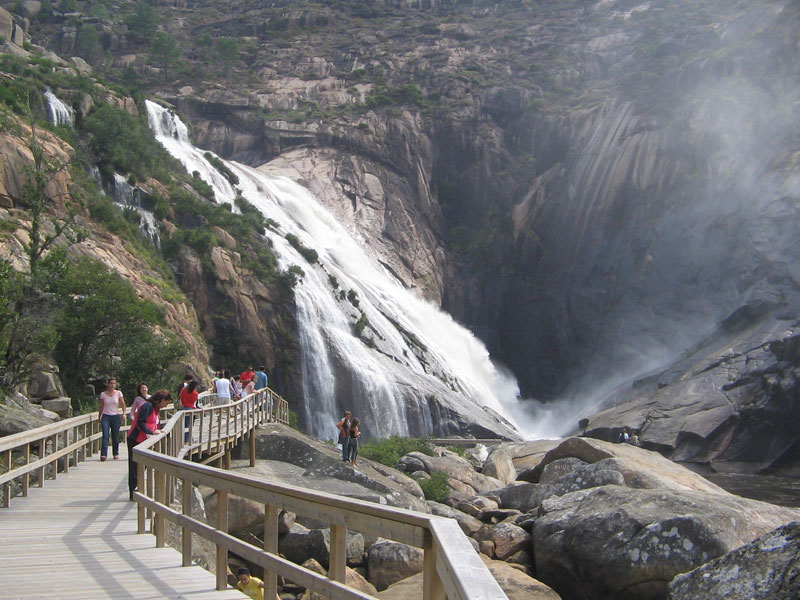
Waterfalls at the mouth of the Xallas river

- Samo: A tributary of the Tambre. To Celtic *sāmo- 'calm, easy, pleasant'. Cf. Middle Irish sám 'idem'.
- Tambre: Ancient Tamaris. To *tamo- 'dark', so 'Dark river'. Cf. the British rivers Tamar (ancient Tamarus), Thames (Tamesis) and Tamius. Another two Galician rivers bear closely related names (both to *Tam-ikā): Tâmega (Tamice, 982): Tributary of the Douro; and Támoga or Támboga (Tamega, 934 CE): Tributary of the Miño.
- Rio de Perros (Vernesga, 1078 CE), sub-tributary of the Miño: To *wernes-ikā, to *werno- 'alder, alder-tree'.
- Río Grande, a tributary of the Eo river, was attested as Alesantia in 775: To *Alisantiā as, for example, the rivers Elsenz, Auzance, Alrance in Germany and France. The old name is preserved in the name of a village As Anzas. Related: Esgos, a municipality in Ourense, from Alesgos (ancient names of the local river), from *Alisikos.
- Río Xallas, 60 km long river which flows into the Atlantic Ocean at Ézaro, attested as Esar during the Middle Ages: To *isar-, as the rivers Isère in France, River Aire in England, Isar in Germany, Ésera in NE Spain.

=== Parishes and Villages ===
Most of the 3794 parishes, small rural districts, of Galicia continue medieval and Roman villas, frequently founded near, or even on top, of old Iron Age hillforts. Many of these parishes preserve old pre-Latin names.

==== Composites containing Celtic *-brig- 'hill' ====
The most frequent element among the Celtic toponyms of Galicia is *brigs, meaning 'hill, high place', and by extension 'hillfort'. Usually it is the second element in composite toponyms ending in -bre, -be or -ve, being cognate of Irish Gaelic brí 'hill', with the same origin: Proto-Celtic *-brigs > -brixs > -bris. A few toponyms ending in -bra proceed from a derivative -brigā 'hill(fort)', which also originated Breton and Welsh languages bre 'hill'. Some of these toponyms are:

- Bérgoa: village in Ponteareas, and Bregua, village in Culleredo. From Bergula, to Proto-Celtic *berg- 'hill'.
- Bergaña: village in Valdoviño. To Proto-Celtic *brig- 'hill'.
- Bergaza, Bergazo: several villages in Quiroga, Coles, O Corgo, and a hill in Xove. To Proto-Celtic *brig- 'hill'.
- Berganzos: place in Xove. To Proto-Celtic *brig- 'hill'.
- Brión: several villages in Boiro, Rianxo, Malpica de Bergantiños and Outes, a parish in Ferrol, and several other places and hills all along Galicia, including a municipality. To Proto-Celtic *brig- 'hill'.
- Briallo: A pair of villages, in Cesuras and Ponteceso. Also the plural Briallos, a parish in Portas and a village in Pantón. To *brig- 'hill', with a pre-Latin suffix -alyo-, or a Latin one -aculo-.
- Alcabre: A parish in Vigo. To *Alko-bris 'Elk-Hill'.
- Alcobre (Arcobre in 991): A village in Vila de Cruces. To *Arcobris. First element can be related to Indo-European *areq- 'to protect, to enclose' (Latin arx 'fort, stronghold').
- Alxibre: A village in Riotorto, probably to *Alisibris 'Alder-Hill'.
- Anzobre (Anazobre, 971 CE; Anezovre, 966 CE): A village in Arteixo. To *Antyobris, with a first element of unclear meaning, probably to *anto- 'limit, border', or to *anatia- 'soul'.
- Añobre (Arnobre in 1122): A parish in Vila de Cruces. First element could be a primitive hydronym *Arno (cf. river Arno, in Italy).
- Añobres: A village in Muxía. Probably to *ānniyobris 'Ring-hill' (Cf. Old Irish ainne 'ring'), or to *(p)anyobrixs 'Hill(fort) by the water'.
- Baiobre: A village in Arzúa. Probably to *Badyobris 'Yellow-hill'.
- Bañobre: Two villages in Guitiriz and Miño. First element could be *wāgno- 'Depression, slope, meadow, marsh'.
- Barallobre: Two villages in Betanzos and Friol, and a parish in Fene (Baraliobre in 1110). First element is the same with the Galician substantive baralla 'confrontation, debate, judgement, speech', of unknown origin.
- Bedrobe (Bredovre, 1385 CE): A village in Tordoia. First element could be *brito- 'judgement'.
- Biobra (Viobra, 1252 CE): A parish in Rubiá. To *Widubrigā 'Forest/Wood-hillfort'.
- Callobre: Two parishes in Miño (it was Caliovre in 1114) and A Estrada, and two villages in Oza dos Ríos (it was Caliobre in 887) and Ortigueira. First element could be *kallī- 'forest' or *kalyo- 'hard'.
- Canzobre (Caranzobre, 1399 CE): A village in Arteixo, to *Carantyobris. First element can be *karant- 'beloved, friend'.
- Castrove (alpe Castovre in 1025): A hill near Pontevedra. The first element is difficult, but cf. Gaulish personal name Casticus, and Latin castrum 'castle'.
- Cecebre (Zerzebre, 942 CE): A parish in Cambre. First element can be *kirk- 'ring'., or a zero-grade of *korko- 'swamp'.
- Cezobre: A village in Agolada. Probably to*Kaytyobris 'Wood-hill'. Note also Setúbal, in Portugal, ancient Caetobriga.
- Cillobre: Two villages in Culleredo and Touro. The first element can be *kēlyo- 'companion', so 'Companion-Hill(fort)'.
- Ciobre: A village in Narón. The first element can be *kiwo- 'fog'.
- Coebre (Colobre, 935 CE): A village in Cesuras. The first element can be *kʷolu- 'wheel'
- Cortobe: A village in Arzúa, maybe to a first element *corto- '?Round'
- Fiobre: A village in Bergondo. The first element can be an evolution of *widu- 'wood'. Note the Portuguese inscription NIMIDI FIDUENEARUM HIC.
- Illobre: A village in Betanzos and a parish in Vedra. The first element can be *īlyo- 'swollen'. Cf. Gaulish name Iliomarus.
- Iñobre: A village in Rianxo, in a small hill by the bay of Arousa. Probably to *(p)en-yo-bris 'Hill by the Swamp/Water'.
- Ixobre: A village in Ares. Probably to *Isyo-bris. Its first element would be *iso- 'fast, powerful' (cf. Isère, a river in France).
- Landrove: A parish in Viveiro, by the Landro river. So it can simply mean 'the hill by the Landro river'; from the Celtic element *landā- 'open land'.
- Laxobre: A village in Arteixo. The first element is the same with the Galician substantive laxe 'stone slab, plain stone', medieval form lagena, to Celtic *(p)lāgenā which originated Old Irish láigean 'broad spearhead', Welsh llain 'blade'.
- Vilouchada, parish and village in Trazo, ancient Lentobre ('uilla que ab antiquis uocitabatur Lentobre et nunc uocitatur Ostulata, subtus castro Brione', 818 CE). To *Lentrobrixs '?Hillfort by the Slope', to *lentrā 'slope', cf. Welsh llethr idem.
- Lestrobe: Two villages in Dodro, and Trazo. To *Lestrobris, where the first element is Proto-Celtic *lestro- 'vessel, container; beehive'. So maybe *Lestrobris = 'Hill(fort) by the valley / depression'.
- Maiobre: A village in Ares, from *Magyobris 'Great Hill(fort)'.
- Montrove, village in Oleiros. Probably a Latin and Celtic hybrid meaning, literally, 'hill-hill'.
- O Grove (Ogrobre, 912 CE): Municipality with two parishes and a town, in a peninsula by the Atlantic Ocean. From *Okro-brixs 'Hillfort by the edge/angle' There are other three villages under the name Ogrobe, in Pontedeume, Mondoñedo, and Taboada.
- Obre: A parish in Noia (it was Olobre in 1113) and another one in Paderne. The first element can be *olo- 'behind, beyond'.
- Ombre (Anobre, 971): 5 villages in A Coruña province (in Pontedeume, O Pino, Culleredo, Miño and Brion) at or near the banks of the Tambre, Mero and Eume rivers; from Proto-Celtic *fano- 'water: swamp' .
- Pezobre: A parish in Santiso. First element appears to be the same one which originated the Galician word peza 'piece', from Proto-Celtic *kwezdi- through Gaulish *pettia-.
- Rañobre: A village in Arteixo. First element could have multiple origins, but maybe to *(p)rasn-yo- 'share, part'.
- Sansobre: A village in Vimianzo. Probably to *Sent-yo-bris, where the first element is either Celtic *sentu- 'path', or *sentiyo- 'neighbour', or even *santo- 'separated'.
- Sillobre (Siliobre, 830 CE): A parish in Fene. First element is probably *sīl 'descendant, seed'.
- Xiabre: A hill in Catoira. To *Senābris 'Old Hill(fort)', where the first element is Celtic *senā- 'old (she)'. Cf. Sanabria, Senabria in 929.
- Trobe (Talobre, 914 CE): A parish in Vedra. To *Talo-bris, cf. *talu- 'forehead, protuberance', *talamon- 'ground'.
- Tallobre: A village in Negueira de Muñiz. From *Talyo-bris, with similar origin and meaning.
- Tiobre (Toyobre, 1037 CE): A parish in Betanzos. The first element is probably related to Celtic *togyā 'roof, covering', *tegos 'house'.
- Tragove, a town in a peninsula in Cambados, by Arousa bay. Probably to *Tragobris 'Hillfort by the beach', from Celtic *trāg- 'beach, ebb, low tide'.
- Vendabre, ancient village (Uendabre, 887 CE): To *windo- 'white' and *brixs. Cf. Vindobona, ancient name of Vienna.
- Boebre (Volebre, 922 CE): A parish in Pontedeume. The first element is probably related to *welH- 'to rule'.

==== Toponyms based on a superlative ====
Another frequent type of Celtic toponyms in Galicia are those whose names are formed as a superlative, either formed with the suffix -mmo- or with the composite one -is-mmo-:

- Beresmo: A village in Avión, to Celtic *berg-is-amo- 'the highest one'.
- Ledesma: A parish in Boqueixón, in a plain by the Ulla river. To Celtic *(p)let-is-amā 'the broadest one'.
- Bama (Vama, 912 CE): A parish in Touro, to *u(p)amā 'the lowest one'.
- Bamio: A parish in Vilagarcía de Arousa, to *u(p)am-yo '(relative to) the lowest one'.
- Méixamo: A village in Navia de Suarna, to *māysamo- 'the greatest one', or to magisamo- 'the largest one'.
- Sésamo: A parish in Culleredo. To *seg-is-amo- 'The strongest one'. The same origin have Sísamo, parish in Carballo.
- Osmo (Osamo, 928 CE): A parish in Cenlle, to *owxs-amo 'the highest one'.

==== Other pre-Latin toponyms ====
Other villages and parishes have names with pre-Latin, probably Celtic, origin, specially in the coastal areas of A Coruña and Pontevedra provinces and all along the valley of the Ulla river. Among them:

- To Proto-Celtic *abank- 'wicker': Abanqueiro, medieval Avankario, parish and place with a lagoon, in Boiro.
- To Proto-Celtic *arganto- 'silver, shining': Arganzo, a village in Mañón, to *Argantyo-. Cf. Old Breton argant, Cornish argans 'silver'.
- To Proto-Celtic *bend- 'protruding peak': Bendaña, medieval Bendania, parish in Touro. Bendoiro, medieval Bendurio, parish in Lalín.
- To Proto-Celtic *brīwā 'bridge': Bribes, a parish in Cambre (Brivis, 1154 CE), and a village in Vimianzo. Formally a Latin plural locative meaning '(where) the -'. Also, Dumbría, a municipality, ancient Donovria. There are several Brives in France.
- From Proto-Celtic *dūno- 'fort': Dumbría, town, parish and municipality. It was Donobria in 830, from *Dūnobrīwā.
- From Proto-Celtic *duro- 'door': Salvaterra de Miño, which ancient name was Lacedurium (991 CE).
- From Proto-Celtic *īsarno- 'iron': Isorna, a parish in Rianxo.
- From Proto-Celtic *kambo- 'crooked, twisted': Camboño (Cambonio, 1157), parish in Lousame.
- From Proto-Celtic *kanto- 'a hundred': Cantoña, a parish in Paderne de Allariz and two villages, in Teo and O Porriño.
- From Proto-Celtic *karanto- 'friend, beloved': Carantoña, two parishes in Miño (Carantonia, 1096) and Vimianzo. A village in Lousame (Carantonio, 1157). Carantos, village in Coristanco.
- From Proto-Celtic *kerbo- 'pointed, sharp': Cervaña, parish in Silleda.
- From Proto-Celtic *lem- 'elm': Lemaio (to *Lēmawyo-), parish in Laracha.
- To Proto-Celtic *mrg- 'territory': Cambre (Calamber in 959) municipality, parish and town. Also, a parish in Malpica de Bergantiños, and a village in Carballo; Oimbra (Olimbria in 953), municipality, parish and town; Pambre, a parish in Palas de Rei (Palambre c. 1009) and a village in Ramirás.
- From Proto-Celtic *nantu- 'stream, valley': Nantes, parish in Sanxenxo; Nantón, a parish in Cabana de Bergantiños and a village in A Baña.
- From Proto-Celtic *(p)lār- 'floor': Laraño, a parish in Santiago de Compostela (Laranio, 1201), and a village in Vedra. Laranga (to *Laranicā 'Of the plain') village in Porto do Son.
- From Proto-Celtic *(p)let- 'broad, wide': Ledoño, parish in Culleredo.
- From PIE *plew- 'to flow, swim', with Celtic treatment of p and -ew- > -ow-: Loentia (Luentena, 11th century), Castro de Rei; Loenzo (two places, in Carballo, A Coruña and Vilagarcía de Arousa).
- From Proto-Celtic *salō- 'ocean': Seaia (Salagia in 830), village in Malpica de Bergantiños, and the name of an ancient coastal region comprising the actual municipalities of Malpica de Bergantiños and Ponteceso. To the derivative form *Salawyā.
- From Proto-Celtic *trebā 'settlement': Trevonzos (Trevoncio in 1176 ), village in Boiro.
- From Proto-Celtic *werno- 'alder, alder-tree': Berrimes (Vernimes, 955), a village in Lousame.
- From Proto-Celtic *windo- 'white': Bendia (Vendena in 1037), Castro de Rei; Bendoiro (Vendurio in 978), Lalín.

== See also ==
- Galician Institute for Celtic Studies
- Gallaecian language
- List of Celtic place names in Portugal
- List of Celtic place names in Italy
