= Callaecian language =

Extinct language of Iberia

Callaecian
- Native to: Iberian Peninsula
- Ethnicity: Callaeci
- Era: Attested beginning of the first millennium CE
- Language family: Indo-European: Disputed: Celtic? Italic? Italo-Celtic?; Callaecian

Language codes
- ISO 639-3: None (mis)
- Glottolog: None
- Iberia in 300 BC. Callaecia is shown as a mixture of Celtic and pre-Celtic Indo-European influences.

Callaecian or Gallaecian is the pre-Roman language, or languages, spoken by the ancient Callaeci in northwestern Iberia. The region became the Roman province of Callaecia, which is now divided between the Spanish regions of Galicia, the western parts of Asturias, León and Zamora, and the Norte Region of Portugal. The linguistic situation of pre-Roman Callaecia is complex, as it combines linguistic materials that resemble Celtic features and others that do not, probably related to Lusitanian.

== Overview ==
Classical authors Pomponius Mela, Pliny the Elder, and Strabo wrote about the existence of Celtic and non-Celtic populations in Callaecia. Most linguists consider Callaecia to be part of a common dialect continuum with Lusitania. There is controversy over the classification of the Lusitanian language. Although most scholars regard it as a non-Celtic Indo-European language, some argue that it is a Celtic language with archaic features. Apart from the Lusitanian-like elements, Celtic linguistic records abound in Callaecia as they do in Lusitania.

== Possible Celtic elements in Callaecia ==
Below are listed some hypothetical Celtic etymologies for various linguistic records from ancient Callaecia.

=== Features shared with Celtiberian and the other Celtic languages ===
- Indo-European *-ps- and *-ks- became *-xs- and were then reduced to -s-: place name AVILIOBRIS from *Awil-yo-brix-s < Proto-Celtic *Awil-yo-brig-s 'Windy hill (fort)', modern place name Osmo (Cenlle, Osamo 928 AD) from *Uχsamo- 'the highest one'.
- Original PIE *p has disappeared, having become a *φ sound before being lost completely:

Examples
- place names C(ASTELLO) OLCA from *φolkā- 'Overturned', C(ASTELLO) ERITAECO from *φerito- 'surrounded, enclosed'
- personal name ARCELTIUS, from *φari-kelt-y-os
- place name C(ASTELLO) ERCORIOBRI, from *φeri-kor-y-o-brig-s 'Overshooting hillfort'
- place name C(ASTELLO) LETIOBRI, from *φle-tyo-brig-s 'wide hillfort', or *φlei-to-brig-s 'grey hillfort';
- place name Iria Flavia, from *φīweryā- (nominative *φīwerī) 'fertile' (feminine form, cf. Sanskrit feminine pīvari- "fat");
- place name ONTONIA, from *φont-on- 'path';
- personal name LATRONIUS, to *φlā-tro- 'place; trousers'
- personal name ROTAMUS, to *φro-tamo- 'foremost';
- modern place names Bama (Touro, Vama 912) to *uφamā- 'the lowest one, the bottom' (feminine form), Iñobre (Rianxo) to *φenyo-brix-s 'Hill (fort) by the water', Bendrade (Oza dos Ríos) to *Vindo-φrātem 'White fortress', and Baiordo (Coristanco) to *Bagyo-φritu-, where the second element is proto-Celtic for 'ford'. Galician-Portuguese appellative words leira 'flat patch of land' from *φlāryā, lavego 'plough' from *φlāw-aiko-, laxe/lage 'flagstone', from medieval lagena, from *φlagĭnā, rega and rego 'furrow' from *φrikā.
The frequent instances of preserved PIE /p/ are assigned by some authors, namely Carlos Búa and Jürgen Untermann, to a single and archaic Celtic language spoken in Callaecia, Asturia and Lusitania, while others (Francisco Villar, Blanca María Prósper, Patrizia de Bernado Stempel, Jordán Colera) consider that they belong to a Lusitanian or Lusitanian-like dialect or group of dialects spoken in northern Iberia along with (but different from) Western Hispano-Celtic:
- in Galicia: divinity names and epithets PARALIOMEGO, PARAMAECO, POEMANAE, PROENETIAEGO, PROINETIE, PEMANEIECO, PAMUDENO; place names Lapatia, Paramo, Pantiñobre if from *palanti-nyo-brig-s (Búa); Galician-Portuguese appellative words lapa 'stone, rock' (cfr. Lat. lapis) and pala 'stone cavity', from *palla from *plh-sa (cfr. Germ. fels, O.Ir. All).
- in Asturias the ethnic name Paesici; personal names PENTIUS, PROGENEI; divinity name PECE PARAMECO; in León and Bragança place names PAEMEIOBRIGENSE, Campo Paramo, Petavonium.
- in other northwestern areas: place names Pallantia, Pintia, Segontia Paramica; ethnic name Pelendones.

- Indo-European sonorants between vowels, *n̥, and *m̥ have become an, am; *r̥, and *l̥ have become ri, li: place name Brigantia from *brig-ant-yā < Proto-Celtic *br̥g-n̥t-y-ā < post-Proto-Indo-European (post-PIE) *bʰr̥gʰ-n̥t-y-ā 'The towering one, the high one'; modern place names in Portugal and Galicia Braga, Bragança, Berganzo, Berganciños, Bergaña; ancient place names AOBRIGA, CALIABRIGA, CALAMBRIGA, CONIMBRIGA, CORUMBRIGA, MIROBRIGA, NEMETOBRIGA, COELIOBRIGA, TALABRIGA with second element *brigā < Proto-Celtic *br̥g-ā < post-PIE *bʰr̥gʰ-ā 'high place', and AVILIOBRIS, MIOBRI, AGUBRI with second element *bris < *brix-s < Proto-Celtic *brig-s < *br̥g-s < PIE *bʰr̥gʰ-s 'hill (fort)'; cf. English cognate borough < Old English burg "fort" < Proto-Germanic *burg-s < PIE *bʰr̥gʰ-s.
- Reduction of diphthong *ei to ē: theonym DEVORI, from *dēwo-rīg-ē < Proto-Celtic *deiwo-rēg-ei 'To the king of the gods'.
- Lenition of *m in the group *-mnV- to -unV-: ARIOUNIS MINCOSEGAECIS, dative form from *ar-yo-uno- *menekko-seg-āk-yo- 'To the (deities of the) fields of the many crops' < Proto-Celtic *ar-yo-mno- ... .
- Assimilation *p .. kʷ > *kʷ .. kʷ: tribe name Querquerni from *kʷerkʷ- < PIE *perkʷ- 'oak, tree'. Although this name has also been interpreted as Lusitanian by B. M. Prósper, she proposed recently for that language a *p .. kʷ > *kʷ .. kʷ > *p .. p assimilation.
- Reduction of diphthong *ew to *ow, and eventually to ō: personal names TOUTONUS / TOTONUS 'of the people' from *tout- 'nation, tribe' < PIE *teut-; personal names CLOUTIUS 'famous', but VESUCLOTI 'having good fame' < Proto-Celtic *Kleut-y-os, *Wesu-kleut(-y)-os; CASTELLO LOUCIOCELO < PIE *leuk- 'bright'. In Celtiberian the forms toutinikum/totinikum show the same process.
- Superlatives in -is(s)amo: place names BERISAMO < *Berg-isamo- 'The highest one', SESMACA < *Seg-isamā-kā 'The strongest one, the most victorious one'. The same etymology has been proposed for the modern place names Sésamo (Culleredo) and Sísamo (Carballo), from *Segisamo-; modern place name Méixamo from Magisamo- 'the largest one'.
- Syncope (loss) of unstressed vowels in the vicinity of liquid consonants: CASTELLO DURBEDE, if from *dūro-bedo-.
- Reduction of Proto-Celtic *χt cluster to Hispano-Celtic *t: personal names AMBATUS, from Celtic *ambi-aχtos, PENTIUS < *k^{w}enχto- 'fifth'.

=== Features not shared with Celtiberian ===
- In contact with *e or *i, intervocalic consonant *-g- tends to disappear: theonym DEVORI from *dēworīgē 'To the king of the gods'; adjective derived of a place name SESMACAE < *Seg-isamā-kā 'The strongest one, the most victorious one'; personal names MEIDUENUS < *Medu-genos 'Born of mead', CATUENUS < *Katu-genos 'Born of the fight'; inscription NIMIDI FIDUENEARUM HIC < *widu-gen-yā. But Celtiberian place name SEGISAMA and personal name mezukenos show preservation of /g/.
- *-lw- and *-rw- become -lβ-, -rβ- (as in Irish): MARTI TARBUCELI < *tarwo-okel- 'To Mars of the Hill of the Bull', but Celtiberian TARVODURESCA.
- Late preservation of *(-)φl- which becomes (-)βl- and only later is reduced to a simple (-)l- sound: place names BLETISAM(AM), BLETIS(AMA), modern Ledesma (Boqueixón) < *φlet-isamā 'widest'; BLANIOBRENSI, medieval Laniobre < *φlān-yo-brigs 'hillfort on the plain'. But Celtiberian place name Letaisama.
- *wl- is maintained: VLANA < PIE *wl̥Hn-eh₂ 'wool', while Celtiberian has l-: launi < PIE *wl̥H-mn-ih₂ 'woolly' (?).
- Sometimes *wo- appears as wa-: VACORIA < *(d)wo-kor-yo- 'who has two armies', VAGABROBENDAM < *uφo-gabro-bendā 'lower goat mountain' (see above).
- Dative plural ending -bo < PIE *bʰo, while Celtiberian had -bos: LUGOUBU/LUCUBO 'To (the three gods) Lug'.

=== Q-Celtic ===
Under the P/Q Celtic hypothesis, Callaecian appears to be a Q-Celtic language, as evidenced by the following occurrences in local inscriptions: ARQVI, ARCVIVS, ARQVIENOBO, ARQVIENI[S], ARQVIVS, all probably from IE Paleo-Hispanic *arkʷios 'archer, bowman', retaining proto-Celtic *kʷ. It is also noteworthy the ethnonyms Equaesi ( < PIE *ek̂wos 'horse'), a people from southern Callaecia, and the Querquerni ( < *perkʷ- 'oak'). Nevertheless, some old toponyms and ethnonyms, and some modern toponyms, have been interpreted as showing kw / kʷ > p: Pantiñobre (Arzúa, composite of *kʷantin-yo- '(of the) valley' and *brix-s 'hill(fort)') and Pezobre (Santiso, from *kweityo-bris), ethnonym COPORI "the Bakers" from *pok^{w}ero- 'to cook', old place names Pintia, in Galicia and among the Vaccei, from PIE *penk^{w}tó- > Celtic *k^{w}enχto- 'fifth'.

== Roman inscriptions ==
Some local Roman inscriptions incorporating autochthonous names, appellatives, and phrases

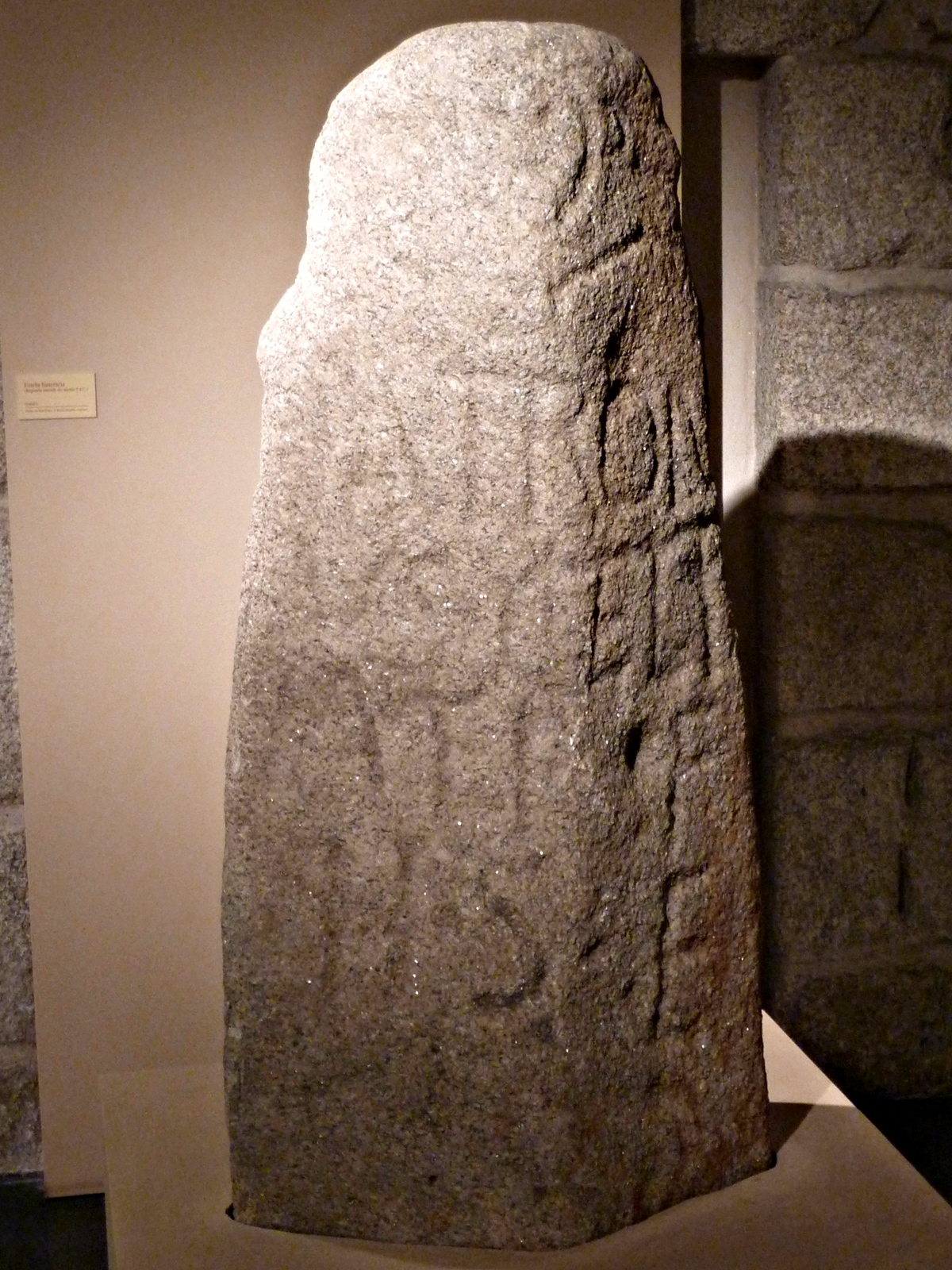
Anthropomorphic stele with Latin inscription, and local anthroponyms (from Verín, Ourense, Galicia): LATRONIUS CELTIATI F(ilius) H(ic) S(itus) E(st)

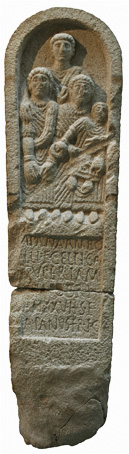
Stele with Latin inscription (from Mera town, Lugo, Galicia): APANA AMBOLLI F(ilia) CELTICA SVPERTAM(arica) [Castello] MIOBRI AN(norum) XXV H(ic) S(itus) E(st) APANVS FR(ater) F(aciendum) C(uravit).

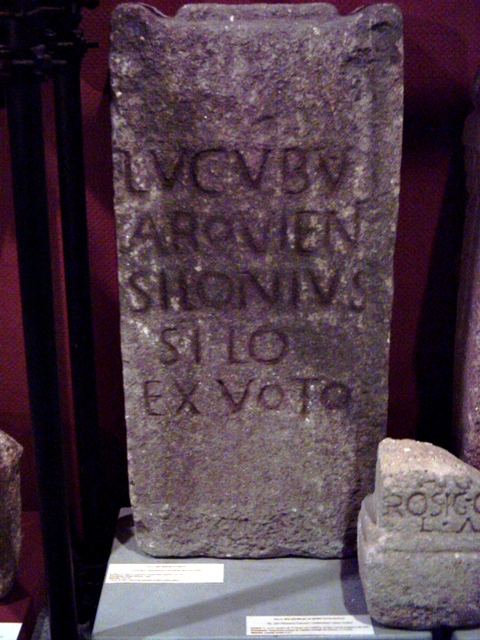
Votive inscription to Lug (from Sinogas town, Lugo, Galicia): LUCOUBU ARQUIEN(obu) SILONIUS SILO EX VOTO

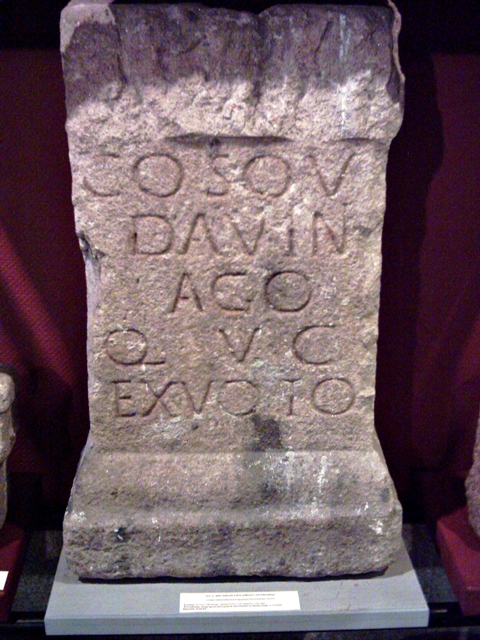
Votive inscription to the local deity Coso (from Meiras town, A Coruña, Galicia): COSOU DAVINIAGO Q(uintus) V() C() EX VOTO

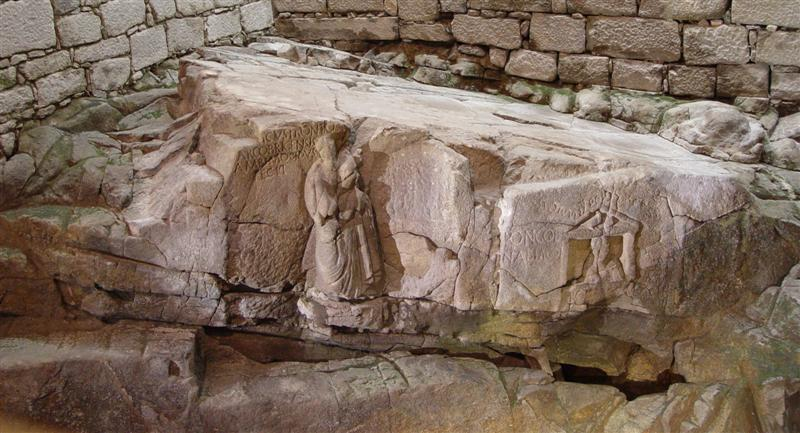
Inscriptions in Braga, Portugal: [Ce]LICUS FRONTO ARCOBRIGENSIS AMBIMOGIDUS FECIT; and TONGOE NABIAGOI CELICUS FECIT FRONT[o]

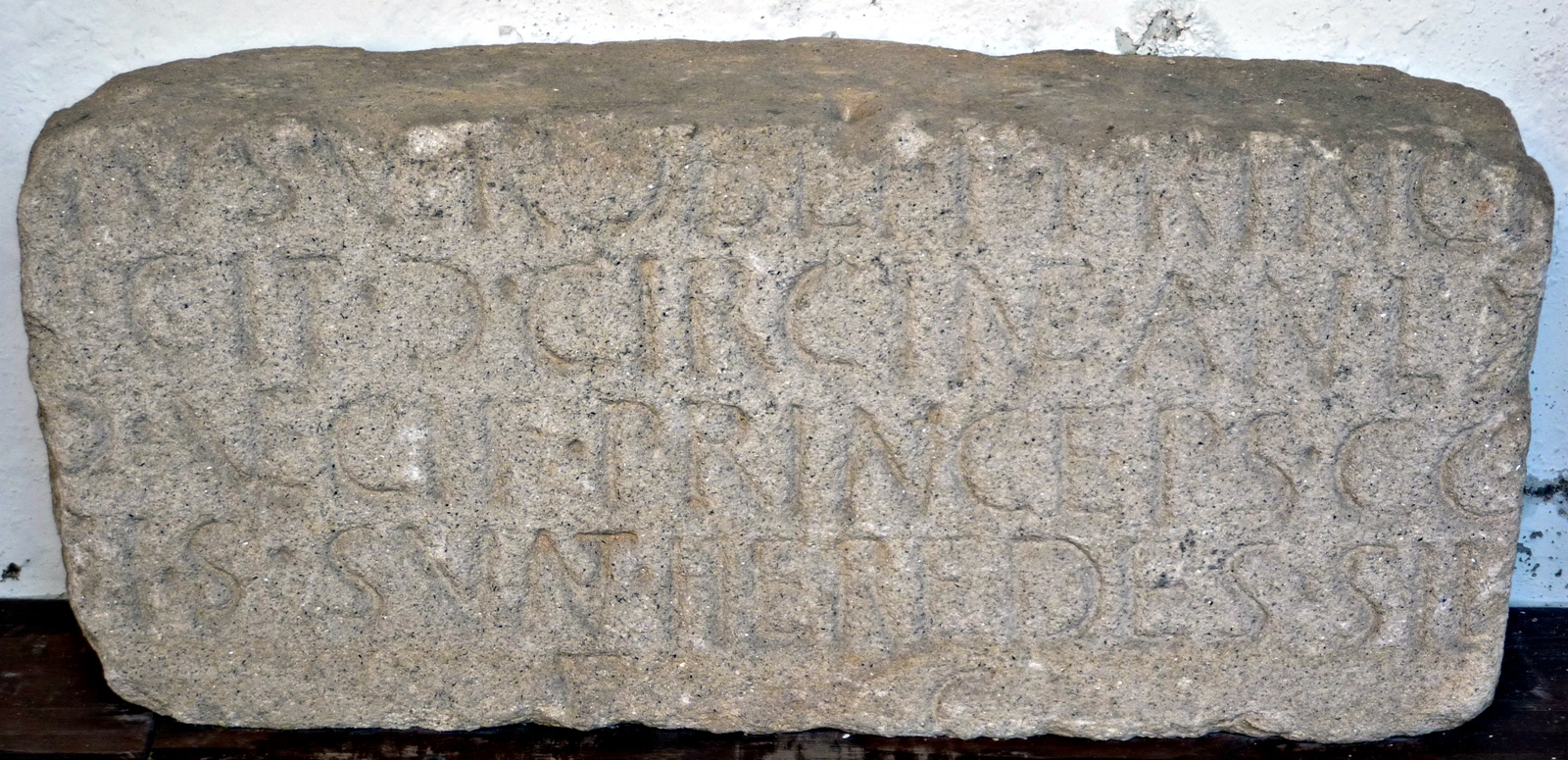
Galician Latin inscription (from Lugo city, Galicia): VECIUS VEROBLII F(ilius) PRICE[ps ...] CIT(...) C(ASTELLO) CIRCINE AN(norum) LX [...]O VECI F(ilius) PRINCEPS CO[...]

== See also ==
- Lusitanian language
- List of Celtic place names in Galicia
- List of Celtic place names in Portugal
- Hispano-Celtic languages
- Celtiberian language
- Continental Celtic languages
- List of Galician words of Celtic origin
- Portuguese vocabulary
- Galician Institute for Celtic Studies

== Bibliography ==
- Búa, Carlos (2007) O Thesaurus Paleocallaecus, in Kremer, Dieter, ed. (2007). Onomástica galega : con especial consideración da situación prerromana : actas do primeiro Coloquio de Trier 19 e 20 de maio de 2006. Santiago de Compostela: Universidade de Santiago de Compostela. ISBN 978-84-9750-794-3.
- Curchin, Leonard A. (2008) Estudios GallegosThe toponyms of the Roman Galicia: New Study. CUADERNOS DE ESTUDIOS GALLEGOS LV (121): 109-136.
- DCECH = Coromines, Joan (2012). Diccionario crítico etimológico castellano e hispánico. Madrid: Gredos. ISBN 978-84-249-3654-9.
- Delamarre, Xavier (2012). Noms de lieux celtiques de l'Europe ancienne (−500 / +500): dictionnaire. Arles: Errance. ISBN 978-2-87772-483-8.
- Jordán Cólera, Carlos (March 16, 2007). "Celtiberian" (PDF). E-Keltoi. 6. Archived from the original (PDF) on 24 June 2011.
- Koch, John T. (2011). Tartessian 2 : The inscription of Mesas do Castelinho ro and the verbal complex preliminaries to historical phonology. Aberystwyth: University of Wales, Centre for Advanced Welsh and Celtic Studies. ISBN 978-1-907029-07-3.
- Luján Martínez, Eugenio R. (2006) The Language(s) of the Callaeci. e-Keltoi 6: 715-748.
- Moralejo, Juan José (2010). "TOPÓNIMOS CÉLTICOS EN GALICIA" (PDF). Paleohispánica. 10.
- Prósper, Blanca María (2002). Lenguas y religiones prerromanas del occidente de la península ibérica. Ediciones Universidad de Salamanca. pp. 422–427. ISBN 84-7800-818-7.
- Prósper, Blanca María and Francisco Villar (2005). Vascos, Celtas e Indoeuropeos: Genes y lenguas. Ediciones Universidad de Salamanca. ISBN 978-84-7800-530-7.
- Prósper, Blanca María (2012). "Indo-European Divinities that Protected Livestock and the Persistence of Cross-Linguistic Semantic Paradigms: Dea Oipaingia". The Journal of Indo-European Studies. 40 (1–2): 46–58.
- Vallejo Ruiz, José María (2005). Antroponimia indígena de la Lusitania romana. Vitoria-Gasteiz: Univ. del País Vasco [u.a.] ISBN 8483737469.
- Wodtko, Dagmar S. (2010). "The Problem of Lusitanian". In Cunliffe, Barry; Koch, John T. (eds.). Celtic from the West. Oxford, UK: Oxbow books. ISBN 978-1-84217-475-3.
