= List of Latin place names in Iberia =

This list includes countries and regions in the Iberian Peninsula (Latin Hispania) that were part of the Roman Empire, or that were given Latin place names in historical references.

== Background ==
Until the Modern Era, Latin was the common language for scholarship and mapmaking. During the 19th and 20th centuries, German scholars in particular have made significant contributions to the study of historical place names, or Ortsnamenkunde. These studies have, in turn, contributed to the study of genealogy. For genealogists and historians of pre-Modern Europe, knowing alternate names of places is vital to extracting information from both public and private records. Even specialists in this field point out, however, that the information can be easily taken out of context, since there is a great deal of repetition of place names throughout Europe; reliance purely on apparent connections should therefore be tempered with valid historical methodology.

== Caveats and notes ==
Latin place names are not always exclusive to one place – for example, there were several Roman cities whose names began with Colonia and then a more descriptive term. During the Middle Ages, these were often shortened to just Colonia. One of these, Colonia Agrippinensis, retains the name today in the form of Cologne.

Early sources for Roman names show numerous variants and spellings of the Latin names.

The modern canonical name is listed first. Sources are listed chronologically. In general, only the earliest source is shown for each name, although many of the names are recorded in more than one of the sources. Where the source differs in spelling, or has other alternatives, these are listed following the source. As an aid to searching, variants are spelled completely, and listed in most likely chronology.

Superscripts indicate:

1. Latinized form of the Greek-derived name.
2. Latinized form of the Asian-derived name via Greek.
3. Altered Latinized form of the Greek-derived name.

== Gibraltar ==
Canonical Latin name (source(s): variant(s))	English name (native language(s)) – older name(s), (other language(s)), location(s)
Calpe (2PG3), Mons Calpe, Gibraltaria	Gibraltar

== Portugal ==
=== Cities and towns ===
Canonical Latin name (source(s): variant(s))	English name (native language(s)) – older name(s), (other language(s)), location(s)
Aeminium	Coimbra
Aquae Flaviae	Chaves
Arabriga	Alenquer
Arandis	Garvão, a parish of Ourique
Aretium	Alvega
Aviarium	Aveiro
Baesuris, Esuri	Castro Marim
Balsa	west of Tavira
Bevipo	Alcácer do Sal
Bracara Augusta	Braga
Brigantia	Bragança
Caeciliana	(a Roman villa between Caetobriga and Malateca)
Caetobriga	Tróia, near Setúbal
Calipolis	Vila Viçosa
Castra Leuca	Castelo Branco
Cilpes	Silves
Civitas Aravorum	Marialva Castle, near Mêda
Civitas Calabriga	Monte do Castelo, Almendra
Civitas Cobelcorum	Almofala, Figueira de Castelo Rodrigo
Centum Cellae	Colmeal da Torre, a parish of Belmonte
Collipo	S. Sebastião do Freixo – Golpilheira, Batalha
Conímbriga	Condeixa-a-Nova, south of Coimbra (the inhabitants of Conímbriga fled to nearby Aeminium, the ancient name of Coimbra, in 468)
Conistorgis	(location unknown in the Algarve or Baixo-Alentejo)
Dipo	Elvas
Ebora, Ebora Cerealis, Liberalitas Julia	Évora
Eburobritium, Eburobrittium	Óbidos
Egiptania, Igaeditania	Idanha-a-Velha
Equabona	Coina, a parish of Barreiro
Guimaranis, Vimaranis	Guimarães
Ipses	Alvor
Lacobriga, Laccobriga	Lagos
Lamecum	Lamego
Lancobriga	Fiães, a parish of Santa Maria da Feira
Lorica	Loriga, a parish of Seia
Malateca	Marateca, a parish of Palmela
Metallum Vipascense	Mina de Aljustrel, central Alentejo
Mirobriga Celticorum	Santiago do Cacém
Mondobriga	Alter do Chão
Moron	near Santarém
Myrtilis Iulia	Mértola
Nabantia, Nabancia, Selleum, Sellium	Tomar
Olisipo, Olisipo Felicitas Iulia, Felicitas Julia Olissipo, Ulyssipolis, Ulisseia	Lisbon (Lisboa)
Ossonoba	Faro
Pax Iulia, Pax Augusta, Colonia Civitas Pacensis	Beja
Portus Alacer	Portalegre
Portus Cale	Vila Nova de Gaia, Porto
Portus Hannibalis	Portimão
Salacia	Alcácer do Sal
Scalabis	Santarém
Sirpe	Serpa
Sinus	Sines
Talabara	Alpedrinha, a parish of Fundão
Talabriga	Marnel, near Águeda
Tongobriga	Freixo, Marco de Canaveses
Tubucci Aurantes	Abrantes
Veniatia	Vinhais
Villa Euracini	Póvoa de Varzim
Vipasca	Aljustrel
Vissaium	Viseu

=== Rivers ===
Fl. Fluvius (Latin), R. Rio (Portuguese)

Roman name	Modern name
Minius Fl.	R. Minho
Limia Fl.	R. Lima
Tamaca Fl.	R. Tâmega
Durius Fl.	R. Douro
Vacua Fl.	R. Vouga
Monda Fl.	R. Mondego
Tagus Fl.	R. Tejo
Calipus Fl.	R. Sado
Ana vel Anas Fl.	R. Guadiana
Nabantius Fl.	R. Nabão

=== Mountains ===
Roman name	Modern name
Herminius Mons	Serra da Estrela, its former name meant the Mountains of Hermes.
Lunae Mons	Serra de Sintra, its former name meant the Mountains of the Moon.

== Spain ==
=== Cities and towns ===
Canonical Latin name (source(s): variant(s))	English name (native language(s)) – older name(s), (other language(s)), location(s)
Abdera	Adra, Andalusia
Acinipo	Ronda la Vieja, near Ronda, Andalusia
Allabo	Alagón, Aragon
Arunda	Ronda, Andalusia
Asturica Augusta	Astorga, León
Baelo Claudia	Bolonia, a village near Tarifa, Andalusia
Baetulo	Badalona, Catalonia
Barcino	Barcelona, Catalonia
Baria	Villaricos, Andalusia
Beligio	Belchite / Azuara / Azaila, Aragon
Bilbilis	Calatayud, Aragon
Flavium Brigantium	probably Betanzos, Galicia
Bursao	Borja, Aragon
Caesaraugusta	Zaragoza, Aragon
Calagurris	Calahorra, La Rioja
Carthago Nova	Cartagena
Colonia Clunia Sulpicia	Clunia, Burgos
Colonia Victrix Iulia Lepida / C. V. I. Celsa	Gelsa / Velilla de Ebro, Aragon
Complutum	Alcalá de Henares, Madrid
Contrebia Belaisca	Botorrita, Aragon
Corduba (2PG3)	Córdoba
Dertusa	Tortosa, Catalonia
Egara	Terrassa, Catalonia
Emerita Augusta	Mérida
Flaviobriga	Castro Urdiales, Cantabria
Gades	Cádiz, Andalusia
Gerunda	Girona, Catalonia
Granata	Granada
Hispalis (2PG3)	Seville
Iacca	Jaca, Aragon
Ilerda	Lleida, Catalonia
Iluro	Mataró, Catalonia
Iria Flavia	Iria Flavia, Galicia
Labitolosa	La Puebla de Castro, Aragon
Legio VII Gemina	León
Lucentum	Alicante
Lucus Augusti	Lugo, Galicia
Matrice	Madrid
Malaca (2PG3)	Málaga
Minorisa	Manresa, Catalonia
Numantia	Soria
Oiasso	Oiartzun, Basque Country
Pompaelo, Pampalona, Pampelona	Pamplona, Navarre
Salmantica	Salamanca
Segeda	Belmonte de Gracián / Mara, Aragon
Tarraco	Tarragona, Catalonia
Toletum	Toledo
Tude, Tyde	Tui, Galicia
Turiaso	Tarazona, Aragon
Urci	Almería, Andalusia
Valentia	Valencia
Virgis	Berja

== See also ==
- Chemical elements named after places (several element names employ Latin place names)
- List of Celtic place names in Portugal
- List of Latin place names used as specific names
