= List of Celtic place names in Portugal =

In the area of modern Portugal a significant number of towns with Celtic toponymic were already mentioned by ancient Greek and Roman authors.

The regions where we can find a greater number of these names are in the north (inhabited by the Callaici or Callaeci) and center (inhabited by the Lusitanians) of Portugal. However, Celtic toponymy occurs throughout the whole country and is also found in the south (the Alentejo, inhabited by the Celtici, and the Algarve, inhabited by the Cynetes), which correspond to the ancient Roman provinces of Gallaecia and Lusitania.

The name of Portugal (Portvgalliæ) itself is partly of Celtic origin (see: Name of Portugal and Portus Cale).

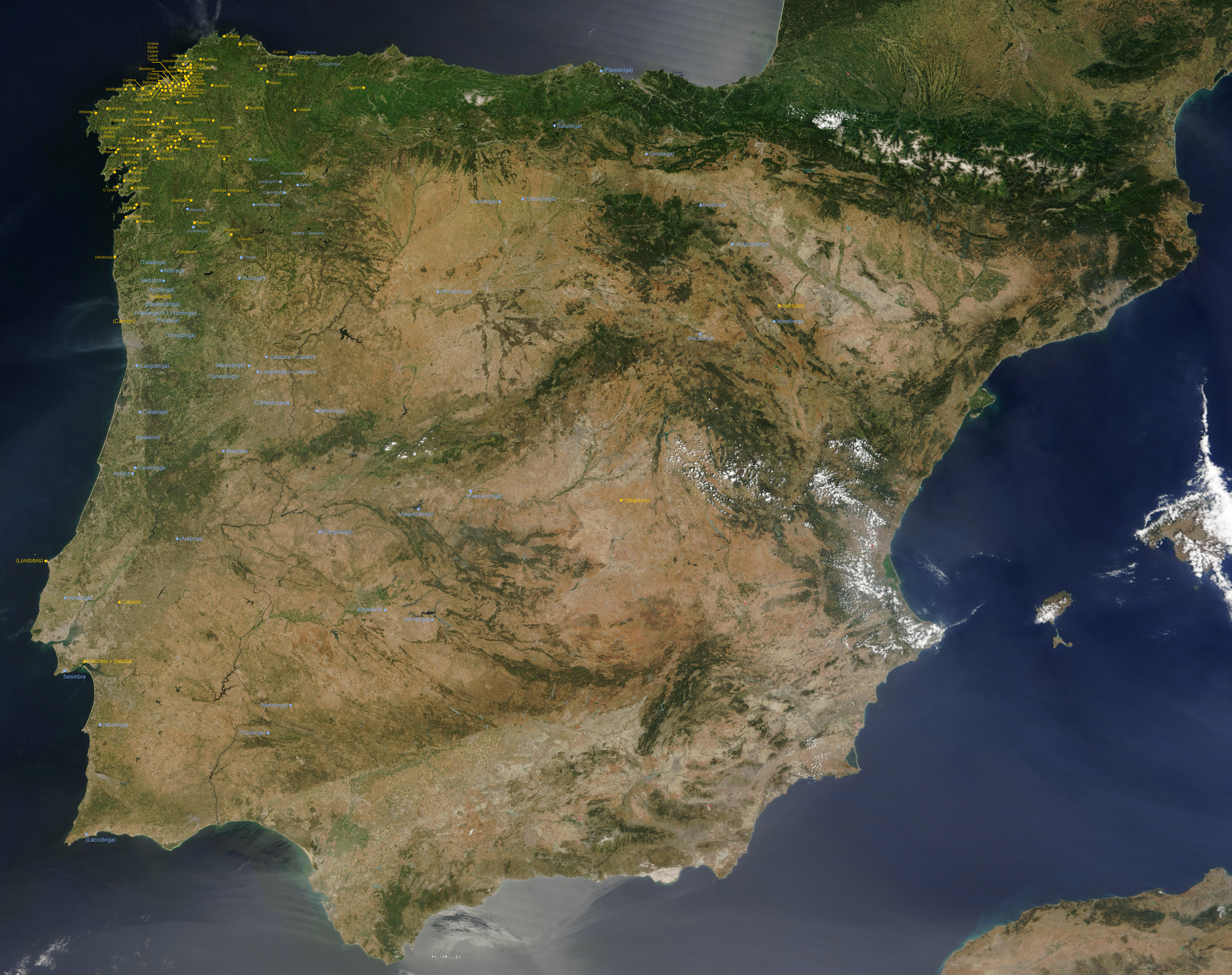
Ancient (bracketed) and modern places in the Iberian Peninsula which have names containing the Celtic elements -brigā or -bris < -brixs 'hill, hillfort'. Celtic toponymy of Portugal (Western side of Iberia) is shown light-blue and yellow on the map.

== List of towns and places ==
Celtic name	Modern name
Anobrega	Ponte da Barca
Anobra	Anobra in Condeixa-a-Nova. Likely derived from ānniyobris "hill", "ring" (Cf. old Irish ainne "ring"),
Arabriga	probably Alenquer or between Sesimbra and Outão
Arcobica	probably Torrão in Alcácer do Sal
Arcobriga	probably near Braga
Aritium Praetorium	probably Tamazim, near Bemposta
Aritium oppidum vetus	Casal da Várzea
Aritium Vetus	Alvega in Abrantes
Aranni	probably near Ourique
Arandis	near Ourique
Ardila	
Armona	Ilha de Armona
Auobriga/ *Aobriga	in the Ave Valley region
Equabonna/Aquabona	Coina in Barreiro
Auaron Pr.	Carreiro in Póvoa de Varzim (Cape Santo André)
Axabrica/Axabrix	Xabregas
Boidobr(ig)a (?)	Boidobra, in Covilhã. A combination of two elements: boudi or *boudo- 'victory' (Welsh budd 'gain, benefit') and "briga".
Bracara	Braga
Brigantia	Bragança
Brita/s	
Budens	Budens
*Burrulobriga	around Elvas
Caetobriga/Caetobrix/Kaitobrix	Setúbal
Caeilobricoi	Castro Daire in Lamas de Moledo
Calabria > Caliabriga	Castelo Calabre in Vila Nova de Foz Côa
Caladunum	probably Vilar de Perdizes in Montalegre
Cambra<Calambriga	Vale de Cambra (Aveiro), Casal de Cambra (Sintra)
Cale	Vila Nova de Gaia; Portucale; Portugal
Cantippo	
Castellum Araocelum	São Cosmado in Mangualde
Catraleucus/ Contraleuco	
Cempsibriga	Sesimbra
Colobre	Alcolobre in Constância (Colobre, 935 C.E.): the first element derives from *k^{w}olu- 'wheel'
Conimbriga	Conímbriga, Condeixa-a-Nova; Coimbra (name only)
Civitas Aravorum <Aravi>	Marialva
Collippo	Batalha
Corumbriga	
Cottaiobriga	near Almeida
Ebora	Évora
Eburobrittium	Óbidos
*Elaneobriga	around Braga
Evion
Ercobriga	
Etobrico	Alenquer
Jerabrica/Gerabrica/Hierabrica	between Lisbon and Santarém
Jurumegna	Juromenha in Alandroal
Lacobriga	Lagos
Lamecum	Lamego
Langobriga	Fiães
castello Letiobri	around Braga
Lemos	
Londobris	Berlengas
Longobriga	Longroiva in Mêda
Lubrigos	Vila Real
Civitas Aravorum <Aravi>	Marialva (Mêda)
Malaceca/Malateca	Marateca
Medrobiga	Marvão
Meidubriga	in Beira Alta
Mirobriga	Miróbriga
Mirobriga	Montemor o Velho
Meribriga/Merebriga	in Alentejo
Merobriga	probably Sines or near river Mira
Montobriga/Mundobriga	around Castelo de Vide
Moron	Almorol or Montalvão
Ocelum	Ferro probably in Covilhã
Pendraganum	Pedrógão Grande
Seliobriga	São Martinho de Pedrulhais in Sepins
Senabriga	Seia
Talabriga	Lamas do Vouga
Talabriga	Ponte de Lima, Estourãos
Tameobriga	near Paiva and Douro
Terena	Terena
Tongobriga/ Tuntobriga	Freixo, Marco de Canaveses
Tur(o)lobriga	around Chaves
Uxonoba	
Vicus Camalocensis	around Crato
Vicus Veniensis	Cabeço de Lameirão in Meimoa
Vipasca	Aljustrel

== List of rivers ==
Celtic name	Modern name
Arda from Proto-Celtic *ardwo-	Arda
Latinised Arduinna from Celtic *ardwo- hight, related to forests, Goddess of the forests	Ardena
Ardila *same as above	Ardila
Latinised Arauca from Celtic	Arouca
Latinised Arauca from Celtic	Arouce
Latinised Arauca from Celtic	Arunca
Latinised Cavalum from Celtic/Gaulish *caballos - horse	Cavalum
Lethes	Lima
Minius	Minho
Munda, Latinised Mundaecus or Mondaecus	Mondego
Latinised Tamaga, likely from Tamaca	Tâmega

== See also ==
- Roman Geography of Portugal
- List of Celtic place names in Galicia
- List of Latin place names in Iberia
- List of Celtic place names in Italy
