= Portucale =

Portucale can mean:

- Portus Cale, old Roman name of an ancient town and port in current day Portugal, in the area of today's Grande Porto (north of the country)
- Portucale, the name by which, at the time of the Suebi and Visigoths, the area of today's Grande Porto was known
- County of Portugal, the predecessor of the kingdom of Portugal
- Portugal, the European country, whose name derives from Portucale
- Porto (also Oporto), a city in northern Portugal and the second largest city in Portugal. The name Porto comes from the Portu root of Portucale
  - Vila Nova de Gaia, or simply Gaia, a city in Portugal, in the Porto district. The name Gaia comes from the Cale root of Portucale
