= Conventus iuridicus =

Ancient Roman seat of judicial district of a province

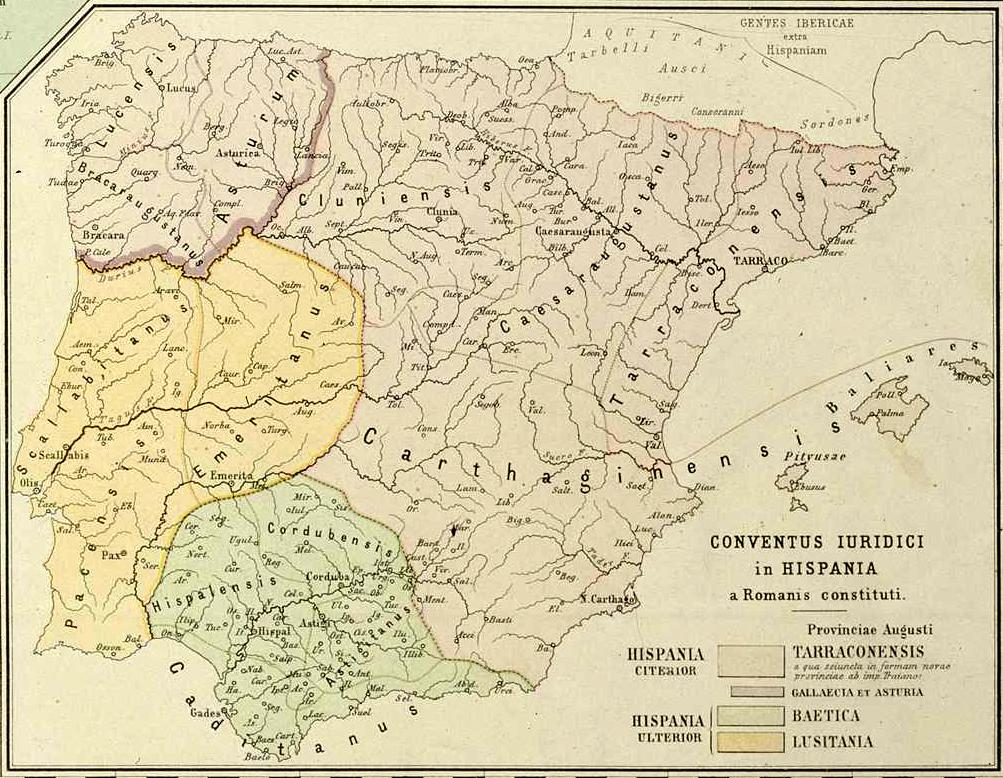
Conventus juridici in Hispania

In Ancient Rome territorial organization, a conventus iuridicus was the capital city of a subdivision of some provinces (Dalmatia, Hispania, Asia) with functions of seat of a district court of justice and maybe others.

== Hispania ==
During the rule of Claudius, the three provinces of Hispania were divided into fourteen conventus:

Hispania Tarraconensis was divided into seven conventus:

1. Tarraconensis (Tarraco)
2. Caesaraugustanus (Caesaraugusta)
3. Cluniensis (Clunia)
4. Carthaginensis (Carthago Nova)
5. Asturicensis (Asturica Augusta)
6. Lucensis (Lucus Augusti)
7. Bracarensis (Bracara Augusta)

The last three conventus, later, would be form the province of Gallaecia.

The province of Hispania Baetica was divided into four conventus:

1. Cordubensis (Corduba)
2. Hispalensis (Hispalis)
3. Gaditanus (Gadir)
4. Astigianus (Astigi)

The province of Lusitania was divided into three conventus:

1. Emeritensis (Augusta Emerita)
2. Scalabitanus (Scallabis)
3. Pacensis (Pax Iulia)

== Dalmatia ==
Pliny the Elder mentioned three conventus in the province of Dalmatia:

1. Scardonitanus (Scardona)
2. Salonensis (Salona)
3. Naronensis (Narona)

== Asia ==
In Asia, the conventus or iurisdictiones existed before Augustus, and according to epigraphy, probably under Caligula, there were thirteen. The size of these districts was not uniform, and their boundaries were more fixed based on the transport of goods rather than between the solidarity between cities. The organization varied over time, according to the rivalries between the cities to have the honor of being the seat of a governor. Pliny mentioned eight conventus in Asia:

1. Cibyraticus (Cibyra)
2. Synnadensis (Synnada)
3. Apamensis (Apamea)
4. Alabandensis (Alabanda)
5. Sardensis (Sardes)
6. Smyrnensis (Smyrna)
7. Adramytteos (Adramyttium)
8. Pergamenus (Pergamum)
