= Galician Institute for Celtic Studies =

Logo of the IGEC, as it features on its official Facebook page (2011)

The Instituto Galego de Estudos Célticos (IGEC) (English: Galician Institute for Celtic Studies) is a Galician non-profit learned society established in 2009. The Institute's main goal is to promote multidisciplinary research in the field of Celtic studies in Galicia, northern Portugal and throughout Atlantic Europe, with a special emphasis on the so-called Celtic Countries and peoples of Celtic origin. The IGEC also promotes general knowledge of history, culture and society of Galicia, as well as academic and scientific exchange. Moreover, the Institute aims at recovering and preserving - on an educated basis - elements of Celtic culture present and visible in contemporary Galician society.

The IGEC came to the public fora by organising in April 2011 the Third International Congress on Celtic Culture ('The Celts of Atlantic Europe'), in the Galician town of Narón. A number of delegates of the IGEC attended and presented communications later on that year at the XIVth International Congress of Celtic Studies in Maynooth, Ireland.

The Institute is self-governing and independent, although most of its members are linked to academia and often work as professionals in the areas of archaeology, history, geography, linguistics, consulting and social sciences.

== Members and contributors ==
- Dr André Pena Graña, President of the IGEC. Doctor in Archaeology and Ancient History. Head of History and Archaeology of the City of Narón and professional archivist.
- Michelette Harris, Administrative Director of the IGEC. Graduate in Philosophy and Education, entrepreneur.
- Laureano F. Carballo, archaeologist and independent researcher. Specialist in the Bronze Age period and numismatics.

Former members: Heitor Rodal (founding president), Carlos Solla Varela, José Manuel Barbosa, Xoán M. Paredes, Dr Blanca García Fernández-Albalát, Dr Higino Martins Estêvez.

Emeritus members and contributors: Dr Venceslas Kruta, Dr Jean Haudry, Dr. Fabien Regnier.

In memoriam: Dr Robert Omnes, former professor in linguistics at the University of Rennes (Brittany). Specialist in Celtic studies, Breton-Galician relations and former president of the Galicia-Brittany Committee. He was an enthusiastic supporter of the theory linking old Celtic languages and modern Galician language.

== See also ==
- Britonia
- Castro Culture
- Celtic place-names in Galicia
- Gallaeci
- Gallaecian (Celtic) language
