= Conventus Bracarensis =

Administrative region of the Roman province of Gallaecia

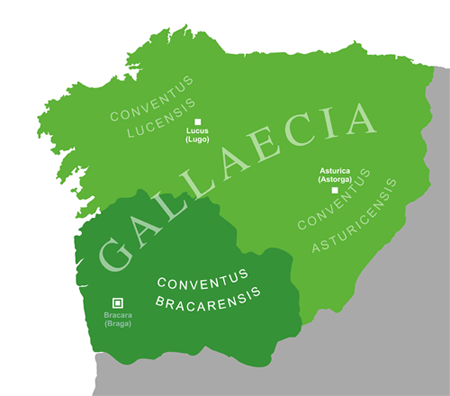
Map of the Conventus bracarensis in Gallaecia, 3rd to 4th centuries.

The Conventus Bracarensis (conventus iuridicus of Bracara Augusta), was a Roman administrative unit located in the northwest of the Iberian Peninsula, in Gallaecia. Its name derives from its capital Bracara Augusta (ancient Braga), a citadel established by the Romans, which became the convent's administrative center. Its southern limit was the river Douro, it marked the streak with the Roman province of Lusitania. In the north, its limits were the river Verdugo (located in the southern part of Galicia), and the river Sil, both marked the border with the Conventus lucensis (also in Gallaecia). Its eastern borders were marked by the river Navea, a tributary of the Sil, that limited with the Conventus asturicensis.

The convent was home to some native citadels and small villages inhabited by Gallaeci tribes, of Celtic origin, occupying all the territory and the Grovii, of possible Greek origin, living in the coast near river mouths.
