= Lemavi =

Celtic tribe who inhabited in the Roman province of Hispania Gallaecia

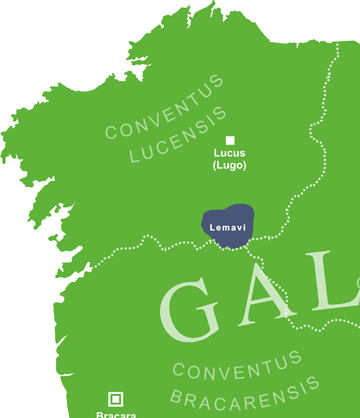
Map of Gallaecia

The Lemavi were an ancient Gallaecian Celtic tribe, living in the center-east of the modern Galicia, in the Monforte de Lemos's county.

== See also ==
- Pre-Roman peoples of the Iberian Peninsula
