= Conventus Lucensis =

Administrative region within the Roman province of Gallaecia

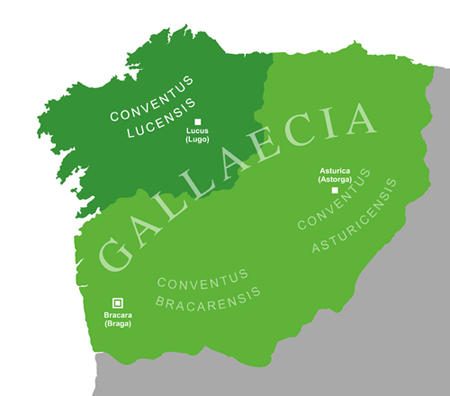
Map of the Conventus lucensis in Gallaecia, 3rd and 4th centuries

The Conventus Lucensis (conventus iuridicus of Lucus Augusti), was a Roman administrative unit located in the northwest of the Iberian Peninsula, in Gallaecia. Its name derives from its capital Lucus Augusti (ancient Lugo), the most important city in this convent, economical and administrative center of the country. Its Southern borders were marked by the river Verdugo, and the river Sil (limit with the Conventus bracarensis, in the north the coastline from Morrazo until river Navia (current Asturias), in the East the Ancares' mountains and the Conventus asturicensis.
