= Quaquerni =

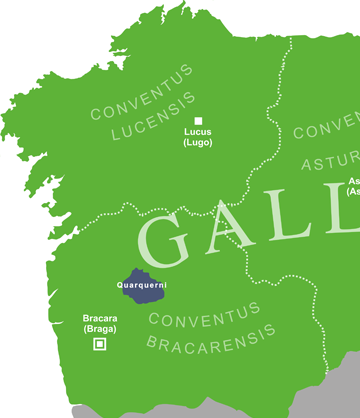
Map of Gallaecia

The Quaquerni or Querquerni were an ancient tribe of Gallaecia, living in the Baixa Limia region of southern Galicia, where the Roman fort of Aquis Querquennis has been found.

== Ethnonym ==
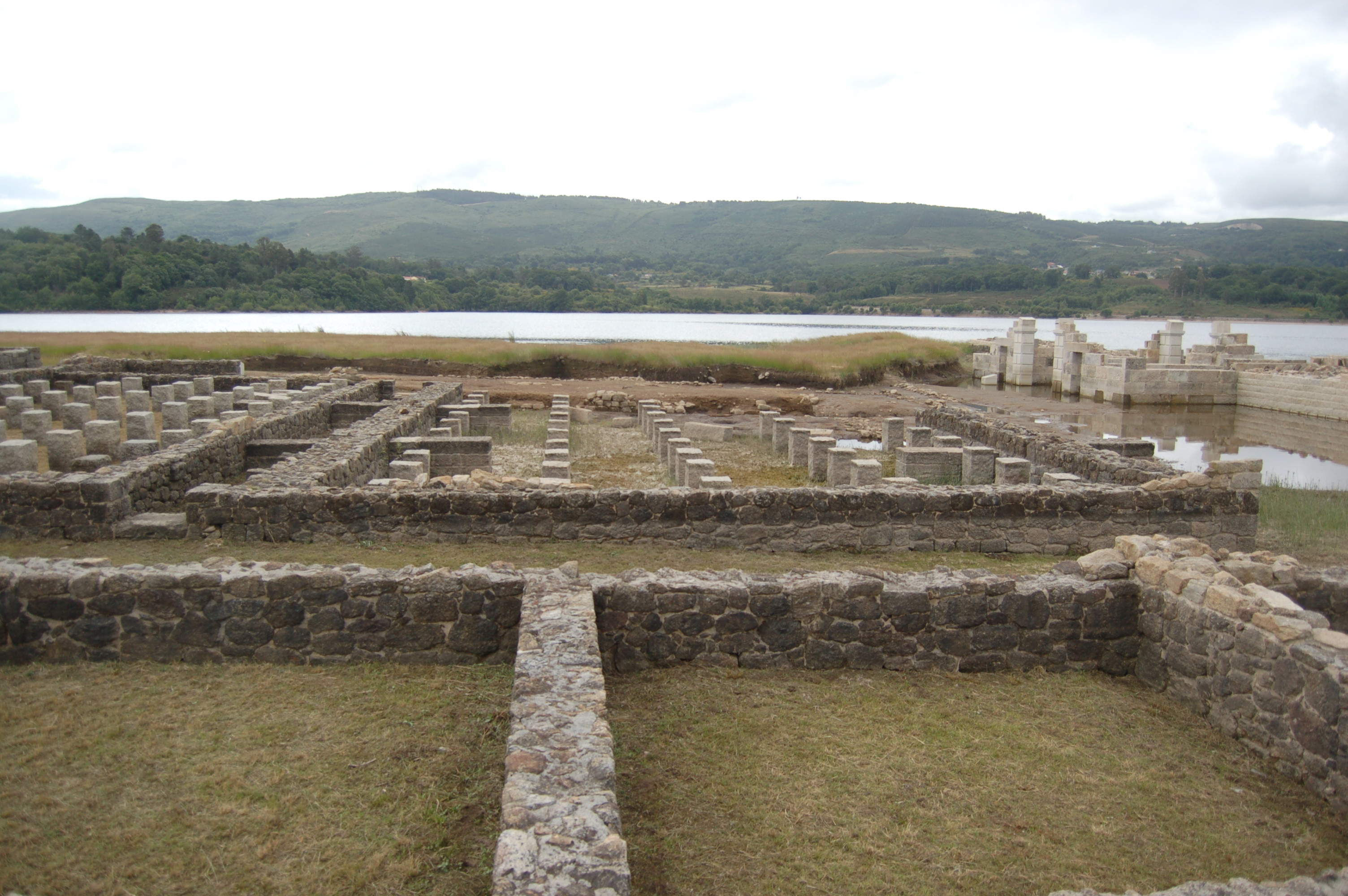
Aquis Querquennis Roman fort, Bande, Galicia

=== Historical sources ===
The Quaquerni are also known by the name Quarquerni, Querquernoi, or Quacernoi. Their ethnonym is registered as Κουακερνοί (Kouakernoí), by Greek geographer Ptolemy in his Geographies. Scholars see a possible connection with Venetic Quarqueni, as registered by Pliny and located somewhere in historical Istria.

=== Etymology ===
The name Querquerni is probably related to Latin quercus ("oak"), which stems from Proto-Indo-European root *pérkʷus, meaning "oak". It is probably a Q-Celtic formation meaning "the Oak People / Warriors", related to:

- Middle Irish ceirt "apple-tree", Middle Welsh perth "bush", from *kʷerxt-, from an earlier *kʷerkʷt- < *perkʷt-
- the Continental Celtic toponyms Hercynian Forest and the Pannonian tribe Hercuniates, where the early delabialization of kʷ before u prevented p.. kʷ > kʷ .. kʷ: so *perkʷunia > *perkunia > *fercunia; note that there is no u after kʷ in *kʷerkʷern-. They are all related to the Germanic branch maybe borrowed from Pre-Celtic *percunia, that is to say : Gothic fairgunni "mountain (covered with oaks)", Anglo-Saxon firgen- "mountain wood", Old High German Fergunna, Virgundia waldus, etc.
- French place names derived from the forms Perciacum, Percoialum, Percunia, Percetum, Erciacum, etc.

== Location ==
Ancient sources tell of a place named Aquae Quarquernae. Alternate names are Aquis Querquennis and Aquis Cercennis.

== Relations to other tribes ==
The Quaquerni were a subdivision of the Gallaeci Bracarii.

== See also ==
- Pre-Roman peoples of the Iberian Peninsula

== Bibliography ==
- [Querquerni https://www.lexilogos.com/latin/gaffiot.php?p=1296] in: Gaffiot, Félix (1934) Dictionnaire Illustré Latin-Français. Hachette.
- Bosch-Gimpera Pedro. Les mouvements celtiques. Essai de reconstitution (suite). In: Etudes Celtiques, vol. 6, fascicule 1, 1952. pp. 71–126. [DOI: https://doi.org/10.3406/ecelt.1952.1248]; www.persee.fr/doc/ecelt_0373-1928_1952_num_6_1_1248
- Bosch-Gimpera, Pedro. Les mouvements celtiques. Essai de reconstitution (suite). In: Etudes Celtiques, vol. 6, fascicule 2, 1953. pp. 328–355. [DOI: https://doi.org/10.3406/ecelt.1953.1265]; www.persee.fr/doc/ecelt_0373-1928_1953_num_6_2_1265
- Broëns, Maurice. L’Onomastique domaniale entre Plateau Central et Garonne au VIIe siècle, d’après les textes (suite). In: Revue Internationale d'Onomastique, 8e année N°4, décembre 1956. pp. 241–265. [DOI: https://doi.org/10.3406/rio.1956.1564] www.persee.fr/doc/rio_0048-8151_1956_num_8_4_1564
- Carnoy, Albert. Le chêne dans la toponymie et la linguistique. In: Revue Internationale d'Onomastique, 10e année N°2, juin 1958. pp. 81–101. [DOI: https://doi.org/10.3406/rio.1958.1615]; www.persee.fr/doc/rio_0048-8151_1958_num_10_2_1615
- Falileyev, Alexander (2007) [1997]. Dictionary of Continental Celtic Place-Names. Aberystwyth University. Entries: Aquae Quarquernae and Quarquerni.
- Guerra, Amilcar. (2005). Povos, cultura e língua no Ocidente Peninsular: uma perspectiva, a partir da toponomástica. Palaeohispánica: Revista sobre lenguas y culturas de la Hispania Antigua, ISSN 1578-5386, Nº. 5, 2005 (Ejemplar dedicado a: Actas del IX coloquio sobre lenguas y culturas paleohispánicas (Barcelona, 20-24 de octubre de 2004)), pp. 793–822.
- Luján Martinez, Eugenio R. (2006) "The Language(s) of the Callaeci," e-Keltoi: Journal of Interdisciplinary Celtic Studies: Vol. 6, Article 16. pp. 715–748. Available at: https://dc.uwm.edu/ekeltoi/vol6/iss1/16
- Moralejo, Juan J. "Labiovelares en material galaico y lusitano". In: Callaica Nomina: Estudios de Onomástica Gallega. Biblioteca Filolóxica Galega. Fundación Pedro Barrié de la Maza, D.L. 2007. pp. 209–243. [originally from: Verba, Anuario Galego de Filoloxía 30 (2003). pp. 33–58]
- Olivares Pedreno, Juan Carlos. Los Ástures del conventus lucensis y el culto al dios Lug en el noroeste de Hispania. In: Dialogues d'histoire ancienne, vol. 36, n°2, 2010. pp. 117–136.[DOI: https://doi.org/10.3406/dha.2010.3234]; www.persee.fr/doc/dha_0755-7256_2010_num_36_2_3234
- Orejas, Almudena et Sastre Prat, Inés. Fiscalité et organisation du territoire dans le Nord-Ouest de la Péninsule Ibérique: civitates, tribut et ager mensura comprehensus. In: Dialogues d'histoire ancienne, vol. 25, n°1, 1999. pp. 159–188. [DOI: https://doi.org/10.3406/dha.1999.1529]; www.persee.fr/doc/dha_0755-7256_1999_num_25_1_1529
- Rivas Fernández, Juan Carlos. "Un nuevo testimonio epigráfico de los quarquerni y otras cuestiones en torno a la civitas de este pueble". In: Boletín Auriensem Tomo 9. 1979. pp. 51–66. ISSN 0210-8445
- Rhys, John. "II. The Celts and the other Aryans of the P and Q Groups". In: Transactions of the Philological SocietyVolume 22, Issue 1. Oxford: Published for the Society by B. Blackwell. 1893 [December, 1891]. pp. 104–131. https://doi.org/10.1111/j.1467-968X.1891.tb00643.x
- Suarez, Plácido. "La estructuración territorial y étnica del Conventus Bracarensis". In: MINIUS. Revista do Departamento de Historia, Arte e Xeografía. Universidade de Vigo. Servizo de Publicacións. Nº X, 2002. pp. 111–134.
