= Castle of Marialva =

Castle in Mêda, Guarda, Portugal

Coordinates: 40.914°N 7.232°W

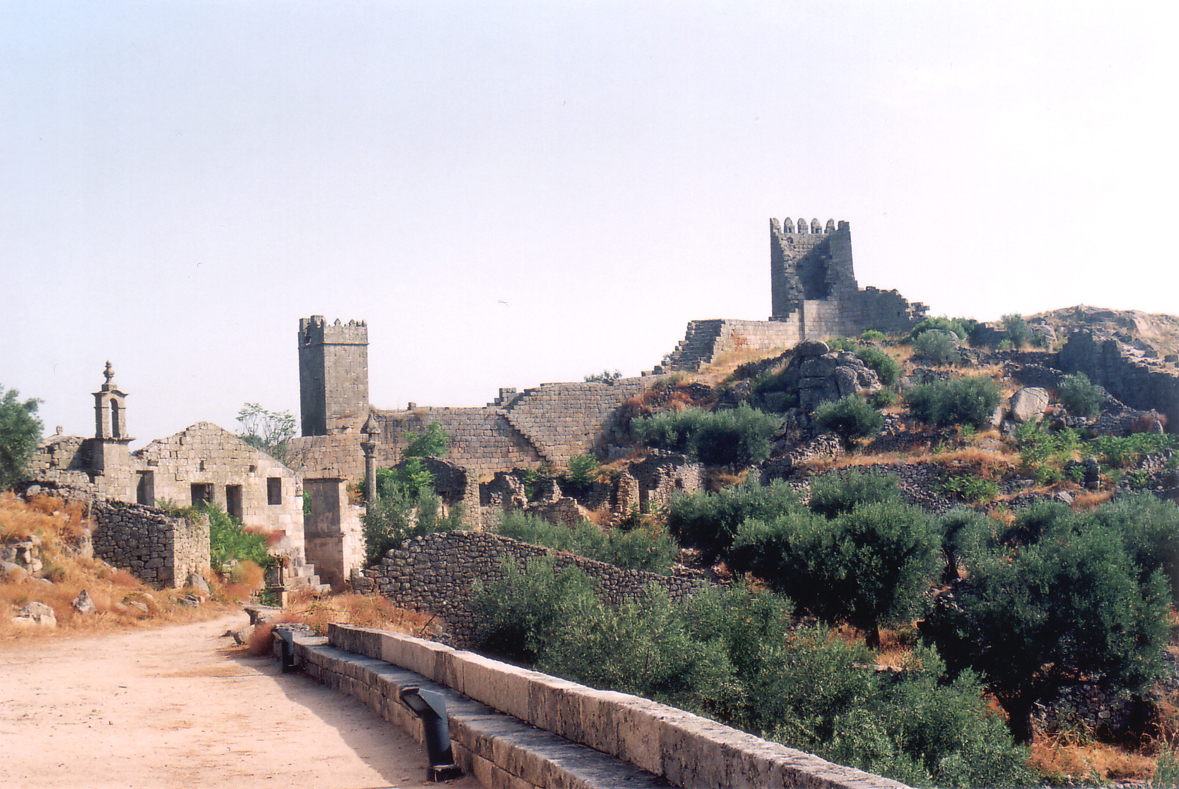
Marialva Castle.

The Castle of Marialva (Portuguese: Castelo de Marialva) is a Portuguese castle in Mêda, Guarda. It has been listed as a National monument since 1978.
