= Cesuras =

Concello de Cesuras
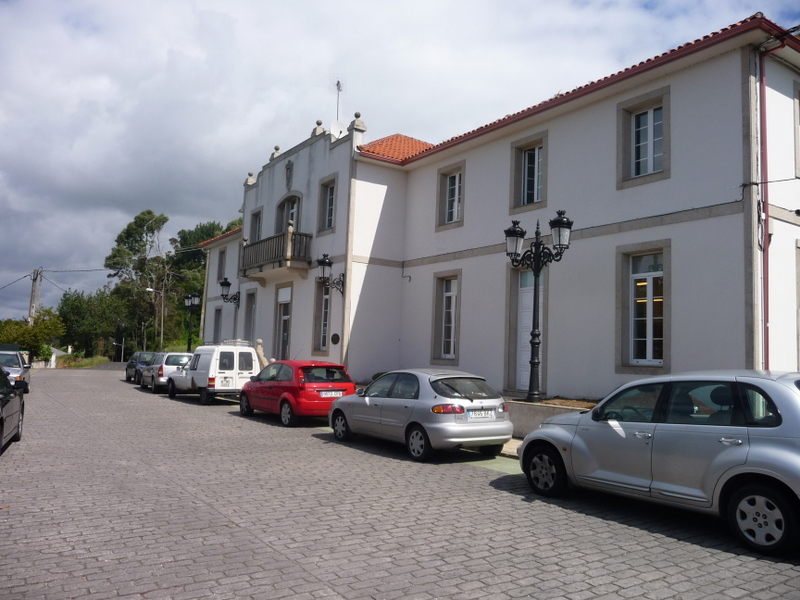

- Seal
- Nickname: Cesuras
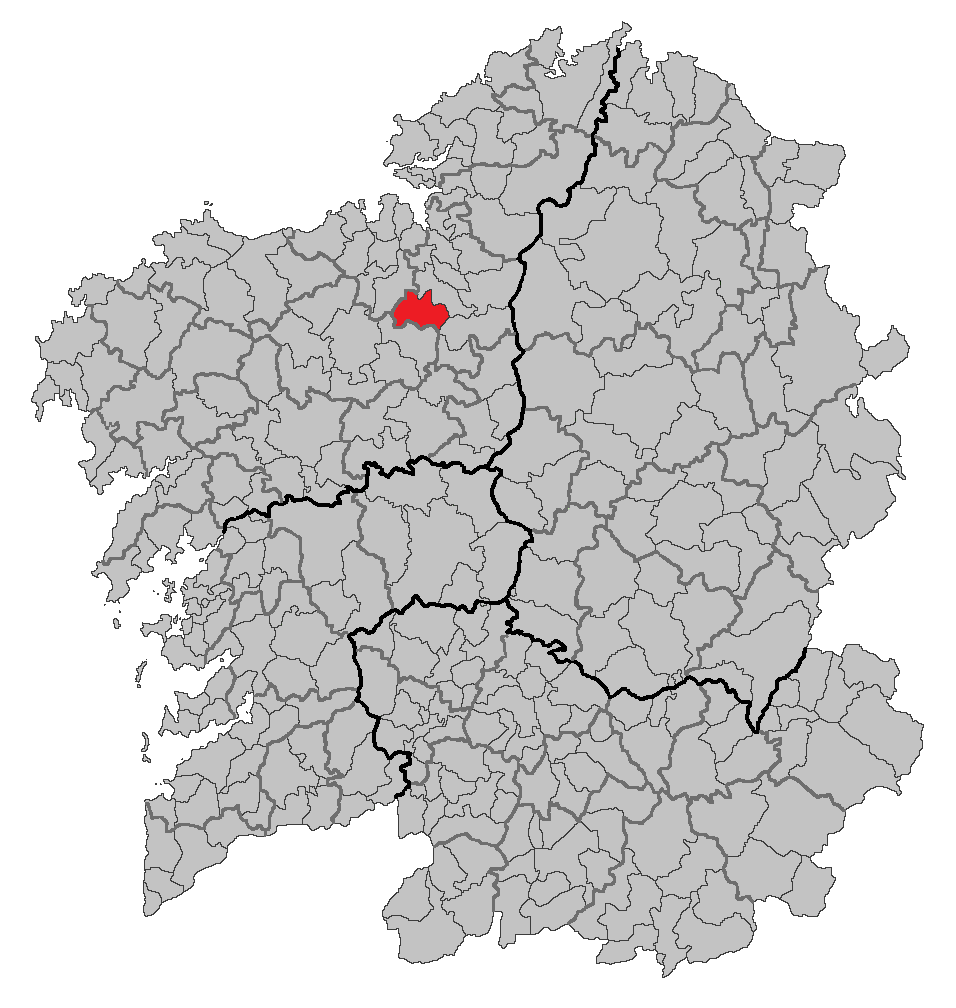
- Location of Cesuras within Galicia
- Coordinates: 43°10′N 8°12′W
- Country: Spain
- Autonomous community: Galicia
- Province: A Coruña
- Comarca: Betanzos

Area
  - Total: 79.56 km^{2} (30.72 sq mi)

Population (2004)
  - Total: 2,463
  - Density: 30.96/km^{2} (80.2/sq mi)
- Time zone: UTC+1 (CET)
  - Summer (DST): UTC+2 (CEST)

Cesuras was a municipality of northwestern Spain in the province of A Coruña, in the autonomous community of Galicia. It is located in the comarca of Betanzos. On June 6, 2013, the Xunta de Galicia government approved the decree the merger of the municipality with Oza dos Ríos, which created the Oza-Cesuras municipality.

== See also ==
- List of municipalities in A Coruña
