= List of Celtic place names in Italy =

The Celtic toponymy of Italy are the place names that, through the reconstruction of the historical and linguistic origin, are attributed to language of Celts allocated once in Italy, between the northern regions and in some areas of central Italy.

It deals with linguistic varieties of "fragmentary attestation " from two strands of Celtic peoples: 1) the oldest, perhaps already settled in the Bronze Age, the ancestors of the Celts of Golasecca culture, who spoke a language (the so-called Lepontic language) which is more archaic, more conservative Gaulish language; 2) groups of Gauls that penetrated in Italy in the fourth century BC (and probably also in earlier stages) .

== Groups and categories of place names ==
Small Celtic lexicon
ambe- ‘river’
banna-, benna- ‘tip, top’
-bona ‘foundation’, ‘oppidum’
briga ‘hill’, ‘fortress’
brīva ‘bridge’
cambo- ‘curve, meander’
cumba 'Cavity', 'valley'
dubus, dubis ‘black’
dūno- ‘fortress’, ‘mountain’
duro- 'square, market'
eburo- ‘yew (sacred tree)’
-ialo- ‘glade’
lāno- 'plain' / 'full'
-late ‘swamp’
lindo- ‘liquid’, ‘pool’
mago- ‘field’, ‘market’
nantu-, nanto- ‘valley’, ‘creek’
nemeto- ‘sacred grove’, ‘sanctuary’
-rāte, rātis- ‘wall’, ‘forte’
redo- ‘to ride’, ‘to travel’
rito- ‘woad’
verna, verno, sberna, ‘alder’
vindo- ‘white’, ‘bright’, ‘sacred’

The linguist Giovan Battista Pellegrini (1921-2007), has divided the toponymy of Celtic origin in the four "strands":

1. «those attested since the ancient times»;
2. «attested in medieval times (but attributed with certainty to the Gaulish strand)»;
3. «Predial place names with -acum likely of Gallo-Latin origin»;
4. «derived from names of Celtic origin with installations which may be even recent and therefore of modest historical interest».

The place names in the first group are names that document pre-Roman Celtic settlements, especially Gaulish, or foundations not before the Roman period. Usually found in forms hellenized and/or Latinized, both in morphology (Celtic endings replaced by Greek and Latin ones) and in phonetics and spelling (see for example the case of the name Milan). In many cases, we have received more variants of those ancient place names. Everything depends on whether they are mentioned by Greek and Latin authors (who in quoting or copy second hand may have altered some names), or used in other written sources, mostly inscriptions and routes, that of Celtic names report either adaptations (and alterations) operated by different Latin speakers or those adopted by the Roman state, in its different parts and historical phases.

The second group includes those place names which, attested in forms transmitted from medieval documents, while not appearing in Greek-Latin inscriptions or authors, can be attributed equally to the Gauls or the Gallo-Romans, so attesting their allocation in ancient times. They are of more ancient formation than the names of the fourth strand (microtoponyms) and may be also than the names of the third one(predials).

The third group includes Gallo-Roman land (rustic names of terrains) or predial toponyms, formed by an ancient anthroponym (but not always Celtic) and one of the Gaulish suffixes -ācum, -āca, -īcum, -īca. It is a group that was productive in the early Middle Ages too, when predials with Celtic suffix from Germanic anthroponyms were born. They may be associated with place names consisting of an ancient Celtic anthroponym + suffix -ate, probably from an ancient -ates, with the value of ‘the men or the relatives and descendants of’ (home of a race or family). This especially where -ate, or sometimes -ato, They may have replaced an older Celtic predial suffix; for example in the case of Lovernato: *Lovernaco (vico Luernaco, attested in 807), from personal name *Louernus (Louernius or Louernacus) < louernos ‘fox’.

The fourth group is the largest. It consists usually of microtoponyms, that is, names of smaller towns, cadastral units, ecc., derived from common words (appellatives) of Celtic or rather Celtic-Latin origin; names that can be found in most topographic maps rather than in road atlases (for example, the Lombard Broletti, from Gaulish *brogilos ‘orchard’). In his articles Pellegrini lists several appellatives that are derived from these toponyms: «beccus, betulla, broga, brogilos, brūcus, cumbo, *camminus, cumba, *glasina, *lanca, ligita, nantu, *pettia, *rica, *tamisium, *tegia, verna ecc.», ambli and *barros.

The membership to these groups will be indicated at the end of each entry with, respectively, the following groups of symbols: [I], [II], [III], [IV].

Like all toponyms, even the Celtic ones can be divided in categories:

- names of rivers [for example: Rhine, from Gaulish *rēno- ‘river’ (‘to flow’, ‘billow’)];
- names of lakes (Benaco, from Celtic *Bennacos ‘horned’);
- names of mountains (Pennine Alps, from Celtic *pennos ‘peak’);
- names of cities and other settlements (Milan, from Latinized Gaulish Mediolanum ‘middle plain’/‘center of perfection’);
- names of regions (Cadore, from Latinized Gaulish *catubri(g)um ‘stronghold’).

== List of rivers ==
Many rivers preserve old Celtic and pre-Roman Indo-European names, most notably larger ones:

- Agogna: A left side tributary of the river Po. To Proto-Celtic *ācu- ‘quick or less likely *āgo- ‘battle, fight’. [I]
- Ambièz, Val e Cima d’A. (Brenta group, Tn). See also → Omblaréi.
- Ambria: A left side tributary of the river Po. To Proto-Celtic *ambe- 'river'.
- Ambriola (Costa di Serina, Bg). → Ambria.
- Artanavaz (Ao). See also → Artogne and Artegna.
- Artogna (Vc). River of Valsesia. See also → Artogne and Artogna.
- Aventia (Massa Carrara). Present Carrione. See also → Avenza.
- Avisio (Tn). → A left tributary of the Adige. To Gaulish *abīsio- / *apīsio- ‘Stream’. See also → Venzone [II]
- Baganza (Pr). Stream which flows through the Province of Parma. To Proto-Celtic *bagos ‘oak’ or Gaulish *bāgos ‘beech’. [II]
- Bardello (Va). → Bardello.
- Bealèra (To). A left side tributary of the river Po. To Gaulish *bedo- ‘ditch, channel’. [IV]
- Bedesis (Fc, Ra). Present Bidente-Ronco. To Gaulish *bedo- ‘ditch, channel’. [I]
- Bevera (Lc, Co). Stream of Brianza. → Bévera.
- Bevera (Va). A tributary of the river Olona. → Bévera. [II]
- Bévéra. A river of southeastern France and northwestern Italy. To Gaulish bebros, bebrus ‘beaver’. See also → Bévera.
- Bitto (So). A tributary of the river Adda. To Gaulish bitu- ‘living world’. See also → Bittelus.
- Boacias (Sp). Present river Vara. To Gaulish *bou-, *bouo- ‘ox, cow’. [I]
- Boesio (Va). A river which flows in the Lake Maggiore. To Gaulish *bou-, *bouo- ‘ox, cow’.
- Boggia (So). Stream of Val Bodengo. To Celtic 'Bodius' [< gaulish bodio- < badio- ‘yellow, blond’] or gaulish bogio- ‘breaker’.
- Bondai (Tn). A tributary of the river Sarca. To Gaulish bunda ‘ground, bottom’. See also → Bondo.
- Bondione (Valbondione, Bg). A tributary of the river Serio. To Gaulish bunda ‘ground, bottom’. See also → Bondo.
- Borbera (Al). To Gaulish boruo-, bormo- ‘Hot spring’. See also Bòrmida and Bòrbore. [II]
- Borbore (Cn, At). To Gaulish boruo-, bormo- ‘Hot spring’. See also Bòrmida and Bòrbore. [II]
- Bòrmida. (Cn, At). To Gaulish boruo-, bormo- ‘Hot spring’. See also Bòrmida and Bòrbore. [II]
- Brembilla (Bg). To Celtic *brem- ‘reverberate, roar’. See also → Brembilla.
- Brembo (Bg). To Celtic *brem- ‘reverberate, roar’. [II]
- Brevenna (Ge). To Gaulish bebros, bebrus ‘beaver’. [II]
- Bronda (Cn). To Celtic *bhrendh- ‘to spring, to slide forward’. See also → Bróndolo.
- Burrus (Bz). Present Rienz. To Gaulish burro- ‘swollen’, ‘proud, defiant’. [I]
- Buthier (Ao). A tributary of the Dora Baltea. To Celtic *baut-, *bautio- ‘fence or grid of thorns’. [I]
- Cantogno (To). See also → Cantogno.
- Cherio (Bg). See also → Chero.
- Chero (Pc). See also → Chieri.
- Chiamogna (To). To Gaulish personal name Camus or Cam(m)ius. See also → Chiamuzzacco.
- Chiese. A left side tributary of the river Po. To Gaulish personal name Cleus, Cleusius.
- Comba dei Carboneri (To). See also → Comba Liussa. [IV]
- Comba Liussa (To). To Gaulish cumba ‘cavity, valley’. [IV]
- Comberanea (Ge). Present rio Rizzolo. To Gaulish *com-bero- ‘river dam’ e ‘confluence’. [I]
- Comboè (Ao). To Gaulish cumba ‘cavity, valley’. [IV]
- Croesio (Cn). See also → Croesio.
- Dolo (Re, Mo). To Gaulish dulio-, dulli- ‘leaf’
- Dora Baltea. See also → Buthier. [I]
- Dorba (Pc). To Gaulish dubra ‘waters’.
- Dorbida (Pc). To Gaulish dubra ‘waters’.
- Dòrbora (Ge). To Gaulish dubra ‘waters’. See also → Dorba.
- Dòrbora (Pr). To Gaulish dubra ‘waters’. See also → Dorba.
- Elva (Cn). A left side tributary of the river Maira. See also → Elvo.
- Elvo (Bi). A left side tributary of the river Cervo. To Lepontic elvu ‘pine’. [I]
- Gabellus. Present Secchia. To Gaulish gablo- ‘fork’. See also → Gavello and Trigáboloi. [I]
- Gambasca (Cn). To Gaulish *cambo- ‘curved ',' curve, meander’ . [II]

== List of cities ==
- Gallese (VT)
- Galleto (TR)
- Lugnola (RI)
- Morgnano (PG)

== See also ==
- Celtic toponymy
- Lepontic language
- Gaulish language
- Celtic languages
- Toponymy
