= Oza dos Ríos =

- municipality
- Seal

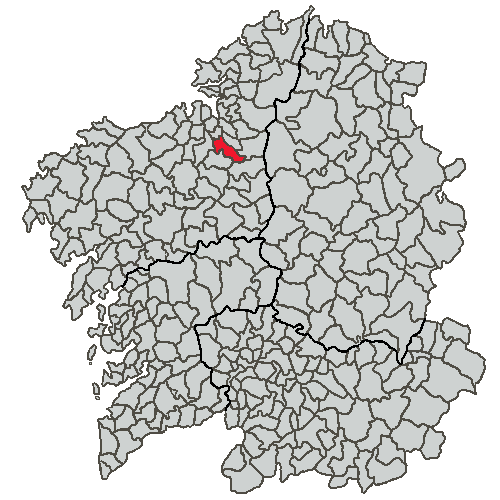
- Situation of Oza dos Ríos within Galicia
- Coordinates: 43°13′0″N 8°10′59″W

Area
  - Total: 71.9 km^{2} (27.8 sq mi)

Population (2005)
  - Total: 3,163
  - Density: 43.99/km^{2} (113.9/sq mi)
- Website: http://www.ozadosrios.es

Oza dos Ríos was a municipality in the province of A Coruña in the autonomous community of Galicia in northwestern Spain. It belongs to the comarca of Betanzos. On June 6, 2013, the Xunta de Galicia government approved the decree the merger of the municipality with Cesuras, which created the Oza-Cesuras municipality.

== See also ==
List of municipalities in A Coruña
