= Portus Cale =

Ancient town and port in current-day northern Portugal

Coordinates: 41°08′N 8°37′W

Portus Cale was an ancient town and port in present-day northern Portugal, in the area of today's Porto and Vila Nova de Gaia. The name of the town eventually influenced the name of the subsequent country of Portugal, from the 9th century onwards.

== Early history ==
Cale was an early settlement located at the mouth of the Douro River, which flows into the Atlantic Ocean in the north of what is now Portugal. The Roman general Decimus Junius Brutus Callaicus conquered the region and founded the Roman city Portus Cale in around 136 BC.

At the end of Brutus's campaigns, Rome controlled the territory between the Douro and Minho rivers plus probable extensions along the coast and in the interior. It was only under Augustus, however, at the end of the 1st century BC, that present north Portugal and Galicia were fully pacified and under Roman control. During the Roman occupation, the city developed as an important commercial port, primarily in the trade between Olisipo (the modern Lisbon) and Bracara Augusta (the modern Braga).

As the Roman Empire declined, these regions fell under Suebi dominion, between 410 and 584. These Germanic invaders settled mainly in the areas of Braga (Bracara Augusta), Porto (Portus Cale), Lugo (Lucus Augusti) and Astorga (Asturica Augusta). Bracara Augusta, capital of Roman Gallaecia, became the capital of the Suebi. As trade collapsed, Portus Cale went into decline.

Another Germanic people, the Visigoths, also invaded the Iberian Peninsula and would eventually conquer the Suebi kingdom in 584. The region around Cale became known by the Visigoths as Portucale. Portus Cale would fall under the Moorish invasion of the Iberian Peninsula in 711.

In 868, Vímara Peres, a Christian warlord from Gallaecia and a vassal of the King of Asturias, Léon and Galicia, Alfonso III, was sent to reconquer and secure from the Moors the area from the Minho River to the Douro River, including the city of Portus Cale, and founded the First County of Portugal or Condado de Portucale. Portus Cale is thus the former name of current-day Porto and Vila Nova de Gaia's riverside area, that would be used to name the whole region and, later, the country.

== Origin of Portugal's name ==
The mainstream explanation for the name is that it is an ethnonym derived from the Castro people, also known as the Callaeci, Gallaeci or Gallaecia, a people who occupied the north-west of the Iberian Peninsula. Cala was the name of a Celtic goddess – in Scotland she is also known as Beira, Queen of Winter – and at the time the land of a specific people was frequently named after its deity. The names Callaici and Cale are the origin of today's Gaia, Galicia, and the -gal in Portugal. The meaning of Cale or Calle is likely a derivation of the Celtic word for port which would confirm very old links to pre-Roman, Celtic languages. Compare today's Irish caladh or Scottish cala, both meaning "port", but considered by most etymological studies as a derivation from Late Latin calatum compare Italian calata / cala, French cale, itself from Occitan cala "cove, small harbour" from a Pre-Indo-European root *kal / *cala (see calanque, chalet, etc.).

The medieval Scottish historian Hector Boece thought the name Portugal was derived from Porto Gatelli, the name Gatelo gave to Braga when he settled there, while others say he gave it to Porto.

Other historians have argued that Greeks were the first to settle Cale and that the name derives from the Greek word Καλλις kallis, 'beautiful', referring to the beauty of the Douro valley. Others have hypothesized that the word Cale came from the Latin word for 'warm' (Portus Cale thus meaning 'warm port').

Portugal's name derives from the Roman name Portus Cale. Portucale evolved into Portugale during the 7th and 8th centuries, and by the 9th century, Portugale was used extensively to refer to the region between the rivers Douro and Minho, the Minho flowing along what would become the northern border between Portugal and Galicia.

== See also ==
- Gallaecia
- Casa do Infante
- History of Portugal
- Porto
- Vila Nova de Gaia
