= Gallaecia =

Roman province in the northwest Iberian Peninsula

Gallacia Gallaecia (Latin)
- Province of the Roman Empire
- AD 298-AD 409
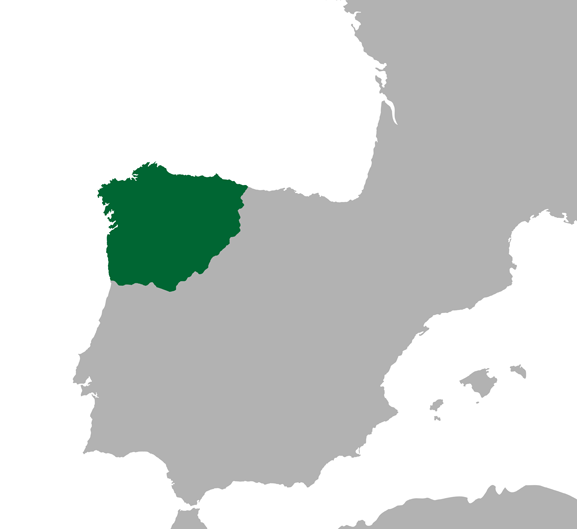
- Capital: Bracara Augusta (Braga)
- Demonym: Gallaecian
- Historical era: Late antiquity
  - Reform of Diocletian: c. AD 298
  - Conquest by the King Leovigild of the Visigothic Kingdom: c. AD 409
  - Conquered by Arabs: c. AD 711
Preceded by	Succeeded by
Hispania Tarraconensis	Kingdom of the Suebi
- Today part of: Northern Portugal, Northeastern Spain (Asturias, Castile and León, Galicia)

Gallaecia, originally known as Callaecia, was the name of a Roman province in the northwest of Hispania, approximately present-day Galicia, northern Portugal, Asturias and León, and the later Suevic and medieval kingdom of Gallaecia. The Roman cities included Auria (Ourense), the port of Cale (Porto), and the governing centers Lucus Augusti (Lugo), Bracara Augusta (Braga), and Asturica Augusta (Astorga), together with their administrative areas: Conventus Lucensis, Conventus Bracarensis, and Conventus Asturicensis, respectively.

== Description ==
The Romans named the northwest part of Hispania or the Iberian Peninsula Callaecia after the Celtic tribes of the area, the Callaeci or Callaecians.

The Gallaic make their entry into written history in the first-century epic Punica of Silius Italicus on the First Punic War:

Fibrarum et pennae divinarumque sagacem

flammarum misit dives Callaecia pubem,

barbara nunc patriis ululantem carmina linguis,

nunc pedis alterno percussa verbere terra,

ad numerum resonas gaudentem plaudere caetras. (Book III pp. 344–347)

"Rich Callaecia sent its youths, wise in the knowledge of divination by the entrails of beasts, by feathers and flames—who, now crying out the barbarian song of their native tongue, now alternately stamping the ground in their rhythmic dances until the ground rang, and accompanying the playing with sonorous caetrae" (a caetra was a small type of shield used in the region).

Callaecia, as a region, was thus marked for the Romans as much for the Callaeci's castros, a system of hillforts, as it was for the lure of its gold mines. This culture extended over present-day Galicia, the north of Portugal, the western part of Asturias, the Bierzo, and Sanabria and was distinct from the neighbouring Lusitanian culture to the south according to the classical authors Pomponius Mela and Pliny the Elder.

== History ==
=== Pre-Roman Callaecia ===
Strabo in his Geography lists the people of the northwestern Atlantic coast of Iberia as follows:

... then the Vettonians and the Vaccaeans, through whose territory the Durius [Douro] River flows, which affords a crossing at Acutia, a city of the Vaccaeans; and last, the Callaicans, [Gallaicans] who occupy a very considerable part of the mountainous country. For this reason, since they were very hard to fight with, the Callaicans themselves have not only furnished the surname for the man who defeated the Lusitanians [meaning Decimus Junius Brutus Callaicus, Roman general] but they have also brought it about that now, already, most of the Lusitanians are called Callaicans.

=== Roman Callaecia ===
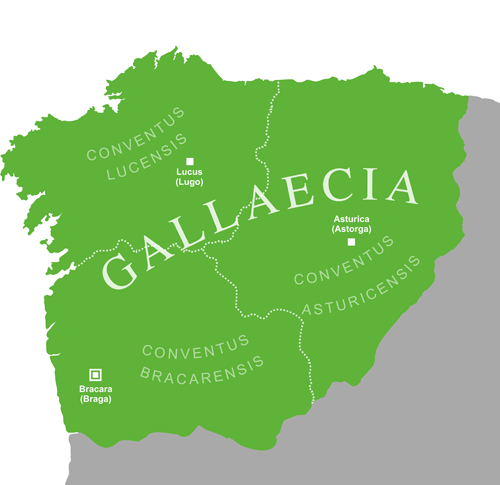
Roman Gallaecia under Diocletian's reorganization, 293 AD

After the Punic Wars, the Romans turned their attention to conquering Hispania. The tribe of the Callaeci 60,000 strong, according to Paulus Orosius, faced the Roman forces in 137 BC in a battle at the river Douro (Spanish: Duero, Portuguese: Douro, Galician: Douro, Latin: Durius), which resulted in a great Roman victory, by virtue of which the Roman proconsul Decimus Junius Brutus returned a hero, receiving the agnomen Callaicus ('conqueror of the Callaicoi', a Callaecian tribe inhabiting the southernmost region of Callaecia by the mouth of the Douro), his campaign followed the Atlantic coast all the way to the river Limia, but no further than the river Miño. This campaign was largely a punitive one, in the context of the aftermath of the Lusitanian wars, as the capital of the Callaici (Portus Cale) was only definitively occupied by Marcus Perpena in 74 BC.

Further incursions in southern Callaecia, included Publius Licinius Crassus's campaign of 96–94 BC.

The first incursion into Northern Callaecia happened in 61 BC, during Julius Caesar's consulship, a largely naval-based campaign across the entire Northern Hispanic coastline, defeating the Callaeci a battle near Brigantium.

The final conquest of Callaecia happened during the Cantabrian Wars, fought under the Emperor Augustus from 26 to 19 BC. The resistance was appalling: collective suicide rather than surrender, mothers who killed their children before committing suicide, crucified prisoners of war who sang triumphant hymns, rebellions of captives who killed their guards and returned home from Gaul.

For Rome, Callaecia was a region formed exclusively by two conventus—the Lucensis and the Bracarensis—and was distinguished clearly from other zones like the Asturica, according to written sources:

- Legatus iuridici to per ASTVRIAE ET CALLAECIAE.
- Procurator ASTVRIAE ET CALLAECIAE.
- Cohors ASTVRVM ET CALLAECORUM.
- Pliny: ASTVRIA ET CALLAECIA

In the 3rd century AD, Diocletian created an administrative division which included the conventus of Callaecia, Asturica, and possibly Cluniense. This province took the name of Callaecia since it was the most populous and important zone within the province. In 409, as Roman control collapsed, the Suebi conquests transformed Roman Callaecia (convents Lucense and Bracarense) into the Kingdom of Galicia (the Galliciense Regnum recorded by Hydatius and Gregory of Tours).

==== Roman governors ====
- Aconius Catullinus Philomatius, praeses before 338

=== Later Gallaecia ===
In later, post-Roman sources, the name Callaecia evolves into Gallaecia and Gallicia.

On the night of 31 December 406 AD, several Germanic barbarian tribes, the Vandals, Alans, and Suebi, swept over the Roman frontier on the Rhine. They advanced south, pillaging Gaul, and crossed the Pyrenees. They set about dividing up the Roman provinces of Carthaginiensis, Tarraconensis, Gallaecia, and Baetica. The Suebi took part of Gallaecia, where they later established a kingdom. After the Vandals and Alans left for North Africa, the Suebi took control of much of the Iberian Peninsula. However, Visigothic campaigns took much of this territory back. The Visigoths emerged victorious in the wars that followed, and eventually annexed Gallaecia.

After the Visigothic defeat and the annexation of much of Hispania by the Moors, a group of Visigothic states survived in the northern mountains, including Gallaecia. In Beatus of Liébana (d. 798), Gallaecia became used to refer to the Christian part of the Iberian Peninsula, whereas Hispania was used for the Muslim one. The emirs, preferring to focus on the task of consolidation of conquered territory, ultimately never expanded into these highly defended mountains, which the Romans before them also had taken generations to incorporate.

In Charlemagne's time, bishops of Gallaecia attended the Council of Frankfurt in 794. During his residence in Aachen, he received embassies from Alfonso II of Gallaecia, according to the Frankish chronicles.

Sancho III of Navarre in 1029 refers to Bermudo III of León as Imperator domus Vermudus in Gallaecia.

== See also ==
- Callaecian language
- Pre-Roman peoples of the Iberian Peninsula
- Kingdom of Galicia
- Timeline of Galician history
- Romanisation of Hispania
- Gaelic

== Bibliography ==
- Alföldy, Géza (2000), Provincia Hispania superior, Heidelberg, ISBN 3-8253-1009-4.
- Coutinhas, José Manuel (2006), Aproximação à identidade etno-cultural dos Callaeci Bracari, Porto.
