= Tremuzo =

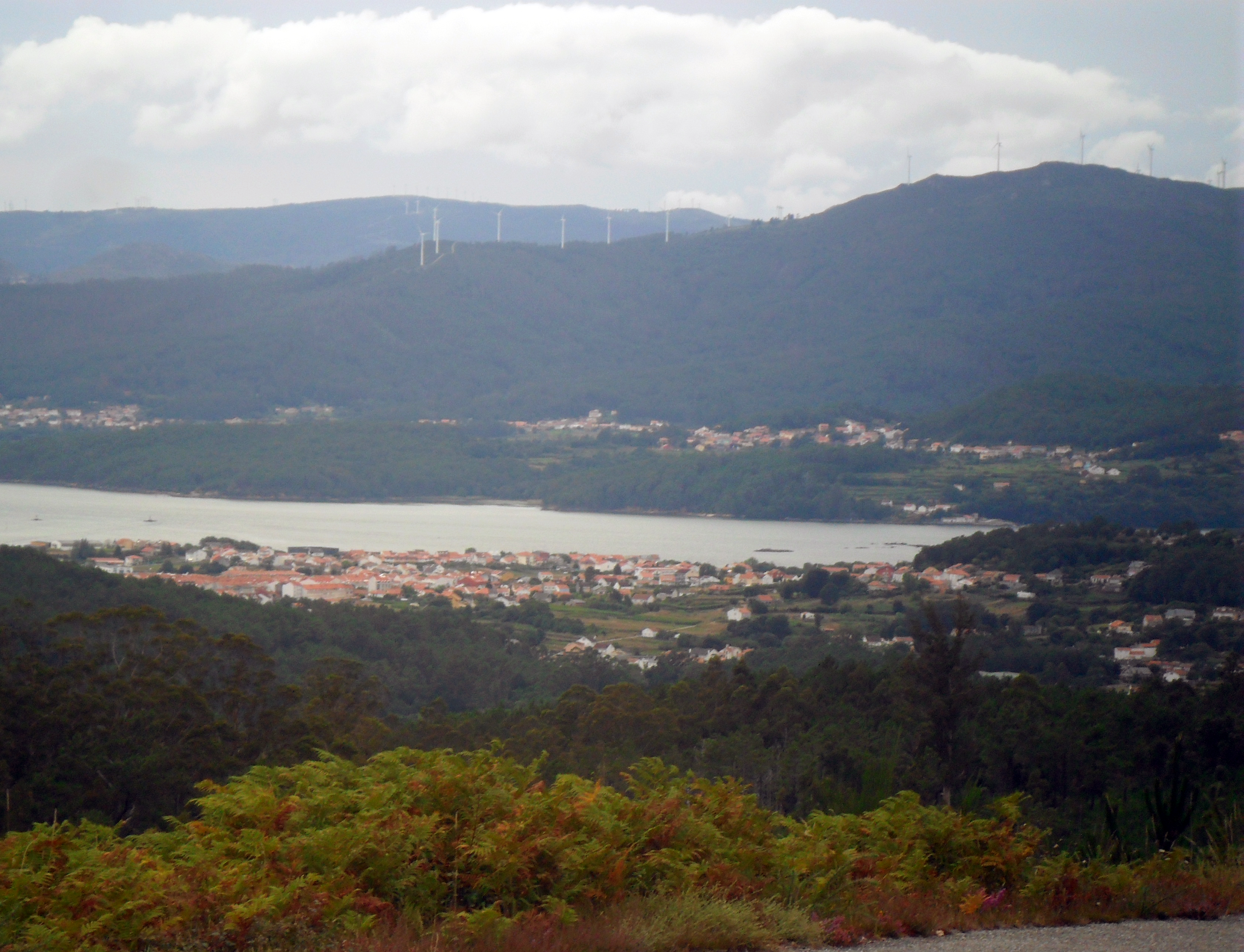

Highest point
- Elevation: 531 m (1,742 ft)
- Coordinates: 42°49′37″N 8°57′12″W

Geography
- Location within Spain
- Location: Galicia, Spain
- Parent range: Galician Massif

Climbing
- Easiest route: mountain hike

Tremuzo is a summit in the mountain range that limits the Galician ria Ría de Muros e Noia to the north and the highest elevation in the municipality of Outes.

It forms the highest elevation close to the sea in that range and therefore offers excellent views to the ria and the Serra da Barbanza mountain range at the other side of the ria.

The summit can be reached as an easy hike or as a mountain-bike tour from Ribeira do Freixo.
