= A Rúa =

- Coat of arms

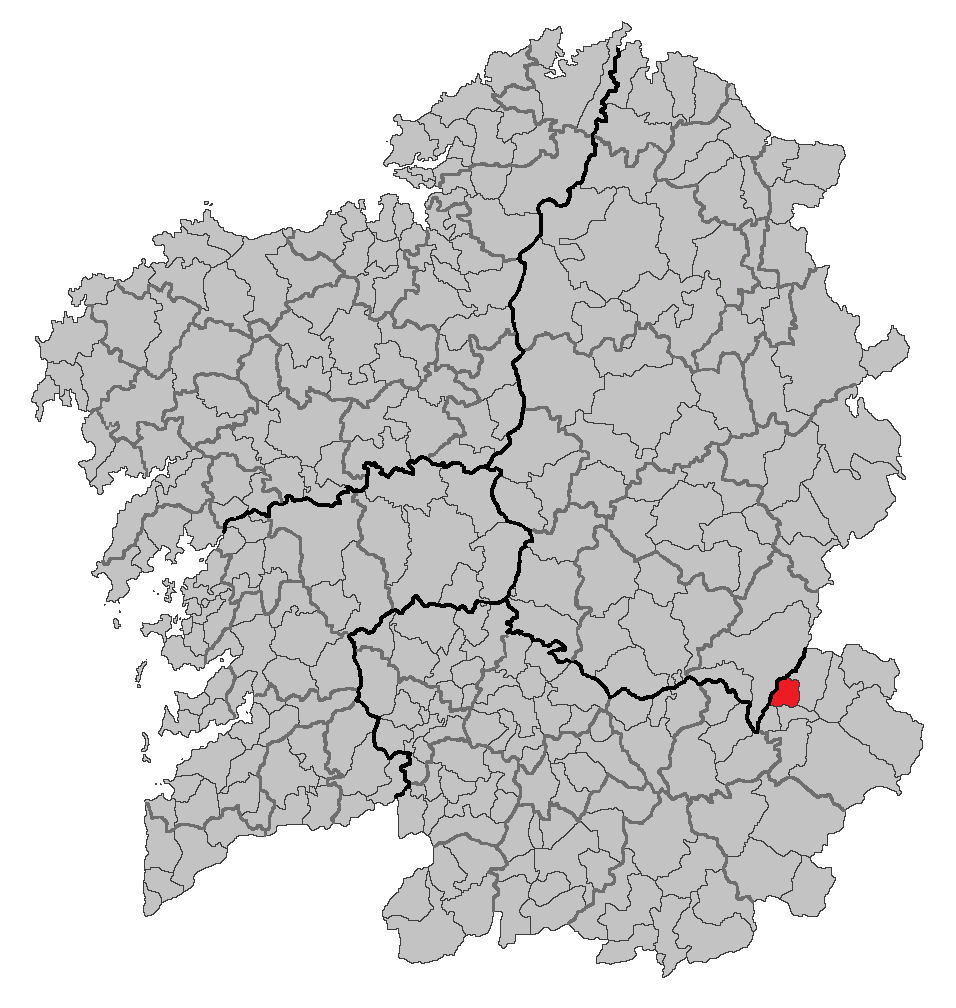

- Location in Spain
- Coordinates: 42°24′N 7°06′W
- Country: Spain
- Autonomous community: Galicia
- Province: Ourense
- Comarca: Valdeorras

Government
  - Mayor: María González Albert (Galician Nationalist Bloc)

Area
  - Total: 35.9 km^{2} (13.9 sq mi)
- Elevation: 317 m (1,040 ft)

Population (2025-01-01)
  - Total: 4,214
  - Density: 117/km^{2} (304/sq mi)
- Time zone: UTC+1 (CET)
  - Summer (DST): UTC+2 (CEST)
- Website: www.arua.es

A Rúa is a mostly rural municipality in the province of Ourense, in the autonomous community of Galicia, Spain. It belongs to the comarca of Valdeorras. It is 101 km (63 mi) from the provincial capital, Ourense. An inhabitant of the area is known as a rués (plural rueses).

It contains three parroquias: A Rúa de Valdeorras, Roblido and San Xulián.

== Geography ==
The municipality of A Rúa is bordered on the north by lugués de Quiroga and in the east by Vilamartín de Valdeorras east, it is part of the Diocese of Astorga. A Rúa is on the northern edge of the Valdeorras valley. The Cereixido hills are on the northern part of the municipality, with Cabeza Porriñas (1.221 m) as its highest point. The river Sil marks the southern boundary of the municipality. The temperate Mediterranean climate is marked by low rainfall and dry summers. Its micro climate and terrain makes the region excellent for viticulture.

== History ==
According to Pliny the Elder, before the arrival of the Romans, A Rúa and the rest of the comarca of Valdeorras was occupied by the Celtiberian Cigurri tribe (also known as the Egurri). The medieval and modern name of the comarca is derived from this tribe meaning "valley of the Cigurri" (Val de Geurres) The Cigurri were part of the Cismontani branch of the Asturian people. They spoke the Celtic Gallaecian language. The Romans under Emperor Augustus invaded in 25 BC leading to the Asturian war which lasted until 19 BC, although there were minor rebellions until 16 BC. Near A Rúa and Petín was the location of the Forum Cigurrorum, the political center of the Cigurri, located on the via Nova (via XVIII) between Bracara Augusta and Asturica Augusta.

After the Germanic invasions, the municipality was part of the Suebic Kingdom and then the Visigothic Kingdom. It was known as Geurres or Giorres and was home to a mint during the reigns of Witteric and Suintila (603–631).

Muslims ruled the region briefly until king Alfonso I of Asturias (739–757) retook the region in the Reconquista. The comarca of Valdeorras was depopulated after its capture by Alfonso I as part of the Desert of the Duero, a buffer zone he created between Asturias and the Muslim states. During the reign of Ordoño I of Asturias (850–866) the re-population of the uninhabited zone began. The people who descended the mountains of the north for the uninhabited valleys were called foramontanos: meaning "out of the mountains." A Rúa, also known as San Esteban de La Rúa during the Middle Ages, was the historical capital of Valdeorras. The region was under the successive rule of the kingdoms of Asturias, Galicia, León, and Castile.

During the Spanish War of Independence, Spanish guerrillas and Napoleon's Grande Armée clashed in the region.

Until the new administrative division of Spain in 1833, Valdeorras was part of the province of El Bierzo, and was considered part of León. Afterwards, it became a comarca of Galicia.

The opening of the Palencia–A Coruña railway line on 1 September 1883 was a decisive moment for the economy of the region.

== Economy ==
Since ancient times Valdeorras has been a wine-producing region due to its climate and position on the river Sil. Its main source of income remains the production of wines and spirits. The identity of the municipality is unequivocally linked to the wine and its multiple warehouses attest to this. Acting as a test of the quality of its wines, in 2011, the renowned winemaker Robert M. Parker's cataloged them among the elite in world of wines.

Although within the municipality there is no mining, many residents of the area are active in the extraction of slate in other municipalities of the district.

Besides wine and slate, other activities that invigorate economic activity in the municipality are power generation, carpentry, goods transportation, hospitality, food, a factory that was recently built, and auxiliary automotive industry.

== Natural and historic heritage ==
Los elementos más relevantes desde el punto de vista turístico, del municipio, son:

- Cigarrosa Bridge, a Roman bridge crossing the Sil river. A Roman villa (Opus figlinum) with baths and inscriptions was excavated near the bridge in 1896. It belonged to a Pompeius Reburro. It connects the town of A Rúa with the town of Petín. Today the bridge is pedestrian.
- Santo Estevo da Rúa Church, constructed in the 16th century. It is one of the most remarkable ecclesiastical buildings of the region.
- Reservoir of Saint Martin river area: On the banks of the river Sil river is a fascinating river ecosystem. On the same pier and extends a riverside walk with leafy poplars and a sports and recreational area.
- The municipality is crossed by a variant of the Camino de Santiago, called Camino de Invierno. It is a shortcut that prevented the ascent to Cebreiro in winter.
