= Geography of Galicia =

Galicia

The geography of Galicia is characterized by the contrast between the low altitude coastal relief and, further inland, by the higher altitude of the Galician Massif which itself offers contrasts between the morphology of the high northern plains and the southern mountains and valleys.

== Limits ==
The territory of Galicia is between 43°47′ N (Estaca de Bares) and 41°49′ N (Portela do Home, border with Portugal) in latitude. In longitude, the territory lies between 6º42′ W and 9º18′ W.

== Coast ==
The Galician coast has 1,500 kilometres (930 mi) and has many incoming and outgoing and small islands, and in general is steep declines or little soft. Alternate locations with different characteristics, as in the Rías Baixas' Corrubedo or the Cantabrian Mariña de Lugo. The first features a coastal dune in a low profile, and the second a high geological deposition zone on its original level. Most of the population lives along the Atlantic estuaries in the major urban centers and their areas of influence. The estuaries are important fisheries, helping the Galician coast be one of the most important fishing areas in the world. They also attract many tourists to the magnificent views and beaches.

=== Capes ===
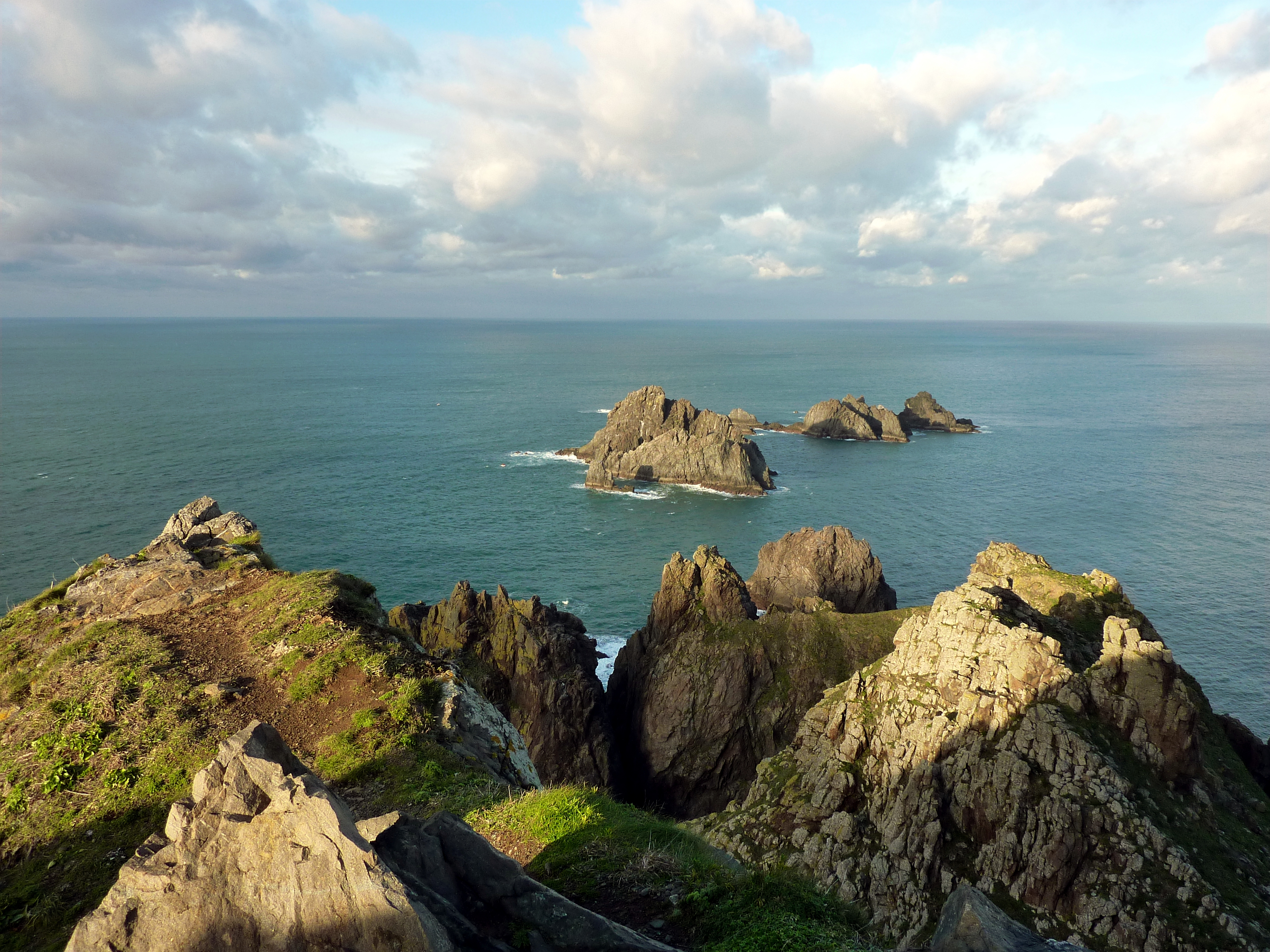
Cape Ortegal

Galician most known capes are:

- Estaca de Bares, which is the northern point in Galicia, and the border between Atlantic Ocean and Cantabrian Sea.
- Cape Ortegal, between Ortiguiera and Teixido's cliffs.
- Cape Prior.
- Santo Adrao Point, close to Malpica.
- Cape Vilan.
- Cape Touriñan, the most occidental point of Galicia.
- Cape Finisterre, known by the Romans as the end of the world point.

=== Islands ===
Galicia's coast is surrounded by islands such as: Cíes Islands (consisting of the island of Faro, Monteagudo and the San Martiño), the islands of Ons (consisting of the island of Ons and Onza), the archipelago Sálvora (comprises the islands of Sálvora, Vionta and Sagres) and other islands as Cortegada, Arousa, the Sisargas, or Malveiras, most of which belong to the National Park of the Atlantic Islands. There are also many smaller islands and islets. It is estimated that on the coast of Galicia there are 316 islands, islets and rocks.

== Mountains ==
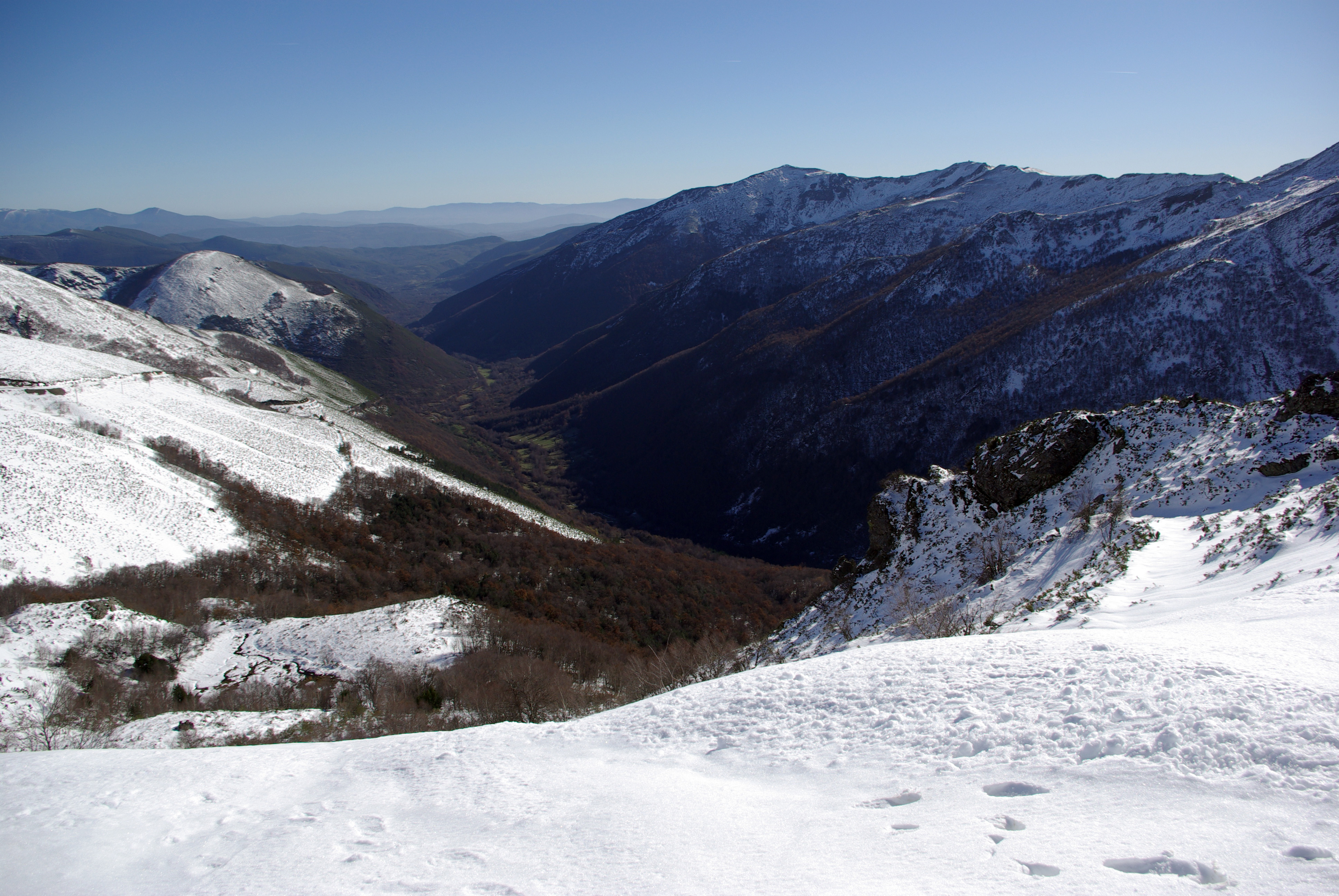
Serra dos Ancares

The main mountain ranges of the Galician Massif are Serra do Eixe, Serra da Lastra and Serra do Courel, located in the eastern parts, bordering with Castile and León. Noteworthy mountain ranges are O Xistral (northern Lugo), the Serra dos Ancares (on the border with León and Asturias), O Courel (on the border with León), O Eixe (the border between Ourense and Zamora), Serra de Queixa (in the center of Ourense province), O Faro (the border between Lugo and Pontevedra), Cova da Serpe (border of Lugo and A Coruña), Montemaior (A Coruña), Montes do Testeiro, Serra do Suído, and Faro de Avión (between Pontevedra and Ourense); and, to the south, A Peneda, O Xurés and O Larouco, all on the border of Ourense and Portugal.
