= Lluís Solà i Sala =

Catalan poet, playwright and translator

- Born: 1940 (age 85–86); Vic, Catalonia
- Writing career
- Language: Catalan
- Genres: Theatre, Poetry

Lluís Solà i Sala (born Vic, Catalonia, 1940) is a Catalan poet, playwright and translator.

As a dramaturge, Lluís Solà has staged works by Strindberg, Aeschylus and Joan Brossa among other authors, and he has also presented his own works. He has stage-directed five of his own plays, and he has directed more than fifty classic and contemporary works, including the play nô Semimaru with scenery by Antoni Tàpies and music by Josep Mestres Quadreny. He has also directed productions from poets such J. V.Foix, Joan Vinyoli and Miquel Bauçà. He founded and directed the Centre Dramàtic d'Osona (Dramatic Center of Osona, Catalonia) and he was a professor at the Institut del Teatre (Theatre Institute) between 1975 and 2005. He was director of the theatrical group La Gàbia de Vic from 1963 to 1979. He has translated foreign authors such Kafka, Rilke, Rimbaud and Pessoa.

He was honoured in the Marxa dels Vigatans in September 2012.

== Published work ==
=== Poetry ===
- Laves, escumes. Barcelona: Lumen, 1975
- L'herba dels ulls. Barcelona: Eumo - Cafè Central, 1993
- De veu en veu : obra poètica I (1960-1999). Barcelona: Proa, 2001 (Winning book of Premi de la Crítica - Poesia Catalana, 2001)
- L'arbre constant: obra poètica II (1994-2000). Barcelona: Proa, 2003
- Entre bellesa i dolor : Obra poètica inèdita. Barcelona: Ed. 62, 2010
- Al llindar de l'ara. Palma de Mallorca: Moll, 2010
Estudis literaris
- La paraula i el món : assaigs sobre poesia. Barcelona: L'Avenç, 2013

== Translations ==
=== From English to Catalan ===
- BECKETT, Samuel. Fi de partida. Released by La Gàbia de Vic, 1979. Barcelona: Diputació Provincial de Barcelona; Institut d'Edicions, 1990.
- GOLDMANN, Lucien,El mètode estructuralista genèric en història de la literatura. Inquietud artística, 36 (1966).
- POUND, Ezra. Retrospecció. Reduccions, 54 (1992).

=== From German to Catalan ===
- DÜRRENMATT, Friedrich. Grec busca grega. Barcelona: Edicions 62, 1966.
- KAFKA, Franz. El castell. Barcelona: Aymà, 1971.
- HANDKE, Peter. La cavalcada sobre el llac de Constança. Released by La Gàbia de Vic, 1980. Barcelona: Edicions del Mall, 1984.
- PAPPENHEIM, Fritz. L’alienació de l’home modern. Barcelona: Novaterra, 1968. [essay]

=== From Ancient Greek to Catalan ===
- SOFOKLES. Antígona. Verse translation. Released by La Gàbia de Vic, 1963. Unpublished

=== From Japanese to Catalan ===
- ZEAMI. Semimaru. (Indirect translation from French). Premiered at the Aliança del Poble Nou, 1966. Unpublished.

=== From Swedish to Catalan ===
- STRINDBERG, August. El guant negre. Estrenada al Teatre Romea sota la direcció d’Hermann Bonnin, 1981. Unpublished.
