= Trevinca =

Mountain in Spain

Peña Trevinca
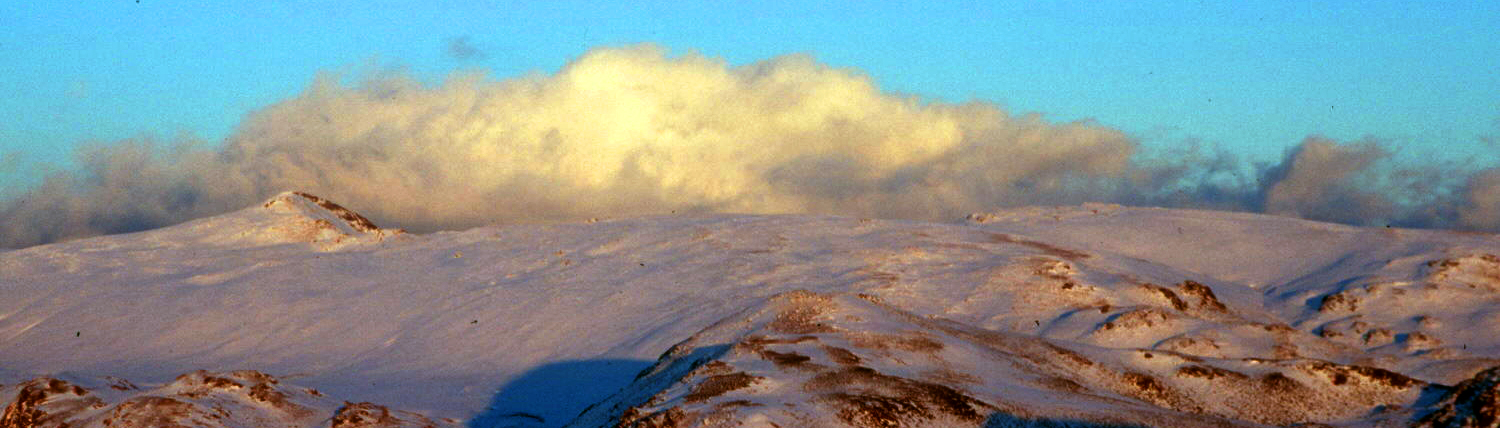
- A view of Peña Trevinca

Highest point
- Elevation: 2,127 m (6,978 ft)
- Coordinates: 42°14′33.6″N 6°47′45.6″W

Geography
- Location within Spain
- Location: Galicia & Castile and León
- Parent range: Galician Massif

Climbing
- First ascent: Unknown
- Easiest route: From Sobradelo or A Veiga on the Galician side, or from Puebla de Sanabria on the Leonese side

Peña Trevinca (Galician: Pena Trevinca), also known as Trevinca, is a mountain in northern Spain. It is located at the confluence of the Montes de León and the Macizo Galaico on the boundary between the autonomous communities of Galicia and Castile and León. It is the highest mountain in Galicia and in the province of Zamora.

The mountain has a 22,510 ha bird-life Special Protection Area.

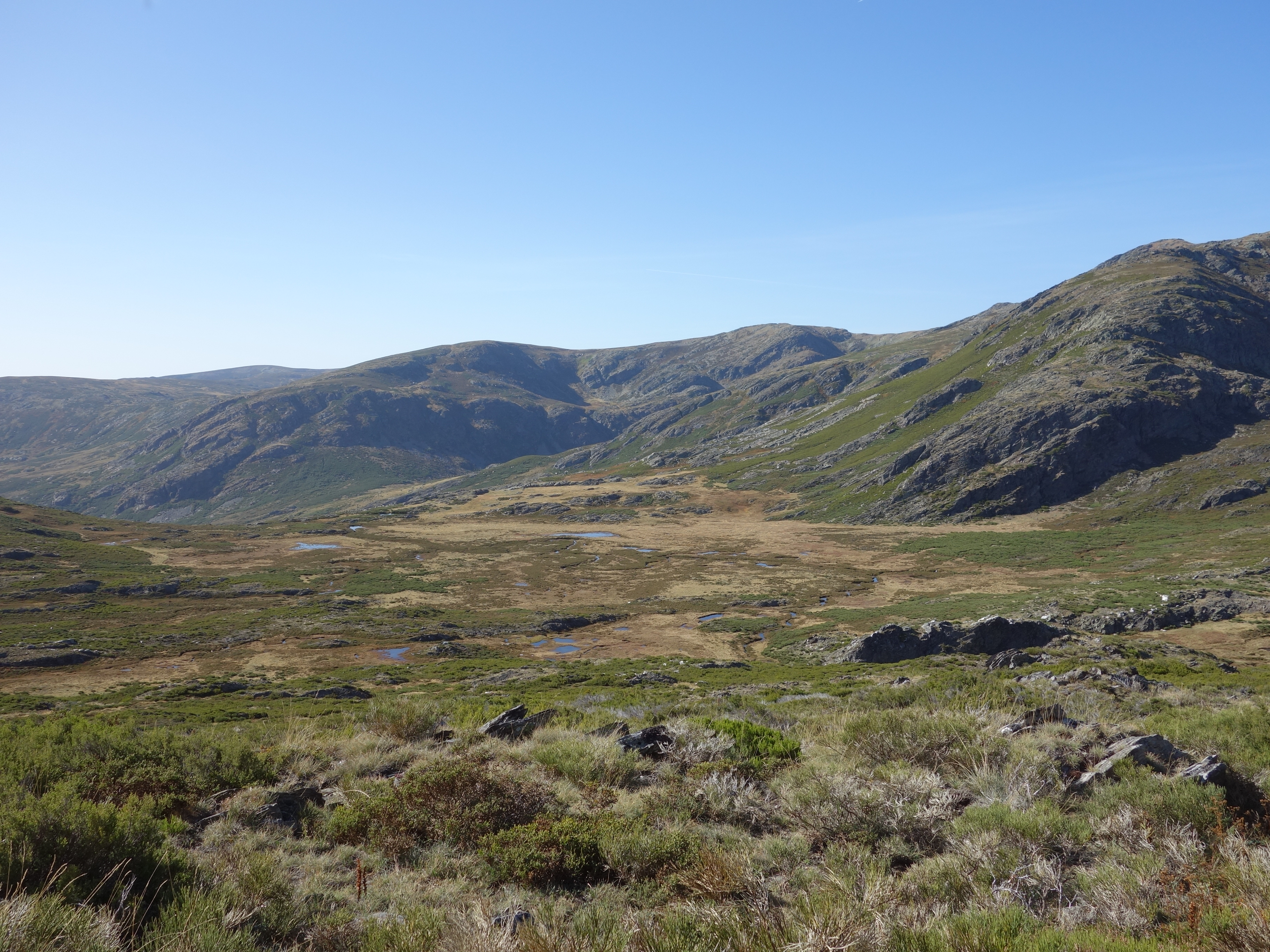

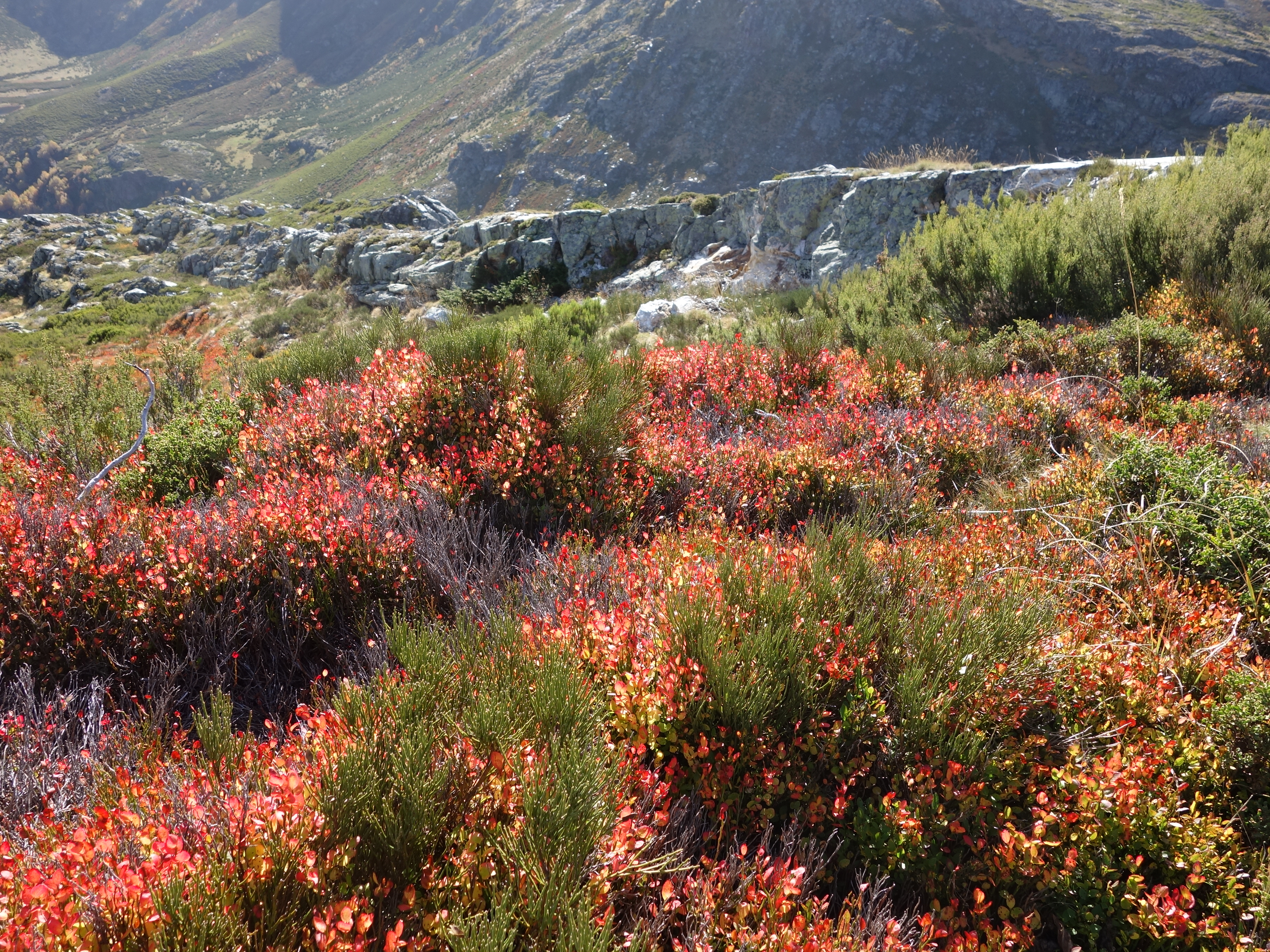

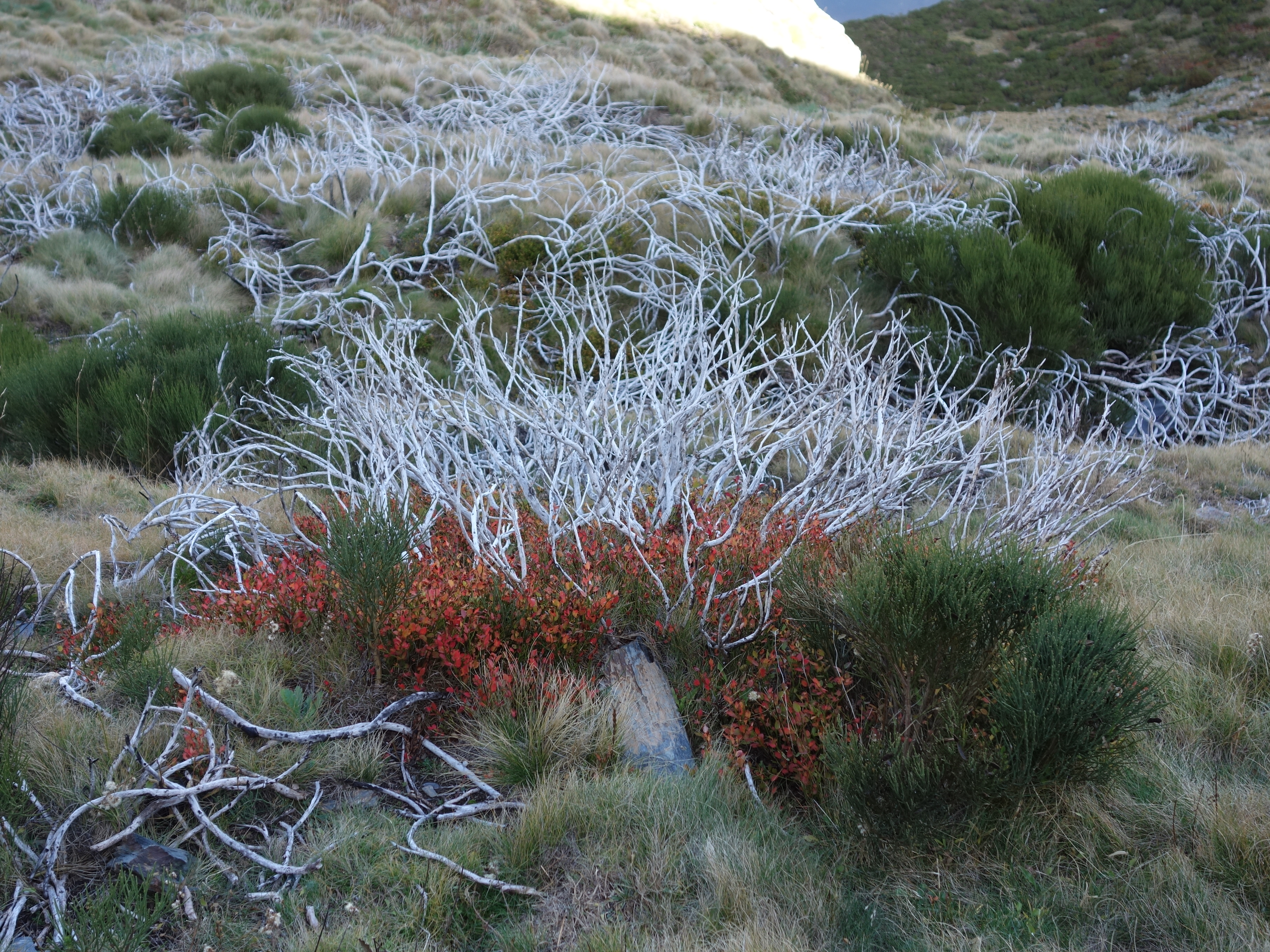

== See also ==
- Serra do Eixe, also known as Sierra Segundera
- Scrambling
