= A Veiga =

- municipality
- Coat of arms

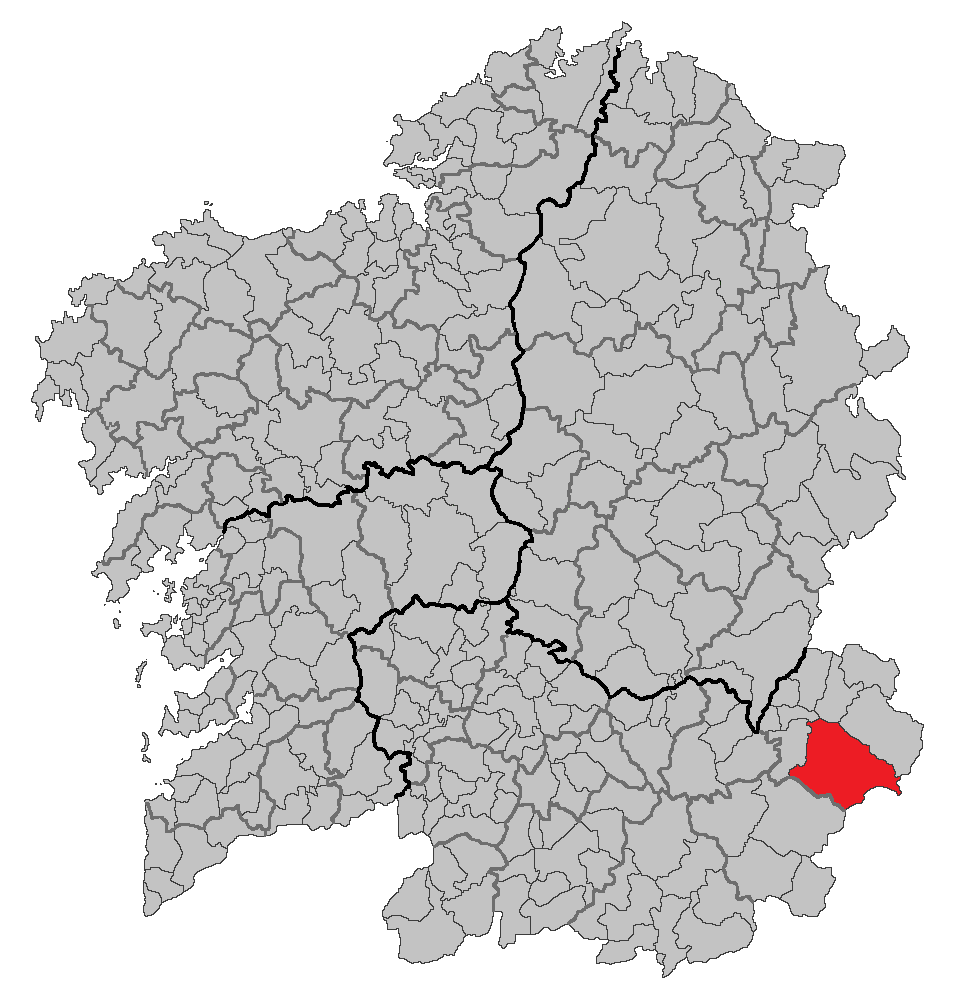
- Location in Galicia

- Location in Spain
- Coordinates: 42°14′59″N 7°01′33″W
- Country: Spain
- Autonomous community: Galicia
- Province: Ourense
- Comarca: Valdeorras

Government
  - Mayor: Juan Anta Rodríguez (People's Party)

Area
  - Total: 72.1 km^{2} (27.8 sq mi)
- Elevation: 884 m (2,900 ft)

Population (2025-01-01)
  - Total: 873
  - Density: 12.1/km^{2} (31.4/sq mi)
- Time zone: UTC+1 (CET)
  - Summer (DST): UTC+2 (CEST)
- Website: www.aveiga.es

A Veiga is a municipality (concello) in the south-east of the province of Ourense in the autonomous community of Galicia, Spain. At 291 km², it is one of the largest concellos in the province. The capital is the town of A Veiga, also known as A Veiga (Santa María) or Santa María da Veiga to distinguish it from other towns and villages in Galicia of the same name (as the parish Church is Santa María). A Veíga is located 150 km from Ourense. The municipality has a population of 1,273 (2005), and a relatively low and decreasing population density (4.37 people/km²).

It is a mountainous area, including the Pena Trevinca, the tallest peak in Galicia at 2124 m. There are 29 parroquias (parishes).

The Prada Reservoir (encoro de Prada) lies in the province. It takes water from the river Xares, a tributary to the river Bibey. The dam was constructed in 1958 and submerged the town of Alberguería on May 9, 1959.

== Parishes ==
- A Veiga (Santa María)
- Baños (San Fiz)
- Candeda (San Miguel)
- Carracedo (San Miguel)
- Casdenodres (San Salvador)
- Castromao (Santa María)
- Castromarigo (San Miguel)
- Corexido (Santo Estevo)
- Corzos (Santiago)
- Curra (San Miguel)
- Hedreira (Santa Comba)
- Espiño (San Vicenzo)
- Lamalonga (Santa María)
- Meda (Santa María)
- Meixide (Santa María)
- Ponte (Santa María Madanela)
- Prada (Santo André). Web & Photos
- Prado (Santo Estevo)
- Pradolongo (San Pedro)
- Requeixo (Santo André)
- Riomao (San Tomé)
- San Fiz (Santa Catarina)
- San Lourenzo (San Lourenzo)
- Santa Cristina (San Tirso)
- Seoane (San Xoán)
- Valdín (Santa María)
- Vilaboa (Santa Lucía)
- Vilanova (San Pedro)
- Xares (Santa María).

There were previously two more, which have since disappeared.

- Oleiros
- Alberguería
