= O Barco de Valdeorras =

- Municipality
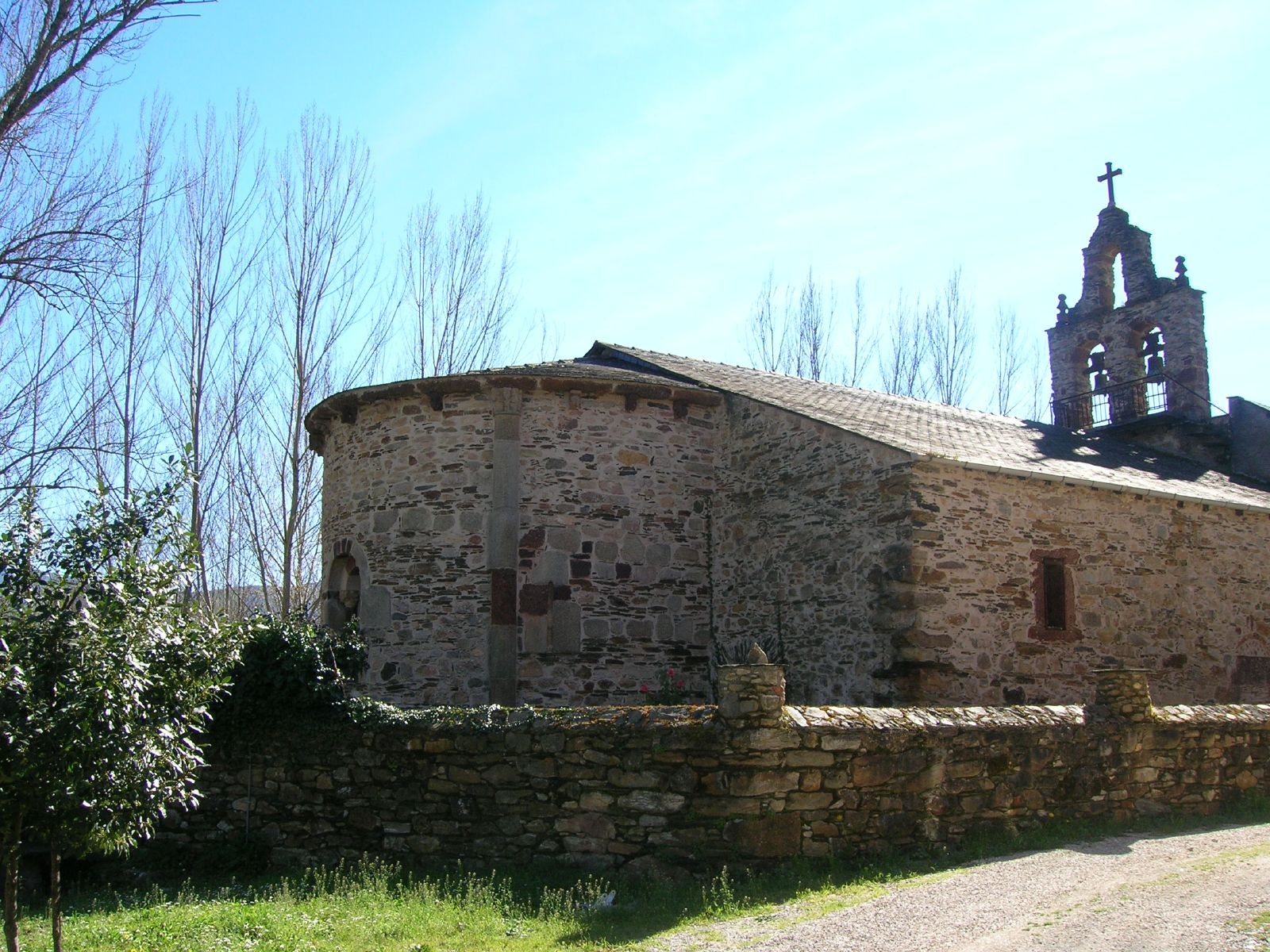
- Monastery of San Miguel de Xagoaza.

- Flag Coat of arms

- Location in Spain
- Coordinates: 42°25′0″N 6°58′59″W
- Country: Spain
- Autonomous Community: Galicia
- Province: Ourense
- Comarca: Valdeorras

Government
  - Mayor: Alfredo Laudelino García Rodríguez (PSOE)

Area
  - Total: 86 km^{2} (33 sq mi)
- Elevation (AMSL): 325 m (1,066 ft)

Population (2025-01-01)
  - Total: 13,368
  - Density: 160/km^{2} (400/sq mi)
- Time zone: UTC+1 (CET)
  - Summer (DST): UTC+2 (CEST (GMT +2))
- Postal code: 32300
- Area code: +34 (Spain) + 988 (Ourense)
- Website: www.concellodobarco.org

O Barco de Valdeorras (in Spanish ''' El Barco de Valdeorras''') is a municipality in the province of Ourense, in the autonomous community of Galicia, Spain. It belongs to the comarca of Valdeorras, serving as its capital. It is located in the Sil valley and lying in the Serra do Eixo. One of its economic foundations, besides mining and slate processing, is wine production, which qualified for the Designation of Origin Valdeorras. Remains of Roman and pre-Roman culture and several stately manor houses are the most important monuments in the town. It is also famous for its wines.

== History ==
In some caves of the Sierra de la Lastra early human remains were found. In other places close to O Barco, Castreño petroglyphs and settlements have been discovered. The Gegurros, one of the 22 villages that were part of Asturican convent, were the ancient inhabitants of this land and the adjective derived from the current name of the region (Val-de-giorres).

Romanization was intense in a strategic area rich in minerals. Among the Médulas and Montefurado are frequent traces of gold mining activity. By passing the Via Nova (XVIII of the Antonine Itinerary) that joined Braga and Astorga, and other secondary platforms, forced the people of these areas to build bridges that are a testament of that time.

In the Middle Ages, the Lordship of Valdeorras was administered by the nobility.
