= Joan Vinyoli =

Catalan poet

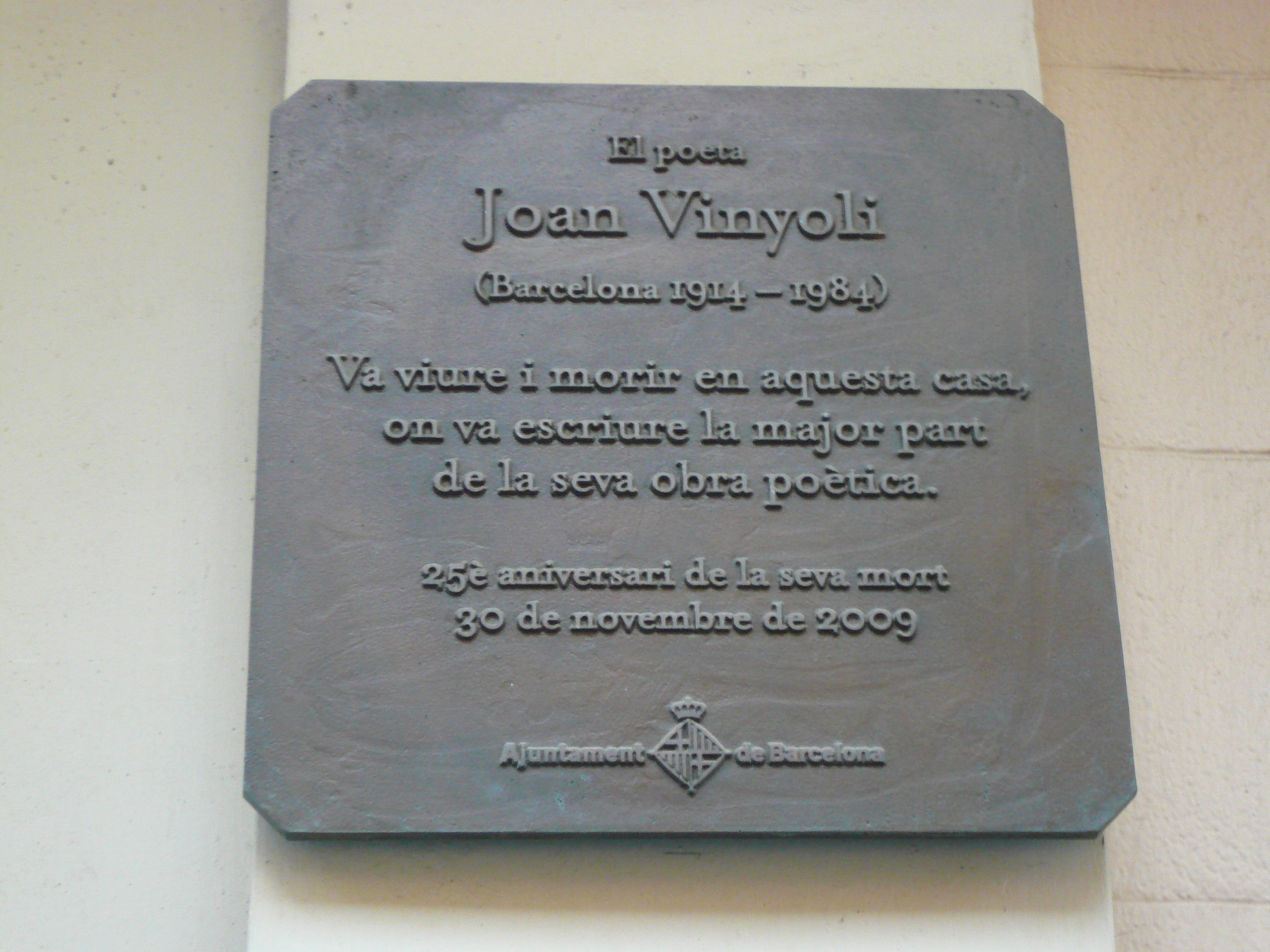
Joan Vinyoli P1430425.JPG

Joan Vinyoli i Pladevall (3 July 1914 — 30 November 1984) was a Catalan poet, born in Barcelona, Spain.

Vinyoli first became familiar with poetry by reading the works of Rainer Maria Rilke and at the beginning of his career was heavily influenced by the work of other German poets such as Goethe and Hölderlin. His talent was first noticed by Carles Riba, and then Rosselló-Pòrcel, Teixidor among others. He published his first collection, Primer desenllaç (First Outcome) in 1937. In the 1970s, after a decade of relative silence, his work changed to a more realistic style. During this period he received widespread public recognition and was awarded the Generalitat of Catalonia Prize, City of Barcelona Prize and the National Prize for Literature. He also published translations of Rilke into Catalan.

The work of Vinyoli is that of a self-taught writer. Initially very much influenced by the poetic language of German symbolism (Hölderlin, Goethe and Rilke, whose verse Vinyoli translated into Catalan), he afterwards leaned more and more towards the sort of realism that is capable of using everyday language to offer a distinctive vision of the human condition. The recurrent subjects of his poetry are love, the fleetingness of time and memory. His meditation is not so much on death -and in this he differs from Espriu- as on mutability: the way in which all things pass away, are lost, and become part of memory.

His father died when he was four years old and his childhood was marked by the straitened economic circumstances of his family and the happiness of the summers he spent in Santa Coloma de Farners, a landscape he frequently evoked in his poetry. He did Business Studies and, at sixteen years of age, began to work in the publishing house Labor, where he occupied different positions until his retirement in 1979.Initially unsure of his vocation and self-taught, Vinyoli conceived of poetry much as Carles Riba did, as a tool of inquiry and self-knowledge, a way of finding about the world and a form of spiritual realisation. His poetry, which was indebted to German Romanticism and post-symbolism progressively evolved towards the metaphysical and existential, to which he added a vein of experiential and moral realism. Poetry was, for Vinyoli, a way of becoming rooted in reality and also of transcending it, and the optimal means of salvation, for overcoming the state of indigence that he believed was inherent to the human condition.

His poetic oeuvre can be divided into two stages. The first, covering the years from 1937 to 1963 in which he remains true to the tutelage of Riba and Rilke, is that of learning and consolidation. It is characterised by constant poetic refocusing and the firm desire to construct his own distinctive poetic voice. He published five collections of poems in this period: Primer desenllaç (First Outcome) (1937), a minor work in which the prevailing theme is the will to produce art in true poetry; De vida i somni (On life and Dreaming) (1948), written according to a new conception of the poetic task as more an "almost religious mystery than a craft"; Les hores retrobades (1951), a book of markedly elegiac tone that inaugurated Vinyoli's stage of consolidation, representing the decisive step away from his initial descriptions of landscapes to the process of symbolisation that would be so characteristic of his later work; and El Callat (1956), which was to be the key work and the most successful of his early period.

In 1963, after seven years of silence, during which, however, he wrote the first version of Llibre d'amic, Joan Vinyoli published Realitats, an irregular and heterogeneous work in which the poet vacillates between remaining true to the poetic postulates that govern the writing of El Callat and taking up the model of realist and engaged poetry that was prevalent at the time in Catalonia.

The second stage, from 1970 to 1984, is that of his maturity and poetic plenitude, coinciding with the point of maximum recognition from critics (with prizes, reviews, poetry readings, etcetera) and public alike. It was also his most fecund period in which he published a total of eleven books of poems besides two collections of poetry, Poesia completa 1937-1975 (Complete Poetry 1937-1975) (1975) and Obra poètica 1975-1979 (Poetry 1975-1979) (1979), and two volumes of translations of Rilke's poetry, Versions de Rilke (Versions of Rilke) (1984) and Noves versions de Rilke (New Versions of Rilke) (1985), which appeared posthumously. Between 1970 and 1975, Vinyoli published the volumes Tot és ara i res (1970), Encara les paraules (1973) and Ara que és tard (1975), which form a unitary triptych in their desolate tone and existentialist approach.

== Works ==
- Primer desenllaç [First Outcome] (1937)
- De vida i somni [On Life and Dreaming] (1948)
- Les hores retrobades [Rediscovered hours] (1951)
- El callat (1956)
- Realitats (1963)
- Tot és ara i res [It is All Now and Nothing] (1970)
- Passeig d'aniversari [Birthday Stroll] (1984)

Translations

- Rainer Maria Rilke,Versions de Rilke (1984)
- Rainer Maria Rilke, Noves versions de Rilke (1985)
