= Cando, Spain =

Village in Galicia, Spain

Cando
- Village
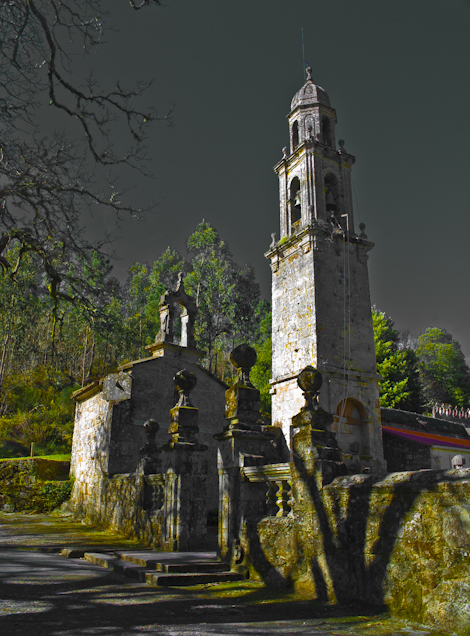

- Location within Galicia
- Coordinates: 42°50′14″N 8°52′06″W
- Country: Spain
- Autonomous community: Galicia
- Province: A Coruña
- Municipality: Outes
- Parish: San Tirso

Population
  - Total: 1,000

Cando (parish of San Tirso) is a village in northwestern Spain, in Outes, province of A Coruña, and the region of Galicia, with a population of around 1000.

It was the location of the observation of a fireball in early 1994, and the subsequent discovery of an explosion site (crater), which has been interpreted by some as being related to UFO activity.

== See also ==
- List of meteor air bursts
- (in Spanish) Bólido de Cando on the Spanish Wikipedia
