= O Bolo =

- municipality
- Coat of arms

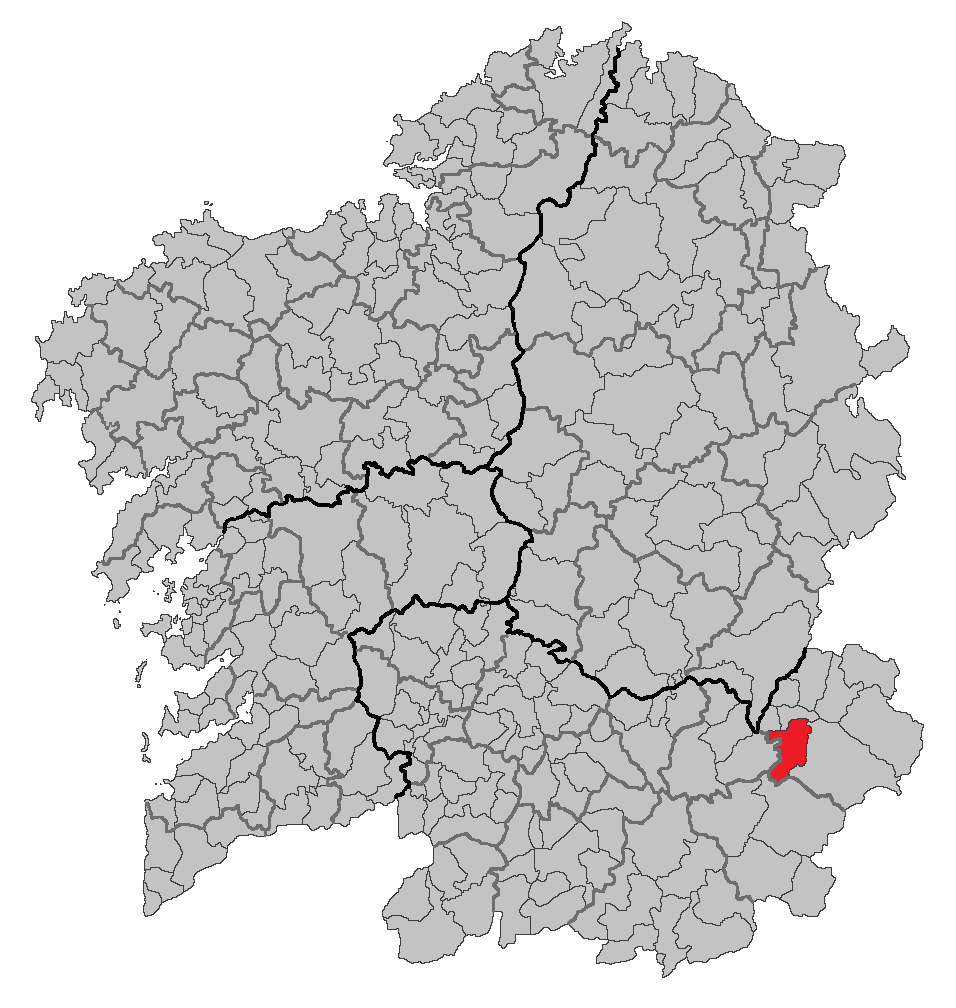
- Location in Galicia

- Location in Spain
- Coordinates: 42°18′24″N 7°05′56″W
- Country: Spain
- Autonomous community: Galicia
- Province: Ourense
- Comarca: Valdeorras

Government
  - Mayor: Manuel Corzo Macías (People's Party)

Area
  - Total: 91.2 km^{2} (35.2 sq mi)
- Elevation: 785 m (2,575 ft)

Population (2025-01-01)
  - Total: 789
  - Density: 8.65/km^{2} (22.4/sq mi)
- Time zone: UTC+1 (CET)
  - Summer (DST): UTC+2 (CEST)
- INE municipality code: 32015
- Website: www.obolo.es

O Bolo is a municipality in the province of Ourense, in the autonomous community of Galicia, Spain. It belongs to the comarca of Valdeorras.
