= Valdeorras =

Coordinates: 42°23′20″N 7°02′50″W

- Comarca
- Flag Coat of arms
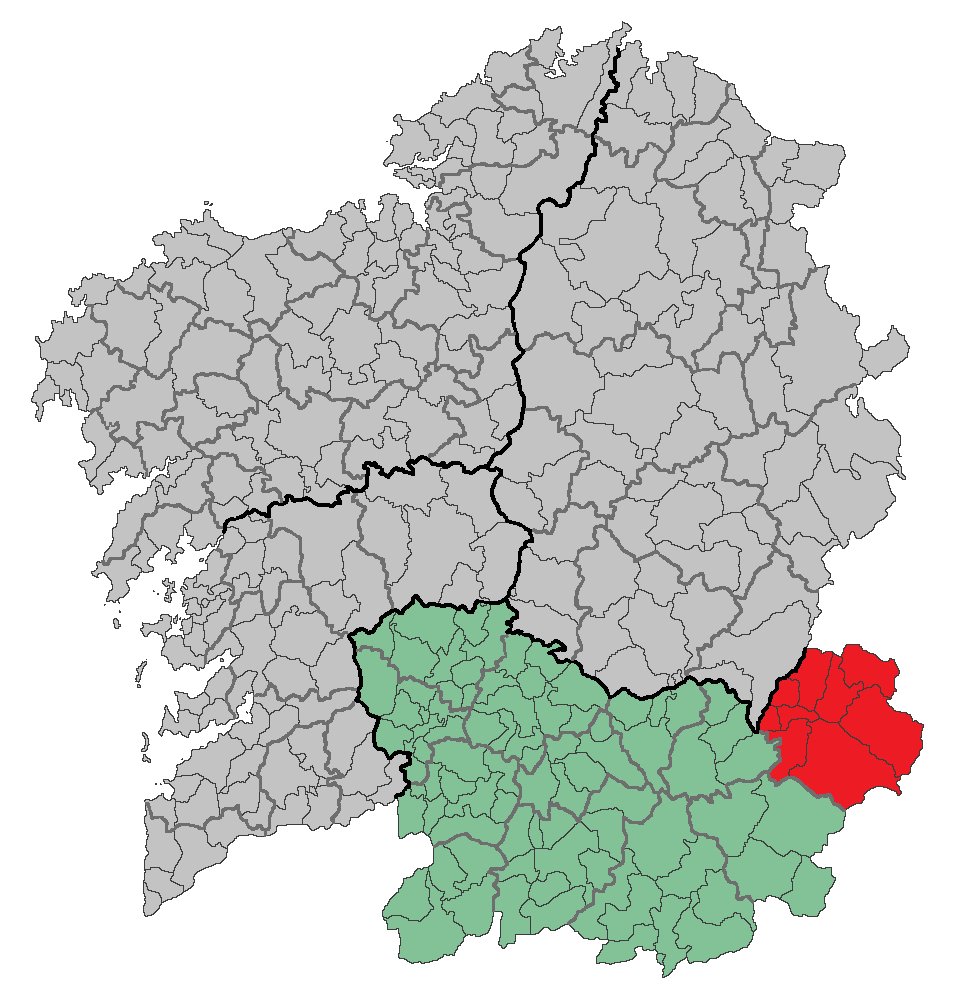
- Country: Spain
- Autonomous community: Galicia
- Province: Ourense
- Capital: O Barco de Valdeorras
- Municipalities: List: O Barco de Valdeorras, O Bolo, Carballeda de Valdeorras, Larouco, Petín, A Rúa, Rubiá, A Veiga, Vilamartín de Valdeorras

Area
  - Total: 972.7 km^{2} (375.6 sq mi)

Population (2019)
  - Total: 25,500
  - Density: 26.2/km^{2} (67.9/sq mi)
- Demonym: valdeorreses/as
- Time zone: UTC+1 (CET)
  - Summer (DST): UTC+2 (CEST)

Valdeorras is a comarca in the Galician Province of Ourense. The overall population of this local region is 25,500 (2019).

== Municipalities ==
- O Barco de Valdeorras, capital of the comarca
- O Bolo
- Carballeda de Valdeorras
- Larouco
- Petín
- A Rúa
- Rubiá
- A Veiga
- Vilamartín de Valdeorras
