= Choly Berreteaga =

Argentine TV chef and writer (1927–2018)

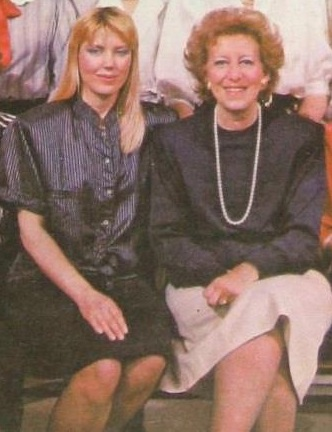
- Berreteaga (right) with Marta Ballina (left) in 1986
- Born: María Esther Brañeiro; 9 October 1927; Larouco, Galicia, Spain
- Died: 26 December 2018 (aged 91); Buenos Aires, Argentina
- Occupations: Chef, TV presenter, and writer
- Spouse: Tiago Berreteaga
- Children: 2

María Esther Brañeiro (9 October 1927 – 26 December 2018), known by her stage name Choly Berreteaga, was an Argentine chef, television presenter, and writer.

== Early life and education ==
Berreteaga was born as María Esther Brañeiro on 9 October 1927 in Larouco, Galicia, Spain. Her father was Galician, her mother's father was from Navarre. In the late 1940s, Berreteaga's family moved to the small town of Castelar in Buenos Aires Province, Argentina, after a doctor recommended moving there to treat her pneumonia.

== Career ==
Before her television career, Berreteaga taught at School 17 General José de San Martín in Castelar.

When channel 13's [es] Buenas Tardes, Mucho Gusto (Good Afternoon, Nice to Meet You) show gave housewives the opportunity to prepare a dish live on air in 1963, Berreteaga's niece Alicia convinced her to apply. From 1986, Berreteaga worked for the television programme Utilísima [es]. She cooked on camera until she was 86, and said goodbye in a series called 50 Years with Choly.

Berreteaga also published over 50 cookbooks. Her book Easy Cooking for the Modern Woman (1976) is a best-selling book in Argentina. Other notable publications include The Cuisine of Our Land (1991). She has also published a work of fiction, La Casa Olvidada (The Forgotten House).

== Honors and awards ==
In 2009, Berreteaga was declared an illustrious citizen of the Partido de Morón. In 2014, she was awarded the Norma Pla Prize by the University of Morón.

== Death ==
Berreteaga died on 26 December 2018 in Buenos Aires, Argentina, aged 91.

== Personal life ==
In 1955, Berreteaga married Tiago Berreteaga and took his surname. They had twins together, Claudia María and Luis. Her husband died in 2010.
