= Outes =

- Municipality
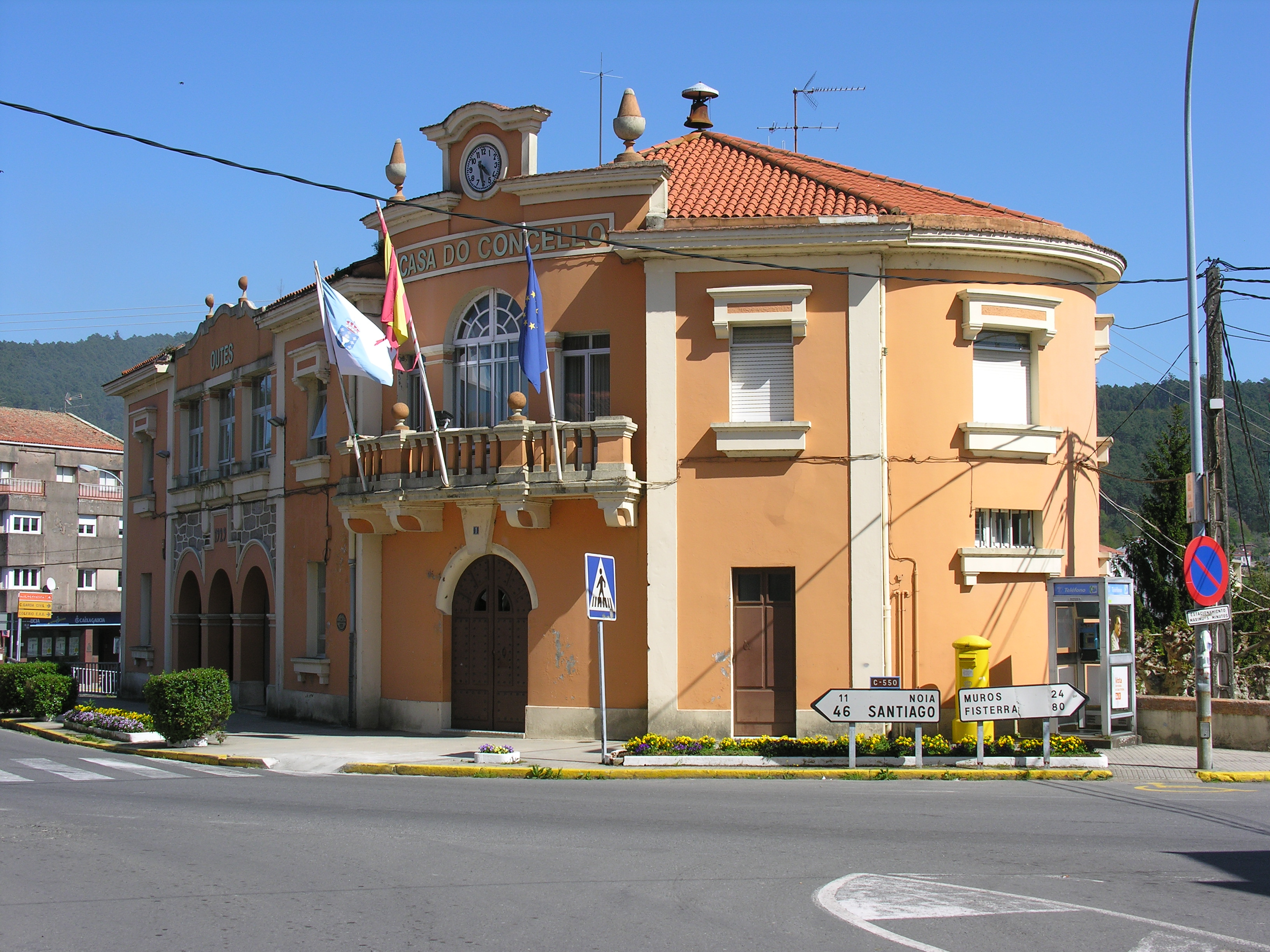

- Coat of arms

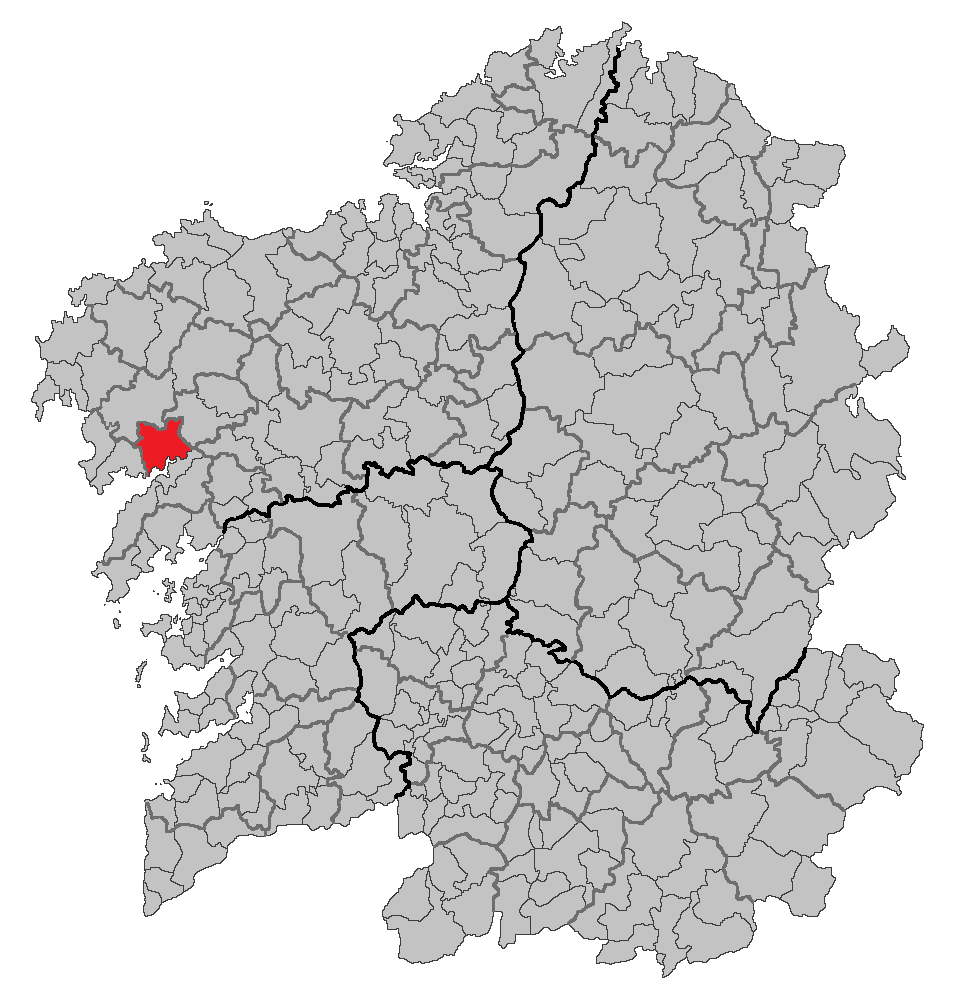
- Location of Outes

- Location in Spain Outes (Spain)
- Coordinates: 42°51′N 8°54′W
- Country: Spain
- Autonomous community: Galicia
- Province: A Coruña

Government

Area
  - Total: 99.7 km^{2} (38.5 sq mi)
- Highest elevation: 531 m (1,742 ft)
- Lowest elevation: 0 m (0 ft)

Population (2025-01-01)
  - Total: 5,998
  - Density: 60.2/km^{2} (156/sq mi)
- Demonym: outiense
- Time zone: UTC+1 (CET)
  - Summer (DST): UTC+2 (CEST)
- Website: Official website

Outes is a municipality in the province of A Coruña in the autonomous community of Galicia in northwestern Spain. It has a population of 6,155 (Spanish 2020 Census) and an area of 100 km^{2}.

The Cando event happened in 1994 within the boundaries of Cando, in the parish of San Tirso. The municipality has five peaks ranging over 500 m, the highest being Monte Tremuzo.

== Villages ==
- O Freixo de Sabardes

== See also ==
List of municipalities in A Coruña
