= Rubiá =

- Municipality
- Coat of arms

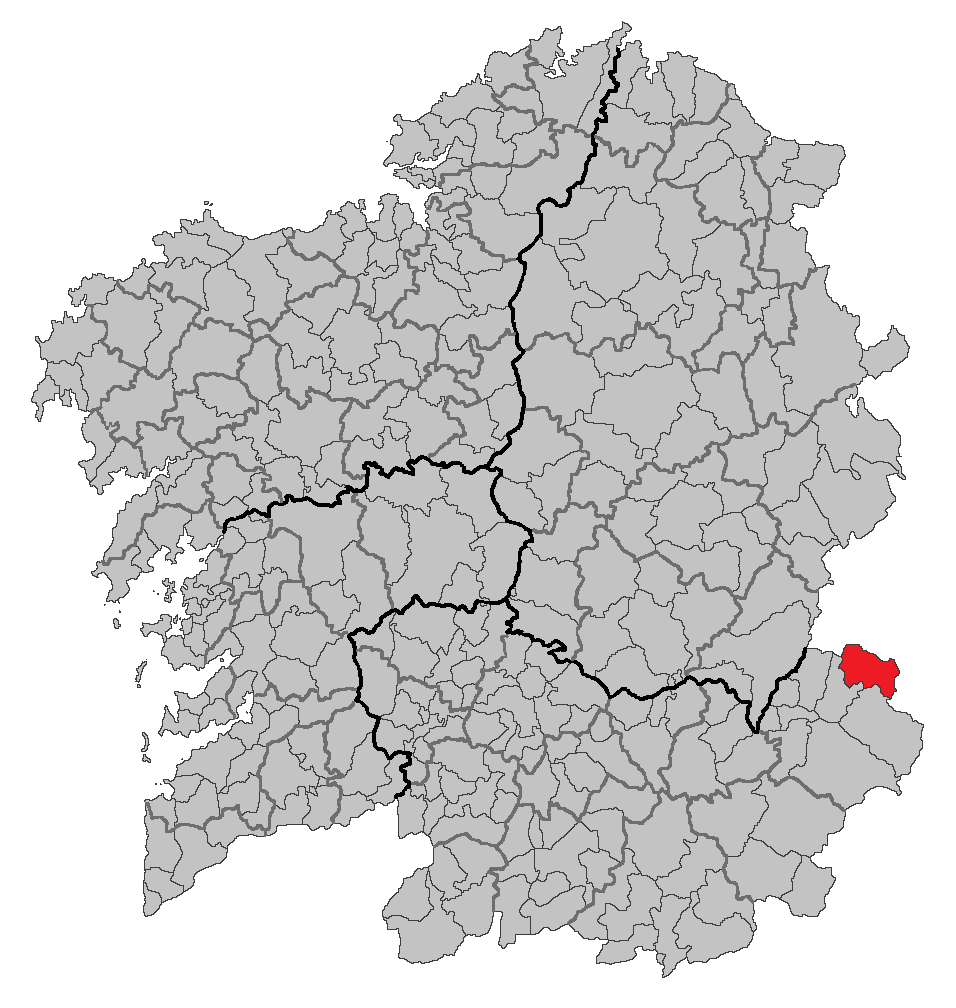
- Location in Galicia

- Location in Spain
- Coordinates: 42°26′59″N 6°56′56″W
- Country: Spain
- Autonomous community: Galicia
- Province: Ourense
- Comarca: Valdeorras

Government
  - Mayor: Elías Rodríguez Núñez (PP)

Area
  - Total: 100.7 km^{2} (38.9 sq mi)
- Elevation: 512 m (1,680 ft)

Population (2025-01-01)
  - Total: 1,391
  - Density: 13.81/km^{2} (35.78/sq mi)
- Time zone: UTC+1 (CET)
  - Summer (DST): UTC+2 (CEST)

Rubiá is a municipality in the province of Ourense, in the autonomous community of Galicia, Spain. It belongs to the comarca of Valdeorras. It has a population of 1448 as of 2016 and an area of 101 km².
