= O Freixo de Sabardes =

San Xoán do Freixo de Sabardes
- Village
- Nickname: O Freixo
- Interactive map of San Xoán do Freixo de Sabardes
- Coordinates: 42°47′34.6″N 8°56′53.1″W
- Country: Spain
- Autonomous community: Galicia
- Province: A Coruña
- Comarca: Noia (comarca)
- Municipality: Outes

Population (2012)
  - Total: 991
- Time zone: UTC+1 (CET)
  - Summer (DST): UTC+2 (CET)

O Freixo de Sabardes or O Freixo is a village and parish in the Outes Mountain range (Serra de Outes in Galician), which is in the county of Outes, which is in the province of A Coruña, Galiza. In 2012 the population was 991 residents (483 men and 508 women), which was a decrease of 31 from 2011. The local saint, St John the Evangelist (San Xoán Evanxelista in Galician) is celebrated on 27 of December.

== Gallery ==
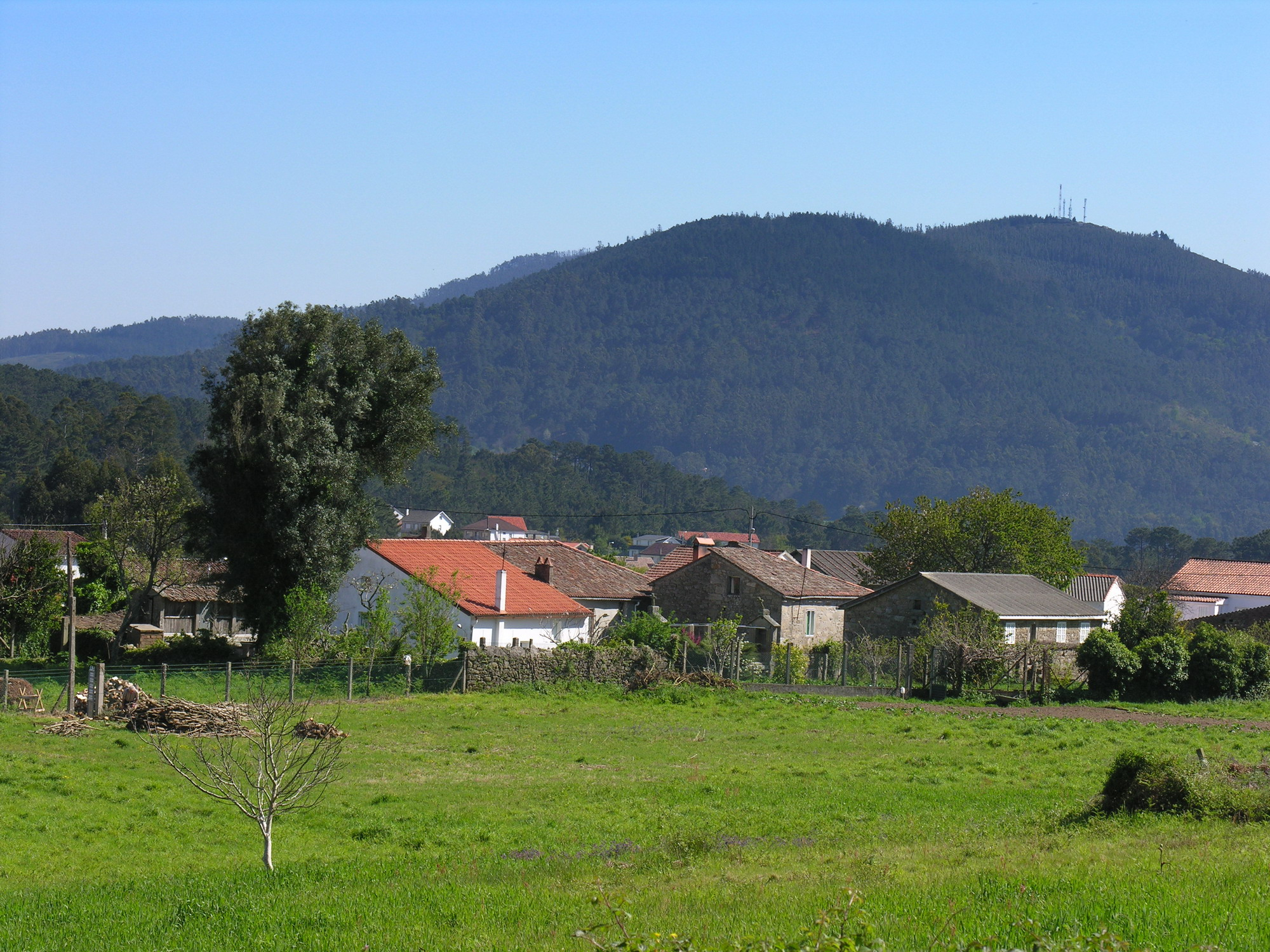

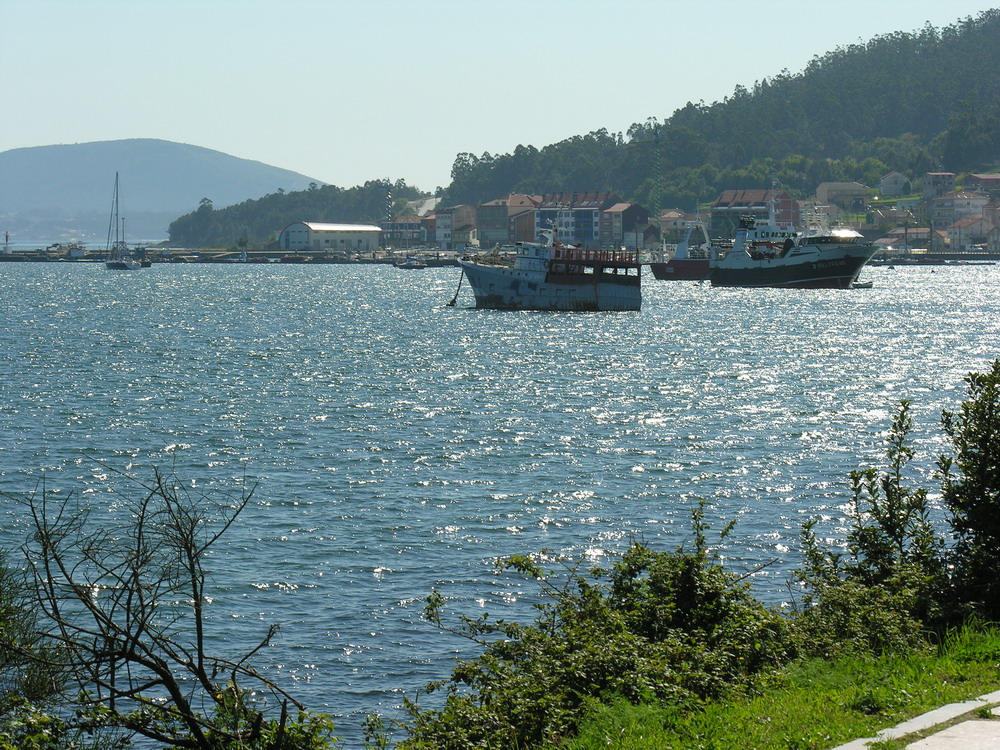

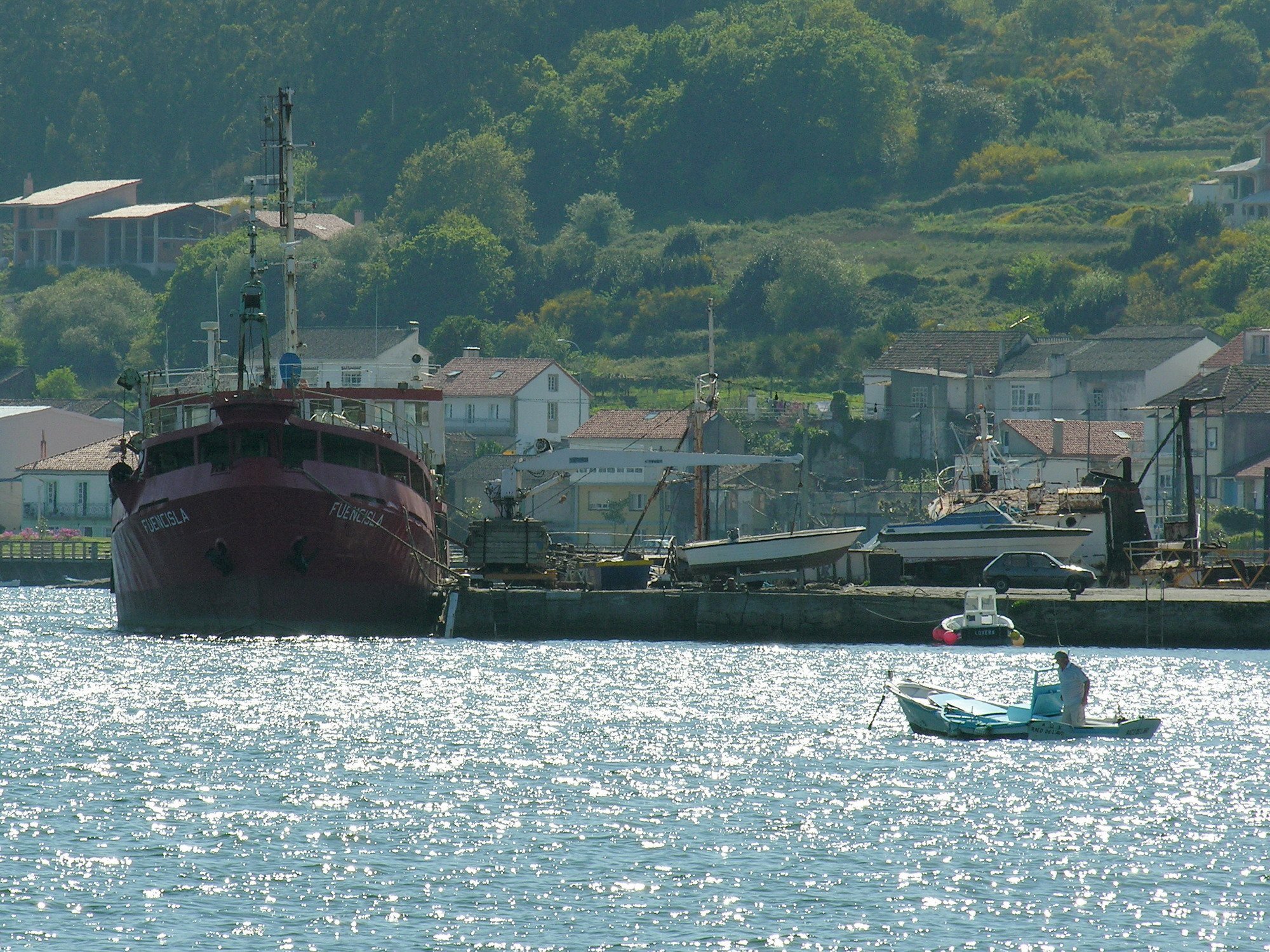

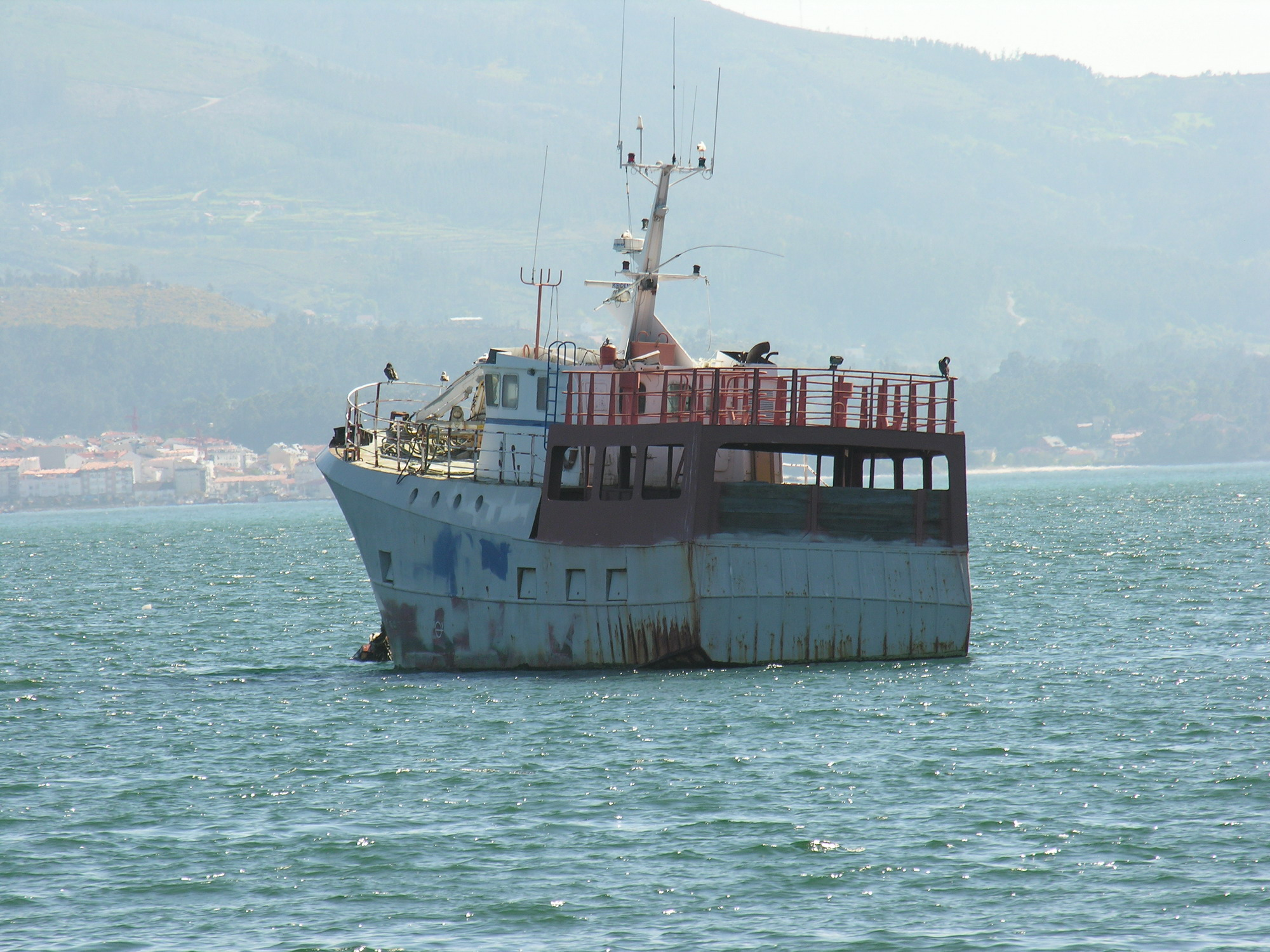

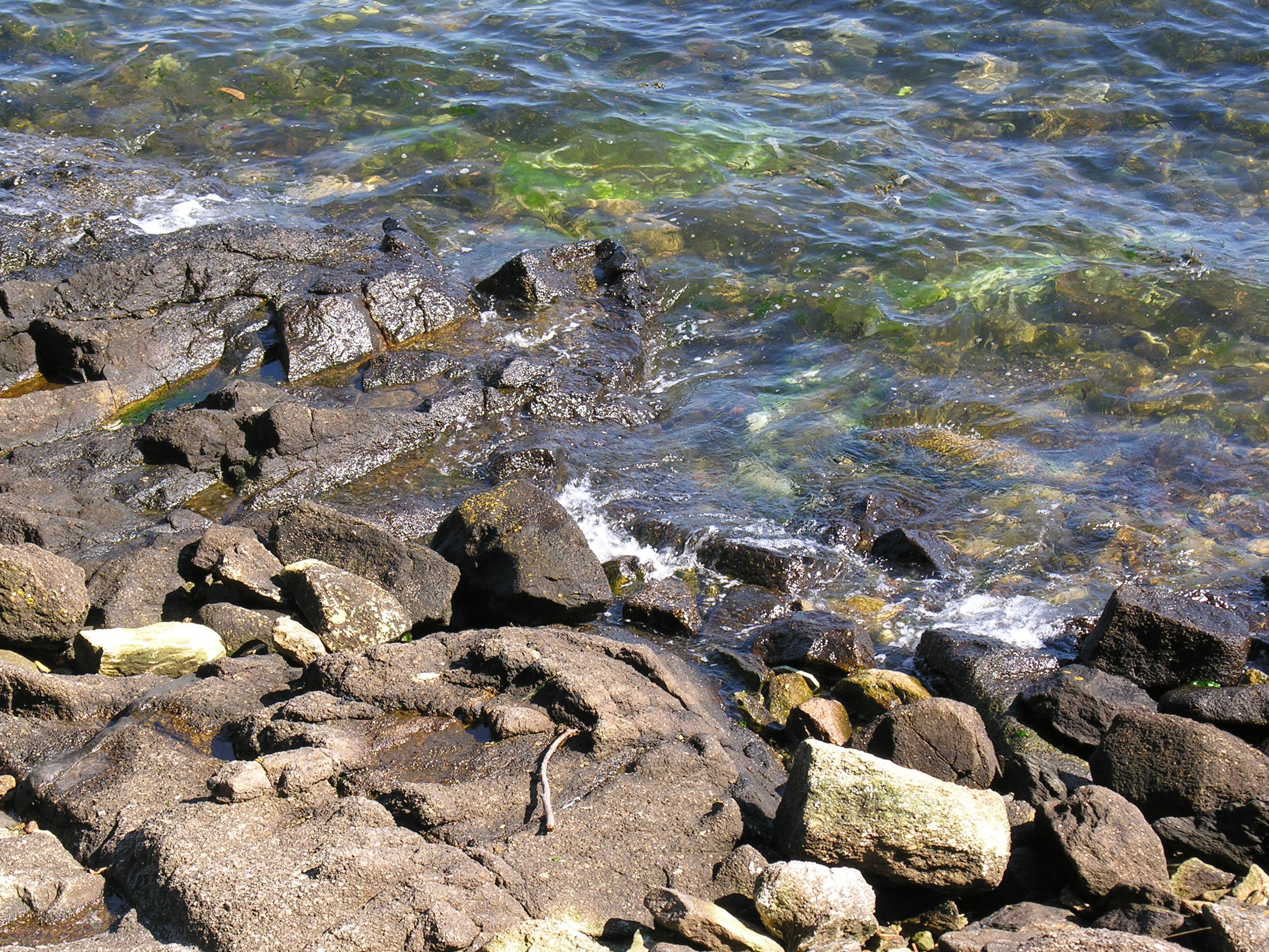
