= Larouco =

- municipality
- Coat of arms

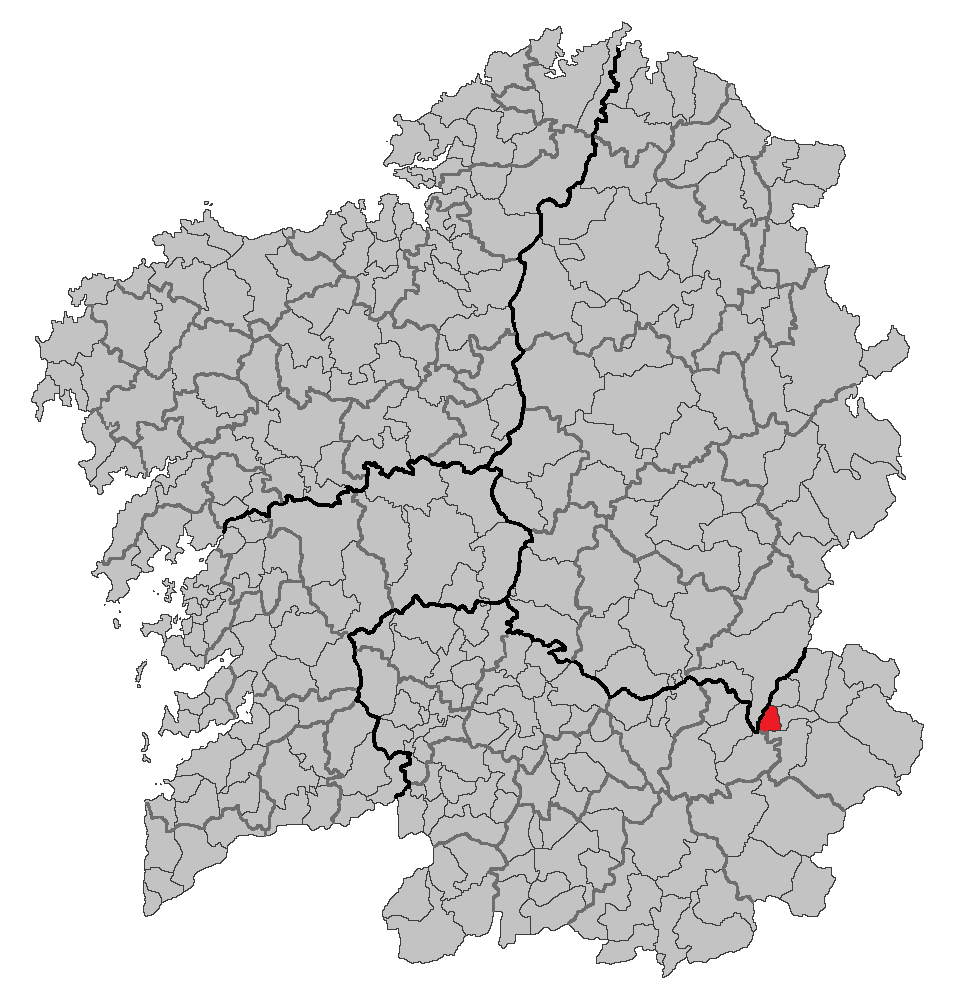
- Location in Galicia

- Location in Spain
- Coordinates: 42°20′48″N 7°09′48″W
- Country: Spain
- Autonomous community: Galicia
- Province: Ourense
- Comarca: Valdeorras

Government
  - Mayor: Joaquín Bautista Prieto Rodríguez (People's Party)

Area
  - Total: 23.7 km^{2} (9.2 sq mi)
- Elevation: 540 m (1,770 ft)

Population (2025-01-01)
  - Total: 484
  - Density: 20.4/km^{2} (52.9/sq mi)
- Time zone: UTC+1 (CET)
  - Summer (DST): UTC+2 (CEST)

Larouco is a municipality in the province of Ourense, in the autonomous community of Galicia, Spain. It belongs to the comarca of Valdeorras.

== Notable people ==
Choly Berreteaga, chef and TV presenter
