= Vilamartín de Valdeorras =

- Municipality
- Coat of arms

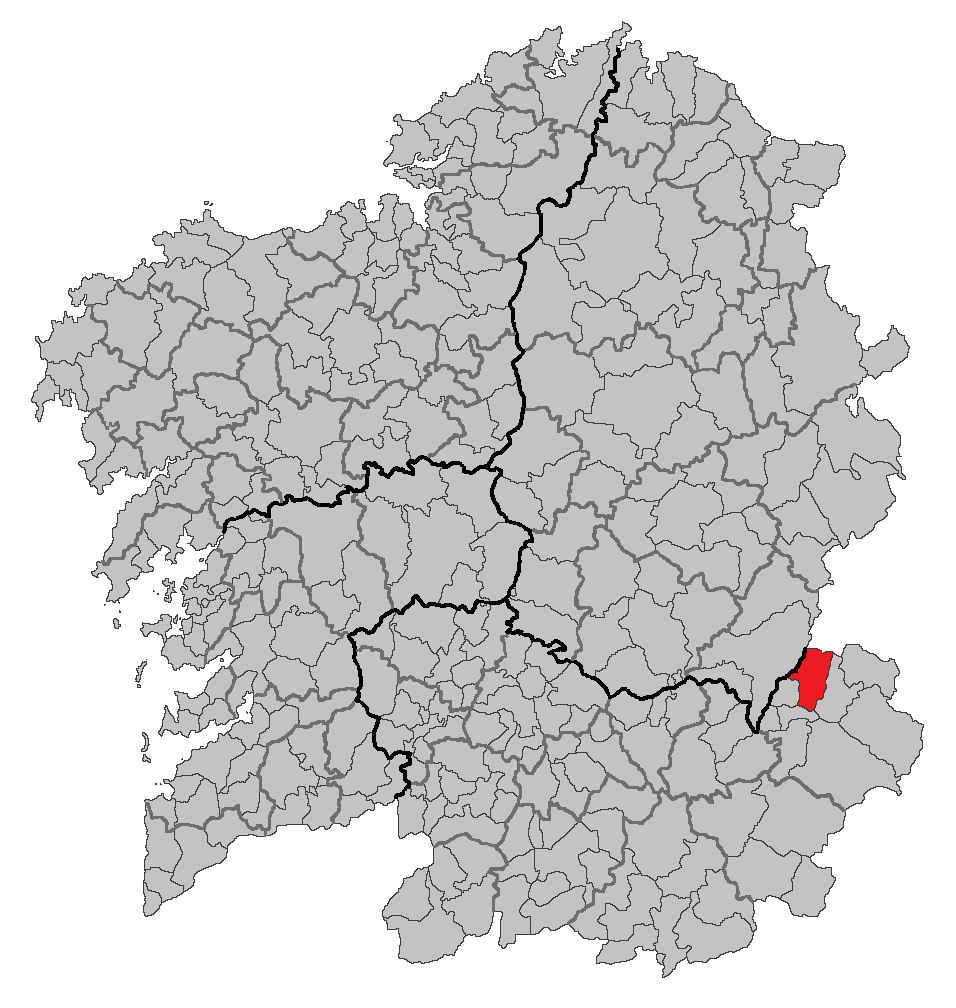
- Location in Galicia

- Location in Spain
- Coordinates: 42°24′56″N 7°03′33″W
- Country: Spain
- Autonomous community: Galicia
- Province: Ourense
- Comarca: Valdeorras

Government
  - Mayor: Enrique Álvarez Barreiro (Socialists' Party of Galicia)

Area
  - Total: 88.3 km^{2} (34.1 sq mi)
- Elevation: 321 m (1,053 ft)

Population (2025-01-01)
  - Total: 1,817
  - Density: 20.6/km^{2} (53.3/sq mi)
- Time zone: UTC+1 (CET)
  - Summer (DST): UTC+2 (CEST)
- Website: www.vilamartindevaldeorras.es

Vilamartín de Valdeorras is a municipality in the province of Ourense, in the autonomous community of Galicia, Spain. It belongs to the comarca of Valdeorras.
