= Galician Massif =

Mountain ranges in Spain

- Macizo Galaico; Macizo Galaico-Leonés
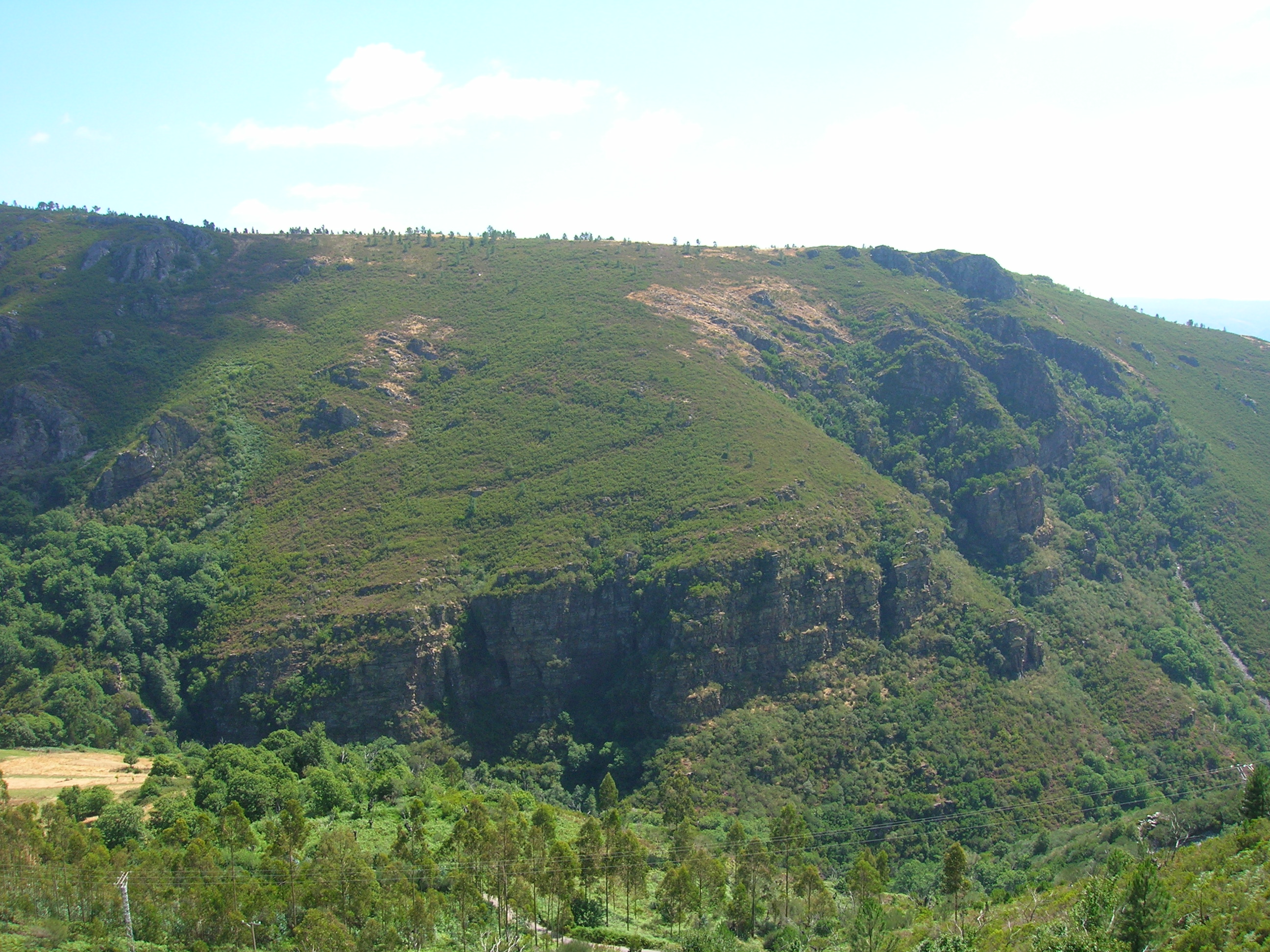

Highest point
- Peak: Peña Trevinca
- Elevation: 2,124 m (6,969 ft)
- Coordinates: 42°14′33″N 6°47′45″W

Geography
- Topographic map of Galicia
- Country: Spain
- Autonomous Communities: Galicia and Castile and León
- Range coordinates: 42°30′N 8°6′W

Geology
- Orogeny: Variscan orogeny
- Rock age: Paleozoic
- Rock types: Schist, gneiss and granite

The Galician Massif or Galician-Leonese Massif (Spanish: Macizo Galaico, also known as Macizo Galaico-Leonés) is a system of mountain ranges in the northwestern corner of the Iberian Peninsula. It is located in Galicia with its southeastern end reaching into the provinces of Zamora and León of Castile and León. Its highest point is Pena Trevinca at 2,127 metres (6,978 ft) . Another important peak is Cabeza de Manzaneda (1,781 m).

In traditional local folklore the forests of the Galician System are said to be inhabited by a variety of elves, fairies, ghosts, the Santa Compaña, the Nubeiro and witches (meigas).

== Geology ==
Geomorphologically the Galician Massif is a northwestern prolongation of the Meseta Central, the inner Iberian plateau and has great affinity with the geology of the Tras os Montes Portuguese region, so that it is considered as a whole under the name 'Galicia-Trás-os-Montes Zone'. It is composed of Paleozoic materials (granite) with metamorphic rocks such as gneiss, slate and schist in the center and west, which were subject to Alpine folding. Its eastern end merges with the Cantabrian Mountains.

The relief of the system, with an average height of 500 metres (1,600 ft), is relatively smooth compared with other Iberian ranges. It is however very complex, having no defined structural alignment owing to the heavy fluvial erosion that has fragmented the terrain.

Generally the system includes mountains that are rounded in shape, often topped by small rocky outcrops, as well as horsts, basins and faults, roughly aligned in a N-S direction.

=== Vegetation ===
Since rain is abundant in Galicia, the undisturbed areas of the massif have a soft soil texture and are covered in dense vegetation of temperate deciduous forest where Quercus petraea and Quercus robur oaks predominate. The woods alternate with shrubland and wide natural meadows.

The vegetation is quite homogeneous throughout the massif and there is great plant biodiversity in the Galician mountains. Many of the species found in the mountains were used in Galician traditional medicine.

The Serra dos Ancares was declared a UNESCO Biosphere Reserve in 2006.

== Mountain ranges ==
From the southeast to the northwest the Galician Massif has three physiographic longitudinal sections:

- The southwestern ranges; the highest elevations are found in this sector, including 2,047 m high Pena Trevinca, the highest point of the whole system. These ranges reach into the provinces of León and Zamora, hence the alternative name Macizo Galaico-Leonés, and show scars of the glacial period, which are apparent in the Serra do Eixe, also known as Serra da Segundera (Spanish: Sierra Segundera). Rivers Tera, Cabreira and Bibei run through glacial valleys and the San Martín de Castañeda Lake, Laguna de Lacillo lakes are moraine-dammed lakes.
- The Galician Dorsal Range; with 1,778 m high Cabeza de Manzaneda, its highest elevation. A tectonic basin running in a north–south direction separates it from the southwestern ranges. It includes the Central Ourensan Massif.
- The coastal ranges; such as Serra da Barbanza, are generally of a much lesser height and are separated from the Galician Dorsal Range by the Tui-Verín-Vigo intermontane basin.

=== List of ranges ===
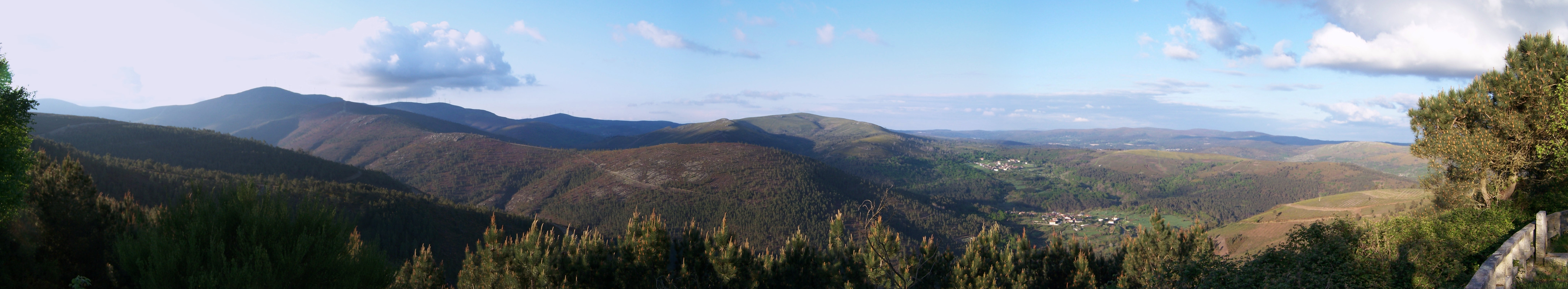
Paraño Mountains in Ourense Province seen from N-541 road

- Serra de Meira
- Serra de Xistral
- Serra da Barbanza
- Serra da Cova da Serpe
- Serra do Faro
- Testeiro Range
- Galiñeiro Range
- Serra do Courel
- Serra dos Ancares
- Central Ourensan Massif
- Serra do Suído
- Serra do Eixe
- Serra do Xurés

=== Main ranges and features ===
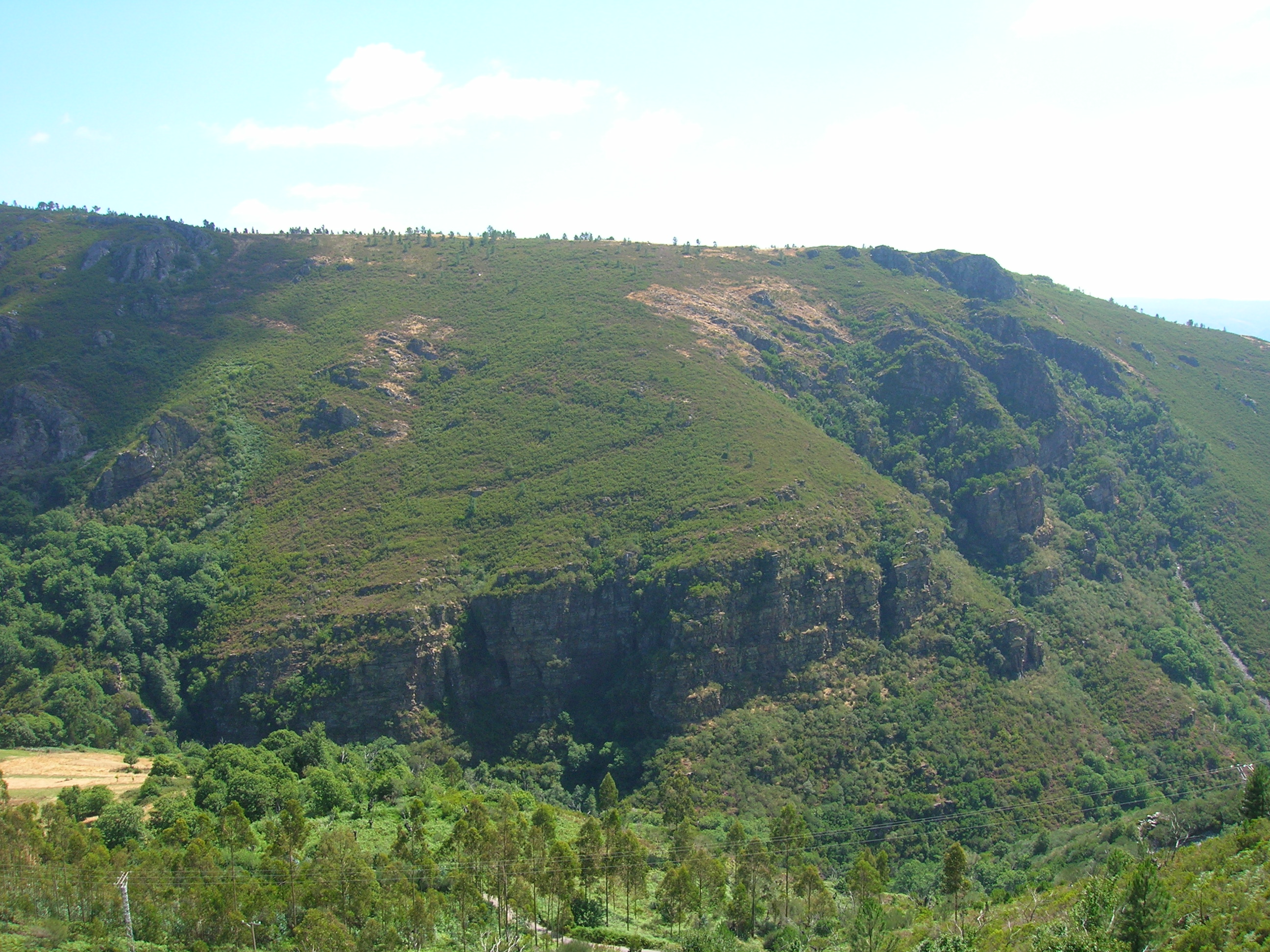
Fold formation in Campodola-Leixazos, Serra do Courel, Lugo Province

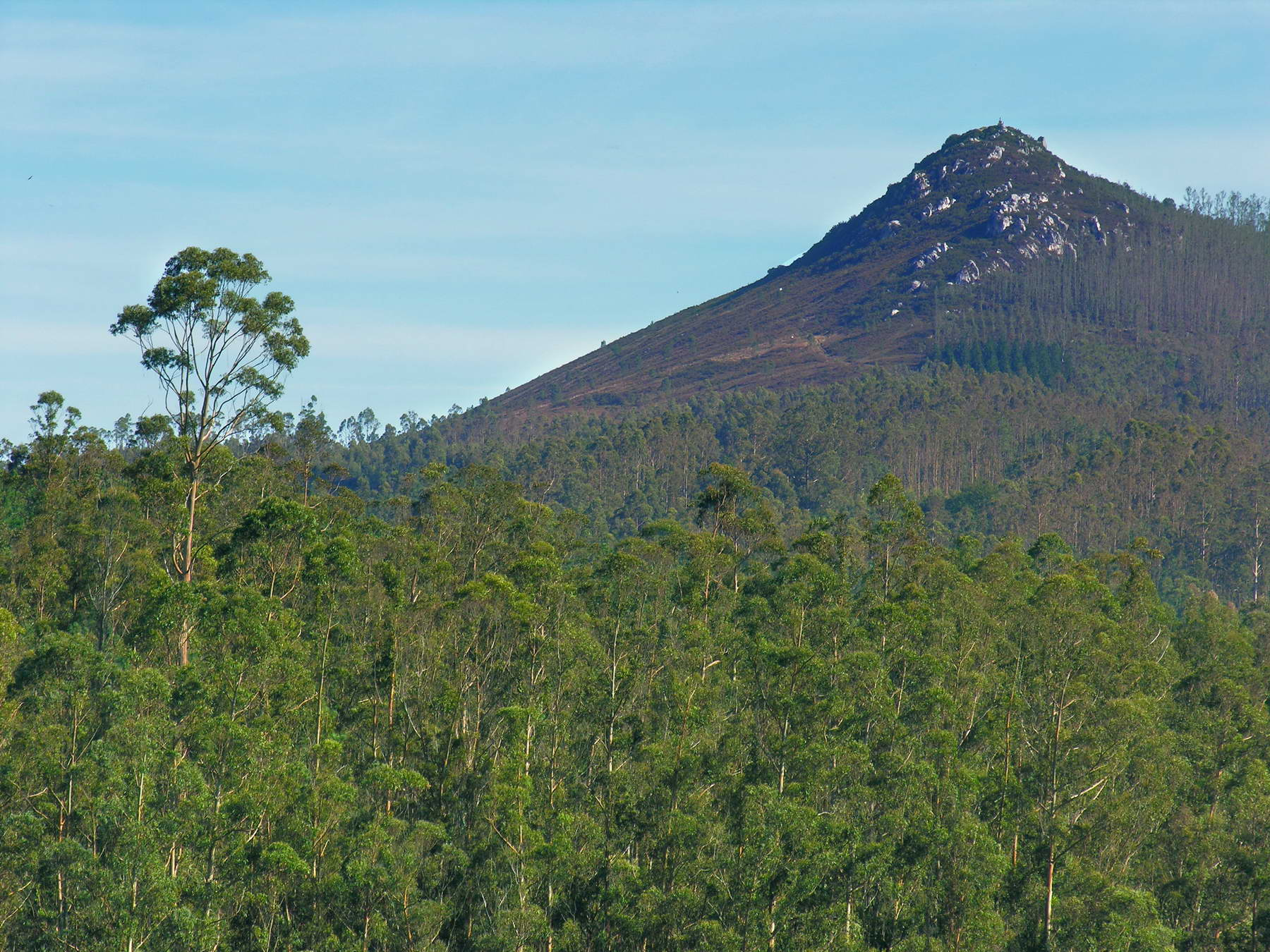
Pico Sacro near Boqueixón

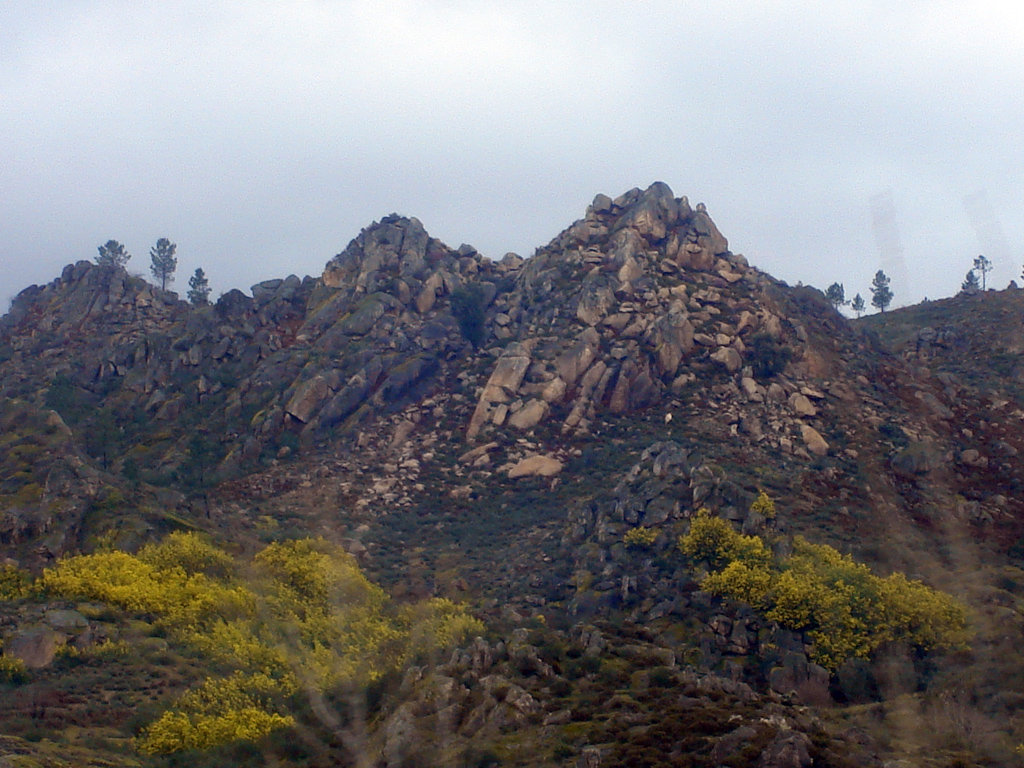
Mountain peaks near Verín

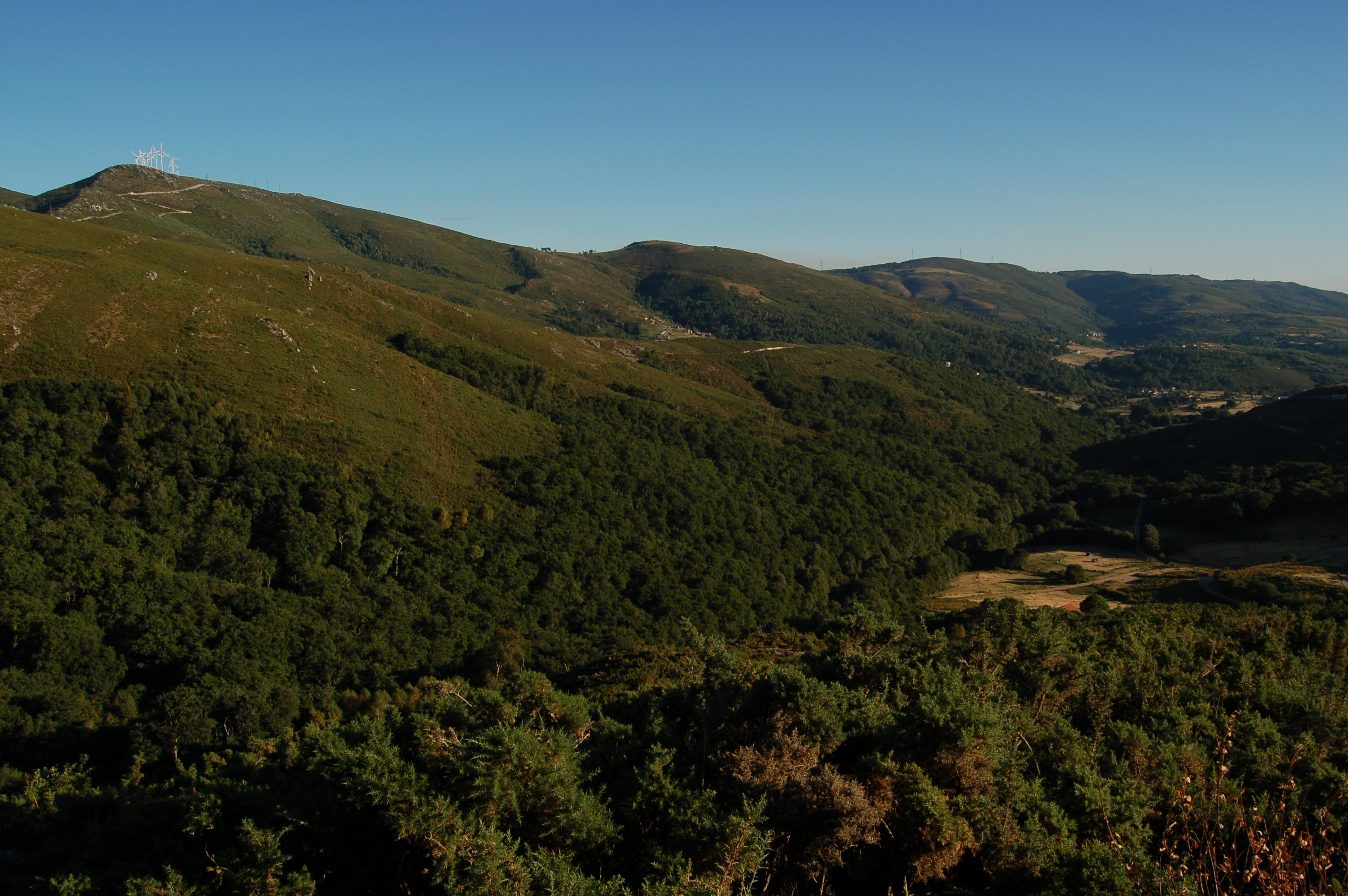
View of Serra do Faro

== See also ==
- Cantabrian Mountains
- Geography of Galicia
- Geography of Spain
- Geology of the Iberian Peninsula
