= Bibey =

Coordinates: 4°52′N 12°49′E

- Commune and town
- Interactive map of Bibey
- Country: Cameroon
- Time zone: UTC+1 (WAT)

Bibey is a town and commune in Cameroon.

== See also ==
- Communes of Cameroon
