= Teixidó =

Teixidó or Teixido is a Catalan occupational surname that means "weaver", a variant of Teixidor. Notable people with this surname include:

- Enrique Gimeno Teixidó (1929–2007), Spanish-Mexican composer and conductor
- Frédéric Teixido (b. 1972), French footballer
- Lionel Teixido (b. 1979), French rugby league player
- Mercedes Teixido, American artist
- Nuria Quevedo Teixidó (b. 1938), Spanish painter and graphic artist
