= Serra da Barbanza =

Mountain range in Spain

Serra do Barbanza
- Sierra del Barbanza
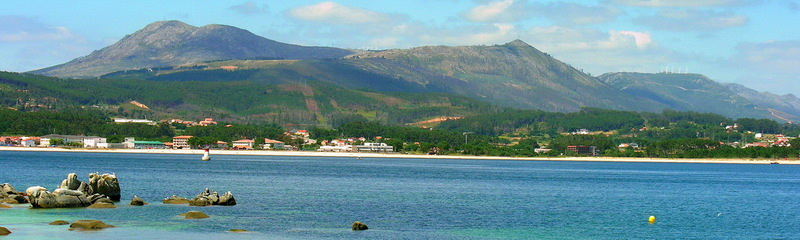

Highest point
- Peak: Iroite
- Elevation: 685 m (2,247 ft)
- Coordinates: 42°43′35″N 8°55′25″W

Dimensions
- Length: 5 km (3.1 mi) N/S
- Width: 2 km (1.2 mi) E/W

Geography
- Location within Spain
- Location: La Coruña Province, Galicia
- Country: Spain
- Parent range: Galician Massif

The Serra do Barbanza (Spanish: Sierra del Barbanza) is a mountain range in north-west Spain, extending in a south-westerly direction from Noia in Galicia.

== Geography ==
The range forms the peninsula between the two rias of ría de Muros e Noia and ría de Arousa in the extreme west of Galicia. Due to the relatively large height of over 600 metres (2,000 ft) with respect to the proximity to the two rias it forms an impressive mountain range though small in length.

Highest peaks in the range are Monte Iroite (685 m), Pico Murralla (658 m), Torre de Inxerto (654 m) and Monte Curota (618 m).

== Flora and fauna ==
Common vegetation on the mountain range is genista and pines.

Wild horses are common. Other mammals include the Iberian wolf, fox and wild pig.

== See also ==
- Barbanza
