= Carballeda de Valdeorras =

- Municipality
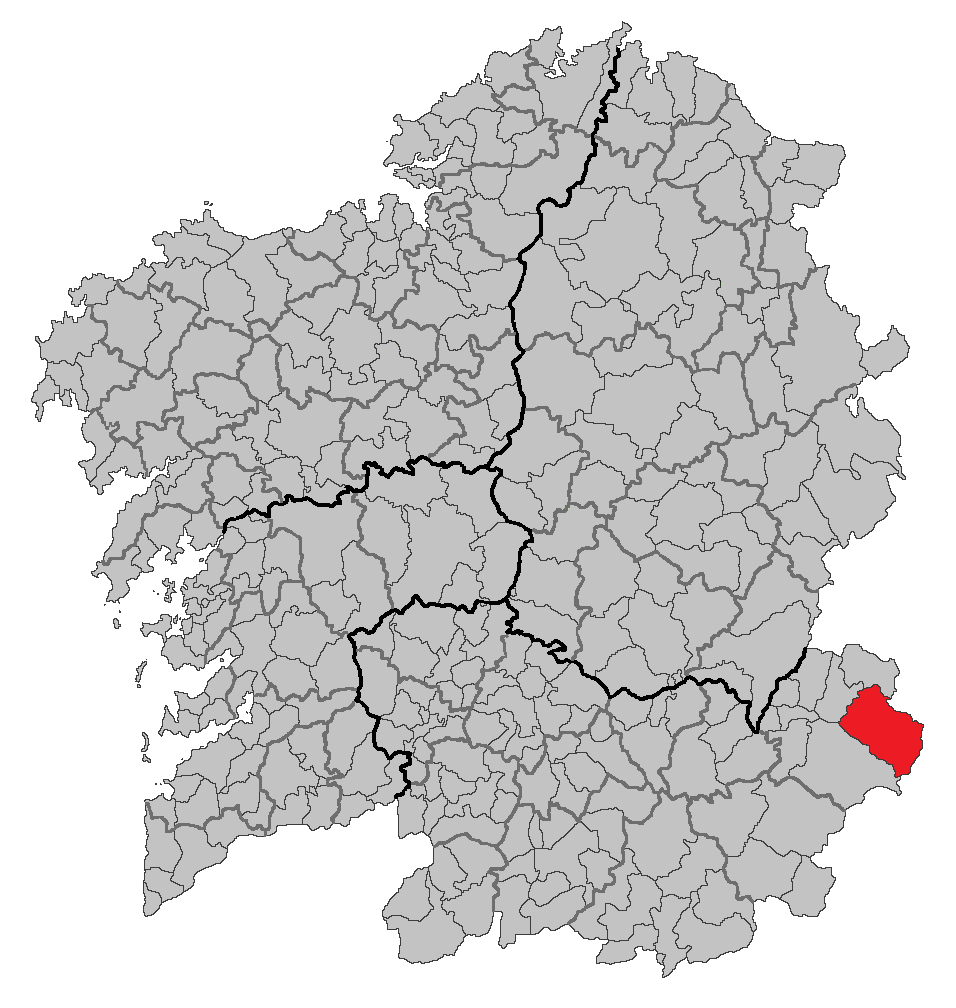
- Location in Galicia

- Location in Spain
- Coordinates: 42°22′34″N 6°52′39″W
- Country: Spain
- Autonomous community: Galicia
- Province: Ourense
- Comarca: Valdeorras

Government
  - Mayor: María Carmen González Quintela (PPdeG)

Area
  - Total: 222.7 km^{2} (86.0 sq mi)
- Elevation: 601 m (1,972 ft)

Population (2025-01-01)
  - Total: 1,311
  - Density: 5.887/km^{2} (15.25/sq mi)
- Time zone: UTC+1 (CET)
  - Summer (DST): UTC+2 (CEST)
- INE municipality code: 32017

Carballeda de Valdeorras is a large municipality in the province of Ourense, in the autonomous community of Galicia, Spain. It belongs to the comarca of Valdeorras.

The only taxus baccata forest in Galicia is located within this municipality.

== Villages ==
- Candeda
- Carballeda
- Casaio
- Casoio
- Domiz
- Lardeira
- A Portela do Trigal
- Pumares
- Pusmazán
- Riodolas
- Robledo
- San Xusto
- Santa Cruz
- Sobradelo
- Soutadoiro
- Vila
- Viladequinta
