= Teixidor =

Teixidor or Texidor is a Catalan occupational surname that means "weaver". Notable people with this surname include:

- Richard Texidor (b. 1956), Puerto Rican narcotics crime boss
- Emili Teixidor (1932–2012), Spanish writer
- Enric Saborit Teixidor (b. 1992), Spanish footballer
- Jaime Teixidor (1884–1957), Spanish musician
- Joe Texidor (1941–2007), Puerto Rican jazz percussionist
- José María Doussinague y Teixidor (1894–1967), Spanish diplomat
- Josefa Texidor Torres (1865–1914), Spanish painter
- Montserrat Teixidor i Bigas (born 1958), Spanish-American mathematician
- Pere d'Alberní i Teixidor (1747–1802), Spanish soldier

== See also ==
- Teixidó
- Texidor's twinge
