= Petín =

- municipality
- Flag Coat of arms

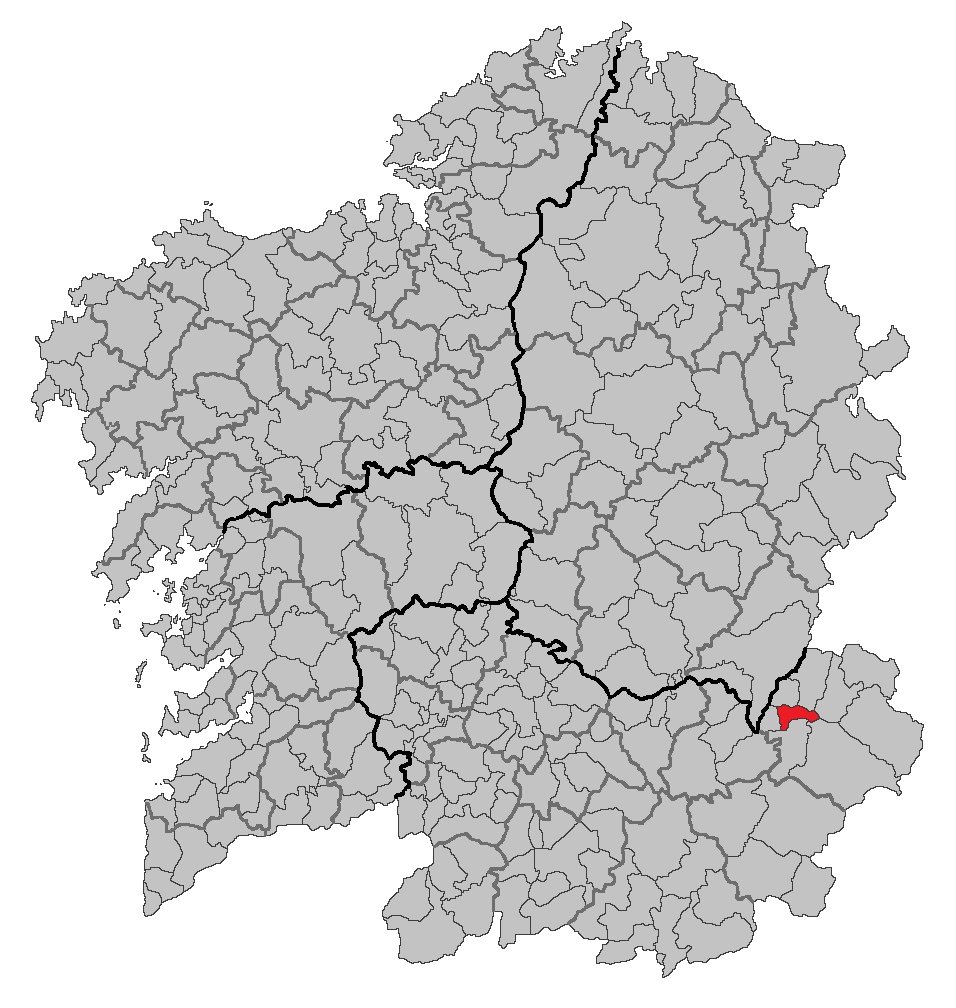
- Location in Galicia

- Location in Spain
- Coordinates: 42°22′56″N 7°07′33″W
- Country: Spain
- Autonomous community: Galicia
- Province: Ourense
- Comarca: Valdeorras

Government
  - Mayor: Miguel Bautista Carballo (PSdeG-PSOE)

Area
  - Total: 30.5 km^{2} (11.8 sq mi)
- Elevation: 300 m (980 ft)

Population (2025-01-01)
  - Total: 856
  - Density: 28.1/km^{2} (72.7/sq mi)
- Time zone: UTC+1 (CET)
  - Summer (DST): UTC+2 (CEST)
- Website: Official website

Petín is a municipality in the province of Ourense, in the autonomous community of Galicia, Spain. It belongs to the comarca of Valdeorras. It has a population of 1131 (Spanish 2001 Census) and an area of 31 km^{2}.
