= Froila Ramírez =

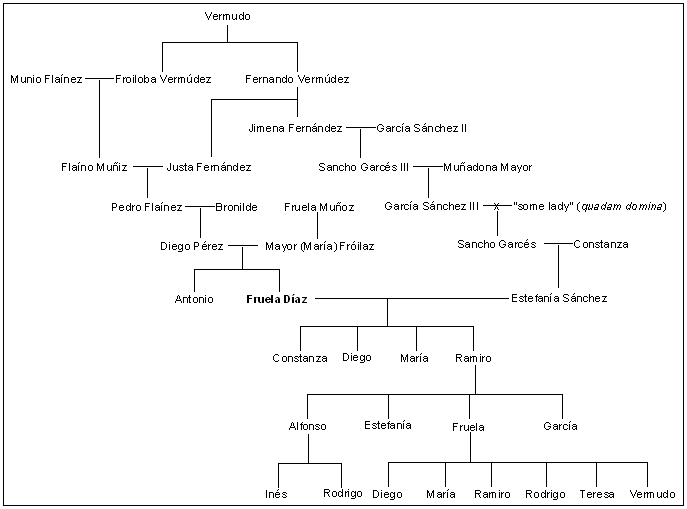
A family tree of the Flagínez family, emphasising the place of Froila's grandfather and namesake Froila Díaz.

Froila Ramírez, also spelled Fruela or Froilán (fl. 1150 – 1202), was a Leonese nobleman and a member of the Flagínez family. His power and influence lay chiefly in the heart of the province of León and its west, but it extended also into Galicia and the Asturias. He was most active after the death of his father (1169/70) and more especially that of his brother (1185) until his own death, probably in 1203.

== Parents, marriages, children ==
Froila was the second son of Ramiro Fróilaz and his first wife, Inés (Agnes). He is first mentioned in a document dated 22 September 1150, whereby his father granted to him and his elder brother, Alfonso, the bridewealth he owed to their late mother. (Note: The original document from Santa María de Otero de las Dueñas, where Froila's family archives were kept, is transcribed and edited in Barton 1997, p. 313, where Froila's name is given as Froile Ramiri and later Froala Ramiri.)

Froila married his first wife, Urraca González, daughter of Gonzalo Fernández and granddaughter of Fernando Pérez of the House of Traba, sometime before 28 September 1171. Froila had been raised at the court of Fernando Pérez, for on 29 June 1170 he granted the monastery of San Esteban de Morás (Morales) to Urraca "out of love for your grandfather, Count Don Fernando, who raised me, and because of faithful service when I was accepted by your father, Count Don Gonzalo". (Note: The original Latin reads: propter amore auu uestri comitis domni Fernandi qui me creauit, et propter seruicium fidelem quem accepi a patre uestro comite domno Gundisaluo.) In the charter recording the gift, Froila does not indicate that he and Urraca were yet married at that time.

Urraca died on 1 August 1190. By May 1198, Froila had remarried to Sancha Fernández, daughter of Fernando Arias and Teresa Bermúdez, a daughter of Count Bermudo Pérez de Traba. His second wife was thus a second cousin of his first, both being descended from Count Pedro Fróilaz. Sancha was still living in 1234, when she donated land at Fresnedo to the Abbey of San Andrés in Vega de Espinareda.

There has been some confusion about the number and maternity of Froila's known children. His known children were Teresa, Nuño (Munio), María, Diego, Ramiro, Rodrigo and Bermudo (Vermudo). The historians Mercedes Durany Castrillo and Francisco de Cadenas Allende both believed that all his children came from his second wife, Sancha.

Nonetheless, the maternity of most can be pieced together from documents. On 8 September 1189, Froila and Urraca's daughter Teresa took part in the sale of some land in the Curueña valley to a canon of León Cathedral named Pedro Spina for 80 maravedíes. In September 1203, probably after Froila's death, his second wife, Sancha, together with her children by Froila and three of Froila's children by Urraca, donated their share in the monastery of San Antolín de Huerna that they had inherited to the monastery of Carbajal. Urraca's named children are Nuño, Teresa and María. (Note: "I, lady Sancha, countess, with my children that I have with the lord Froila, count, and we who are children of the said count by another, Nuño Froila and Teresa Fróilaz and María Fróilaz" (ego, domna Sancia, commitissa, cum filiis meis quos habeo de domnus Froila, comes, et nos qui sumus ex alia parte filii istius comes, Nunnius Froila et Tarasia Frolez et Maria Frolez).)

In January 1211, Sancha donated the church of Villarroañe to the monastery of Santa María de Carracedo for the sake her soul and that of her late husband. It was witnessed by four of her sons: Ramiro Fróilaz, Diego Fróilaz, Rodrigo Fróilaz and Bermudo Fróilaz. On 9 February 1212, Sancha granted her possessions in Tibianes and Pereiro to the monastery of Sobrado, which was witnessed by her sons Ramiro and Diego. On 29 August 1230, Sancha and her children Ramiro, Diego, Rodrigo and Teresa made a donation the monastery of Sandoval on behalf of the souls of Froila and a certain Bernardo, a son of Froila's and Sancho. On 24 September 1234, she granted her land at Noguerosa to the same monastery and the act was witnessed by Diego. Diego was married to Aldonza Martínez de Silva.

== Religious activity ==
Froila's religious patronage was diverse. He made early grants to the Cathedral of Santa María in León (1174) and the Benedictine monastery at Sahagún (1175). He and his first wife showed partiality to the military orders. In late 1171, Froila's wife Urraca donated some property at Revello near Villalón to the Order of Santiago. He endowed the Knights Hospitaller in 1181 and 1184. Urraca supported the Hospitallers with a gift in 1182. (Note: For details of these donations, cf. García Larragueta 1952, pp. 512–13.)

In 1173, Froila and Urraca granted their property at San Miguel de Camino (Sancti Michaelis de Camino) and Val de Mazana (Valdemanzanas) to the Hospital of San Marcos. In 1188 he made a grant to the Cistercian house of Peñamayor. Urraca patronised the monasteries of Benevívere and Meira in 1189.

== Royal service ==
Froila was a loyal servant and occasional courtier of kings Ferdinand II and Alfonso IX of León. Between 1182 and 1184, he served Ferdinand II as alférez, overseeing the royal military entourage. This post was usually reserved for young noblemen at court, and may be an indicator of Froila's age or relative standing.

Sometime before 11 August 1189, Froila was granted the title count (Latin comes), the highest noble rank in the kingdom. His father and his brother had borne the title before him. He thus transmitted the female title, countess, to his wives. On 9 April 1192, Froila received as a gift the village of Salientes from Alfonso IX pro bono seruicio ("for good service"). It was not the only village in his patrimony. The town of Cifuentes de Rueda had been in his family for generations. In May 1198, Froila and Sancha granted the town a fuero, a municipal charter spelling out the citizens rights and obligations. (Note: For a table of twelfth-century aristocratic fueros, cf. Barton 1997, p. 96.)

In 1196, Froila was considered a royal vassal.

== Tenancies ==
Froila governed several tenencias (fiefs from the crown) in his career. Although these were not hereditary, several of the fiefs that Froila held for an extended period had been ruled by his father, grandfather or brother before him. As early as 1162, he was governing the Bierzo in western León, probably on behalf of his father, who was its tenente continuously from 1147 until 1169. The first tenencia Froila received from the crown was Castrotierra in 1168.

In 1169, shortly after his father's death, Froila received the tenencia of Astorga, which his father and his grandfather, Froila Díaz, had ruled. The tenencia of Astorga conveyed limited powers in the city of Astorga itself, but substantially more in the surrounding region (its terra). He held Astorga until 1174. In 1185, it was granted to his brother Alfonso, but he died shortly thereafter and by 1186 it had been returned to Froila. He governed it for the next two years until 1188, when the death of Ferdinand II occasioned changes in the tenencias.

In 1173 he held briefly the tenencia of Villamor. In 1180–81, he held the Bierzo jointly with his brother Alfonso. In 1186 he was appointed to the vast tenencia of Asturias de Oviedo, where his family's origins lay, and he succeeded Alfonso in the Bierzo. He was re-appointed to govern Oviedo five times (1187, 1189, 1192, 1193 and 1195), but the Bierzo was the centre of his power after the loss of Astorga in 1188. He held it until 1198 with a brief interlude (April 1188–May 1189), when it was held by Velasco Fernández. He also governed the smaller tenancias of Ulver (1190–92), Valcárcel (1190–93) and Villafranca (1189–94), all traditionally associated with the Bierzo.

On the death of Ferdinand II in 1188, Froila was transferred from Astorga to the tenencias of Mayorga, Montenegro, and Sarria. The lands he governed for the crown were rapidly expanded during the early years of Alfonso IX. In 1188, he received the rule of Asturias de Tineo (retained until 1192) and in 1189 a host of other northwestern tenencias: Babia, Faro, Lemos, Monreal and Riba de Esla. Riba de Esla had been held by members of his family throughout the tenth and eleventh centuries.

In 1191, Froila became governor of the towers of León, the royal capital, a post, largely honorific, that had been held by his grandfather before him. In subsequent years he ruled the tenencias of Béjar (1192), Almanza (1193), Valle (1194), and Toro (1197).

Froila is last mentioned in a charter of 18 December 1202 and he probably died shortly after.

== Bibliography ==
=== Secondary sources ===
- Barton, Simon (1997). The Aristocracy in Twelfth-century León and Castile. Cambridge: Cambridge University Press. ISBN 9780521497275.
- Cadenas Allende, Francisco de (1978). "Los Flagínez: una familia leonesa de hace mil años". Estudios genealógicos, heráldicos y nobiliarios en honor de Vicente de Cadenas y Vicent. Vol. 1. Madrid. pp. 177–211.
- Calderón Medina, Inés (2013). "La solidaridad familiar. La participación de la nobleza leonesa en la guerra civil de Portugal (1245–1247". Hispania (in Spanish). LXXIII (245). Madrid: 617–646. doi:10.3989/hispania.2013.016.
- García Larragueta, Santos (1952). "La Orden de San Juan en la crisis del Imperio Hispánico del siglo XII". Hispania. 12 (49): 512–13.
- López Sangil, José Luis (2002). La nobleza altomedieval gallega, la familia Froílaz-Traba (in Spanish). A Coruña: Toxosoutos, S.L. ISBN 84-95622-68-8.
- Martín Rodríguez, José Luis (1964). "Fernando II de León y la Orden de Santiago (1170–1181)". Anuario de Estudios Medievales (in Spanish). No. 1. Barcelona. ISSN 0066-5061.
- Pascua Echegaray, Esther (1989). "Hacia la formación política de la monarquía medieval: las relaciones entre la monarquía y la Iglesia castellanoleonesa en el reinado de Alfonso VII". Hispania. 49 (172): 397–441.
- Torres Sevilla-Quiñones de León, Margarita Cecilia (1999). Linajes nobiliarios de León y Castilla: Siglos IX–XIII (in Spanish). Salamanca: Junta de Castilla y León, Consejería de educación y cultura. ISBN 84-7846-781-5.

=== Primary sources ===
- Casado Quintanilla, Blas (2007). Colección documental del Priorato de San Marcos de León, de la Orden de Santiago (1125–1300) (in Spanish). León: Centro de Estudios e investigación «San Isidoro». ISBN 978-84-87667-88-6.
- Domínguez Sánchez, Santiago (2000). Colección documental del Monasterio de Santa María de Carbajal (1093–1461) (in Spanish). León: Centro de Estudios e investigación «San Isidoro». ISBN 84-87667-42-2.
- Gómez Bajo, María del Carmen (1993). Documentación medieval del Monasterio de San Andrés de Vega de Espinareda (León) (Siglos XII-XIV) (in Spanish). Salamanca: Ediciones Universidad de Salamanca. ISBN 84-7481-731-5.
- Herrero Jiménez, Mauricio (2003). Colección documental del Monasterio de Villaverde de Sandoval (1132–1500) (in Spanish). León: Centro de Estudios e investigación «San Isidoro». ISBN 9788487667619. Archived from the original on 2015-09-24.
