= Alonso Ramírez =

Alonso Ramírez may refer to:

- Alonso Ramírez Vergara (fl. 1594-1602), Roman Catholic prelate in Peru
- Alonso Ramírez (ecologist), Costa Rican ecologist and professor
- Alonso Ramírez (footballer) (born 2001), Mexican footballer
- Alonso Ramírez (pirate), freebooter that accidentally circunavigated the globe during the Golden Age of Piracy
- The Misfortunes of Alonso Ramírez, 1690 book by Mexican writer Carlos de Sigüenza y Góngora based on the pirate's testimony of his voyage

== See also ==
- Alfonso Ramírez (disambiguation)
