= Alfonso Ramírez (count) =

Spanish nobleman

Alfonso Ramírez (fl. 1150–1185) was a Spanish nobleman of the Kingdom of León, who ruled the Bierzo intermittently between 1167 and his death.

He was the son of Ramiro Froilaz and Inés (Agnes), who was "descended from the kings of France" according to her epitaph. He married Teresa, a daughter of Álvaro Rodríguez and Sancha Fernández de Traba. The couple had a daughter, Inés, and a son, Rodrigo. Alfonso is first mentioned in the historical record in a document dated 22 May 1150. On 22 September, Ramiro ceded to his sons Alfonso and Froila the arras (bridal gift) he never gave their mother.

By 13 May 1167 Alfonso's father had handed over part of the Bierzo to him. By 15 January 1170 he was in complete control of the Bierzo. By 20 January Alfonso could boast the title count (Latin comes), the highest rank granted in the kingdom. Shortly after this the tenencia of the Bierzo was revoked. He briefly governed it again in July 1178, but in September he was sine terra, without land. He then governed it for the third and longest time from 18 August 1180 until 12 October 1185. He died shortly thereafter. At various times he also held the tenencias of Valcárcel (1169), Villabuena (1170), Asturias de Oviedo (1170–71), Ciudad Rodrigo (1177–78), Salamanca (1177–78), Riaño (1181–83), Aguilar de Esla (1182), Ulver (1182–85), Valdeorras (1182–83), and Astorga (1185). He is also known to have made a donation to the Hospitallers on 8 March 1184.
