= Alfonso Ramírez =

Alfonso Ramírez may refer to:

- Alfonso Ramírez (count) (died 1185), medieval governor of the Bierzo
- Alfonso Ramírez de la Fuente (1918–1995), Chilean politician
- Alfonso Ramírez Cuéllar (born 1959), Mexican politician
- Alfonso Ramírez (boxer), Mexican boxer, Boxing at the 1968 Summer Olympics
- Alfonso Lastras Ramírez (1924–1999), Mexican politician
