= Valcárcel =

Valcárcel is a surname. Notable people with the surname include:

- Alejandro Rodríguez de Valcárcel (1917–1976), Francoist Spanish politician
- Kitín Muñoz y Valcárcel (born 1958), Spanish navigator, scientist and sociological explorer
- Aurelio Valcárcel Carroll, television producer and director associated with the Telemundo television network
- Carlos Valcárcel (born 1981), boxer from Puerto Rico, competitor at the 2000 Summer Olympics in Sydney, Australia
- Eleazar Huerta Valcárcel (1903–1974), Spanish lawyer and politician
- Gisela Valcárcel (born 1963), Peruvian television hostess, actress and businesswoman
- Nate Valcarcel (born 2002), American football player
- Ramón Luis Valcárcel (born 1954), Spanish politician, president of the Autonomous Community of the Region of Murcia from 1995 to 2014

== See also ==
- Valcarcelia
- Balcarce
- Valcele
