= Viñón =

- Parish
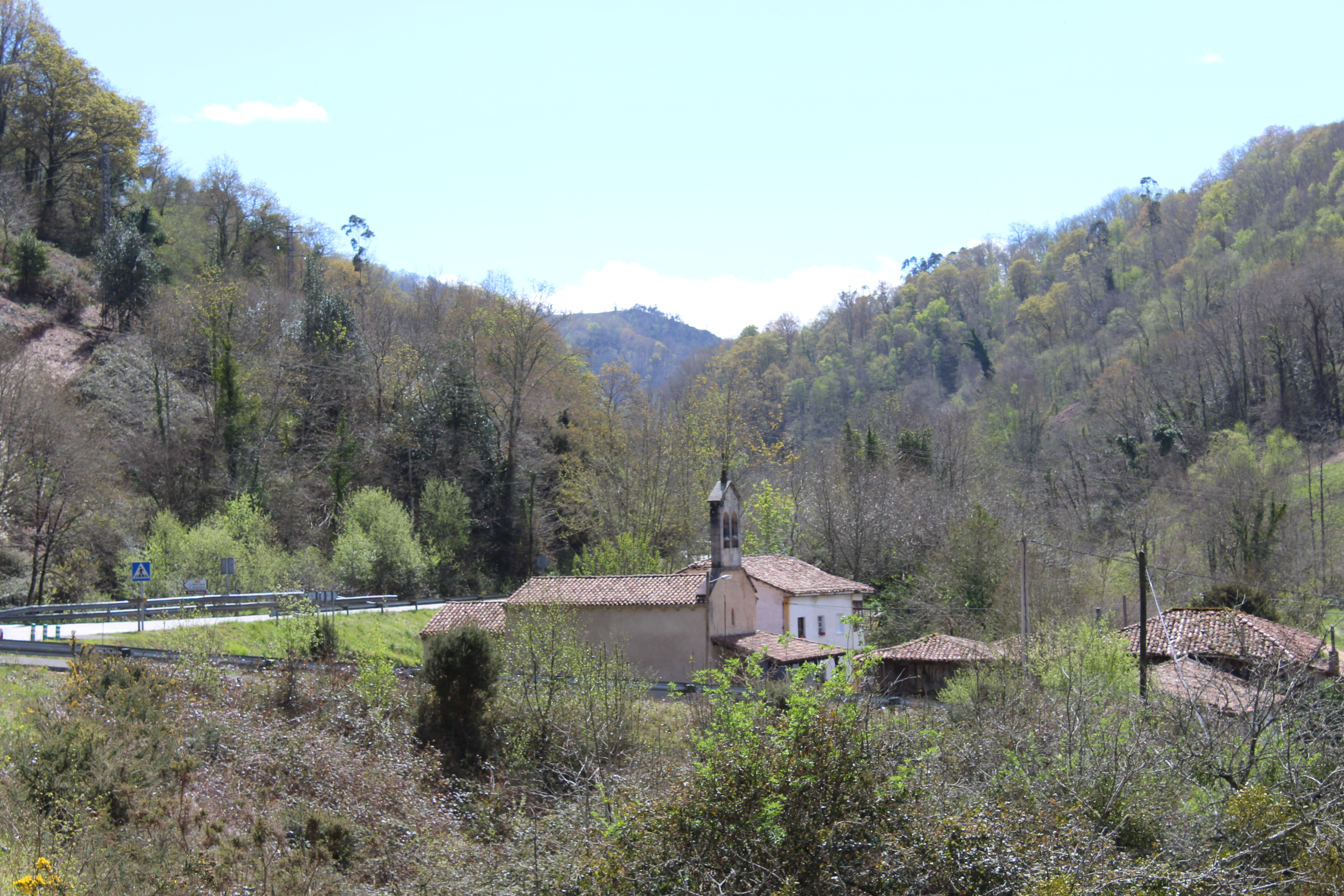

- Location within Spain
- Country: Spain
- Autonomous community: Asturias
- Province: Asturias
- Municipality: Cabranes

Viñón is one of six parishes (administrative divisions) in Cabranes, a municipality within the province and autonomous community of Asturias, in northern Spain.

It is 6.26 km^{2} (2.42 sq mi) in size with a population of 199 (INE 2005).

== Villages ==
- d'Arboleya
- Ñao
- La Puerte
- Valbuena
- Viñón
