= Torazu =

- Parish
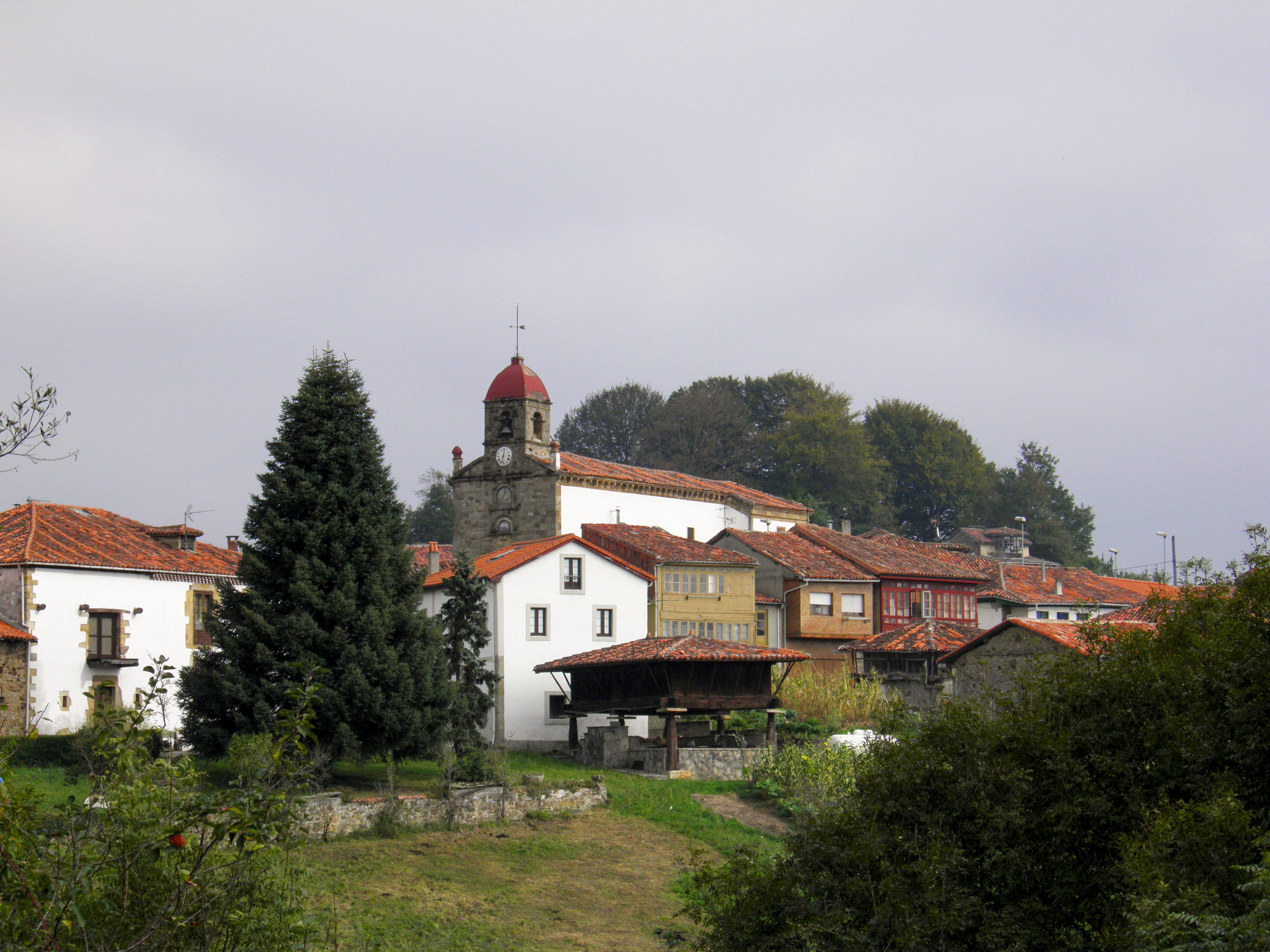

- Location within Spain
- Country: Spain
- Autonomous community: Asturias
- Province: Asturias
- Municipality: Cabranes

Torazu (Spanish: Torazo) is one of six parishes (administrative divisions) in Cabranes, a municipality within the province and autonomous community of Asturias, in northern Spain.

It is 8.36 km^{2} (3.23 sq mi) in size with a population of 260 (INE 2005).

== Villages ==
- Castiellu
- Cervera
- La Cotariella
- Miangues
- La Parte
- Peñella
- La Rebollada
- Torazu
