= Cabranes =

- Municipality
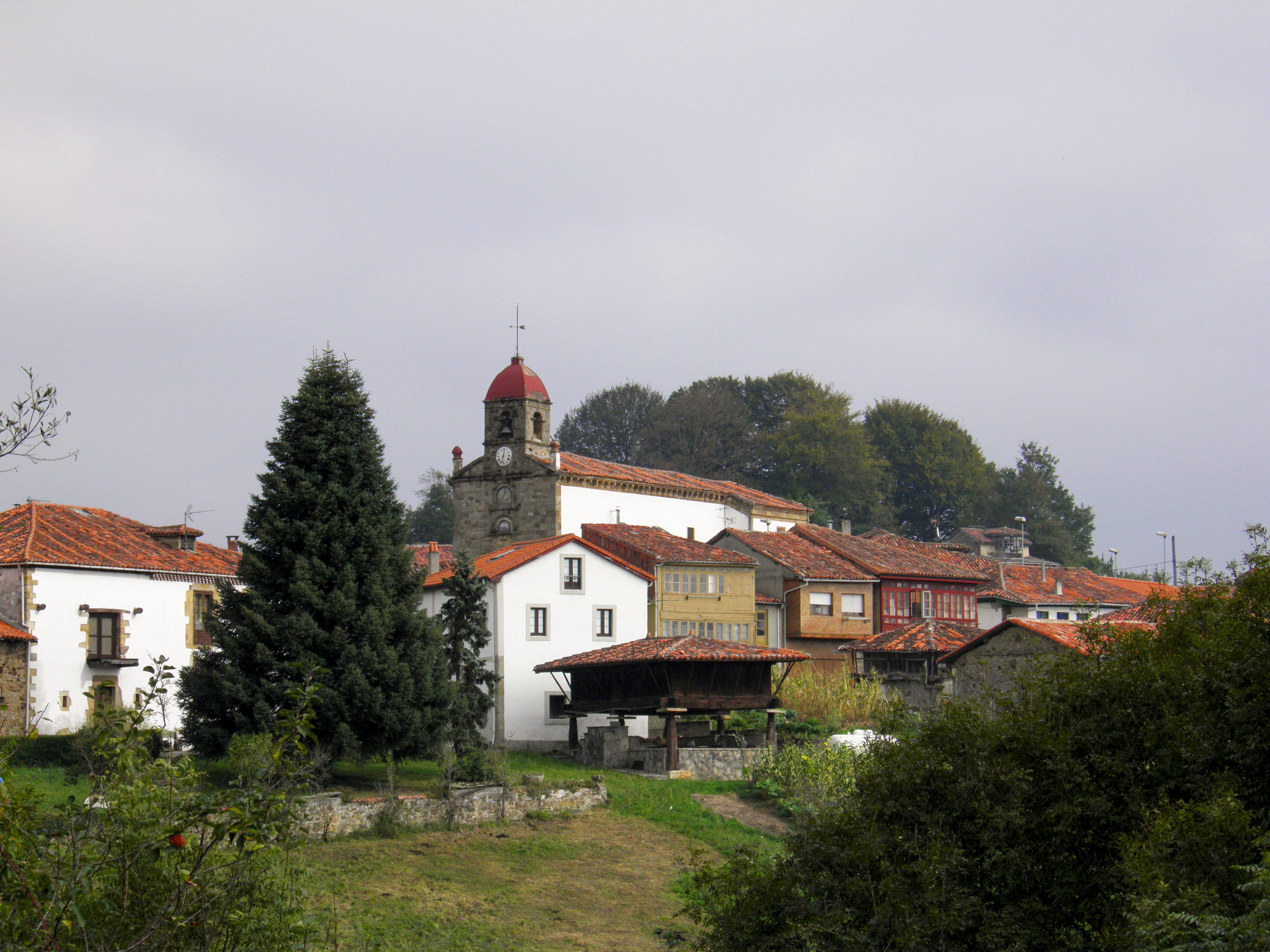
- Torazu, Cabranes

- Flag Coat of arms

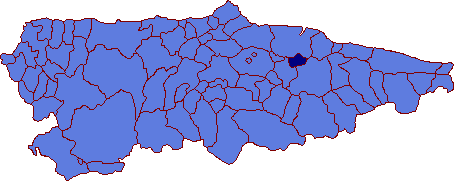

- Location in Spain
- Coordinates: 43°25′N 5°24′W
- Country: Spain
- Autonomous community: Asturias
- Province: Asturias
- Comarca: Oviedo
- Judicial district: Piloña
- Capital: Santolaya

Government
  - Alcalde: Gerardo Fabián Fernández (PSOE)

Area
  - Total: 38.31 km^{2} (14.79 sq mi)
- Highest elevation: 581 m (1,906 ft)

Population (2023)
  - Total: 1,105
  - Density: 28.84/km^{2} (74.70/sq mi)
- Demonym: cabraniego/a
- Time zone: UTC+1 (CET)
  - Summer (DST): UTC+2 (CEST)
- Postal code: 33310

Cabranes is a municipality in the autonomous community of Asturias. As of 2023, it had a population of 1,105 spread between its six parishes: Fresnéu, Graméu, Pandenes, Santolaya, Torazu, and Viñón. Cabranes has a rugged, yet not mountainous, terrain, with its economy focused on cattle and apple farming. At just over 38 km^{2} in area, the municipality is among the smallest in Asturias.

== History ==
There is little mention of Cabranes in written history until the 13th century, although archeological vestiges prove inhabitance of the area before that time. The construction of the monastery of Valdedios was a notable event during the period; the municipality as a whole continued to remain relatively unnoteworthy due to its rural nature. Cabranes developed a large monastic population in the following centuries. Ultimately, the municipality failed to modernize significantly throughout its existence, and the municipality was mostly unaffected by major occurrences in Spain, such as the Civil War. Cabranes has suffered from a continuously declining population due to emigration and an aging population, similarly to many other municipalities in Asturias.

== Art ==
Due to the municipality's historically high number of "Indianos," or Spaniards who emigrated to Latin America and later returned, there is a rich and diverse civil architecture. Notable among the buildings are the schools of Viñón and Santolaya and the chalet of Alfonso San Feliz. There are also many religious buildings in the region, such as the church of San Julián de Viñon, which displays a combination of Pre-Roman Asturian and Romanesque architecture. The parish church of Santa Eulalia, from the 15th century, and the church of San Martín el Real, in a mannerist style, are also noteworthy.

== Politics ==
The current mayor is Gerardo Fabián Fernández (FSA-PSOE).

Local elections
Party/List	1979	1983	1987	1991	1995	1999	2003	2007	2011	2015
FSA-PSOE	3	4	2	4	3	3	6	8	8	7
CD / AP / PP	0	7	7	5	6	4	2	1	0	1
UCD / CDS	8	0	0							
URAS						2	1			
FAC									1	1
Total	11	11	9	9	9	9	9	9	9	

== See also ==
- List of municipalities in Asturias
