= Balcarce =

Balcarce may refer to:

== People ==
- Antonio González de Balcarce (1774–1819), Argentine military commander
- Juan Ramón Balcarce (1773–1836), Argentine military leader and politician
- Marcos González de Balcarce (1777–1832), Argentine military commander and politician

== Places ==
- Balcarce, Buenos Aires Province, a city in Argentina
- Balcarce Partido, the district surrounding the town of Balcarce

== Food ==
Torta Balcarce, a type of cake specialty of Balcarce, Buenos Aires

== See also ==
- Actinopus balcarce, a species of mygalomorph spiders in the Actinopodidae family
- Sportivo Balcarce, Argentine sports club
