= Santolaya (Cabranes) =

- Parish
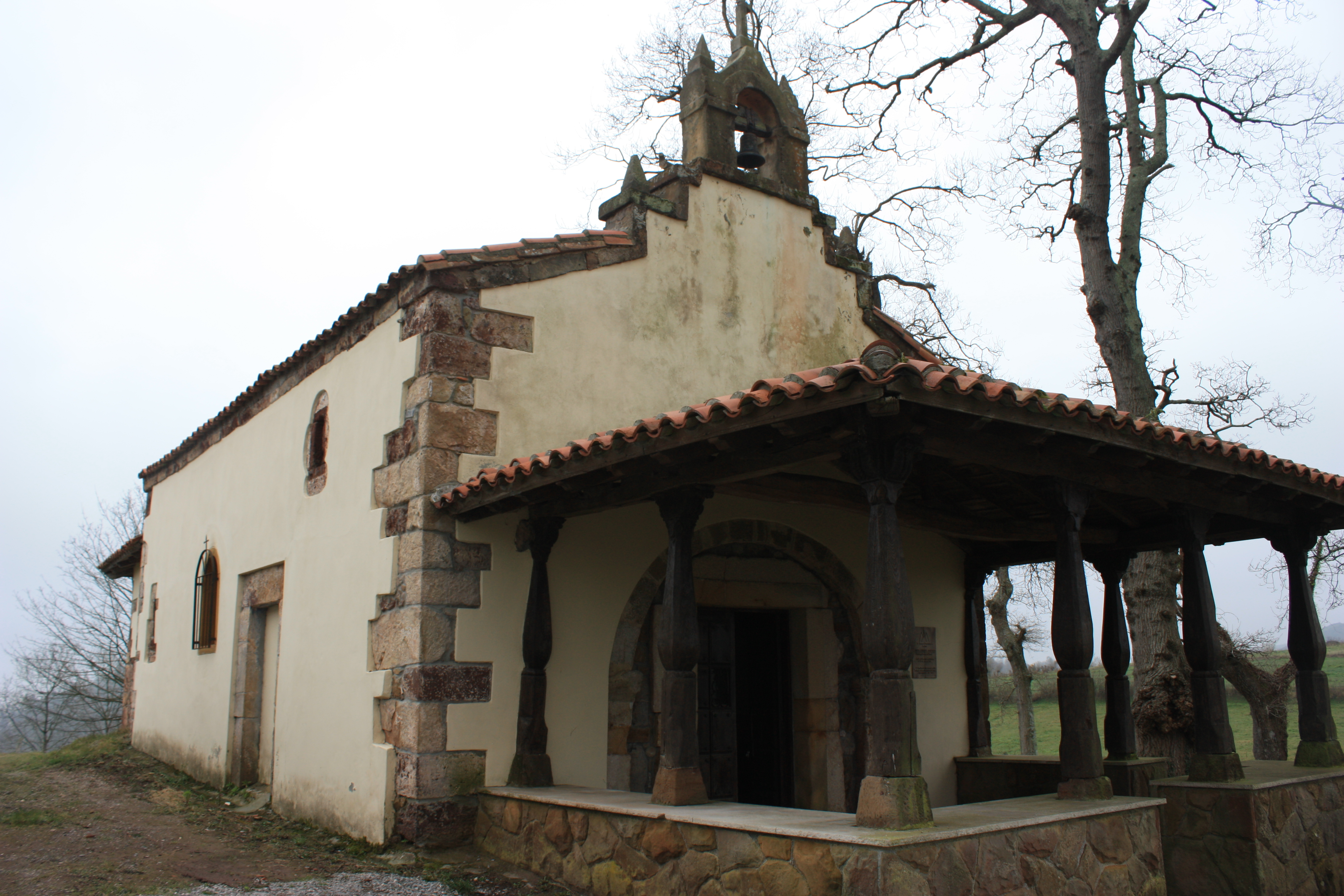

- Location within Spain
- Country: Spain
- Autonomous community: Asturias
- Province: Asturias
- Municipality: Cabranes

Population
  - Total: 336

Santolaya (Spanish: Santa Eulalia) is one of six parishes (administrative divisions) in Cabranes, a municipality within the province and autonomous community of Asturias, in northern Spain.

It is 5.85 km^{2} (2.26 sq mi) in size with a population of 336 (INE 2011).

== Villages ==
- Arboleya
- Arriondu
- Bospolín
- Carabañu
- Güerdies
- Madiéu
- Mases
- Santolaya
- Villanueva

Other minor entities include: Argamia, Artín, El Cantu, La Casa'l Monte, La Casa'l Ríu, El Colláu, Felguerúa, El Fondón, Fonfría, Llamuñu, La Llana, La Llantada, La Llavona, La Obra, Oles, L'Ordinayu, El Préstamu, La Quintana, La Rozada, Sendín, La Soma, Les Vegues and La Viña.
