= Pandenes =

- Parish
- Location within Spain
- Country: Spain
- Autonomous community: Asturias
- Province: Asturias
- Municipality: Cabranes

Population
  - Total: 77

Pandenes is one of six parishes (administrative divisions) in Cabranes, a municipality within the province and autonomous community of Asturias, in northern Spain.

It is 5.14 km^{2} (1.98 sq mi) in size with a population of 77 (INE 2011).

== Villages ==
- Pandenes
- Los Villares
