= Graméu =

- Parish
- Location within Spain
- Country: Spain
- Autonomous community: Asturias
- Province: Asturias
- Municipality: Cabranes

Population
  - Total: 40

Graméu (Spanish: Gramedo) is one of six parishes (administrative divisions) in Cabranes, a municipality within the province and autonomous community of Asturias, in northern Spain.

It is 1.61 km^{2} (0.62 sq mi) in size with a population of 40 (INE 2011).

== Villages ==
- Xiranes (population 24)
- Graméu (population 16)
