= Postre Balcarce =

Argentine cake

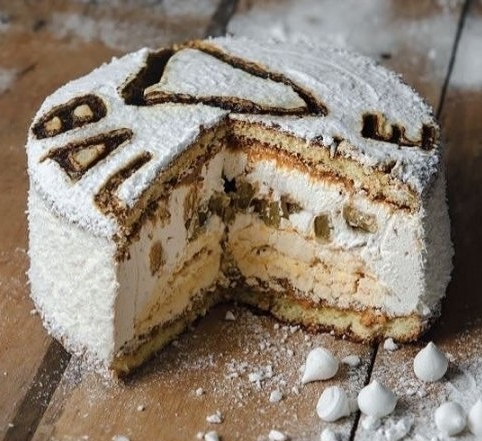
- Alternative names: Balcarce dessert
- Type: Cake
- Place of origin: Argentina
- Region or state: Balcarce, Buenos Aires
- Created by: Guillermo Talou
- Main ingredients: Sponge cake, meringue, Dulce de leche, Creme Chantilly, praline, vanilla extract, nuts, grated coconut
- Similar dishes: Imperial ruso

The Postre Balcarce or Balcarce dessert is a cake specialty originally from Balcarce, Argentina. Since 1958 it is the flagship product of the food company of the same name, Balcarce, from Mar del Plata.

== History ==
The cake originated in 1950 in the "Paris" confectionery which was located in Balcarce and owned by Guillermo Talou, who created the dessert. It was originally named "Imperial", because it was based upon another dessert very popular in Argentina, the "Imperial Ruso". The brand was sold in 1958 to a different company, Dondero hnos. from Mar del Plata, which started the massive production of the dessert under the name "Balcarce", as a tribute to the recipe's birthplace. The company became eventually known to the public after its best selling product, and in consequence the firm adopted the trade name of "Postres Balcarce". The original dessert recipe is still produced in the town of Balcarce by the confectionary “Comoantes”. The desserts made in Mar del Plata used to be branded with a seal in the shape of a sea lion, while those produced in Balcarce are marked with a "C" for "Comoantes".

== The cake ==
The cake is typically composed of a sponge cake with layers of dulce de leche, crushed nuts, meringue, whipped cream, praline and desiccated coconut. Whipped cream, powdered sugar, and desiccated coconut are used to cover the exterior of the cake which may then be decorated with meringue shells and additional crushed nuts.

== See also ==
- List of Argentine sweets and desserts
