= Alonso Ramírez (pirate) =

Puerto Rican pirate (1662–???)

- Born: c. 1662; San Juan, Puerto Rico
- Died: Date unknown Location unknown
- Spouse: Francisca Xaviera (m. 1682; died 1683)
- Piratical career
- Type: Pirate
- Rank: Boatswain; Captain
- Base of operations: Caribbean Sea
- Commands: Unidentified Malaysian frigate
- Wealth: At least 500 pieces of eight

Alonso Ramírez (born c. 1662, date of death unknown) was a sailor from San Juan, Puerto Rico, who was press-ganged into the crew of the English privateer William Dampier and subsequently became the first known person from the Americas to circumnavigate the world. His account of the voyage formed the basis of The Misfortunes of Alonso Ramírez, published by Carlos de Sigüenza y Góngora in 1690, which became widely popular and is often regarded as the first historical novel of the Americas.

A criollo born in the coastal capital of Puerto Rico, Ramírez's life took a turn for the worse early in his life, losing his wife in childbirth and prompting him to leave the Americas altogether. Ramírez arrived at the Philippines, then a Spanish colony in Asia, where he worked as a merchant sailor. Ambushed and taken aboard Dampier's flagship as its boatswain, he traveled with them through Asia, Oceania and Africa before going off on his own after arriving at the mouth of the Amazon. As captain of a frigate previously captured by Dampier, he found his way back to Yucatán before being shipwrecked.

Due to the sensational nature of the account and the serendipitous circumstances that allowed his survival, the existence of Ramírez was widely speculated to be a fictional creation for 317 years, until historical research validated several details of his account. Modern academics have noted that the account seems to have been expurgated, in which the Sigüenza y Góngora is complicit to an extent, arguing that several aspects of the narrative conveniently avoided incriminating details and that Ramírez' appearance indicated participation in numerous naval engagements. They suspect that the frigate was likely operating as a pirate vessel with Ramírez as its captain upon his return to the Caribbean, goading the Spanish authorities into reimbursing his sunken loot while avoiding punishment, retiring comfortably and living off the deception until his death.

== Early life ==
=== Childhood at San Juan ===
Ramírez opened his account by establishing his "homeland as the city of San Juan of Puerto Rico". Ramírez took great pride in his Catholic faith and participated in the discrimination against Protestants that was widespread throughout the Spanish Main, considering them heretical. In his declaration, Ramírez gives his perception of the 17th Century city of San Juan and the socioeconomic dynamics of the era. He remembers the "beauty of its bay", praises the "incomparable" Castillo San Felipe del Morro (then still incomplete) and the other forts protecting Old San Juan. He frames its place within the Empire by noting that at the time the quality of water at Aguada made it famous in New Spain. Ramírez makes reference to the Taino name for the island, Borinquen, and gives the history of the island to that point, citing the gold deposits that were responsible for its name and the cocoa economy that followed. He notes that the cultural extinction and decimation of the natives was in part responsible for the population becoming poorer once hurricanes destroyed the plants, since there was a lack of workers.

His parents were poor at the time of his birth, his mother was a local from San Juan named Ana Ramírez, from whom he took his last name. His father was an Andalusian carpenter, though he was not sure of his exact birthplace, named Lucas de Villanueva. Ramírez was taught the craft from a very early age, but quickly grew unsatisfied with this line of work. Fearing that it would be insufficient to escape from poverty and hoping for a better life, he chose to leave Puerto Rico in search of fortune.

=== Traveling abroad and sailing ===
At age 13, Ramírez boarded a hulk captained by a sailor named Juan del Corcho, with a stop at Havana. He was given the rank of boatswain among the crew and, despite considering it better and easier than crafting wood, was skeptical that it was capable of providing good fortune in the long run. From Havana, the vessel traveled to San Juan de Ulúa. Ramírez left the crew there, traveling to Puebla (then known as Puebla de los Ángeles), experiencing difficulty with the harsh weather that he had not faced during his island upbringing. He opted to stay there and try to find more lucrative opportunities than those of his ship, finding himself once again working as the apprentice of a carpenter. After six month, Ramírez was lamenting his decision to go abroad, having experienced worse quality of life than at San Juan.

Hopeful that nobleman Luis Ramírez would offer a better fate due to his blood relation to his mother, Ramírez left for the city of Huasca de Ocampo. However, after a long journey the aristocrat denied having any knowledge of their kinship and sent him on his way. He was then employed by a merchant named Juan López who, among his clients, counted the native tribes of the region. Once again, Ramírez was unsatisfied with the work, citing that the mountain trails only offered ample chance to be scared at the threat of landslides and numerous hazards of other kinds. With Lopez, he went as far as Guatemala, bartering and trading along the way. Arriving at Talistaca, the merchant fell gravely ill and was expected to die. While Lopez recovered, Ramírez spent time fantasizing about better and more lucrative lines of work. Upon arriving at Cuicatlán, the merchant suffered a fatal bout of the same illness. Ramírez received some reward from Lopez's inheritors, but considered it capricious, and returned to Puebla de los Angeles. There he was unable to find work, he chose to find a home at Mexico by marrying a noble orphan named Francisca Xavier, who was related to the church's dean. His wife died in child birth eight months later, after which he returned to Puebla de los Angeles and began working under carpenter Esteban Gutierrez. Unable to gain much money and depressed, Ramírez boarded the galleon Santa Rosa at Acapulco in 1682 aboard which he witnessed numerous Pacific islands.

Arriving at Cavite, he criticized the locals for being unreceptive and the port town for its weather, dangerous landscape and lack of fresh water. At Manila, Ramírez found a city where life was affordable and supplies available. As such, he decided to become a sailor and operate out of Cavite, a line of work that took him to Indian ports which he described as constantly requested and lucrative. Despite this, Ramírez expressed disgust at the religious practices there, calling the citizens "moors and gentiles" and lamenting that Catholicism wasn't practiced. He also traveled to Batavia, expressing fascination at the presence of international merchants and a large variety of merchandise and the Portuguese port of Macau.

== Piracy and circumnavigation ==
=== Captured by pirates ===
Governor Gabriel de Cuzalaegui commissioned Ramírez as captain of a frigate with a crew of 25 men to bring provisions to Cavite from Ilocos. Ramírez complained that they were only give four short boarding pikes and two badly damaged muskets with five bullets for defense. On the way back, they noticed two vessels off Mariveles and were pursued by two small ships shortly afterwards. Despite ordering his men to stations, it became evident that the attackers were better equipped and the frigate was being peppered by shots. Eventually, the two larger vessels joined the engagement and the frigate was boarded by around fifty British pirates, who mocked them for the poor arsenal provided by the Spanish Crown.

As the captain of the frigate, Ramírez was taken aboard the flagship and introduced to the pirate captain, who received him with a joy that he considered hypocritical. Upon being queried about the wealth of the region, he feigned ignorance. When asked if their vessel could be supplied at Capones Island, Ramírez lied and said that the island was uninhabited as a ruse to have his captors ambushed. The pirate flotilla had two well provisioned ships, both armed with eight cannon and a large number of cutlasses, blunderbusses, harpoons, grenades and axes. One of them was commanded by master Bel and had a crew of 80, while the other was captained by Dunkin who had 70 sailors. (Note: Due to Ramírez's unfamiliarity with the English language, he Hispanized the pronunciation and spelling of the names of several members of the crew. "Bel" is believed to refer to Walter Berd and "Donkin" to Duncan Mackintosh, who captained the Good Hope.) Ramírez was tied to the mast and interrogated again while he and his crew were tortured. His Indian quartermaster revealed that Capones Island was actually inhabited and that Ramírez was an experienced sailor, so the pirates gave Ramírez a beating.

=== The Pacific and Asia ===
Arriving at Côn Đảo, the Spanish frigate was sacked and set on fire. (Note: Despite not being directly stated, it is believed that around this time Ramírez changed ships and boarded the Good Hope.) The local natives (identified as belonging to the Vietnamese ethnic groups from the Cochinchina) allowed the pirates to resupply and traded with them, beginning a stay of four months. Upon leaving, they killed most of the populace, ransacked and torched the village before setting sail. Despite providing a detailed account, Ramírez claims that he did not participate in the pillaging, always staying on the flagship. He went on to call the pirates "beasts" due to supposedly taking the charred arm of one of their victims and shared it among themselves in an act of cannibalism, before offering him a piece. Ramírez denies eating it, with his host being distracted by a toast.

Off the coast of Cambodia, they captured a prize which they stripped and set loose before leaving the crew at land. Anchoring at Hon Khoai island, they resupplied and Ramírez and his crew were told to make ropes with vegetation. There, the pirates captured a Siamese and two Portuguese vessels, all of them well supplied and carrying considerable treasure. Their crews were marooned, along some of the Spanish. At Siantan Island, they attacked the natives and took livestock and other provisions. After torching a settlement at the Tambelan Islands, they sailed to Borneo where they docked at Sukadana and requested permission from the governor to trade. After scouting the place for three days, the pirates launched a midnight attack plundering the Governor's House and taking him and others hostage, before taking what they could from the rest of the town before torching it and the ships docked there. The pirates took with them a considerable amount of diamonds and jewels, some of which Bel supposedly kept in his hat. After resupplying and dropping the hostages on land, they captured two "moor" vessels off the Bengal region, torching them and killing several in the process.

=== Oceania and Africa ===
By this time, Ramírez noted that the pirate flotilla had been uncontested in all its naval engagements, citing knowledge that they were being hunted down. They soon found four well-armed Dutch warships, fleeing in the middle of the night and sailing to Aur Island, where they resupplied. Afraid of this development, the pirates escaped the area through the Singapore Strait, sailing as fast as possible but making a stop to board a frigate. The manned the ship with 14 armed sailors and ten cannons, assimilating it into the flotilla. The pirates sailed for weeks, eventually finding their way to Australia, finding unoccupied camps and ample food and water. Ramírez was placed in charge of fixing sails and cooking meat. After four months, the pirates set sail to Madagascar where after bartering for some livestock they also traded with a British merchant.

Ramírez states that the pirates were going to leave him and the Spanish left behind at Madagascar, but he pled them not to making reference to his service and promising to offer servitude as if he was a slave, continued aboard. Relieved, he effusively thanked them. Ramírez established some degree of friendship with some of the crew, despite accusing them of being racist and considering him a coward due to his ethnicity, particularly the constable "Nicpat" and boatswain "Dick". (Note: "Nicpat" likely refers to Nick Burton, master gunner of the Good Hope.) He claims that one of the crew, named Cornelio, approached him about organizing a mutiny, which never materialized. This led to Ramírez being accused of planning it, increasing the security around him. Taken to the Captain's Cabin, Ramírez swore that Cornelio was the one planning the mutiny, after which "Bel" pardoned him at the behest of "Nicpat". The pirates sailed towards Cape Hope, from where they continued sailing along the coast for a month and a half.

=== Return to the Americas ===
Afterwards, the flotilla began an intercontinental voyage, with Brazil as its next destination. Arriving twenty-five days afterwards, sailing for two weeks and sending men to land twice to trade for freshwater. Afterwards, the flotilla came upon the mouth of the Amazon River. Ramírez claims that the pirates then held a vote on what to do with him and the Spaniards Juan de Casas, Juan Pinto, Marcos de la Cruz, Francisco de la Cruz, Juan Díaz, Malabar and a slave named Pedro. According to him, three groups emerged, a majority one that voted to have them killed, another that voted to maroon them and a third -composed by "Nicpat", "Dick", Captain Duncan and his close circle- who opposed both and felt that those options were unwarranted. Ramírez claims that the pirates almost came to blows, before ultimately giving him control of the frigate captured at the Singapore Straight and the Spaniards as his crew.

He stated that the ship was then emptied of cargo and that he was forced to formally thank every one of the outlaws, receiving an astrolabe, Dutch rutter, a limited amount of water and rice and a compass. He claims that "Nicpat" secretly told him that he had left behind supplies, including four barrels of powder, medical equipment and many cannonballs. Ramírez claims that the pirates then told him to only sail in Spanish waters, or that they would kill him if they ever found him again. With a mocking goodbye, he was supposedly set on his way. Ramírez says that it took some time to consider himself a free man and that the first thing that the crew did was lifting a prayer.

=== Lost in the Caribbean ===
Ramírez claims that they were lost from the beginning, unfamiliar with their current location or their surroundings. Sailing for six days, they saw land but continued onwards until they stumbled upon three smaller islands inhabited by birds. Ramírez and Juan de Casas took a row boat and took some supplies, after which they continued to Trinidad. There, the frigate encountered a group of twenty British vessels, fleeing North and continuing on that path for a day. Afterwards they sailed West, coming upon Barbados, but left upon stumbling upon a canoe with six British men. Heading East, Ramírez states that he did not recognize any of these islands and that he expected all to be inhabited by enemies. The crew consumed most of its supplies, while continuing Northeast. Arriving at Guadeloupe, the frigate left without bartering after being queried about their home port and destination. The crew, most of whom were nonwhite Spaniards, feared that the French there would capture and make them slaves.

Ramírez emphasized in his declaration that he was not familiar with the Lesser Antilles and the Caribbean at large due to never traveling there from San Juan during his youth. They sailed North and then Northeast, stumbling upon Barbuda and Antigua, making a turn Northwest to find Saint Barthélemy and Saint Martin. Ramírez continued sailing West, from which he saw the south coast of Hispaniola about six leagues away, claiming that it was too far to dock. After noticing Beata Island and Alto Velo Island, frigate spent several days sailing southwest, before traveling back northwest. Ramírez continued this route until he found Jamaica, noting that the town of Port Royal was full of ships including two British sloops that were aware of their presence. The frigate then sailed South, West and Northwest, eventually coming upon Grand Cayman, from where another British sloop emerged to scout them. Following a futile attempt to gain its attention afterwards, Ramírez left once his crew grew restless at the presence of the Union Jack. Frustrated and with supplies reduced to what could be fished and slightly more than a small barrel of fresh water, Ramírez sailed West and then Southwest with the intention of finding a safe dock.

=== Shipwreck and final stretch ===
Coming upon a sandbank with some stones, the frigate dropped anchor. However, that night the wind picked up, the tide roared and the rope snapped, sending Ramírez into a frenzy to sail to a barren cape that was visible from there. With morale dropping and thirst increasing, Ramírez swam to the frigate once the weather improved three days later, extracted an ax and what he considered useful to start a campfire. Taking another plunge, he retrieved the small water barrel. The crew tore down some palms, eating their pulp and making fire wood, discovering small sources of fresh water. Ramírez and Juan de Casas returned to the frigate, taking with them a canoe, blunderbusses, ammunition, powder and its sails, among other things. After improvising a barrack, they walked South in search of people. After finding some abandoned huts they found a river blocking their progress and returned to the camp, wasting four days on the road. Within forty eight hours, the fresh water evaporated and the crew became ill, being saved by rainfall after five days.

Most of the sailors refused to leave camp, until a mosquito infestation became unbearable after a month of eating palm pulp and crabs. Making one final visit to the frigate, Ramírez fired the cannons twice in an attempt to attract the attention of anyone nearby. He suffered an accident where some ammunition ignited and burned part of his face, hair, chest and leg. Ramírez urged his crew that they needed assistance, and arming themselves they left the shipwrecked frigate behind heading North. Malnourished and finding scant water sources, the men continued searching for civilization, but Francisco de la Cruz, Antonio González died on the journey. Stumbling upon a river and some mangroves, the group found an animal that Ramírez called a "deformed bear", which after being shot charged at him before being killed by the crew. (Note: This was either a southern tamandua or simply an attempt to explain away the true origin of the multiple scars scattered throughout his body.) They eventually came upon a stony cape, where he rested while entertaining ideas that they had arrived at Florida, fearing that the natives would kill them. The crew noticed some naked men near the coast, which Ramírez startled by walking towards them brandishing a blunderbuss. The natives were searching amber for their master, Juan González, informing him that they were at Bacalar in Yucatán and feeding the sailors. Joining the entourage, they visited Mesoamerican ruins where ancient wells could be found and ambushed a canoe to take the natives captive, offering them as "gifts" to the Church at Tihosuco at the behest of González. They remained there eight days, during which they ate and recovered.

Ramírez left the town with a letter for the Vicar of Tixcacal, with the mayors of Valladolid (Francisco de Zelerun and Ziphirino de Castro) being informed beforehand of his arrival. Of the two functionaries, De Castro was a military man and claimed the frigate and its cargo on the name of the Crusades. A local encomendero, Melchor Pacheco, received a rusted kris after becoming fixated by it, as the account gathered him celebrity in the town. This act was said by Ramírez to have awakened the suspicions of Ceferino. Wanting to make a claim for the cargo, he was sent to Mérida, arriving there on December 8, 1689, and being housed in a building for foreigners with little to eat. Ramírez met governor Juan Joseph de la Barcena, who heard his plight. After once again narrating his account to sergeant mayor Francisco Guerreo and notary Bernardo Sabido, he was released and sold Pedro for 300 pieces of eight.

Knowing that the frigate was going to be unloaded, Ramírez tried to travel back to Valladolid, but was prevented from doing so by order of De Castro, who threatened to declare him a traitor to the Crown. Returning to Mérida, and upon arriving there following the Easter celebrations, learned that the Viceroy of New Spain, Gaspar de la Cerda Silva y Mendoza, was summoning him in response to his claim. On April 7, 1690, Ramírez arrived to Campeche, from where he boarded a sloop to Veracruz. From there he traveled to Mexico City to meet the viceroy, who referred him to Sigüenza y Góngora to write his narrative down. Ramírez expressed that he intended to entertain whoever read his misadventures, despite emphasizing they nearly killed him. He felt a necessity to affirm that he did not try to gain sympathy by publishing these claims, nor that he had fallen victim to his pain.

That Ramírez had circumnavigated the globe during his travels was established as fact from the beginning of his document. Emphasizing the miserable nature of his statements, the author gives full credit to all of the claims made by Ramírez, directly requesting intersection by the Viceroy. With a decree, Ramírez received financial aid from royal factor Sebastián de Guzmán y Córdova. The Viceroy also issued additional decrees ordering the Armada de Barlovento to provide him with work and the governor of Yucatán to make sure that all of the frigate's cargo was returned to him. Juan Enrique Barroto, artillery captain of the fleet, accompanied him on his way back to Veracruz free of charge.

The Crown requested Francisco de Ayerra Santa María, chaplain of Convento Real de Jesús María at Mexico, to oversee the potential censorship of the relation of the events as narrated to the author. By his own admission, the functionary was enthralled by the narrative, both due to the nature of the content and the way in which they were presented in the document. As such, he licensed publishing it without censoring any part of the original manuscript on June 26, 1690. Ayerra Santa María emphasizes the historicity of the account and notes that, to the best of his knowledge, the author only "polished" the narrative with his verbose prose. Several academics, including Marcelino Menéndez y Pelayo, Cayetano Coll y Toste, Concha Meléndez, Josefina Rivera de Álvarez and Manuel Álvarez Nazario subscribed to this theory, despite not possessing confirmation during their lifetimes.

== Histographical analysis ==
=== Debate on the historic validity of the account ===
The nature of Ramirez's account, full of intrigue and details that border on self-deprecation, self-righteousness that bordered on heroism and dark tones led to the public perception that he had, in fact, been a creation of Sigüenza y Góngora.The book was, for most of its existence, catalogued as a fictional picaresque novel by literature academics, who did not possess the professional expertise to authenticate its content as historical. The book became a hit during the 20th century when republished as part of a compendium of peculiar books by Pedro Vindel in 1902. It's timing meant that it joined a host of similar works in the popular surge of the buccaneer era of literature and film industry. Though the importance of the account was recognized, it was within the context of its role as a Latin American novel within the colonial context, not for the actions of its lead. The book was republished several times throughout the 20th century, including in his native Puerto Rico in 1944.

Authors such as J. S. Cummins and Alan Soons noted how Sigüenza y Góngora in tongue-in-cheek manner dismisses his geographic knowledge, speculating that as a simple sailor he provided uncredited scientific verification to the details shared with him. Historian Francisco Vidargas was among the first to note that as an objectivist, all of Sigüenza y Góngora's works strived to come as close as possible to an "objective truth" that prevailed over the benefits of including a fictional "enchantment" to them. Estelle Irizarry studied the lexicography of the account and found that it was heterogeneous, supporting the notion that the author served as amanuensis to Ramírez. Several of the figures and events described in the account were verified by Cummins, Soons and Bryant in their republished versions, hinting that at least the setting as described was historically accurate. Some tertiary figures, such as Ceferino de Castro, were also confirmed to have been at the place and time that the narrative describes, performing the tasks that are attributed to them in the text.

=== Establishing the existence of Ramírez ===
The process of reestablishing the actual existence of Ramírez himself as a real individual and retrieving what could be historically verified of his declaration did not begin in earnest until the 21st century. The decadence of the last years of the Asturian dynasty was used by Antonio Peña Izquierdo to frame the dichotomy between the brothers and the Peninsular establishment. By researching the correspondence between the Portocarrero y Palma and Infantado y Galve families, two compering factions whose power extended from Europe to the Americas the López Lázaro noted that his fortuitous arrival became an important development for the imperial politics. Within the context of expanding military initiatives that responded to multiple buccaneer attacks throughout the region, the viceroy was being pressured to produce more silver for the Peninsula, while funds for New Spain were being withheld. Ramírez's arrival and status as a victim allowed the viceroy to order the publishing of the account as a book, so it could be easily distributed, and which he sent to the Infantado y Galve as proof that his defense initiatives were warranted. The letter that Gaspar wrote accompanying the document was retrieved by the author from the Archivo de la Casa Ducal de Osuna by the author. In it the viceroy states that, despite recognizing that its content is "odd and peregrine" in nature, he personally met Ramírez in person and heard his plight. (Note: The letter in question states: "Your Excellency, brother, friend, and lord: Enclosed herewith are twenty accounts of the voyage undertaken by Alonso Ramírez, a native of Puerto Rico, from the Philippine Islands to the province of Campeche, where he was lost. Having summoned him to this court, I had him give a statement of the defeat and misfortunes he suffered on such an unprecedented voyage, which, being quite rare and unusual, I am sending to Your Excellency. I have had it printed so that I may send many copies to Your Excellency should you wish to distribute them among your friends, as I am sending it only to the Marquis of Vélez, of which I am informing Your Excellency, whose most excellent person may God preserve for many years, as I need. Mexico City, July 1, 1690. At Your Excellency's feet, your servant and greatest friend, the Count of Galve.")

The correspondence ultimately grants credence to several important aspects of Ramírez's declaration. These include his origin as a native of San Juan, Puerto Rico, his arrival to the Philippines, the voyage that began in Asia and led to him wrecking the frigate, becoming lost at Campeche and that what Sigüenza y Góngora wrote down was in accord with what he had been told personally. By addressing his brother with candor and familiarity, the viceroy also notes that he held Ramírez's account as veridical, addressing it as "unfortunate" and "a defeat". In 1996, Antonio Lorente Medina argued that documents detailing Juan Enríquez's campaign in 1690-91 hint that Ramírez was among "fourteen officials" that accompanied him. However, the author retracted this assertion in 2017 and the fate of the pirate remains ambiguous. More historical material that proved the existence of Ramírez was unearthed following this initial research, discoveries that took place during the 2010s included the discovery of his marriage certificate to Francisca Xaviera and the confirmation of the shipwreck of his frigate as reported. By 2020, Carlos Martínez Shaw and Marina Alfonso Mola argued that the possibility of the account being fictional "could definitely be considered buried" as more events and historical figures present in it were confirmed as real.

=== Debate about his ethnicity ===
Due to the obscurity of his father's birthplace and his last name being "Villanueva", which was commonly adopted by Sephardic converts following their expulsion from Spain in 1492, historian Estelle Irrizary published academic speculation that Ramírez himself possessed that heritage. Other aspects of his life, such as leaving Puerto Rico to fend on his own at the age of 13, have been associated with the continued and covert practice of the Bar Mitzvah among Crypto-Jews in the Spanish New World. Ramírez's poor self-image as expressed numerous times throughout the text, were interpreted as a reflection of his internal turmoil and conflict over his current Catholic faith and his perception of an incompatible background. As such, this self-exile as he describes his voyage to the Philippines can be interpreted as a purging of those aspects of his heritage that he found unsavory. José Luis Díaz Báez of the University of Puerto Rico offered a rebuttal of this theory, citing that it's unlikely that he left Puerto Rico for Mexico if he was Jewish, since the persecution that they faced there was more intense. The actions of Ramírez throughout the narrative hardly reflect those of a man seeking some type of self-punishment or a willingness to die for his faith. This author also considers that he would have pursued the intervention of the authorities unlikely, knowing well that his heritage would be noted even if not disclosed, putting his life in danger.

=== Everyday life as a pirate ===
Ramírez's account has been cited as one of the few historical accounts to document the mundane aspects of life aboard a freebooting flagship sailing at the height of the Golden Age of Piracy. The tasks assigned in accordance to his lowly place among the crew included cleaning the weapons, make rope, repairing and placing the sails, crafting meols and clothes, crafting and fixing everyday equipment, preparing and storing rice, cooking and taking the wheel. Ramírez claims that when these tasks were failed, they would be lashed, and that they only received a bushel of rice accompanied by a pint of water. Every Saturday he was to work as the crew's barber, a role which he was mediocre at, being punished for it. Every Monday, the captured were made to lash each other for the entertainment of the pirates. He noted that a Sevillian named Miguel was the one responsible for most of his unfortunes, unintentionally documenting an instance of pirate religious conversion and how it affected the acceptance among the crew. Ramírez accused the man of betraying his Catholic faith and adopting the Protestant faith of the British, especially around Christmas and on Sundays, when they would pray. Ramírez makes a profound description of his frigate, illustrating the type of vessel preferred by 17th Century pirates. He states that it was about 33 Castilian codos (45.25 feet) in length, with three outer layers of wood and wide masts made from fine pinewood. The vessel's weaponry, nine iron cannons with over 2,000 cannonballs of four, six and ten pounds. The cargo present within its hull at the time of its loss was characteristic of its piratical use and included eighty copper bars from Japan, "several" Chinese jars, seven elephant tusks, forty blunderbusses, three powder kegs, medicines, surgical instruments and 690,120 kg of iron. At Valladolid, the contents of the frigate became highly sought after, with Ramírez being offered 500 pieces of eight for this cargo.

=== Likelihood that Ramírez was a pirate captain ===
Since the very moment that Ramírez first claimed the contents of the frigate as a sailor, the Spanish authorities suspected that he had been an active participant in the plundering of the cargo. It is due to this very reason and suspecting duplicity in his allegations of being an unwilling member of the crew, that they reclaimed it in the name of the Spanish Inquisition basing their claim on the crusade bull. The viceroy's support ultimately prevented that Ramírez lost everything as a suspected pirate or met a worst fate if found guilty of such an endeavor. However, these suspicions continued to gather support among modern historians who have examined the details of his life between 1687 and 1690. A consensus has emerged among historians positing that Ramírez was far more willing to participate in the pirate lifestyle than he claims and stopped being a prisoner early on, vehemently denying any crime out of self-preservation, and as such was well integrated in its social structure. As such, it is believed that while he is generally truthful when it comes to the events witnessed that did not involve him, he was intentionally obscure concerning his role in the crew and his participation in the pillaging that took place at Asia and Oceania. Due to this assumption, scholars agree that he continued engaging in piracy after parting with the British and commanded his new vessel for these means.

Although the shipwreck of the frigate was historically and later archeologically confirmed in an expedition organized in February 20–22, 2018, Ramírez's claim that the pirates sent them to their death has been disputed by the very researcher responsible for these findings. Buscaglia Salgado cites a number of omissions in his account to argue that it's more likely that the ship was captured on behalf of the Cygnet and then given those that got the prize pursuant to the Pirate's Code as the crew disbanded and fragmented at the Amazon. The author notes that on the way back, the vessel avoided Puerto Rico for unexplained reasons and emphasizes that it's not possible to sail without spotting the island. He argues that Ramírez was most likely made the captain of the frigate as it continued to engage in piracy, noting that the deaths that took place on the crew were not only suspicious, but convenient to his plan, which was to avoid the Spanish West Indies in favor of known pirate havens that flew the Union Jack. Buscaglia Salgado argues that there was no logical reason why the British pirates would let them live and also share a part of the booty if they were considered prisoners being sent to their deaths.

The frigate was small, fast and maneuverable (these characteristics being cornerstones of most piratical vessels during the Golden Age), with Ramírez boasting that it could travel 80 leagues (240 nmi) in a day with favorable winds. Buscaglia Salgado also argues that the archeological evidence actually point towards a larger ship, likely twice the size based on his analysis of a 124-feet piece of hull discovered, which would better accommodate the cargo reclaimed. The cargo that the shipwrecked frigate was carrying at the time of the loss was consistent more damming to his claims of innocence was Ramírez's own appearance, full of scars and burns which he could not explain to Sigüenza y Góngora when queried. These were more consistent with someone that actively participated in boarding other ships than a reluctant member of the crew that spent most of his time in the brig. Antonio Lorente Medina argues that none of the other sailors released ever claimed that they were treated with cruelty by Dampier and that his testimony was given more weight than Cornelius Peterson's, who is known to have been an established pirate, following the mutiny attempt. Martínez and Alonso support this conclusion, arguing that the idea that its extremely unlikely that the pirates would gift Ramírez a vessel unless he was actively part of their culture and well regarded as a freebooter.

== Legacy ==
=== Academic research ===
Ramírez's motivations and the route that his life took has been regarded as a real version of the literary picaresque hero. Multiple aspects of the account have been academically studied, including his customs and attitudes in relation to the era. Fabio López Lázaro argues in an article titled La mentira histórica de un pirata caribeño: El descubrimiento del trasfondo histórico de los Infortunios de Alonso Ramírez (1690) that the academic community "must re-evaluate the creation of the Infortunios as a step in the political and imperial strategies." The author identifies a power struggle between the viceroy, his brother and the Duke of the Infantado Gregorio María de Silva y Mendoza and Archbishop Luis Manuel Fernández de Portocarrero. In 1967, Vallés Formosa argued that the account was a more grounded precursor to other novels in the maritime genre, speculating that Daniel Defoe may have acquired a copy prior to publishing Robinson Crusoe. As the book gathered comparisons to subsequent works by authors such as Jonathan Swift, Robert Louis Stevenson and Joseph Conrad, the debate of its historicity raged. María José Rodilla placed it on the same scale of Portrait of Lozana: The Lusty Andalusian Woman and Don Quixote in terms of providing a window of social testimony in a bygone era, even if in the end it turned to be fictional. Ramírez himself has been described as a "typical Latin American hero" as present in the literature that followed in the region, who happened to appear at a time where the New World was desperate for American heroes, regardless if true or fictional.

Leonor Taiano argues that the reason why Ramírez received the protection of Gaspar de la Cerda, despite the troubling aspects of his involvement with pirates that caused suspicion in other officials, was because it played into his favor by depicting him as a benevolent leader that acted to protect a "defenseless man". This act of "generosity and mercy" and the emphasis of on external and violent enemies, reflected positively on him and allowed Counter-Reformation propaganda to prosper in the New Spain. This author also questions whether Ramírez's criticism of Miguel was intentional, as an attempt to justify that he spoke favorably of some of the pirates that had been forced to adopt Protestantism and were in essence "Crypto-Catholics" and vulnerable before the British Crown. Taiano ultimately identifies Ramírez self-mythification, in particular the claims that he was an oppressed captive and by-stander, to push forward that he was only a victim of circumstance who stuck to his Catholic faith and was ultimately saved by his piety and the benevolent Spanish establishment.

=== A unique insight on the criollo perception of the world ===
It has also been cited as a novel approach to Imperial community, one based on inspiring pity over appealing to similarities. The account has been called a "unique Latin American perspective to subjects that have long been dominated by European narratives, namely living in times were piracy and shipwrecks were part of daily life for sailors." As a sailor, Ramírez was well accustomed to the frequency in which freebooters targeted Spanish ports and part of his critique of the poor military capacity and equipment of the Nuestra Señora de Aránzazu y San Ignacio was due to feeling fully exposed to attack. Later in the narrative he noted that he associated the British with piracy, a product of numerous attacks by privateers in the Spanish colonies including the attack of his hometown, challenging their maritime hegemony. Despite buccaneers becoming prevalent throughout the region in the decades leading to his birth, Ramírez expresses a more favorable perception of the French in his account, simply due to them being Catholic.

It has been noted that his religious affiliation plays an important role in the interactions between Ramírez and the foreigners that he encountered throughout his life and on his Hispanic cultural identity. A sense of moral superiority is prevalent in his narrative, during which he made use of the terms "heretics" and "impious" in reference to the Protestant Anglican rites and practices of the British crew. He also accused the predominantly-Calvinist Dutch administration of oppressing the practice of Catholicism at Malaca, while allowing other religions and "gentiles" to live unbothered. Likewise, Ramírez expresses considerable prejudice against Muslims, to whom he refers to as "barbaric [...] Moors", that was informed by longstanding Spanish Islamophobic tendencies that were incorporated into the folklore of Puerto Rico via demonic depictions known as Vejigantes and reenactments of the Spanish-Moro conflict and Reconquista in popular celebrations. These narratives hold so much power over his perception that he was willing to beg and humiliate himself before being left behind in Madagascar. He classified the Tartars, which possibly included other ethnic groups such as Mongolians, as "tricky". Ramírez displayed knowledge of numerous ethnic groups as well, including the Makassarese, Siamese, Bugis, Armenians and Danish, but mostly describes their social roles and doesn't express the same disdain towards them.

=== Geography and society of the Spanish East Indies and non-Hispanic Asia ===
Martínez and Alonso consider the narrative as a particularly important insight of the Spanish colonies in the Pacific, especially the Philippines, noting the general accuracy of its description of Manila Bay and several cays and islands along the Manila galleon route. Ramírez provided a seaman's perspective that is lacking in other contemporary accounts of the Philippines capital, which argued that regional merchants and importation from sources independent of the Trans-Pacific fleet were more important than support from the Empire. Regarding Ramírez's description of the several ports found at Southeast Asia, his description of the ethnic composition and socioeconomic realities of each town is both accurate and supported by other sources, including official censuses. The interactions noted between locals and foreign Imperial powers, such as between Tatars in China and the Portuguese at colony Macao, are consistent with historic consensus. Ramírez's description of the poor defenses and equipment afforded by the Spanish for the Philippines is supported by other authors and considered a veiled criticism towards the management of the colony within the Empire. His limited understanding of the Malay language led to several places being named as "Pulo" (the word for "island") in the narrative, as is the case with multiple Malaysian ports mentioned. The traffic and merchandise type of the Bangali trade route are also supported by other sources.

== Bibliography ==
=== Books ===
- Hennepin, Luis (1902). Colección de Libros Raros y Curiosos que Traían de America (Tome XX) (in Spanish). Madrid, Spain: Imprenta Vda. De Gabriel Pedraza. ISBN 31761014548093.
- José Buscaglia Salgado (2009). ""Prólogo" a Carlos de Sigüenza y Góngora". Historias del Seno Mexicano. La Habana: Fondo Editorial Casa de las Américas. ISBN 9789592602748.
- José Buscaglia Salgado (2022). "Alonso Ramírez's Circumnavigation of the World (1675–1689) and the Universal Claim to the American Spirit in the Open Seas". Hydrocriticism and Colonialism in Latin America. London: Palgrave Macmillan. ISBN 978-3031089022.
- Carlos de Sigüenza y Gongora, José Buscaglia Salgado (2018). Infortunios de Alonso Ramirez / The Misfortunes of Alonso Ramirez (1690): Annotated Bilingual Edition. New Jersey: Rutgers University Press. ISBN 978-0813593074.
- Carlos de Sigüenza y Gongora, José Buscaglia Salgado (1984). Infortunios de Alonso Ramírez. Edited by J. S. Cummins and Alan Soons. London: Tamesis Texts. ISBN 0729301710.
- Carlos de Sigüenza y Gongora, Estelle Irizarry (1990). Infortunios de Alonso Ramírez de Carlos de Sigüenza y Gongora: Edición de Estelle Irizarry. San Juan: Editorial Cultural. ASIN B000U53ZDO.
- Carlos de Sigüenza y Gongora, Antonio Lorente Medina (2017). Infortunios de Alonso Ramírez de Carlos de Sigüenza y Gongora: Estudio preliminar y edición de Antonio Lorente Medina. Madrid: Editorial Iberoamericana. ISBN 9788416922000.
- Meléndez, Concha (1958). Figuración de Puerto Rico y otros estudios (in Spanish). San Juan, Puerto Rico: Institute of Puerto Rican Culture. ASIN B0017XBKKS.
- Rivera de Álvarez, Josefina (1955). Diccionario de literatura Puertorriqueña (in Spanish). San Juan, Puerto Rico: University of Puerto Rico. ASIN B002GEEPO0.
- Vidargas, Francisco (1997). San Juan de Ulúa y Carlos de Sigüenza y Góngora (in Spanish). Xalapa: Instituto Veracruzano de la Cultura. ISBN 9687824034.

=== Academic articles and theses ===
- Bautista Duizeide, Juan (April 2009). "El viaje por mar en la literatura escrita en español. Aproximaciones y derivas". Hojas Universitarias: Revista de la Universidad Central. 1 (61). Central University of Colombia.
- Buscaglia Salgado, José Francisco (Fall–Winter 2011). "Infortunios de Alonso Ramírez (1690), o del naufragio que le abrió a América el mundo". Revista la Habana Elegante. 1 (50). Southern Methodist University.
- Díaz Báez, José Luis (January 1, 2020). "Los Infortunios de Alonso Ramírez o la picaresca sin pícaro". Revista de Estudios Hispánicos. 2 (7). University of Puerto Rico, Río Piedras Campus.
- Goldmark, Matthew (Spring 2020). "Moved by Pity: Communities of Affect in the Infortunios de Alonso Ramírez" (PDF). Revista Canadiense de Estudios Hispánicos. 44 (3). Asociación Canadiense de Hispanistas.
- Quinn, Paul (July 22–27, 1996). "Los libros del Tesoro: Un análisis comparativo de la obra de Carlos de Sigüenza y Góngora y Robert Louis Stevenson" (PDF). Acts of the IV Asociación Internacional Siglo de Oro (AISO) Congress. 1 (1). University of Alcalá.
- Lane, Kris (2012). "Review of: Fabio López Lázaro, The Misfortunes of Alonso Ramírez: The True Adventures of a Spanish American with 17th-Century Pirates" (PDF). Bulletin for Spanish and Portuguese Historical Studies. 37 (1). Tulane University.
- López Lázaro, Fabio (July 2007). "La mentira histórica de un pirata caribeño: El descubrimiento del trasfondo histórico de los Infortunios de Alonso Ramírez (1690)". Anuario de Estudios Americanos. 64 (2).
- Martínez Shaw, Carlos; Alfonso Mola, Marina (October 1, 2020). "Los infortunios de Alonso Ramírez y el pacífico de los ibéricos". Tiempo y Forma. Serie IV: Historia Moderna. 1 (33). Revistas Científicas UNED.
- Schidhuber, Guillermo (May 1995). "Sobre Carlos de Sigüenza y Góngora, Infortunios de Alonso Ramírez. Edición de Estelle Irizarry". Revista Iberoamericana. 172 (61). Instituto Internacional de Literatura Iberoamericana.
- Peña Izquierdo, Antonio Ramón (2005). La crisis sucesoria de la monarquía española (PDF) (PhD thesis). Barcelona: Universidad Autónoma de Barcelona.
- Taiano Campoverde, Leonor (January 2023). "Piracy, Captivity and Redemption in Infortunios de Alonso Ramírez". Revista Sociopoética. 1 (25). Paraíba State University.
- Taiano Campoverde, Leonor (2013). Entre mecenazgo y piratería. Una re-contextualización histórica e ideológica de Infortunios de Alonso Ramírez (PhD thesis). Norway: The Arctic University of Norway.
- Torres Nazario, Sheila Yalizmar (January 1, 2020). "The captatio benevolentiae and the Picaresque features in the Infortunios de Alonso Ramírez". Revista de Estudios Hispánicos. 2 (7). University of Puerto Rico, Río Piedras Campus.
