= Villafranca de Duero =

Coordinates: 41°26′N 5°18′W

Villafranca de Duero, Spain
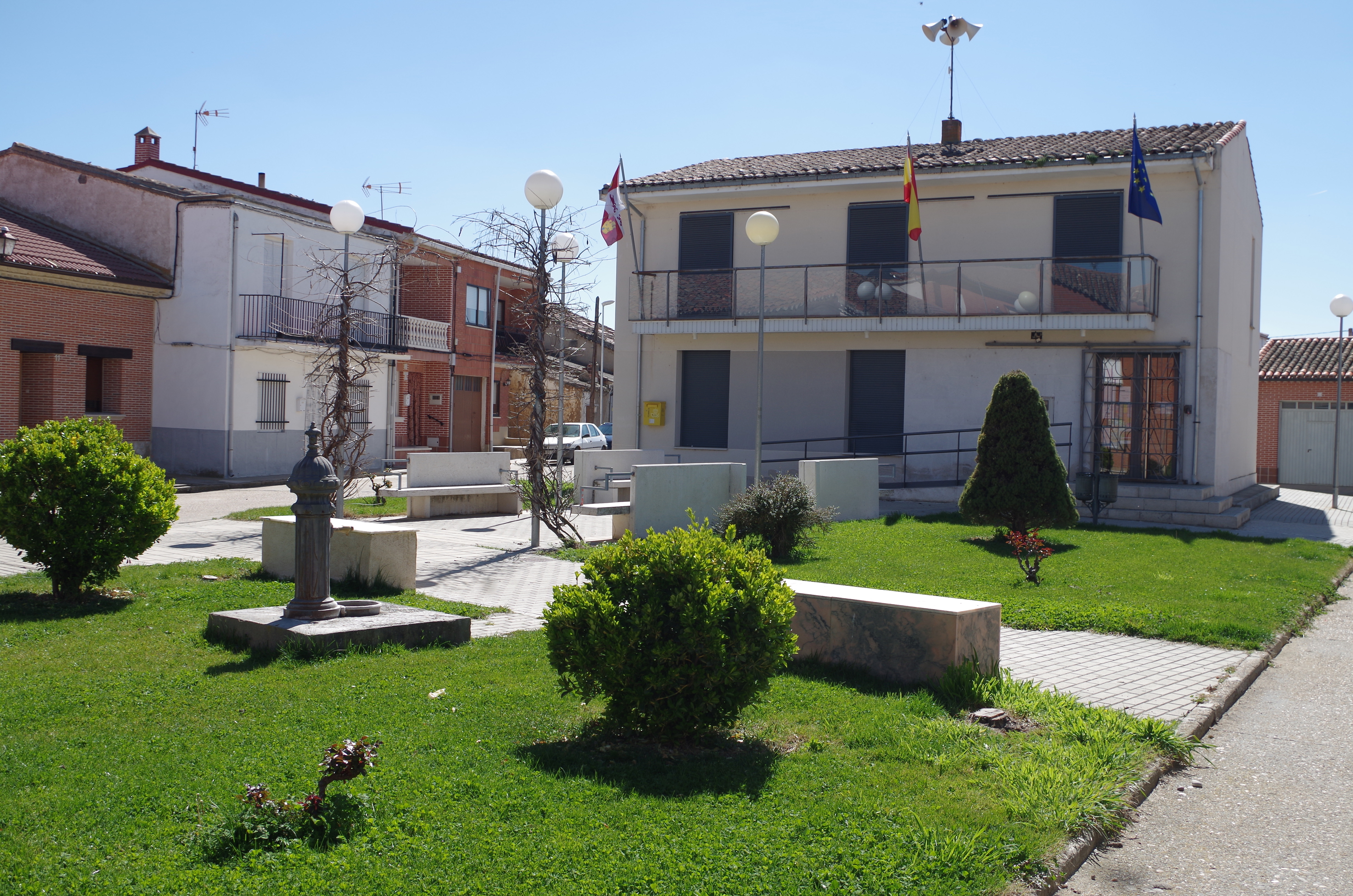
- Town Hall of Villafranca de Duero
- Interactive map of Villafranca de Duero, Spain
- Country: Spain
- Autonomous community: Castile and León
- Province: Valladolid
- Municipality: Villafranca de Duero

Area
  - Total: 10 km^{2} (3.9 sq mi)

Population (2025-01-01)
  - Total: 247
  - Density: 25/km^{2} (64/sq mi)
- Time zone: UTC+1 (CET)
  - Summer (DST): UTC+2 (CEST)

Villafranca de Duero is a municipality located in the province of Valladolid, Castile and León, Spain. According to the 2004 census (INE), the municipality has a population of 374 inhabitants.
