= Vâlcele =

Vâlcele may refer to several places in Romania:

- Vâlcele, Covasna, a commune in Covasna County
- Vâlcele, Olt, a commune in Olt County
- Vâlcele, a village in Merișani Commune, Argeș County
- Vâlcele, a village in Corbasca Commune, Bacău County
- Vâlcele, a village in Suplacu de Barcău Commune, Bihor County
- Vâlcele, a village in Brăești, Botoșani
- Vâlcele, a village in Ulmeni, Buzău
- Vâlcele, a village in Bobâlna, Cluj
- Vâlcele, a village in Feleacu Commune, Cluj County
- Vâlcele, a village in Bretea Română Commune, Hunedoara County
- Vâlcele, a village in Stroieşti Commune, Suceava County
- Vâlcele, a village in Oșești Commune, Vaslui County
- Vâlcele, a village in Câmpineanca Commune, Vrancea County
- Vâlcele, a district in the town of Târgu Ocna, Bacău County
- Vâlcele, a district in the town of Negru Vodă, Constanţa County
- Vâlcele, a district in the town of Tismana, Gorj County
- rivers in Romania:
  - Vâlcele (Olt), a tributary of the Olt in Covasna County
  - Vâlcele, a tributary of the Trotuș in Bacău County
