= Carlos de Sigüenza y Góngora =

Mexican academic (1645–1700)

Don Carlos de Sigüenza y Góngora
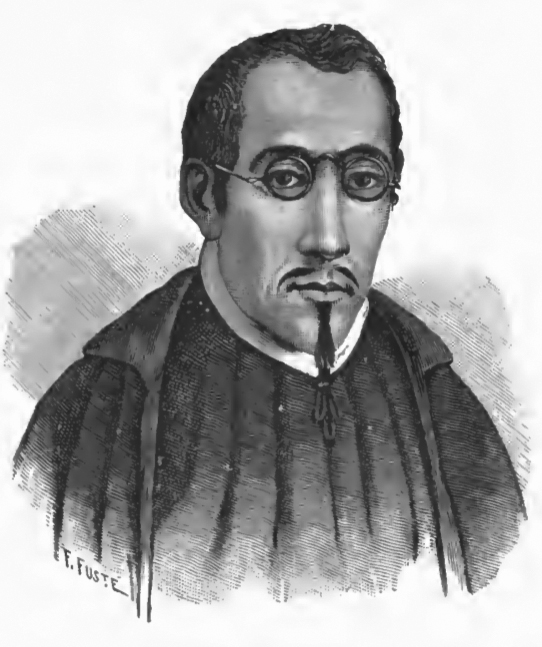
- Born: Don Carlos de Sigüenza y Góngora; August 14, 1645; Mexico City, New Spain
- Died: August 22, 1700 (aged 55); Mexico City, New Spain
- Occupations: priest, poet, non-fiction writer, mathematician, historian, philosopher, cartographer, explorer, and cosmographer

Carlos de Sigüenza y Góngora (August 14, 1645 – August 22, 1700), considered one of the first great intellectuals born in the Americas, was the Spanish viceroy of New Spain (Mexico City). He was a criollo patriot, exalting New Spain over Old. A polymath and writer, he held many colonial government and academic positions. Sigüenza is considered the da Vinci mexicano ("Mexican da Vinci") and among the most important intellectuals from Colonial Spanish America, alongside Juan de Espinosa Medrano.

== Early life ==
Sigüenza was born in Mexico City in 1645 to Don Carlos de Sigüenza y Benito, originally from Madrid, and to Doña Dionisia Suárez de Figueroa y Góngora, who was born in Seville, Spain. His father and mother met in New Spain in 1640. Sigüenza was the second oldest and first male of the couple's nine children. He was related to the famous baroque Spanish poet Luis de Góngora through his mother. He studied mathematics and astronomy under the direction of his father, who had been a tutor for the royal family in Spain.

== Expulsion from the Jesuits ==
Sigüenza entered the Society of Jesus as a novice on August 17, 1660 and took his simple vows on August 15, 1662 in Tepotzotlán. He was dismissed from the Jesuits in 1668 for repeatedly flouting Jesuit discipline and going out secretly at night. He repented and pleaded to be reinstated, but the head of the Jesuits, the General of the Order, rejected his plea, saying, "The cause of the expulsion of this person is so disreputable, as he himself confesses, that he does not deserve this boon [of being readmitted]." This dismissal was not only a grave disappointment and a blot on his reputation, but it also meant that he would be financially insecure for the rest of this life. He became a secular priest without a parish or a steady income. He sought many offices throughout his life in order to support himself and his extended family, all of whom, his father included, were dependent on him to the end of his life. He was ordained a secular priest in 1673.

== Career in Science ==
He studied at the Real y Pontificia Universidad de México (Royal and Pontifical University of Mexico) following his dismissal from the Jesuits, where he excelled at mathematics and developed a lifelong interest in the sciences. When a faculty position in Mathematics & Astrology (when he held it he taught mainly astronomy) was available, Sigüenza sought to compete for it, although he did not hold a doctoral degree in the subjects. It was not clear that he could even be eligible to compete, but Sigüenza argued successfully to do so. Selection for university posts was via oposiciones or competition between candidates. A question was posed and the candidate had to complete a response within 24 hours to be judged by a panel. Ghost writers or ringers sometimes completed the exercise and Sigüenza successfully argued that his chief rival for the position, and the person who vociferously argued that Sigüenza had no standing to even compete, had to be kept under surveillance during the competition to prevent cheating. On July 20, 1672, he was named to the chair of Mathematics and Astrology. His record as a professor was marred because he was frequently absent from the classroom due to his researches on various topics and to the pressing of other obligations he took on for fiscal reasons. One of his biographers suggests that his absences from the university might be attributable to his disdain for astrology, which he considered "a diabolical invention and consequently, alien to science, method, principle and truth."

In 1681 Sigüenza wrote the book Philosophical Manifest Against the Comets Stripped of their Dominion over the Timid in which he tried to dismiss fears of impending superstitious predictions that linked comets to calamitous events; in the work he takes steps to separate the fields of astrology and astronomy. The Tyrolean Jesuit Eusebio Kino, who had come to New Spain to evangelize on the northern frontier, met Sigüenza at his home in Mexico City. Both men had observed the comet of 1680 and both were keenly interested in the phenomenon. The warm feelings between the two soured quickly, with Sigüenza believing that Kino belittled Mexican-born Spaniards' (creoles) level of learning. Kino published a strong criticism of Sigüenza's opinion on comets, without naming him specifically. Kino's criticism was that because they were contradictory to established astronomical/astrological belief in the heavens. Sigüenza often cited authors such as Copernicus, Galileo, Descartes, Kepler, and Tycho Brahe. In 1690, Sigüenza moved to defend his previous work by publishing "Libra Astronómica y Filosófica"; it was unlike many of his other writings, which remained in manuscript form because he could not afford to publish them. He directly attacks Kino by saying "I hereby point out that neither his Reverence [Kino] nor any other mathematician, even if he is Ptolemy himself, can set up dogmas in these sciences, because authority has no place in them at all, but only proof and demonstration." Theology was known as the "Queen of the Sciences", but Sigüenza's stance is on the side of science as defined in the modern era.

== Royal geographer ==
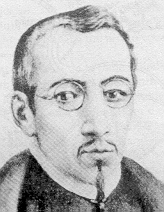
Carlos de Sigüenza y Góngora

In the 1680s, he prepared the first-ever map of all of New Spain, which won high praise and was widely copied. He also drew hydrologic maps of the Valley of Mexico. In 1692 King Charles II named him official geographer for the colony. As royal geographer, he participated in the 1692 expedition to Pensacola Bay, Florida under command of Andrés de Pez, to seek out defensible frontiers against French encroachment. He mapped Pensacola Bay and the mouth of the Mississippi: in 1693, he described the terrain in Descripción del seno de Santa María de Galve, alias Panzacola, de la Mobila y del Río Misisipi.

When a Spanish attempt to colonize Pensacola Bay in 1698 was thwarted by the arrival of a French fleet, Sigüenza was blamed by the leader of the expedition, Andrés de Arriola, for inciting the French action. He successfully defended himself against these charges in 1699.

== Other professional pursuits ==
In order to supplement his modest salary as a professor, he took on a number of other posts. He was chaplain of the Hospital del Amor de Dios (now Academia de San Carlos) from 1682 until his death. This post provided him with living quarters, which given his strapped financial circumstances was a major benefit. It also was a steady income from celebrating masses for a fixed fee. He also served as Chief Almoner for the Archbishop of Mexico, Don Francisco de Aguiar y Seijas, distributing alms to poor women, a charity the "misogynistic prelate could not abide."

Sigüenza not only pursued his interests in science, but he was also a poet, non-fiction writer, historian, philosopher, cartographer, and cosmographer of the realm. Such was his prestige that the French King Louis XIV tried to induce him to come to Paris. He published his first poem in 1662. From 1671 to 1701 (posthumous) he published a yearly almanac. A. Margarita Peraza-Rugeley has studied the surviving almanacs in her 2013 book.

In 1690 Sigüenza published a pirate captivity narrative which has been considered Latin America's first novel, Los infortunios de Alonso Ramírez (The Misfortunes of Alonso Ramírez). However, new archival evidence discovered by Fabio López Lázaro (2007, 2011), José F. Buscaglia (2009, 2011), and A. Margarita Peraza-Rugeley (2013) proves that this incredible story of a Puerto Rican taken captive by English pirates off the Philippine Islands is a historical account, not a fictional one. The archival documents contain dozens of eyewitness accounts corroborating not only the existence of Ramírez, his marriage in Mexico City, and also his capture in 1687, his life with pirates (most notably William Dampier), his collaboration with them, and his return to Mexico in 1690, at which time Spanish colonial authorities suspected Alonso of piracy. López Lázaro was the first to discover archival evidence (published in 2007) for the historical existence of Ramírez, his meeting with the Viceroy of New Spain, and the writing of Los infortunios in 1690. Buscaglia corroborated the existence of Alonso Ramírez as a true historical figure in 2009, citing his marriage certificate and pinpointing with exactitude, after two expeditions to the coast of Bacalar, the site of his shipwreck. López Lázaro's and Buscaglia's studies are the most significant findings in more than a century of scholarship on the book. The new archival evidence leaves no room to doubt that Sigüenza's key role in creating Los infortunios de Alonso Ramírez was in editing Alonso's coarse narrative into a superior literary piece. According to López Lázaro's analysis, the book was commissioned by the Spanish administration during the war against Louis XIV to solidify Madrid's commitment to the struggle against French colonial rivals and their buccaneer collaborators but also to warn them about Spain's unreliable English and Dutch allies. In his critical bilingual edition of the Infortunios/Misfortunes, Buscaglia argues that the work opens a door into the intricacies of early American subjectivity. In the same edition, Buscaglia furnishes concrete proof of having found the shipwreck of Ramirez's frigate in Punta Herradura, on the coast of Yucatán, Mexico.

== Friendship with Sor Juana Inés de la Cruz ==
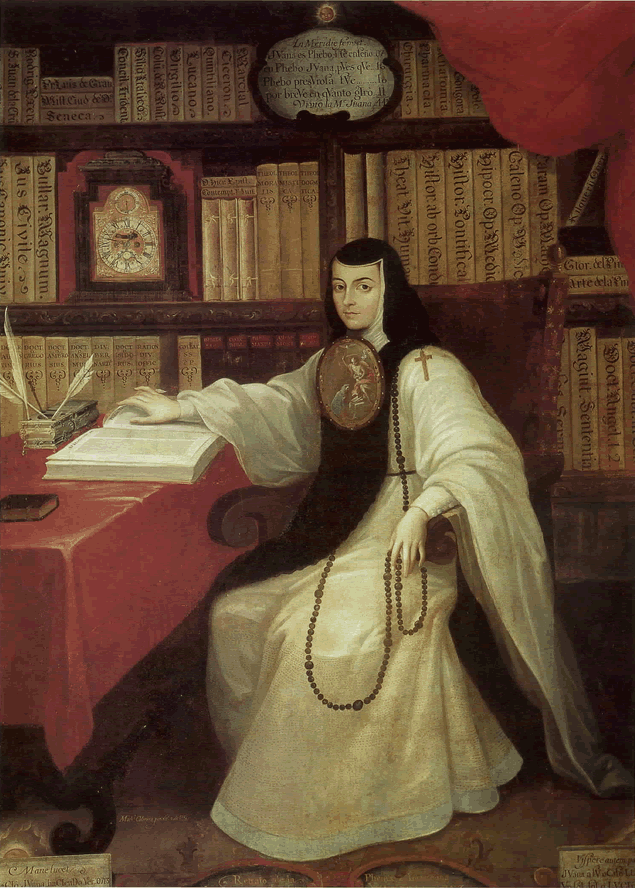
Sor Juana Inés de la Cruz, posthumous painting by Miguel Cabrera.

Seventeenth-century Mexico City had two savants, Don Carlos de Sigüenza y Góngora and Doña Juana Inés de Asbaje y Ramírez de Santillana, known to posterity as the Hieronymite nun, Sor Juana Inés de la Cruz. It is unclear at what point the two made their acquaintance, but they lived a short distance away from each other, he in the Amor de Dios Hospital and she in the convent where she had taken vows following a time spent in the viceregal court. Although Sor Juana was cloistered, the Hieronymite order followed a more relaxed rule and nuns could have visitors in the locutorio or special room for conversation in the convent. Known as the "Tenth Muse", she was a formidable intellect and poet, and was encouraged in her scientific studies by Sigüenza. Each was well known in circles of power and with the arrival of the new viceroy to New Spain, each was tapped to design a triumphal arch to welcome him, a signal honor to them both. Sor Juana's final years were extremely difficult ones, and when she died in 1695, Sigüenza delivered the eulogy at her funeral. The text of that address is now lost, but in 1680 he had praised her, "There is no pen that can rise to the eminence that hers o'ertops...[the fame of] Sor Juana Inés de la Cruz will only end with the world."

== The Ixtlilxochitl-Sigüenza-Boturini collection ==
Sigüenza had a strong interest in the indigenous past of Mexico and began learning Nahuatl following his dismissal from the Jesuits in 1668. He collected books and other materials related to indigenous culture. At the Hospital de Amor de Dios Sigüenza became a close friend of Don Juan, the son of indigenous nobleman Don Fernando de Alva Ixtlilxochitl, (1587?-1650). Sigüenza helped Alva Ixtlilxochitl's or Don Juan de Alva with a lawsuit against Spaniards attempting to usurp his holdings near the great pyramids at San Juan Teotihuacan. Don Juan in gratitude for Sigüenza's aid, gifted him the manuscripts and codices of his historian father, Don Fernando Alva Ixtlilxochitl. This was a rich collection of documents of his royal ancestors and the kings of Texcoco. In 1668, Sigüenza began the study of Aztec history and Toltec writing. On the death of Alva Ixtlilxochitl in 1650, he inherited the collection of documents, and devoted the later years of his life to the continuous study of Mexican history. When Sigüenza made his will shortly before his death, he was very concerned about the fate of his library, since its "collection has cost me great pains and care, and a considerable sum of money." His original intention was to have his library transferred to European repositories, including the Vatican and the Escorial, and to library of the duke of Florence, but in the end he willed them to the College of San Pedro and San Pablo. He was particularly concerned about the native materials in his collection. For an account of what happened to these documents after the death of Sigüenza, see Lorenzo Boturini Bernaducci.

== The Virgin of Guadalupe ==
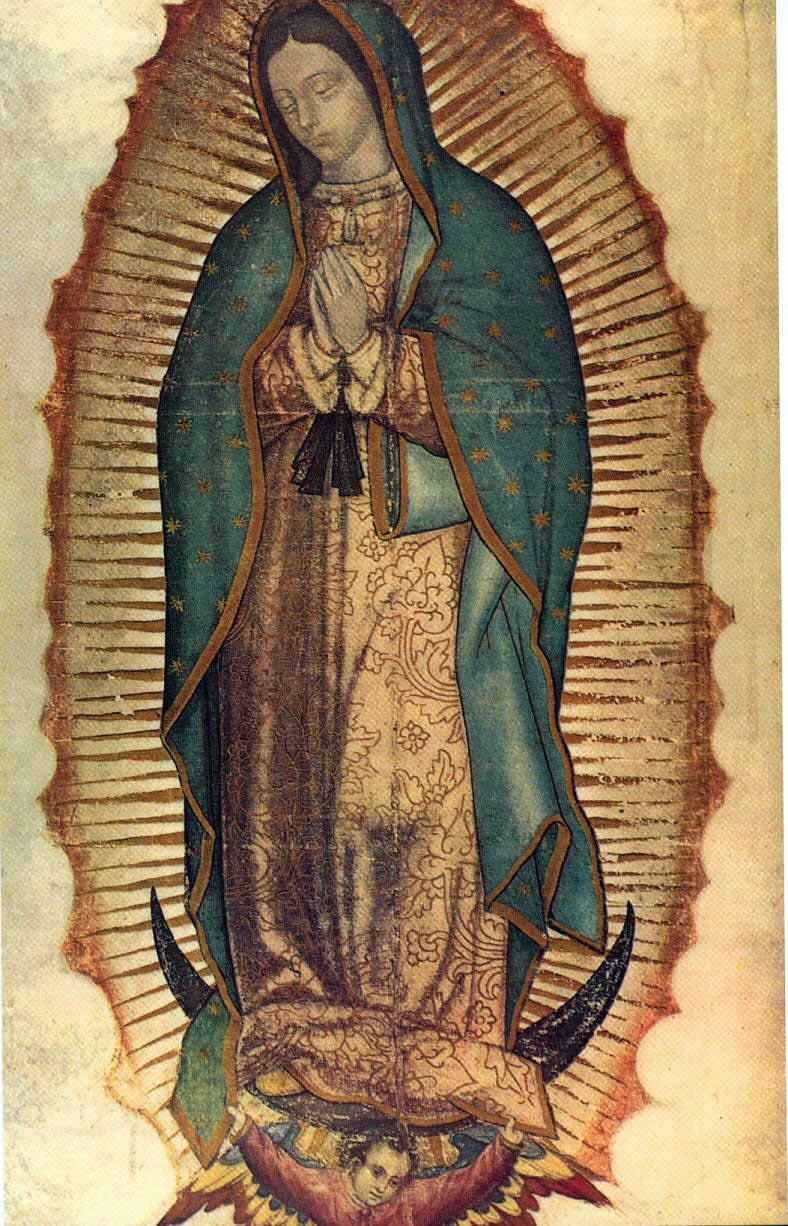
Virgin of Guadalupe

Sigüenza wrote Indian Spring whose full title in Spanish is Primavera indiana, poema sacrohistórico, idea de María Santíssima de Guadalupe (1662). The work contributed to the midseventeenth-century outpouring of writings on the Virgin of Guadalupe. Sigüenza wrote in praise of Guadalupe, especially her role in aiding creole patriotism. Among these documents was purported to be a "map" (codex) documenting the 1531 apparition of the Virgin Mary as Our Lady of Guadalupe that Luis Becerra Tanco claimed to have seen in the introduction to his 1666 defense of the apparition tradition. Sigüenza writings on Guadalupe were not extensive, but he encouraged Becerra Tanco and Francisco de Florencia to pursue the topic.

Because of his association with these early documents, Sigüenza played a significant role in the development of the Guadalupe story. He was a devotee of the Virgin, and wrote Parnassian poems to her as early as 1662. But his most lasting impact on the history of the apparition was his assertion that the Nican mopohua, the Nahuatl-language rendition of the narrative, was written by Antonio Valeriano, a conception that persists to this day. He further identified Fernando Alva de Ixtlilxochitl as the author of the Nican motecpana. This declaration was stimulated by Francisco de Florencia's Polestar of Mexico, which claimed that the original Nahuatl account had been written by Franciscan Fray Jerónimo de Mendieta.

== Creole patriotism and the triumphal arch to welcome the viceroy in 1680 ==
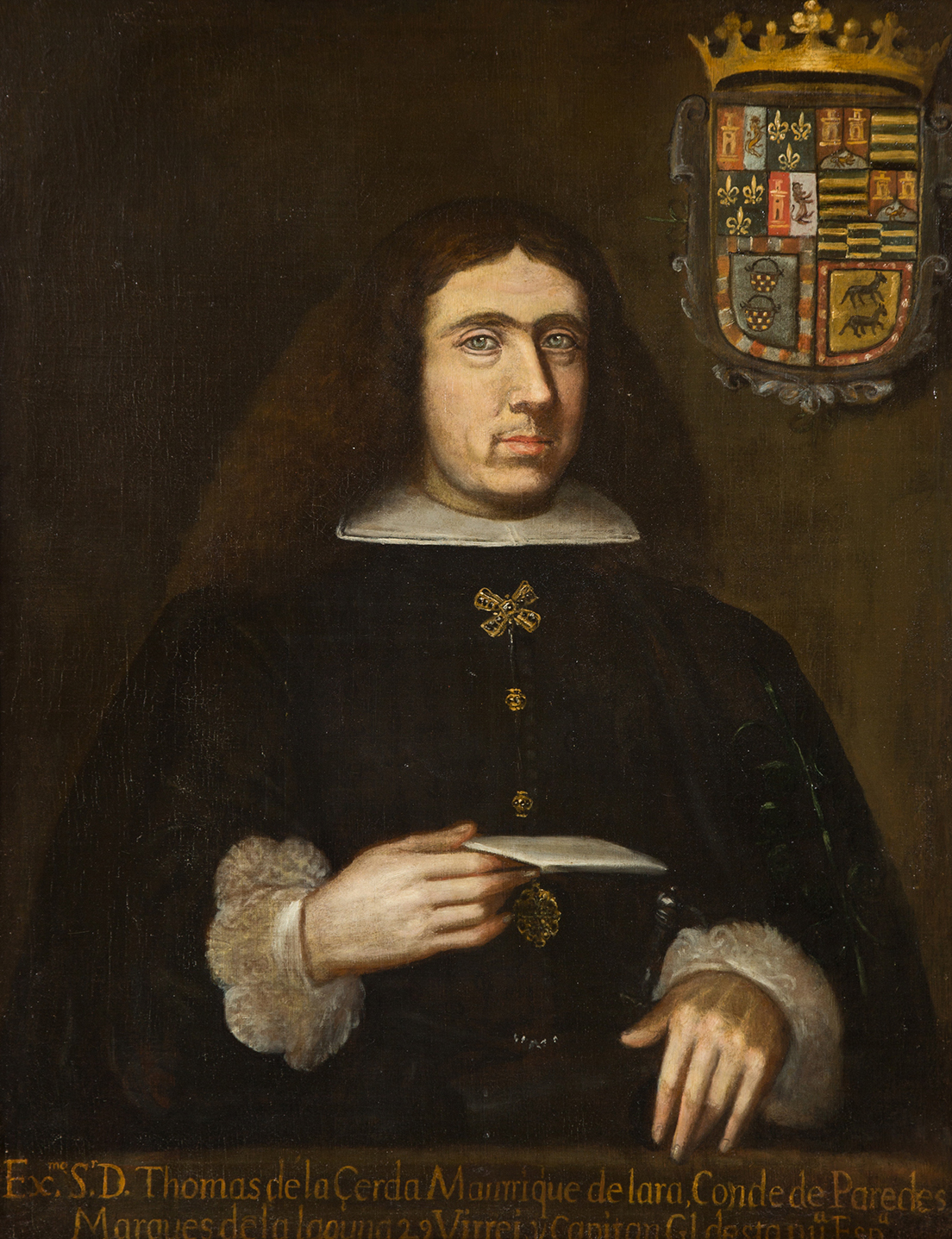
Viceroy Tomás de la Cerda

In 1680, he was commissioned to design a triumphal arch for the arrival of the new Viceroy, Cerda y Aragón. Sor Juana Inés de la Cruz was commissioned to design the only other one, which were erected in the Plaza de Santo Domingo, near the main square or Zócalo. No image of the triumphal arches is known to be extant, but both Sigüenza and Sor Juana wrote descriptions of the works. Sigüenza's work was entitled Theater of Political Virtues That Constitute a Ruler, Observed in the Ancient Monarchs of the Mexican Empire, Whose Effigies Adorn the Arch Erected by the Very Noble Imperial City of Mexico. Sigüenza's title was meant to convey to the new viceroy that his tenure in office was in a long line of Mexican monarchs. On the arch were images of all twelve Aztec rulers, "each taken to embody different political virtues. Also represented was the god Huitzilopochtli, whom Sigüenza claimed was not a deity but a "chieftain and leader of Mexicans in the voyage that by his command was undertaken in search of the provinces of Anahuac." Sigüenza's gigantic wooden arch (90 feet high, fifty feet wide) was a manifestation of creole patriotism that embraced the florescence of the Aztecs as a source of their own pride in their patria. He hoped that "on some occasion the Mexican monarchs might be reborn from the ashes to which oblivion had consigned them, so that, like Western phoenixes, they may be immortalized by fame" and be recognized as having "heroic ... imperial virtues." Sigüenza praised the arch that Sor Juana had designed, but hers took the theme of Neptune in fable and did not manifest any explicit theme "contribut[ing] to the growth of creole patriotism."

== Ideas about the ancient Mexicans ==
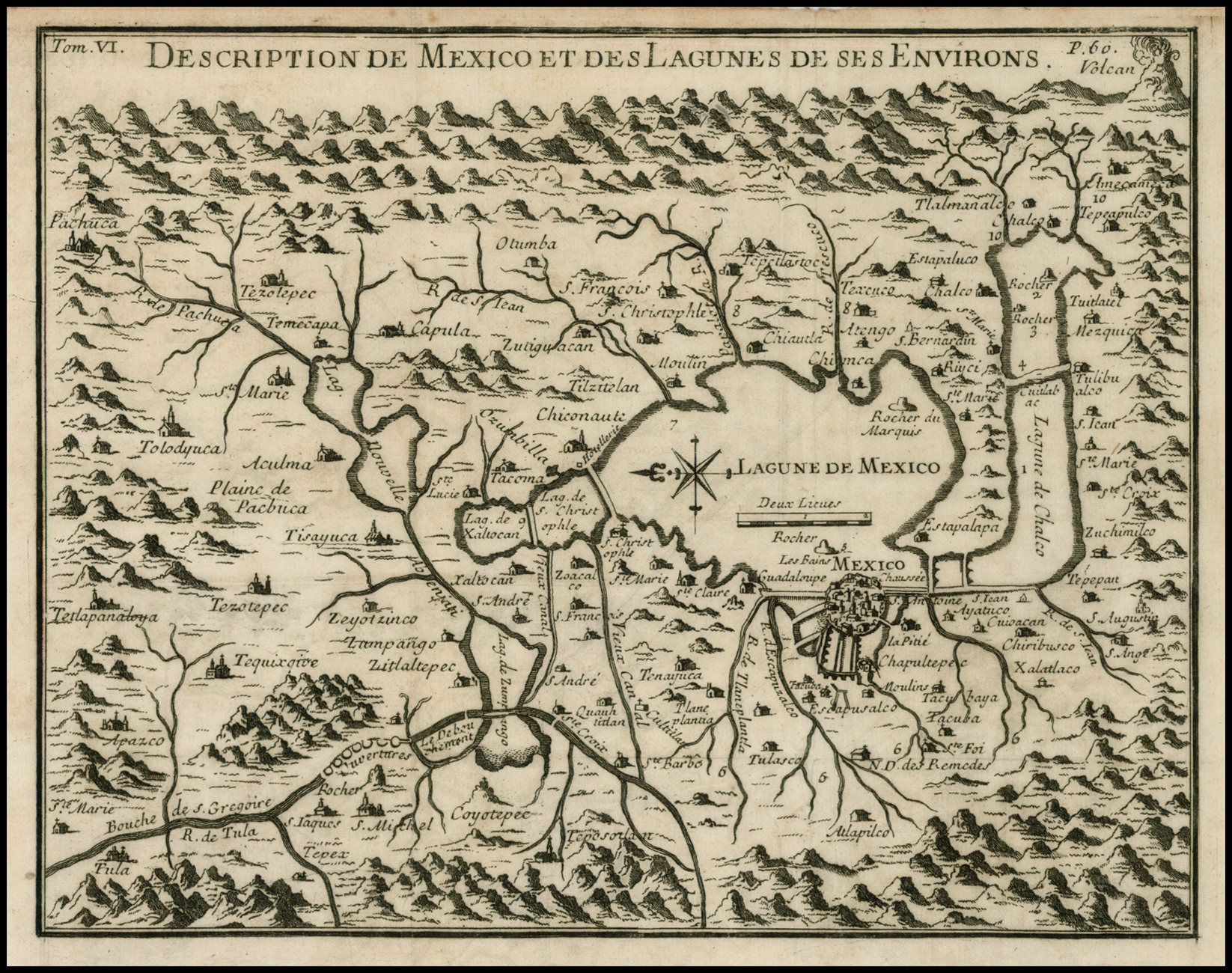
Map of Mexico and the central lake system by Italian traveler Giovanni Francesco Gemelli Careri from one by Sigüenza y Góngora.

Sigüenza's ideas about the ancient Mexicans were informed by the hugely valuable manuscripts from Alva Ixtlilxochitl, but he also developed ideas of his own about the origin of the Mexicans. He was one of the first persons, during Spanish rule, to dig around the Pyramid of the Sun at Teotihuacan. He took Italian traveler Giovanni Francesco Gemelli Careri to that ancient site. Sigüenza's ideas about the origins of the ancient Mexicans were influenced by German Jesuit Athanasius Kircher, who saw ancient Egypt as the source of all natural wisdom. Sigüenza embraced Kircher's ideas and in the publication accompanying his triumphal arch for the arrival of the new viceroy, Theater of Political Virtues That Constitute a Ruler, "he boldly pronounced that the Mexican Indians were the descendants of the Naphtuhim, the son of Misraim, founder and ruler of Egypt," and further asserted that Naphtuhim was a variation on the name Neptune, the ruler of Atlantis, populated by Egyptian colonists. In advocating an Egyptian origin for the ancient Mexicans, he rejects Franciscan fray Juan de Torquemada's dismissal of that theory. Sigüenza, also as opposed to Torquemada, believed that St Thomas the Apostle evangelized Mexico and identified him with Quetzalcoatl. He gave notice that a pamphlet entitled Phoenix of the West. St Thomas found with the name of Quetzalcoatl would be published, but whether he wrote it or not is unclear, since many of Sigüenza's works remain in title only.

== 1692 Mexico City riot ==
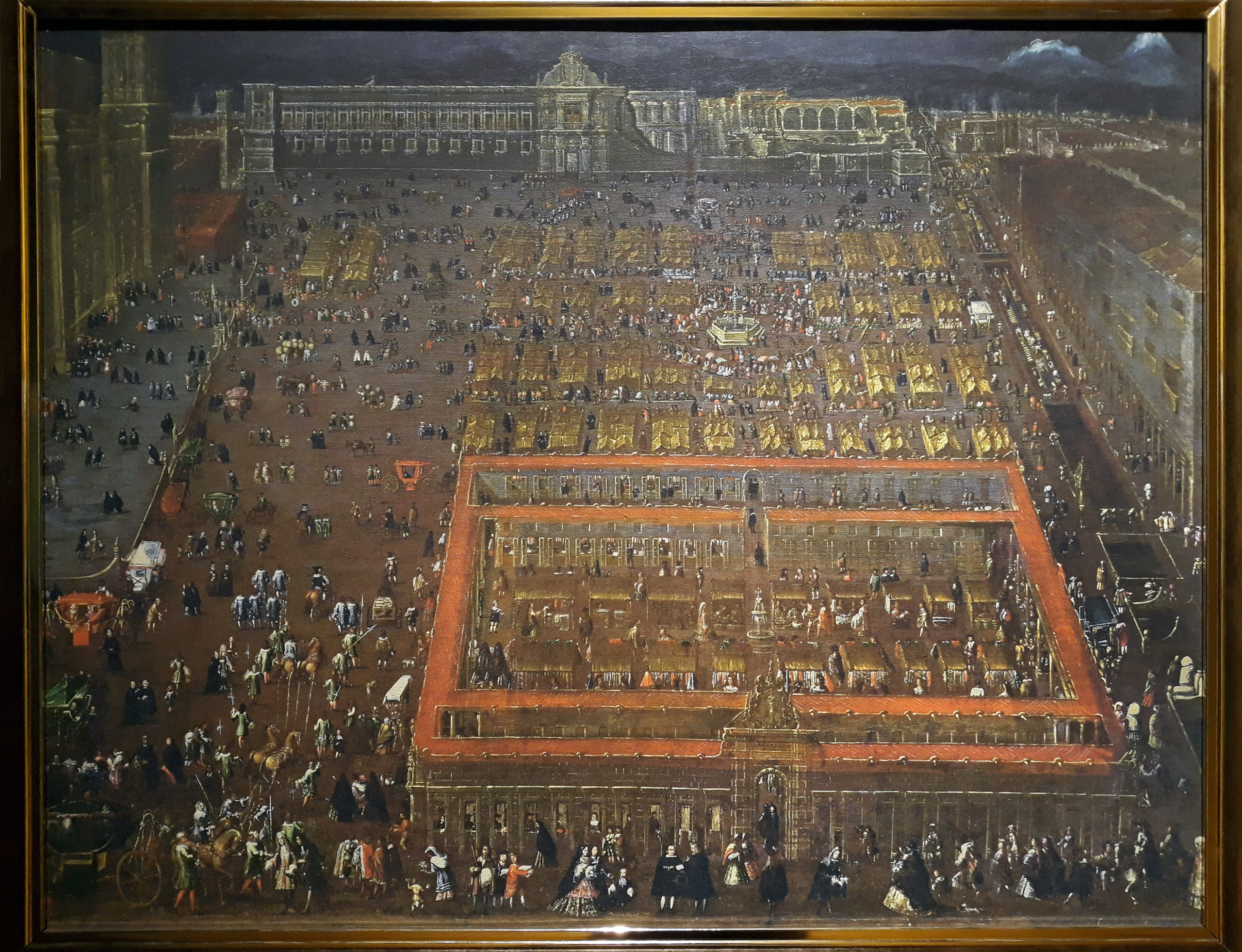
View of the Plaza Mayor of Mexico City (1695) by Cristóbal de Villalpando. The viceroy's palace still shows the damage done during the 1692 riot.

Considering the small proportion of the Spanish population in Mexico as opposed to the Indian and mixed-race casta populations and that the fact that there had been few challenges to Spanish rule since the early sixteenth-century conquest, likely meant the huge riot on June 8, 1692, was a shock to Spaniards. A mob of Indians and castas partially destroyed the viceregal palace and the building of the city council (cabildo or ayuntamiento). Painter Cristóbal de Villalpando's 1696 painting of the Zócalo still shows the damage to the viceregal palace from the mob's attempt to burn it down. Sigüenza wrote a lengthy "racy, vivid account of the riot...he also offered a fascinating profile of his own reactions to the dramatic events." It is a major source for the Spanish version of events, published as "Letter of Don Carlos de Sigüenza y Góngora to Admiral Pez Recounting the incidents of the Corn Riot in Mexico City, June 8, 1692." In 1692, there was a severe drought in New Spain and a disease attacking wheat, called in Nahuatl "chiahuiztli". The crown sought sources of corn outside the general sourcing area for the capital, but the price of corn rose significantly. This caused a severe shortage of food for the poor. Tensions rose significantly in the capital, and came to a flashpoint when neither the viceroy nor the archbishop, to whom the crowd of petitioners appealed as legitimate authorities, would meet directly with them. Following the failed attempt to get any official audience or promise of aid, the crowd began throwing stones and set fire to the major buildings around the capital's principal square. Sigüenza saved most of the documents and some paintings in the archives, at the risk of his own life. This act preserved a considerable number of colonial Mexican documents that would otherwise have been lost. Scholars have noted the importance of the 1692 riot in Mexican history.

== Later career and death ==
In 1693, he (along with Admiral Andrés de Pez y Malzarraga), set sail from Veracruz and discovered the East Bay River of Florida and the land where the city of Navarre is now located.

In 1694, he retired from the university. His final years were marked by even more financial and personal troubles. He became ill, with what physicians identified as either gallstones or kidney stones and he was in considerable pain. His patron the Archbishop Aguiar y Seijas died and Sigüenza lost his lucrative post of Chief Almoner. He also lost the position of University Accountant. The death of his patron the Archbishop was clustered with the death of Sigüenza's father and favorite brother. His dear friend Sor Juana Inés de la Cruz died and he delivered the eulogy at her funeral. In November 1699, Sigüenza was named corregidor general (book examiner) for the Inquisition, a position that paid little and which took up considerable time vetting books for possible heresy.

As his health deteriorated in these circumstances, Sigüenza prepared for the eventuality of his death, which came in 1700. A scientist to the end, he requested that his body be autopsied, so that physicians could determine what had afflicted him. He explicitly laid out the reasons and concerned that this radical step might be opposed on religious or other grounds by his relatives, he said "I ask in God's name that this [autopsy] be done for the common good, and I command my heir not to interfere, for it matters little that this be done to a body which, within a few days, must be corruption and decay." The autopsy revealed a kidney stone the size of a peach.

Sigüenza left his library and scientific instruments to the Jesuit Colegio Máximo de San Pedro y San Pablo in Mexico City. He was buried at the chapel of this Colegio, which could point to his having been reconciled with the Order. He also left a number of unpublished manuscripts, only fragments of which survived the expulsion of the Society of Jesus from the viceroyalty in 1767.

== Works ==
- Oriental planeta evangélica, epopeya sacropanegyrica al apostol grande de las Indias S. Francisco Xavier (1662).
- Primavera indiana, poema sacrohistórico, idea de María Santíssima de Guadalupe (1662).
- Glorias de Querétaro (1680) (poem)
- Teatro de virtudes políticas que constituyen a un Príncipe (1680). [Theater of Political Virtues That Constitute a Ruler, Observed in the Ancient Monarchs of the Mexican Empire, Whose Effigies Adorn the Arch Erected by the Very Noble Imperial City of Mexico]
- Glorias de Querétaro en la Nueva Congregación Eclesiástica de María Santíssima de Guadalupe... y el sumptuoso templo (1680).
- Libra Astronomica, y Philosophica en que D. Carlos de Siguenza y Gongora Coʃmographo, y Mathematico Regio en la Academia Mexicana, Examina no ʃolo lo que à ʃu Manifiesto Philosophico contra los Cometas opuʃo el R.P. Eusebio Francisco Kino de la Compañia de Jesus; ʃino lo que el miʃmo R.P. opinò, y pretendio haver demoʃtrado en ʃu Exposicion Astronomica del Cometa del año de 1681 (1690).
- Manifiesto philosophico contra los cometas despojados del imperio que tenían sobre los tímidos (1681).
- Triunfo parthénico que en glorias de María Santíssima... celebró la... Academia Mexicana (1683).
- Parayso Occidental, plantado y cultivado en su magnífico Real Convento de Jesüs María de México (1684).
- Piedad heróica de Don Hernando Cortés, Marqués del Valle (1689).
- The Misfortunes of Alonso Ramírez (1690).
- Relación de lo sucedido a la armada de Barlovento en la isla de Santo Domingo con la quelna del Guarico (1691).
- Trofeo de la justicia española en el castigo de la alevosía francesa (1691).
- Letter of Don Carlos de Sigüenza y Góngora to Admiral Pez Recounting the incidents of the Corn Riot in Mexico City, June 8, 1692 (1692)
- Descripción del seno de Santa María de Galve, alias Panzacola, de la Mobila y del Río Mississippi (1693).
- Mercurio volante con la noticia de la recuperacion de las provincias de Nuevo Mexico (1693)
- Elogio fúnebre de Sor Juana Inés de la Cruz (1695).

== See also ==
- List of Roman Catholic scientist-clerics

== Bibliography ==
- Brading, D. A. (1991). The First America: The Spanish Monarchy, Creole Patriots, and the Liberal State, 1492–1867. New York: Cambridge University Press. ISBN 978-0-5214-4796-6.
- Chang-Rodriguez, Raquel (1989). "Carlos de Sigüenza y Góngora". In Solé, Carlos A. (ed.). Latin American Writers. Macmillan Publishing House. pp. 71–77. ISBN 0684185970.
- Leonard, Irving A. (1929). Don Carlos Sigüenza y Góngora, a Mexican Savant of the Seventeenth Century. Berkeley, CA: University of California Press.
- Leonard, Irving A. (1959). "Baroque Times in Old Mexico". A Baroque Scholar. Ann Arbor, MI: University of Michigan Press.
- López Lázaro, Fabio (2011). The Misfortunes of Alonso Ramirez: The True Adventures of a Spanish American with 17th Century Pirates. Austin, TX: University of Texas Press. ISBN 978-0-292-74389-2.
- More, Anna (2013). Baroque Sovereignty: Carlos de Sigüenza y Góngora and the Creole Archive of Colonial Mexico. Philadelphia, PA: University of Pennsylvania Press.
- Paz, Octavio (1988). Sor Juana Inés de la Cruz. Cambridge, MA: Belnap Press of Harvard University.
- Poole, Stafford (1997). Our Lady of Guadalupe: The Origins and Sources of a Mexican National Symbol, 1531–1797. Tucson, AZ: University of Arizona Press. ISBN 978-0-8165-1623-0.

=== In Spanish ===
- (in Spanish) 12,000 Minibiografías. Panama City: Editorial América, 1991.
- (in Spanish) García Puron, Manuel, Mexico y sus gobernantes, v. 1. Mexico City: Joaquín Porrúa, 1984.
- López Lázaro, Fabio (2007). "La mentira histórica de un pirata caribeño: el descubrimiento del trasfondo histórico de los Infortunios de Alonso Ramírez (1690)". Anuario de Estudios Americanos. 64 (2): 90–104. doi:10.3989/aeamer.2007.v64.i2.82.
- Carlos de Sigüenza y Góngora, Historias del Seno Mexicano, José Francisco Buscaglia Salgado, ed., intro. Havana: Casa de las Américas, 2009.
- Carlos de Sigüenza y Góngora, Infortunios de Alonso Ramírez: Edición crítica de José F. Buscaglia, José F. Buscaglia Salgado, ed., intro., Madrid: Polifemo/Consejo Superior de Investigaciones Científicas, 2011.
- (in Spanish) Orozco Linares, Fernando, Gobernantes de México. Mexico City: Panorama Editorial, 1985, ISBN 968-38-0260-5.
- Peraza-Rugeley, A. Margarita, Llámenme el mexicano: los almanaques y otras obras de Carlos de Sigüenza y Góngora. New York: Peter Lang Publishing, 2013. Currents in Comparative Romance Languages and Literatures Series. Vol. 215.
- (in Spanish) Solchaga Zamudio, Noé and Solchaga Peña, Luisa A., Efemérides Mexicanas, v. 1. Mexico City: Editorial Avante, 1992.
