= Imperial ruso =

Argentine cake

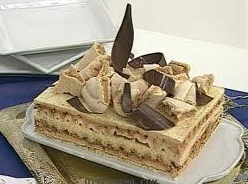
An Imperial Russian cake

The Imperial ruso or Imperial Russian is an Argentinian dessert from Buenos Aires. It is a French meringue cake stuffed with almonds and buttercream. Fruit can also be added to one's liking.

== History ==
Cayetano Brenna, an immigrant from Italy, arrived in Argentina in 1900. In 1904, he acquired a shop in the corner between Callao Avenue and Rivadavia Avenue in the city of Buenos Aires. After having made the deal, he opened the Confitería del Molino in 1917.

Brenna named the cake in honor of the execution of the Romanov monarchs during the 1917 Russian Revolution.

== See also ==
- Sans rival
- Mango float
- Ube cheesecake
- List of cakes
