= Fresnéu =

- Parish
- Location within Spain
- Country: Spain
- Autonomous community: Asturias
- Province: Asturias
- Municipality: Cabranes

Population
  - Total: 277

Fresnéu (Spanish: Fresnedo) is one of six parishes (administrative divisions) in Cabranes, a municipality within the province and autonomous community of Asturias, in northern Spain.

It is 11.09 km^{2} (4.28 sq mi) in size with a population of 277 (INE 2011).

== Villages ==
- Camás
- Candones
- La Curciada
- Fresnéu
- Fresnu
- Iría
- Naveda
- Piñera
- Viella
