= The Misfortunes of Alonso Ramírez =

1690 book by Carlos de Sigüenza y Góngora

The Misfortunes of Alonso Ramírez (Spanish: Infortunios de Alonso Ramírez) is a 1690 book by Carlos de Sigüenza y Góngora, a Mexican writer retelling the story of Alonso Ramírez, a Puerto Rican sailor from his first sailing as a ship's boy in 1675, to his arrival at Yucatan, Mexico, after which he served as a sailor based on Cavite, Philippines. At one point thought to be fictional, José Francisco Buscaglia-Salgado and the historian Fabio López-Lázaro have demonstrated the existence of Ramírez and the accuracy of the account of experiences with pirates, including William Dampier and Duncan Mackintosh. Among the most consequential findings of Buscaglia's research, as reported in the bilingual edition of 2019, is to have found the shipwreck site and the remains of Ramírez's frigate in Punta Herradura, Yucatán, Mexico.
