= Castrotierra de Valmadrigal =

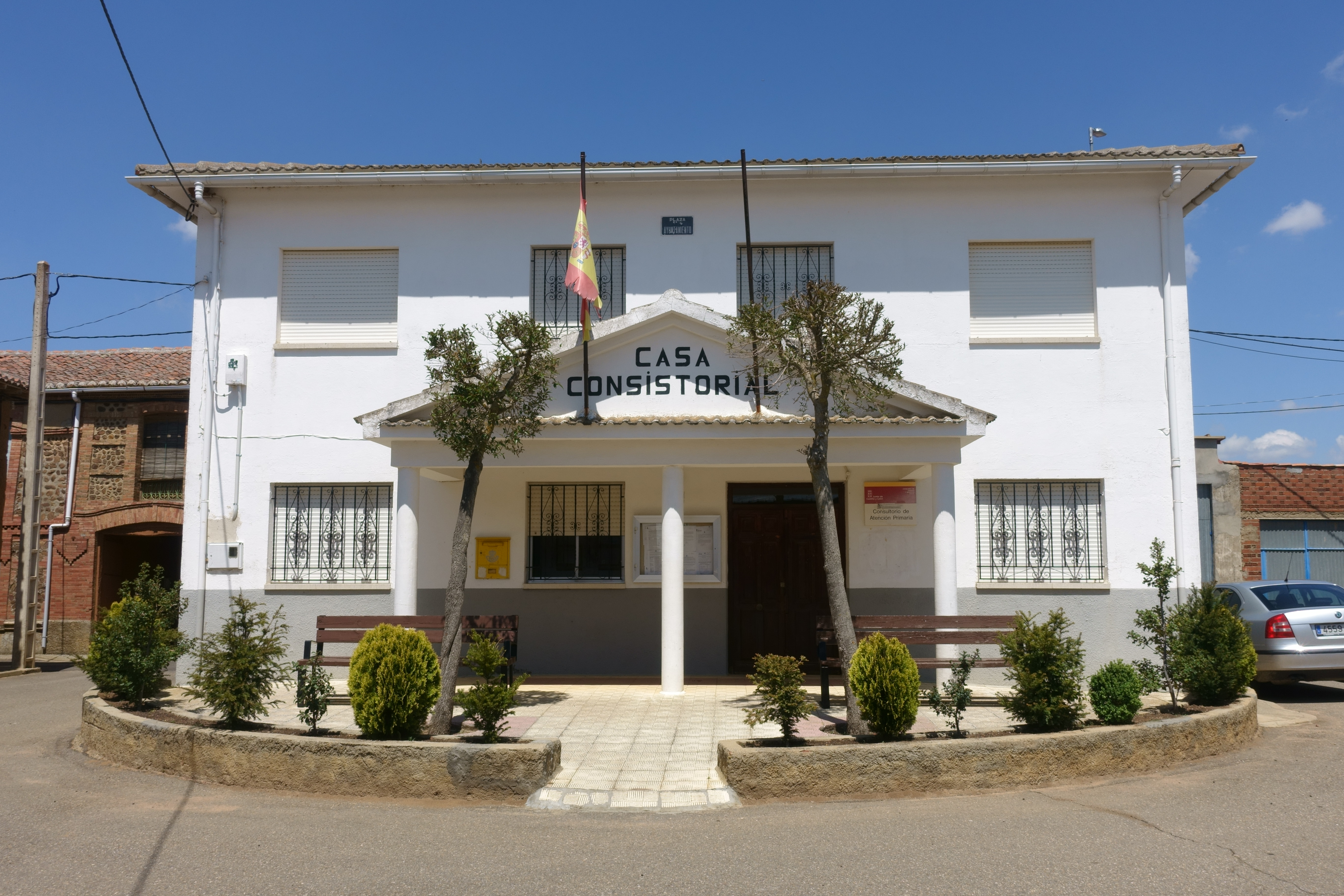
- Town hall

- Flag Coat of arms

- Location within Spain
- Coordinates: 42°20′39″N 5°15′7″W
- Country: Spain
- Autonomous community: Castile and León
- Province: León
- Municipality: Castrotierra de Valmadrigal

Government
  - Mayor: Agustín Paniagua Bajo (PP)

Area
  - Total: 23.50 km^{2} (9.07 sq mi)
- Elevation: 850 m (2,790 ft)

Population (2025-01-01)
  - Total: 106
  - Density: 4.51/km^{2} (11.7/sq mi)
- Time zone: UTC+1 (CET)
  - Summer (DST): UTC+2 (CEST)
- Postal Code: 24323
- Telephone prefix: 987
- Climate: Cfb
- Website: Ayto. de Castrotierra de Valmadrigal

Castrotierra de Valmadrigal (Spanish pronunciation: [kastɾoˈtjera ðe βalma.ðɾiˈɣal]), is a municipality located in the province of León, Castile and León, Spain. According to the 2010 census (INE), the municipality has a population of 124 inhabitants.
