= Meira Abbey =

Cistercian monastery in Meira, Spain

Coordinates: 43°12′48″N 7°18′00″W

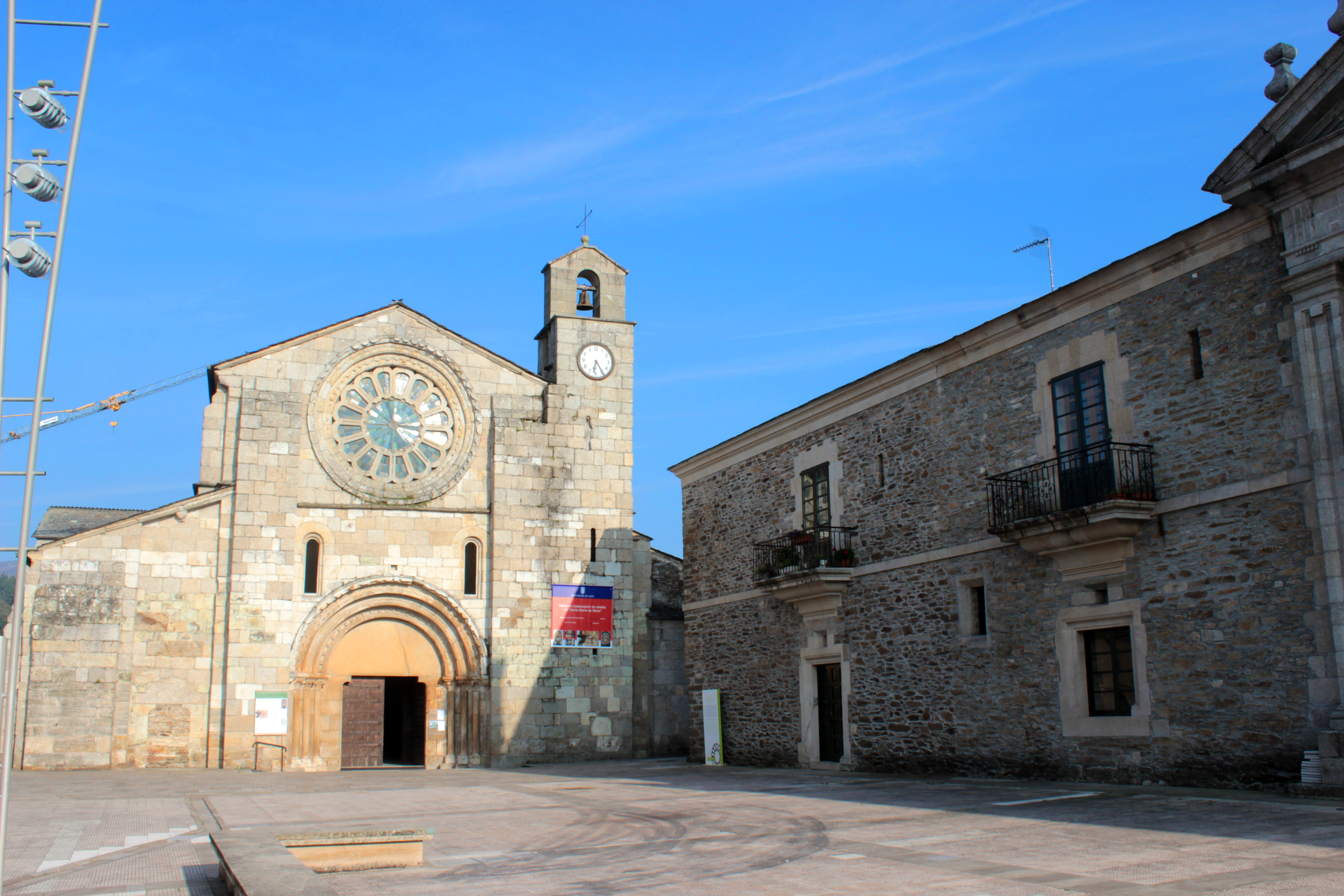
Main frontage of the monastery

Meira Abbey (Spanish: Mosteiro de Santa María de Meira) is a former Cistercian monastery in Meira, province of Lugo, Galicia, Spain.

It was founded as a daughter house of Clairvaux Abbey, probably in 1143. It received endowments from the kings Alfonso VII, Ferdinand II and Alfonso IX. In 1515 it joined the Cistercian Castilian Congregation. In the 17th century a school of higher philosophy was established here. The abbey was suppressed in 1835 during the dissolution of the monasteries of the Mendizábal government. The only structure to survive is the church, now a parish church, since 1931 a national monument.
