= Priaranza del Bierzo =

Coordinates: 42°31′N 6°40′W

- municipality
- Coat of arms
- Interactive map of Priaranza del Bierzo
- Country: Spain
- Autonomous community: Castile and León
- Province: León
- Region: El Bierzo
- Municipality: Priaranza del Bierzo

Area
  - Total: 33 km^{2} (13 sq mi)

Population (2025-01-01)
  - Total: 672
  - Density: 20/km^{2} (53/sq mi)
- Time zone: UTC+1 (CET)
  - Summer (DST): UTC+2 (CEST)
- Climate: Csb

Priaranza del Bierzo (Priaranza del Bierzu in Leonese language) is a village and municipality located in the region of El Bierzo (province of León, Castile and León, Spain) . According to the 2025 census (INE), the municipality has a population of 672 inhabitants.

In 2000, the exhumation of the mass grave at the entrance to the village, containing the remains of victims of the Spanish Civil War, was completed. This initiative led to the subsequent creation of the Association for the Recovery of Historical Memory.

== Towns ==
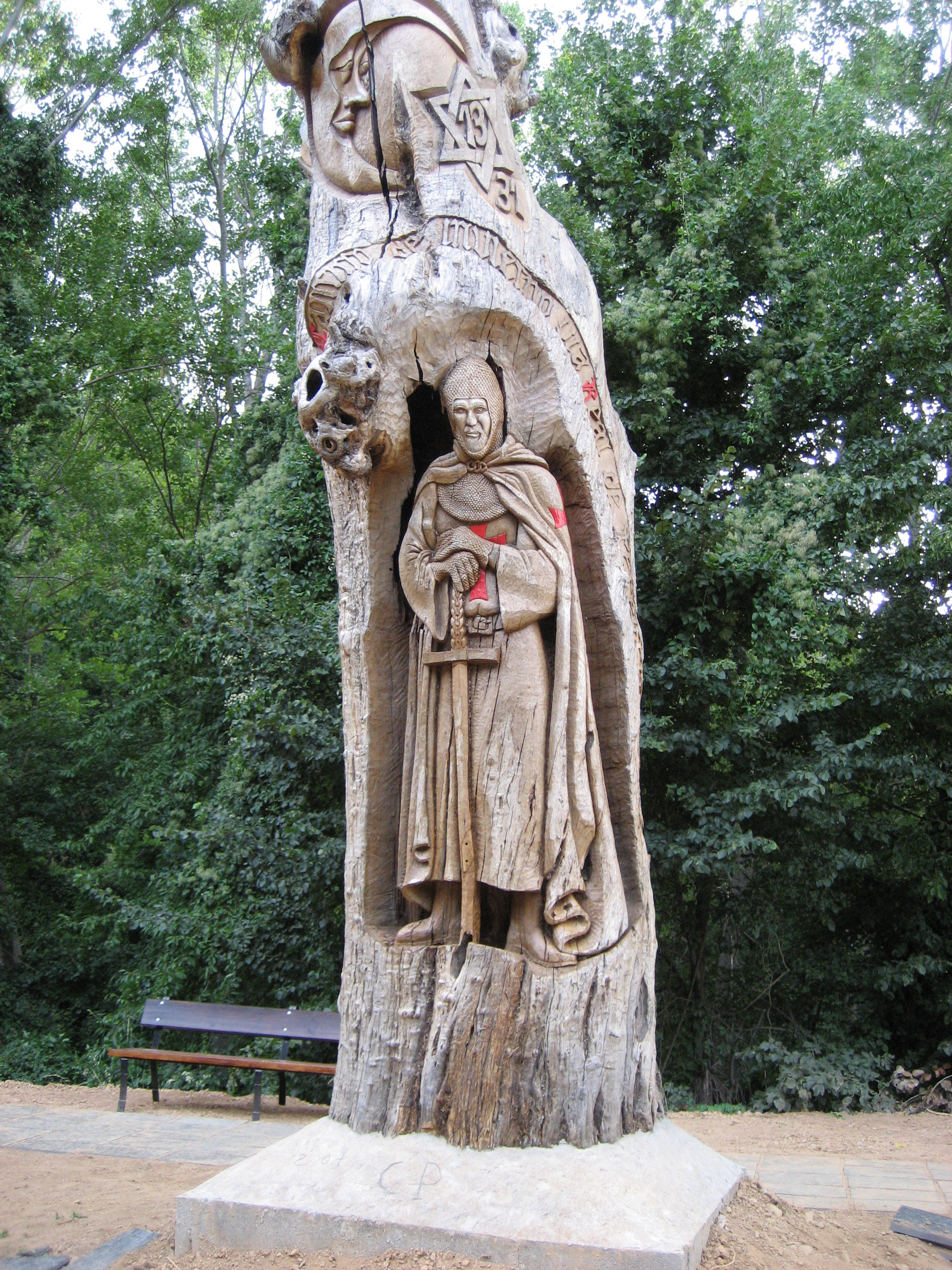
Templar Knight in a tree of Santalla del Bierzo town (Priaranza del Bierzo).

- Priaranza del Bierzo
- Villalibre de la Jurisdicción
- Santalla del Bierzo
- Paradela de Muces
- Villavieja
- Cornatel

== Cornatel Castle (Ulver) ==
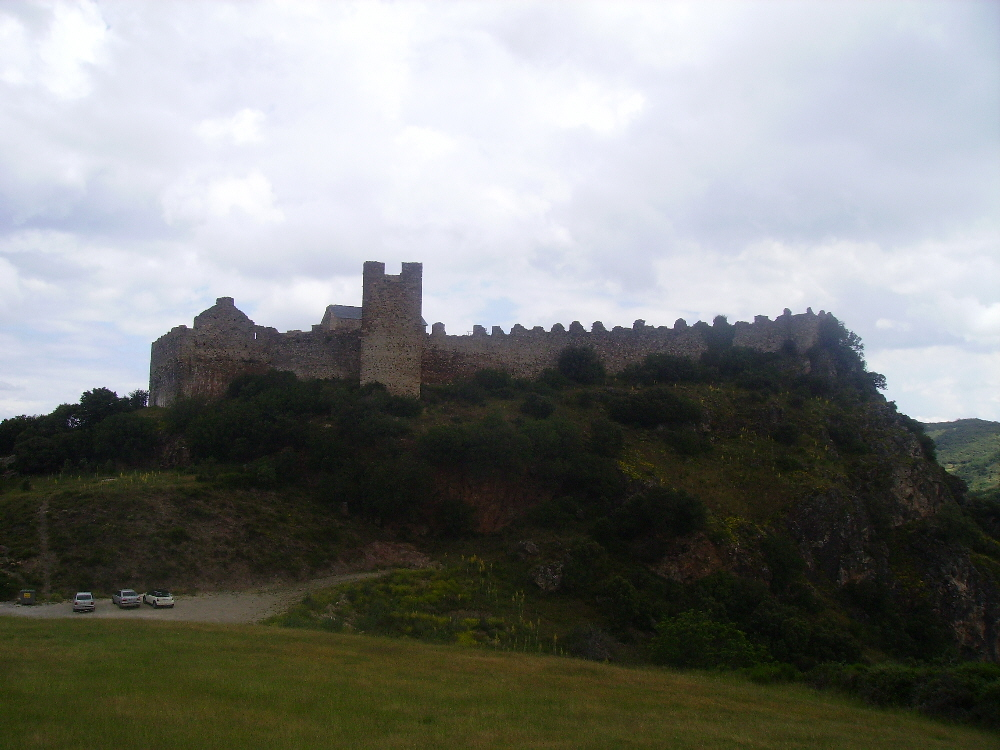
The Cornatel Castle in Priaranza del Bierzo, built in the 9th century.

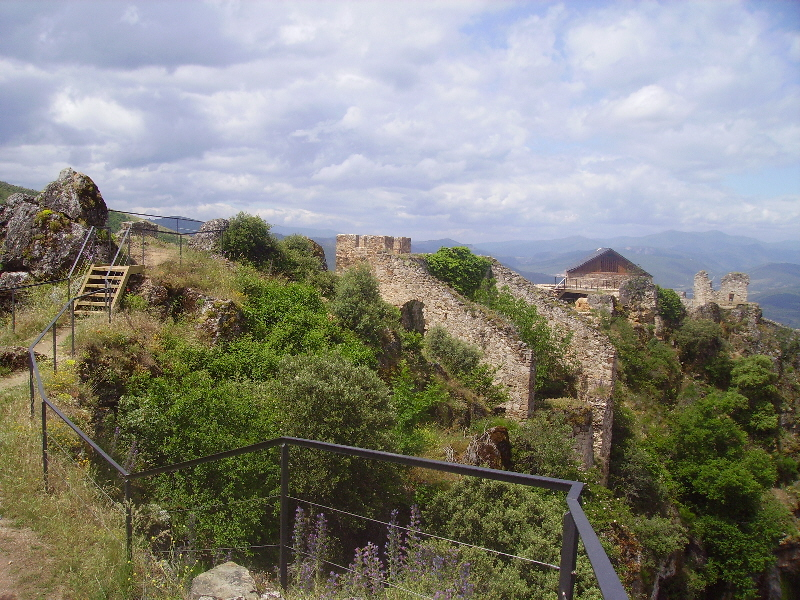
Cornatel Castle as seen from the Hanging House.

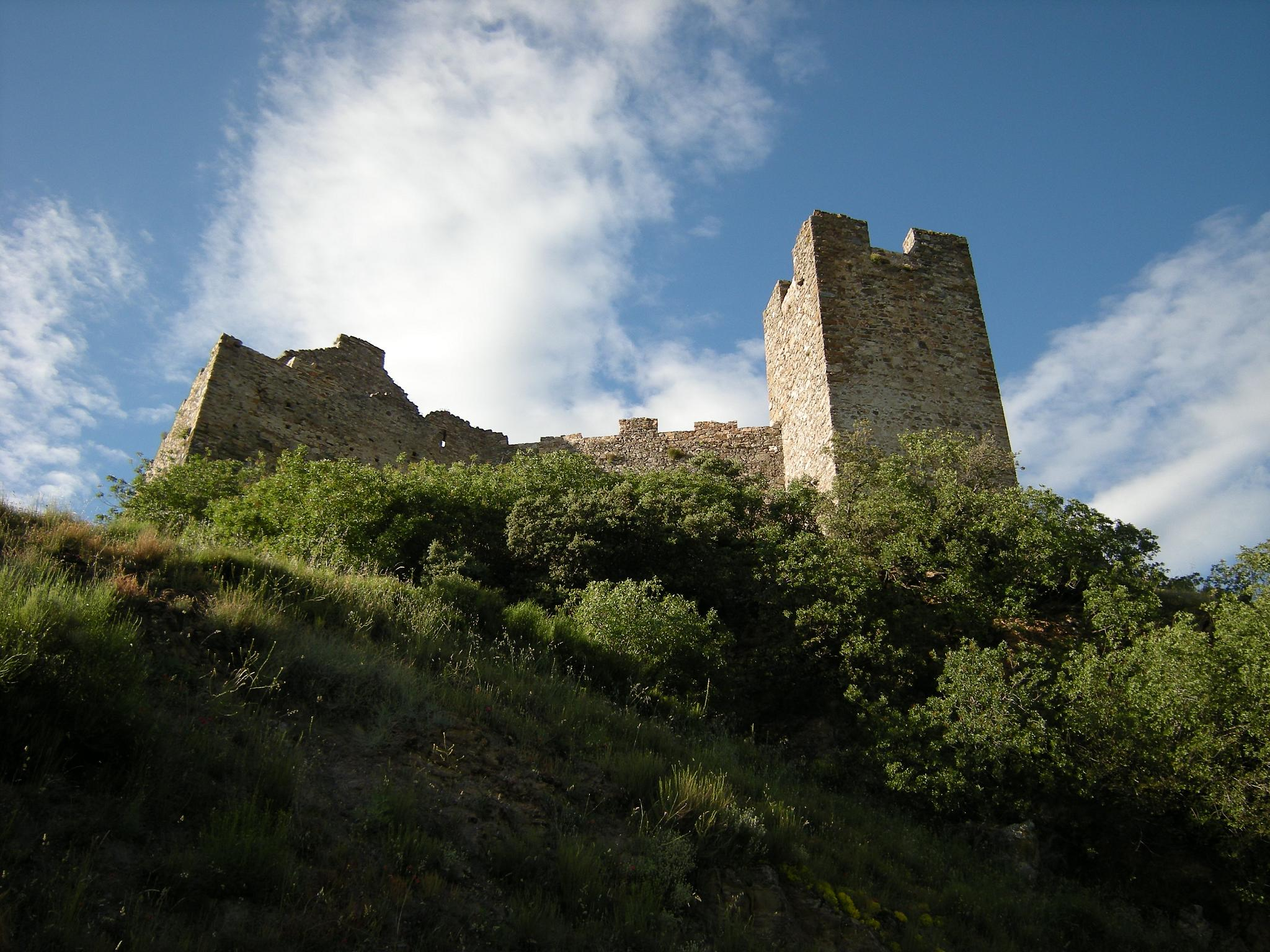
View of the southern side.

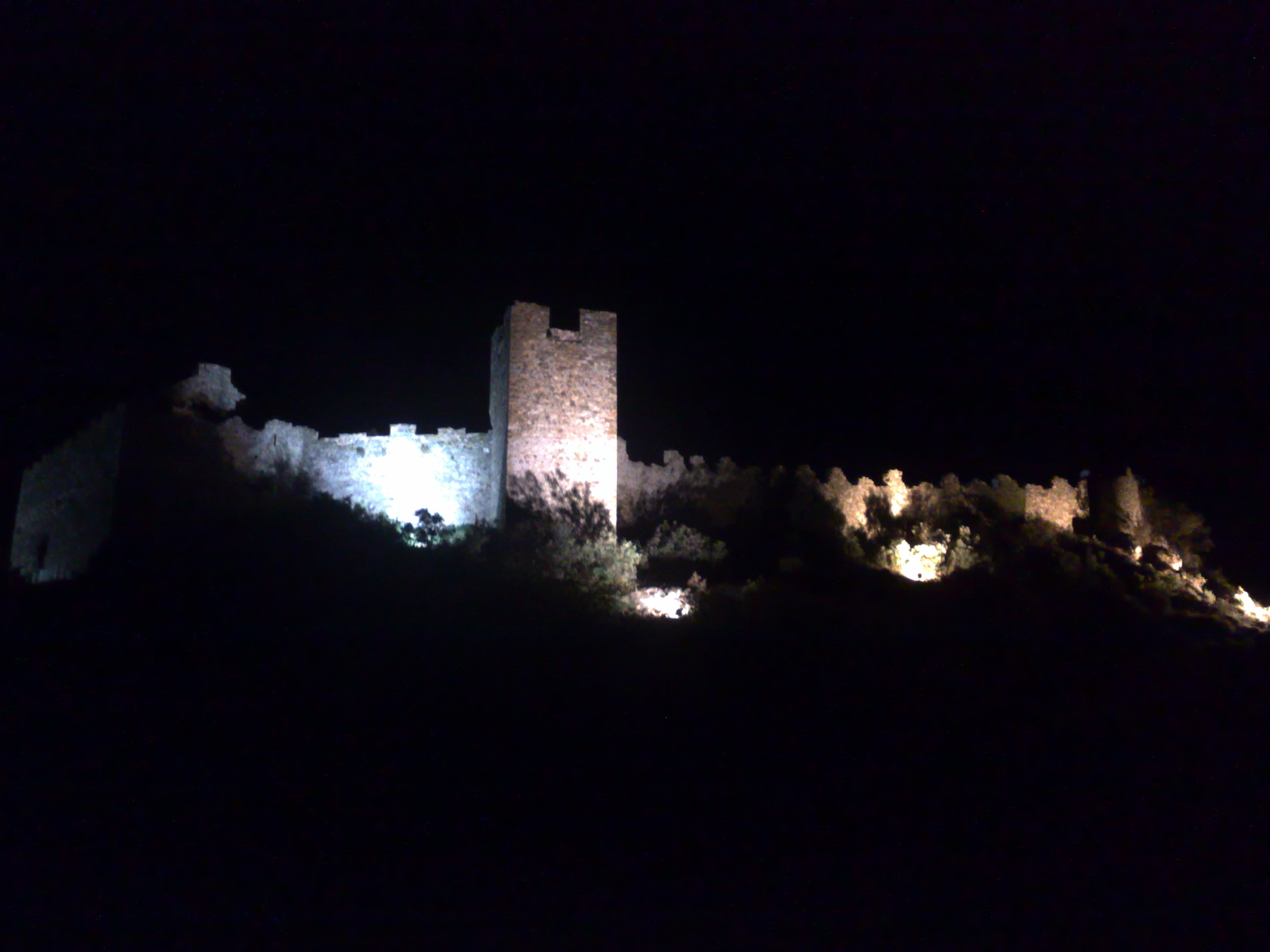
View of the Cornatel Castle at night.

== Festivities ==
The own festivities are:

- Priaranza: Las Candelas and El Salvador.
- Villalibre: San Antonio Abad, San Juan Bautista, Nuestra Señora and San Roque.
- Santalla: Santa Marina.
- Paradela: San Miguel.
- Villavieja: Santiago.
- Ferradillo: San Bartolomé.
