= Traba =

Traba or Trąba may refer to:

== People ==
- House of Traba, a medieval Galician noble family
  - Froila Vermúdez de Traba (died 1091)
  - Pedro Fróilaz de Traba (fl. 1086–1126)
  - Fernando Pérez de Traba (fl. c.1090–c.1155)
  - Bermudo Pérez de Traba (died 1168)
  - Rodrigo Pérez de Traba (fl. 1111–c.1160)
  - Gonzalo Fernández de Traba (died 1160)
  - Teresa Fernández de Traba (died 1180)
  - Fernando González de Traba (fl. 1159–1165)
  - Gómez González de Traba (fl. 1164–1209)
- Mikołaj Trąba (1358–1422), Polish prelate
- Marta Traba (1930–1983), Argentine art critic
- Robert Traba (born 1958), Polish historian

== Places ==
Galicia

- San Miguel de Filgueira de Traba, a parish (parroquia) in the council (concello) of Oza-Cesuras in the county (comarca) of Betanzos
- Santa María de Traba, a parish in the council of Coristanco in the county of Bergantiños
- Santiago de Traba, a parish in the council of Laxe in the county of Bergantiños
- Ponte de Traba, a place in the parish of Noia in the council of the same name
- Traba, Araño, a place in the council of Rianxo
- Traba, Xallas de Castriz, a place in the council of Santa Comba
- Traba (river)

Poland

- Trąba, Greater Poland Voivodeship, a settlement in Poland

== Other things ==
- Trąby coat of arms

Trąba in the Polish language means:

- 'Trąba powietrzna" – tornado (literally 'Air trumpeter')
- 'Trąba' – proboscis/nose of an elephant
