= Gómez González de Traba =

Galician nobleman

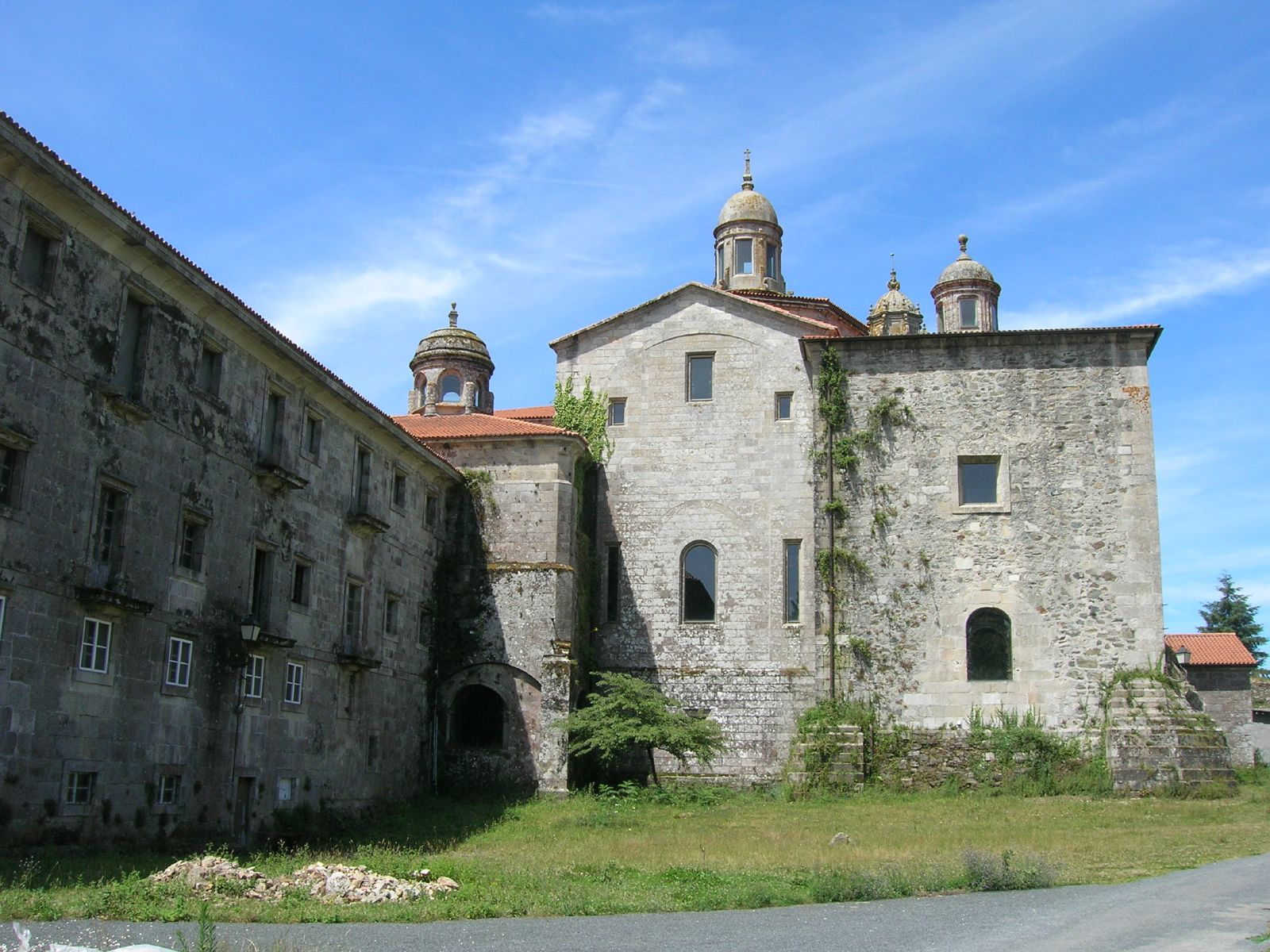
Sobrado dos Monxes, founded by his grandfather in 1142, was four times endowed by Gómez between 1165 and 1180

Gómez González de Traba (fl. 1164–1209) was a Galician nobleman, a count from 1169, and a wealthy and influential figure in the Kingdom of León. He was the second son of Gonzalo Fernández de Traba and his first wife, Elvira Rodríguez. His elder brother, Fernando González, died prematurely in 1166 and Gómez became the head of the House of Traba.

Throughout his career Gómez was the tenant (tenente, ruler on behalf of the king) of Trastámara, a traditional Traba stronghold. He received it on the death of his brother in 1166 and ruled it probably until his death (at least to 1208). He only held Traba, his family's namesake, briefly in 1168, the same year he received the tenancy of A Coruña (then called Faro), which he held into 1169. His power at this stage was still mainly in Galicia, where he received Montenegro in 1169 and Monterroso in 1170. He held onto the latter until 1173, when he was replaced by Gómez González of Castile until 1179. Thereafter he continued to hold it until 1200, and then once more in 1204. He lost Montenegro until 1183, but held thereafter until 1200 with two brief interruptions (1188–89, 1190–92).

In 1173 Gómez was granted the tenancy of Cervantes in Galicia and also the vast borderland of the Extremadura in the south of the realm. In 1175 he held the tenancies of the Bierzo, Ulver, and Villabuena. Between 1176 and 1177 he held Salamanca, the rising second city of the kingdom. In 1178 King Ferdinand II ceded all his rights in the town of Guitiriz to Gómez. In 1181 he was granted the rule of the Galician centres of San Pelayo de Lodo, Toroño (which he retained until 1185), and Túy. In 1182 he was back governing the Extremadura for a second term and also received Ribadeo. On the death of Ferdinand II and the succession of his son Alfonso IX in 1188, Gómez was transferred to the tenancies of Monforte de Lemos and the Limia. In 1189 he was transferred to Sarria, where he remained until 1200, along with his other Galician fiefs of Montenegro and Monterroso. In 1193 Alfonso IX appointed him majordomo, the highest office in the kingdom. In 1200, for reasons unknown, he fell from favour at Alfonso's court and can only be traced there on one occasion (in 1201) between then and the summer of 1204, when he was restored to favour.

Gómez was a regular patron of the Cistercian monastery of Sobrado dos Monxes that had been founded by his grandfather, Fernando Pérez de Traba, endowing it with gifts on four separate occasions in 1165, 1166, 1171, and 1180. Later in life he favoured other foundations, showing generosity to the Cathedral of Santiago de Compostela (1186), the Cistercians of Carracedo (1191), the regular clergy of Caabeiro (1196), and the Benedictines of Lourenzá (1201). There is an odd surviving charter dated 6 January 1165 by which Gómez made a donation to the Benedictine monastery at Jubia "for the remedy of the souls of my father and brother, the already deceased count Fernando González", though his brother was still living as late as 26 December that year. The charter is probably mis-dated, but the correct date is unknown.

Sometime before 1174 Gómez took as his first wife Elvira Pérez, daughter of Pedro Alfonso and María Fróilaz. She gave him two daughters, Urraca and Sancha, who married Gonzalo Pérez de Lara. By 1182 he was married to Miracle (Miraglia), daughter of Ermengol VII of Urgell and Douce. She is last recorded alive in 1195. Gómez's children by her were Fernando, Gonzalo, Rodrigo, and Velasco.
