= Gonzalo Fernández de Traba =

Galician noble; head of the House of Traba

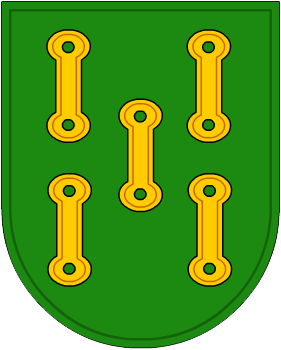
Coat of arms, house of Traba

Gonzalo Fernández de Traba (died 1160) was a Galician nobleman and the head of the Traba family. He was the eldest son and successor of Fernando Pérez de Traba by his wife Sancha González.

By 1 August 1150 Gonzalo had married a certain Elvira Rodríguez, a woman of unknown origins, with whom, on that date, he donated his portion of San Julián de Ezebreiro to the Cistercian monastery of Monfero. By 12 January 1156 he was re-married to Berenguela Rodríguez, daughter of Rodrigo Vélaz and Urraca Álvarez and sister of Álvaro Rodríguez, thus relating himself by marriage to the Vela family. His sons, all by his first wife, were Fernando, Gómez and Rodrigo. He also two daughters by his first wife: Urraca, who married Fruela Ramírez, and Aldonza, who married Lope Díaz I de Haro.

Gonzalo held the title of count, pertaining to the highest rank in the kingdom, by 4 February 1155, when he signed a royal charter at Valladolid as comes Gundisaluus. Since his father is never mentioned in royal documents after 8 November 1154, it is probable that he had died and his son had been named a count as his successor. This scheme is complicated two charters of donation dated 1 July 1155 by Fernando and his brother Vermudo to the monastery they had founded at Sobrado dos Monxes. If authentic, these charters would push his date of death back a half-year and demonstrate that Gonzalo held the comital rank within his father's lifetime. Two documents in the archives of Sobrado, dated 1151 and June 1160, are confirmed by a comes dompnus Fernandus in Traua et in Aranga et in Monteroso ("count Don Fernando in Traba and in Aranga and in Monterroso") and a comes dompnus Fernandus senior in Monteroso et in Traua ("count Don Fernando, lord in Monterroso and in Traba"), respectively. These are probably copyists' errors for Gundesaluus Fernandi (Gonzalo Fernández).

Although Gonzalo is first mentioned in a document of 1 August 1140, his public life began with the death of his father and the assumption of the comital title. By December 1155 the government of the tenencia (fief) of Trastámara had been confided in him. He is last recorded ruling there in January 1159. By February 1156 he had been invested with the tenencias of Aranga and Traba, which he kept until his death. Trastámara and Traba, though not patrimonial lands, were royal territories usually entrusted to members of the Traba family. In February 1160 the important fief of Monterroso was added to his domains, though there is some evidence that he held it from as early as 1157. A charter dated 1152 refers to him tenente ("holding") Monterroso, but goes on to name Ferdinand II of León (1157–88) as the reigning monarch.

Probably on 16 September 1159 Gonzalo came to an agreement with the Archbishop of Santiago, Martín Martínez and the canons of the Cathedral of Santiago concerning jurisdiction in Montaos. On 27 October 1159 Gonzalo made a donation to the important Benedictine monastery at Jubia in Galicia. He is last cited alive in a document of 9 September 1160 and another of 18 November explicitly refers to his death.
