= Fernando González de Traba =

Galician magnate

Fernando González de Traba or Fernão Gonçalves (fl. 1159–1165) was a Galician magnate and the head of the House of Traba in the Kingdom of León during the reign of Ferdinand II. He was the eldest son of Gonzalo Fernández de Traba and Elvira Rodríguez. He was the alférez of the realm from April 1159 until at least 31 July 1160. He was recognised as a count (Latin comes), the highest noble rank in the kingdom, by 13 January 1160 in Galicia, but the royal chancery did not so style him until 13 February 1161. He held the tenencias which his father had held: Aranga (1160–61), Traba (1160–61), Monterroso (1160–63), and Trastámara (1161–65), even holding all four simultaneously (at least from 2 June to 20 September 1161). He supported with donations the Cistercian monasteries of Sobrado (1162) and Monfero (1163). Fernando signed his last known charter on 26 December 1165. There exists a charter mistakenly dated 6 January 1165 by which his brother, Gómez González de Traba, made a donation to Jubia for the sake of his soul. He had no known wife or children.
