= Nuno Rodrigues =

Nuno Rodrigues may refer to:

- Nuno Rodrigues de Candarei (13th century), Galician-Portuguese troubadour
- Nuno Rodrigues (footballer, born 1979), Portuguese football left back
- Nuno Rodrigues (footballer, born 1994), Portuguese football midfielder
