= Nuno Rodrigues de Candarei =

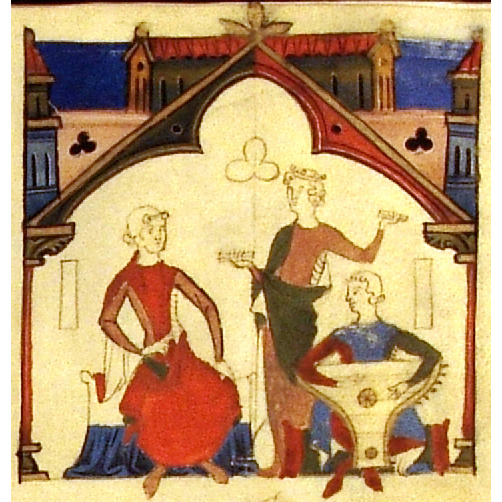
Miniature accompanying the song En gran coita vivo, sennor in the Cancioneiro da Ajuda

Nuno Rodrigues de Candarei (or Candarey) was a Galician-Portuguese troubadour active roughly in the period 1220–1260.

~==Life== Little is known of Nuno's biography. Even whether he was from Galicia or Portugal is uncertain.

If Galician, he may have been the son of Rodrigo Pais de Candrei, who is recorded as a vassal of Count Rodrigo Gómez de Traba between 1214 and 1230. Rodrigo Pais is known to have accompanied his lord in the service of King Ferdinand III along with one of his sons. Nuno may also have been related to Mendo de Candarei, to whom Alfonso X addressed some poems.

If Portuguese, he may have been the brother of Mem Rodrigues de Gondarei, recorded in 1258, or of Mor Rodrigues de Candarei, wife of Gomes Viegas de Basto.

Based on a double attribution, it has been suggested that Nuno Rodrigues and Nuno Porco are the same person, the latter being an unflattering nickname.

== Works ==
Nuno wrote at least three cantigas de amor:

- Bem devíades, mia senhor
- En gran coita vivo, sennor
- Em que grave dia, senhor, [em] que me vos Deus fez veer!

One other is attributed to him with less certainty, Nostro Senhor, em que vos mereci. In addition, a longer variant of En gran coita vivo with the same opening lines is preserved attributed to João de Gaia. It may be a kind of cantiga de seguir, a reworking of Nuno's poem. This theory originated with Mariagrazia Russo. André Penafiel calls the theory "unconventional ... though not impossible."

Canadian poet Erín Moure has published a translation/reworking of Em gram coita vivo in The Capilano Review.

== Bibliography ==
- Penafiel, André Barros (2016). The Emergence of the Cantigas d'Amor: A Philological Investigation of Poets, Genres, Manuscripts and their Compilers (PhD dissertation). University of Oxford.
- Kurtz, William S. (2018). "Dating cantigas" (PDF). Virtual Center for the Study of Galician-Portuguese Lyric.
- Moure, Erín (2005). "Transluçines from the Ajuda Codex by Calgarii Mourii". The Capilano Review. 2 (46): 89–96.
- Muriano Rodríguez, María Montserrat (1998). "En gran coita vivo, sennor (A68, B[181bis]/B1451, V1061): Un posible caso de reelaboración en la lírica gallego-portuguesa". Edición y anotación de textos: Actas del Primer Congreso de Jóvenes Filólogos. Vol. 2. Universidade da Coruña, Servizo de Publicacións. pp. 479–491.
