= Rodrigo Gómez de Traba =

13th century nobleman in the Kingdom of Galicia

Rodrigo Gómez de Traba, also called Ruy Gómez de Trastámara (Note: Ruy is a variant of Rodrigo.) (fl. 1201–1260), was a Galician nobleman of the House of Traba. (Note: The name "de Traba" is not contemporary, but has been applied by historians to all the members of a family with close ties to the royal castle of Traba.)

He was the third son of Count Gómez González de Traba and his second wife, Miraglia, daughter of Count Ermengol VII of Urgell. His parents' marriage took place before 1182. Rodrigo's brothers were Fernando, Gonzalo and Velasco. His uncle was Rodrigo González de Traba. On 18 May 1201, Gómez González gave half of the church of Santo Tomé to the nearby monastery of Villanueva de Lorenzana and his sons Velasco and Rodrigo confirmed the donation. Sometime before 1218, Rodrigo married Mayor, daughter of Alfonso Téllez de Meneses and a daughter of Rodrigo Gutiérrez Girón.

Rodrigo was one of the most loyal and favoured magnates of King Alfonso IX of Galicia and León. By the 1220s, he was one of only three Galician or Leonese magnates (Note: The others were Rodrigo Fernández de Valduerna and Fernando Gutiérrez de Lemos.) to regularly attend Alfonso's diminished court at a time when it was dominated by Pedro and Martim Sanches, the illegitimate sons of King Sancho I of Portugal. From the 1220s, Rodrigo also held the royal fiefs of Trastámara and Monteroso, which his father had also held on behalf of the crown. In 1230, Rodrigo acquired Montenegro, another one of his father's former fiefs, after it was taken away from Martim Sanches. He did not, however, receive his father's old fief of Sarria, which was also taken from Martim at the time, but was handed to the Fróilaz family. Rodrigo governed the three Galician fiefs continually down to 1252.

Private documents issued in Rodrigo's fiefs continue to name him in their dating clauses until May 1260. The first reference to his death is in a bull issued by Pope Urban IV on 28 March 1263, which prohibited the bishop and chapter of Mondoñedo from alienating an encomienda granted to them by the late Rodrigo. (Note: This was not his only donation to a church. In 1229, Rodrigo donated his possessions in a place called Lea to the bishop and chapter of Lugo.) He was probably dead by November 1262, when Alfonso Rodríguez appears as lord of Montenegro.
