= Fernando Pérez de Traba =

12th-century nobleman and count of the Kingdom of León

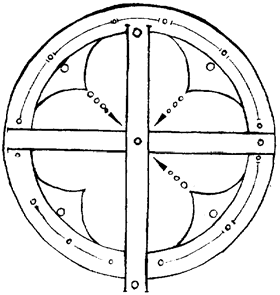
Signo rodado used by Fernando Pérez de Traba

Fernando (or Fernán) Pérez de Traba (Spanish: [feɾˈnando ˈpeɾeθ ðe ˈtɾaβa, feɾˈnam -]; c. 1090 – 1 November 1155), or Fernão Peres de Trava (Portuguese: [fɨɾˈnɐ̃w ˈpeɾɨʒ ðɨ ˈtɾavɐ]), was a nobleman and count of the Kingdom of León who for a time held power over all Galicia. He became the lover of Countess Teresa of Portugal, through whom he attained great influence in that domain, and was the de facto ruler of the County of Portugal between 1121 and 1128. The Poema de Almería, a Latin poem celebrating one of Alfonso VII's major victories of the Reconquista, records that "if one were to see him [Fernán], one would judge him already a king."

== Family ==
Fernán was the second son of Pedro Fróilaz de Traba, founder of the House of Traba, and his first wife, Urraca Fróilaz. His family was the most powerful in Galicia at the time, and he himself held properties in the most important Galician cities: Lugo and Santiago de Compostela. Fernán's first appearance in the surviving documentation dates from September 1107, just after the death of Raymond of Galicia, when his father confirmed a privilege of Alfonso VI for the monastery of Caaveiro, along with his sons. (Note: Comes Petrus de Gallecia: Fernandus et Veremudus eius filii, where Fernán, the younger, signs before his elder brother. Barton cites Fernán's earliest document as dated 1 May 1110.)

Early in the twelfth century (before 1125), Pedro gave his son a Moorish cook, probably a slave, with the Christian name Martin. Sometime early in the century Fernán took a wife, but they were separated when he became the lover of Theresa Alfónsez, Countess of Portugal. With Teresa he had two daughters: Sancha (born c. 1121), who married Álvaro Rodríguez, and Teresa, who first married Nuño Pérez de Lara and, when widowed, became the second wife of King Ferdinand II of León. Fernán's only attested wife, Sancha González, daughter of Gonzalo Ansúrez and Urraca Vermúdez, was therefore possibly his second wife. The earliest record of their marriage is from 1134. With her the count had three children: Gonzalo, María (married Ponce de Cabrera), and Urraca, the wife of Juan Arias. Sancha was still living on 24 July 1161, when she signed a document, noting that she was a widow. Probably in that same year she drew up her will. It is preserved, albeit with an incorrect date, in the cartulary Tumbo C of Santiago de Compostela, since the archbishop-elect of Santiago, Fernando Curialis, was a beneficiary.

== Relationship with the Archdiocese and the Crown ==
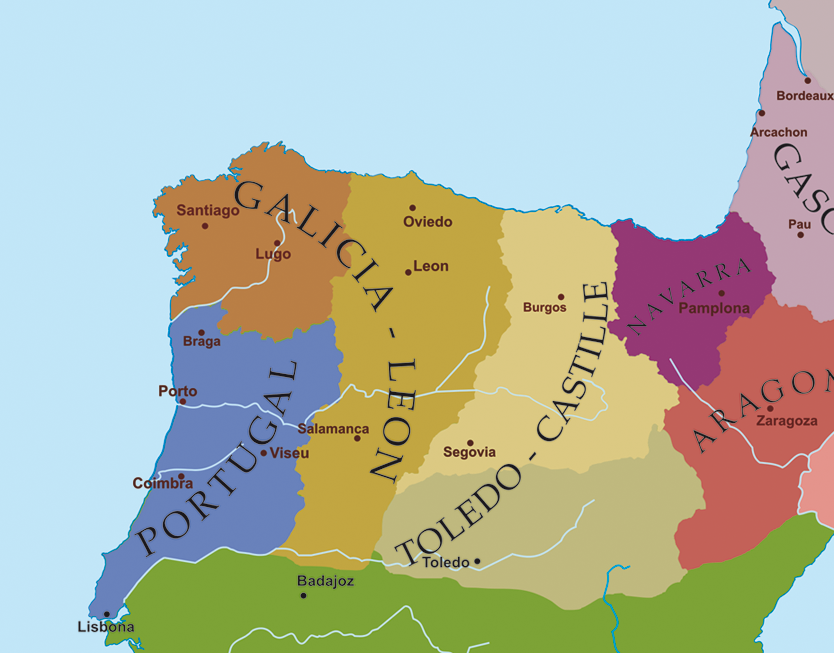
In the 1120s Fernán's power extended over almost all of Galicia and Portugal. His influence helped effect the division (1157) between Galicia and León on one side and Castile and Toledo on the other. Fernán's activities extended as far east as Navarre, where he made war alongside Alfonso VII, and far to the south of the border, where he engaged in the Reconquista.

In Galicia, Fernán rivalled for influence the archbishop Diego Gelmirez, with whom he kept an uneasy truce. Originally, the archbishop and Fernán had been on good terms. At the time of the Galician revolt (1116) he was acting as Diego's constable (municeps). In 1121, however, he had constructed a fortress at Raneta south of Santiago, a position threatening to the apostolic see. The archbishop promptly had it destroyed. (Note: As his biographer relates in the Historia compostellana.)He may have been incited by the queen, who was trying to separate Diego from the Trabas to prevent an alliance of regional powers in Galicia from defying the crown. Fernán also mediated between his elder brother Bermudo and the archbishop in 1121, resulting in Diego bestowing gifts on the Vermudo in return for the fortress of Faro, which he claimed belonged to the diocese. In 1134 the dispute with Diego flared up once more after Fernán imprisoned one of his knights and the archdeacon of Nendos, Pedro Crescónez, whose jurisdiction covered large parts of the Traba patrimony.

During the reign of Queen Urraca, Fernán's family was generally allied with her son, the young Alfonso Raimúndez, who had been raised for a time alongside Fernán in the household of Pedro Fróilaz. The Trabas, allied with Diego, tried to make Alfonso king in Galicia in opposition to his mother. With the death of queen Urraca in 1126 and the accession of Alfonso, Fernán became the leading figure in Galicia and used the opportunity to increase his power throughout the kingdom. Together with Teresa he signed a truce with the new king (shortly after March 1126) at Ricobayo near Zamora. In 1149 Alfonso entrusted to him the mentoring of his second son, the future Ferdinand II. (Note: He was Ferdinand's tutor from at least 1 March 1149 to 16 May 1150.) Long after Fernán's own death, in 1178, his daughter Teresa married Ferdinand II as his second wife and her second husband. According to the Chronica latina regum Castellae and the De rebus Hispaniae, Fernán's influence was so decisive during the reign of Alfonso VII, that by the king's testament Galicia and León were separated from the kingdoms of Castile and Toledo. The anonymous Chronica claims that Fernán and Manrique Pérez de Lara "aimed to sow the seed of discord" when they proposed the division of Alfonso VII's "empire".

== De facto ruler of Portugal (1121–1128) ==
In 1116 Fernán participated in a Galician revolt against Queen Urraca. The revolt was led by his father on behalf of Teresa, the widow of Henry of Burgundy, Count of Portugal. The victories in battle at Vilasobroso and Lanhoso sealed the alliance between the Traba family and Teresa. Fernán became her governor in Porto and Coimbra (bearing the title "lord of Coimbra and Portugal"). (Note: His power in Coimbra lasted from at least 6 April 1121 to 31 March 1128, according to Barton, 242 n19. Both Bernard F. Reilly (1982), The Kingdom of León-Castilla under Queen Urraca, 1109–1126 (Princeton: Princeton University Press), 153, and Fletcher, 148, dated it from a 24 January 1121 document in the archives of the monastery of Lorvão.) By 1 February 1121 he was using the title comes (Latin for "count"), the highest in the kingdom, even though his father was still alive and his brother Vermudo had not yet received it, a sure indication of the influence of Teresa. In 1122 Fernán received a further two castles from her and had probably already become her lover. It has been suggested that they may have married, but Fernán was publicly rebuked by the future saint Theotonius for this affair. (Note: Fletcher, 39, citing the Vita Theotonii, in Portugaliae Monumenta Historica, Scriptores, ed. A. Herculano (Lisbon, 1856), 79-88. Reilly, 153, speculates about a marriage.) In that same year (1122) Fernán was able to arrange the advantageous marriage of Vermudo to Urraca Enríquez, daughter of Teresa and Henry.

Teresa of Portugal had assumed the regency of the county of Portugal during the minority of her son Afonso Henriques. In 1122, after turning fourteen, Afonso knighted himself in the Cathedral of Zamora, raised an army, and proceeded to take control of his lands. Gathering the Portuguese knights to his cause against his mother and Fernán, he defeated them both at the Battle of São Mamede in 1128. From this year—which was also that of his father's death—Fernán concentrated his influence in Galicia, signing himself comes Fernandus de Gallecie ("Count Ferdinand of Galicia"), a title his father had used. He does soon reappear in Portuguese documents, indicating a normalising of relations between him and Afonso.

== Role in the defence of the realm under Alfonso VII ==
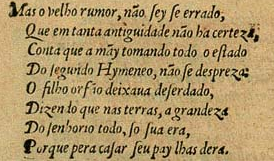
But now no more in tented fields oppos'd,
By Tagus' stream his honour'd age lie clos'd;
Yet still his dauntless worth, his virtue lived,
And all the father in the son survived.
And soon his worth was prov'd, the parent dame
Avow'd a second hymeneal flame.
The low-born spouse assumes the monarch's place,
And from the throne expels the orphan race.
But young Alphonso, like his sires of yore
(His grandsire's virtues, as his name, he bore),
Arms for the fight, his ravish'd throne to win;
And the lac'd helmet grasps his beardless chin.
—Camoens, The Lusiads
(Canto III, part of 28–31) (Note: Translation from the 1887 edition of William Julius Mickle's (1776) translation, p. 69 and n1.)

The first tenencia Fernán received from the king was the Limia in 1131. He soon received Trastámara (ruled 1132–45), which was long to be associated with the patrimonies of the Traba. In 1137 he was given the rule of Trasancos and in 1140 that of Monterroso, which he held as late as 1153. In 1140 Fernán signed Alfonso VII's charter ordering that he and his queen be buried in the Cathedral of Santiago de Compostela. Fernán signed as "count Don Fernando of Traba" (comes dominus Fernandus de Traua), the only time he is ever referred to in contemporary a document with the toponym "de Traba" by which he is now universally known.

In June 1137 Fernán probably participated in the recapture of Túy, although the Historia compostellana alleges that the Galician magnates responsible for the defence of the frontier with Portugal were too slow in answering the royal summons and had to be bribed by Diego Gelmírez to join the royal army. Fernán appears to have been the only Galician to follow the king to the Navarrese frontier later that year. He was with the royal army at Logroño on 3 October, though by 20 October Rodrigo Vélaz had also joined the army on the Ebro.

Fernán defended with difficulty the valley of the Minho against the onslaughts of Afonso Henriques, as recorded by the Chronica Adefonsi imperatoris:

Prior to [1140], the Portuguese monarch had come to Galicia several times, but always he had been driven back by Fernando Pérez and Rodrigo Vélaz and other Galician leaders. Often he was forced to return to Portugal dishonored. (Note: Glenn Edward Lipskey (1972), The Chronicle of Alfonso the Emperor (Northwestern University PhD dissertation) [hereafter CAI], I, §76.)

In 1139 or 1140, at Cerneja (Cernesa) in Galicia, he and Rodrigo Vélaz were defeated by Teresa's son Afonso Henriques, who by that time had proclaimed himself king of Portugal. The Battle of Cerneja is recorded in the Chronica Adefonsi:

Once more Alfonso, King of Portugal, gathered his army and went to Limia. When this news reached Galicia, Fernando Pérez and Rodrigo Vélaz and other of the Emperor's Galician nobles were summoned immediately. They marched out with their troops against the Portuguese King and met him at Cernesa. After the battle lines were drawn up, they began to fight. Because of their sins the Counts fled and were defeated.

The record of Fernán's rule in Deza consists of an original royal charter of July 1144. In 1146 he held the tenencias Monforte de Lemos and Sarria. Between 1144 and 1155 Fernán was frequently at court, and he participated in almost all of Alfonso VII's major campaigns of the Reconquista, commanding the Galician contingents on numerous occasions against the Almohads. The major exception was the conquest of Calatrava in January 1147. The chronicles do record his valour in the conquest of Córdoba in 1146, and in the conquest of Almería in 1147. At Almería he led the Galician contingent, and his presence can be traced with Alfonso's army on 19 August during its departure from Baeza and again on 25 November during its triumphant return. The Poema de Almería describes Fernán's role:

The valiant (strenuus) (Note: Barton renders it "brave".) Count Fernando Pérez follows this armed troop [of Galicians] administering the Galician laws with royal care. His position had been strengthened by his tutoring of the Emperor's son. If one were to see him, one would judge him already a king. He is famed for his royal nobility, and because he bears a count's lineage. (Note: Barton (2006), numbers these lines 74–78, while Glenn Edward Lipskey (1972), "The Poem of Almería", The Chronicle of Alfonso the Emperor (Northwestern University PhD dissertation), 165, numbers these lines 61–65.)

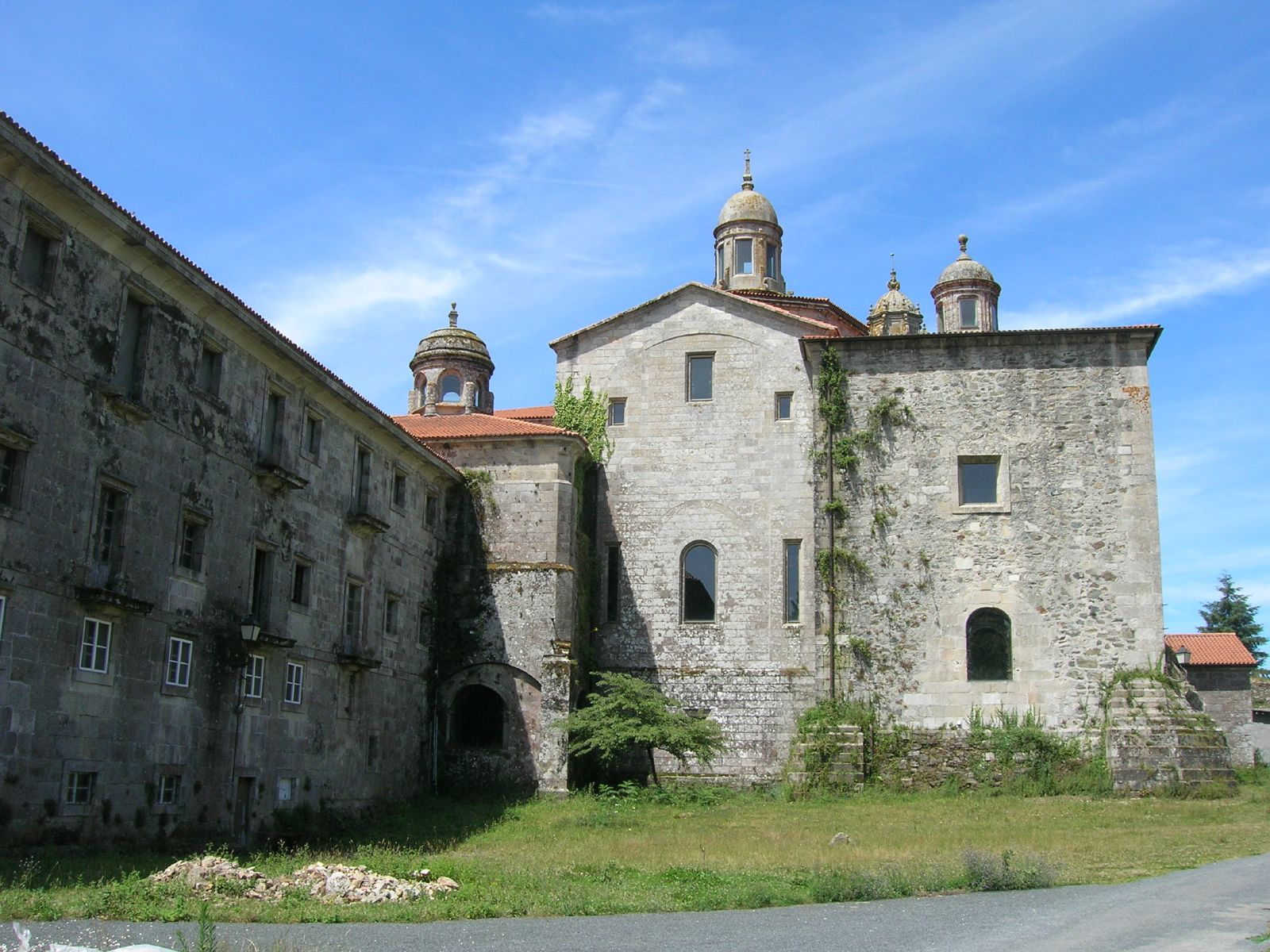
Sobrado dos Monxes, an abandoned royal monastery, was granted to Fernán and his brother Vermudo in 1118. In 1142 they established a Cistercian community there.

== Patronage and pilgrimage ==
Fernán actively supported the Cistercians, and patronised their monastery at Sobrado dos Monxes, which he and his brother Vermudo had first received from Queen Urraca on 29 July 1118, although it was deserted at the time and required its recipients to re-found a religious community there. (Note: The Trabas later claimed that Sobrado had once belonged to them and had been unjustly confiscated by Ferdinand I. This is a better indication of the reputation of Ferdinand I in Galicia than of anything else.) On the occasion of this gift, the Traba brothers responded in kind by giving a hound named Ulgar and a hunting spear to the queen's son. The gift of Sobrado was confirmed by Alfonso VII on 29 May 1135, but it was not until 14 February 1142 that the Trabas installed a Cistercian abbot, Peter, and some monks, referred to as "all the holy men of God and Saint Benedict, living according to the custom of the Cistercians". (Note: Fernán gave subsequent grants to the monastery in 1142, 1145, 1153, 1154, and perhaps 1155.) It was one of the earliest Cistercian foundations in Spain and a daughter house of Clairvaux Fernán and Vermudo may have desired that the monks contribute to settling and cultivating the surrounding zone. Fernán also made a donation to the Cistercian foundation of Monfero Abbey in 1145. (Note: There is a forged donation to this monastery dated 1147, with many errors.)

There are three donations by Fernán to the canons regular of Caaveiro dated 1 April 1104, 26 February 1135, and 4 December 1154, all forgeries. The cartulary of Caaveiro retains an unusually high number of forged documents and few authentic twelfth-century specimens. This may indicate that at some point in time the abbey's archives were lost or destroyed and the monks felt it necessary to forge deeds for properties that had really been granted. There is the possibility, therefore, that Fernán or his family was a regular donor to Caaveiro.

Fernán twice visited Jerusalem after the Second Crusade, the second time in 1153. He gave lands to the Templars on the coast near A Coruña, introducing this military order into the Galicia as early as 1128, before they had received official ecclesiastical approbation. In 1152 he made a donation to the Benedictine monastery of Xuvia. It is from this late period of his life that a certain document originates that records a donation of his to the favoured monastery of Sobrado, dated 1 May 1153. It is written in a francesa script, while Fernán's signature appears in a completely different script that resembles Visigothic. It may have been written by Fernán himself, in which case it represents the only evidence that he received any education besides the standard military one for young noblemen. He was brought up at a time when the francesa script had not yet crowded out the Visigothic, and the document of 1153 may indicate that he was taught in his youth how to write his name.

== Death and legacy ==
In 1151 Fernán was holding the tenencia of Búbal in Galicia and in 1152 that of Solís in western Asturias. The date of Fernán's death is very uncertain. He was last at court in Toledo on 8 November 1154 (Note: This document has been misdated at times to 1152.) and he never reappears in court records. By 4 February 1155, at Valladolid, his son Gonzalo was signing royal charters as comes Gundisaluus (Count Gonzalo), implying a succession in the comital title. There is a forged donation by Fernán to the monastery of Caaveiro dated 4 December 1154, in which the count refers to himself as graui infirmitate detemptus, "detained by a grave illness". The charter may have a basis in fact. There are also two charters of uncertain authenticity recording a donation dated 1 July 1155 by Fernán and his brother Vermudo to the monastery Fernán had founded at Sobrado dos Monxes.

There are two documents in the archives of Sobrado dated to June 1160 and 1161, confirmed by a comes dompnus Fernandus senior in Monteroso et in Traua ("count Don Fernando, lord in Monterroso and in Traba") and a comes dompnus Fernandus in Traua et in Aranga et in Monteroso ("count Don Fernando in Traba and in Aranga and in Monterroso"), respectively. These are probably copyists' errors for Gundesaluus Fernandi, the name of his son. Fernán died on 1 November 1155. Fernán was buried in the cloister of the Cathedral of Santiago de Compostela. (Note: Barton cites the request of his daughter María in January 1169 that she be buried beside him there.)

Fernán raised the scion of at least one other aristocratic family in his household. Count Froila Ramírez was raised at his court and in 1170, whether before their marriage or after is not known, he granted the monastery of Morás to his wife, Fernán's granddaughter, Urraca González, "out of love for your grandfather, Count Don Fernando, who raised me, and because of faithful service when I was accepted by your father, Count Don Gonzalo". (Note: The original Latin reads: propter amore auu uestri comitis domni Fernandi qui me creauit, et propter seruicium fidelem quem accepi a patre uestro comite domno Gundisaluo)

== Bibliography ==
=== Secondary sources ===
- Barón Faraldo, Andrés (2010). "Estructuras de vasallaje en el área eumesa durante el siglo XII. El círculo de Fideles del conde Fernando Pérez de Traba" (PDF). Cátedra. Revista eumesa de estudios (in Spanish) (17): 163–186. ISSN 1133-9608. Archived from the original (PDF) on 2017-02-02.
- Barton, Simon (1997). The Aristocracy in Twelfth-century León and Castile. Cambridge: Cambridge University Press. ISBN 9780521497275.
- Barton, Simon (2002). "The 'Discovery of Aristocracy' in Twelfth-Century Spain: Portraits of the Secular Élite in the Poem of Almería". Bulletin of Hispanic Studies. 83 (6). Liverpool: University of Santiago de Compostela: 453–469. doi:10.3828/bhs.83.6.1. ISSN 1475-3839.
- Daviña Sáinz, Santiago (1998). "El monasterio de las Cascas (Betanzos) (I)" (PDF). Anuario Brigantino (in Spanish) (21). Braga: Consello de Betanzos, A Coruña Câmara Municipal de Braga: 77–102. OCLC 72890459.
- Fletcher, Richard A. (1984). Saint James's Catapult: The Life and Times of Diego Gelmírez of Santiago de Compostela. Oxford: Oxford University Press.
- Francisco Olmos, José María de (2009). "El Signo Rodado Regio en España: Origen, Desarrollo y Consolidación (Siglos XII–XV)". Real Academia Matritense de Heráldica y Genealogía.
- González Vázquez, Marta (1998). "El agua y sus sistemas de suministro en la Compostela medieval" (PDF). In F. Bores; J. Fernández; S. Huerta; E. Rabasa (eds.). Actas del Segundo Congreso Nacional de Historia de la Construcción: A Coruña, 22–24 de octubre de 1998. Madrid: I. Juan de Herrera. Archived from the original (PDF) on 2017-02-02.
- López Ferreiro, Antonio (1901). Historia de la Santa A.M. Iglesia de Santiago de Compostela (in Spanish). Vol. IV. Santiago de Compostela: Imp. y Enc. del Seminario Conciliar Central. OCLC 932806777.
- López Morán, Enriqueta (2004). "El Monacato Femenino Gallego en la Alta Edad Media (La Coruña y Pontevedra)" (PDF). Nalgures (in Spanish). I. A Coruña: Asociación Cultural de Estudios Históricos de Galicia: 119–174. ISSN 1885-6349. Archived from the original (PDF) on 2012-02-17.
- López-Sangil, José Luis (2002). La nobleza altomedieval gallega, la familia Froílaz-Traba (in Spanish). La Coruña: Toxosoutos, S.L. ISBN 84-95622-68-8.
- Mattoso, José (2014). D. Afonso Henriques (in Portuguese). Lisbon: Temas e Debates. ISBN 978-972-759-911-0.
- Pallares, María del Carmen; Portela, Ermelindo (1993). "Aristocracias y sistema de parentesco en la Galicia de los siglos centrales de la Edad Media: el grupo de los Traba". Hispania. Revista Española de Historia (in Spanish). 53 (185). Madrid: Consejo Superior de Investigaciones Científicas (CSIC): 823–840. ISSN 0018-2141.
- Reilly, Bernard F. (1998). The Kingdom of León-Castilla Under King Alfonso VII, 1126–1157. Philadelphia: University of Pennsylvania Press.
- Sánchez de Mora, Antonio (2003). La nobleza castellana en la plena Edad Media: el linaje de Lara. Tesis doctoral. Universidad de Sevilla (in Spanish). Vol. I.
- Torres Sevilla-Quiñones de León, Margarita Cecilia (1998). "Relaciones Fronterizas entre Portugal y León en tiempos de Alfonso VII: El ejemplo de la Casa de Traba" (PDF). Revista da Faculdade de Letras: História. Universidade do Porto (in Spanish). 15 (2). Porto: 301–12. ISSN 0871-164X.
- Torres Sevilla-Quiñones de León, Margarita Cecilia (1999). Linajes nobiliarios de León y Castilla: Siglos IX-XIII. Salamanca: Junta de Castilla y León, Consejería de educación y cultura. ISBN 84-7846-781-5.

=== Primary sources ===
- Fernández de Viana y Vieites, José Ignacio; González Balasch, Mª Teresa; de Pablos Ramírez, Juan Carlos (1996). "El Tumbo de Caaveiro" (PDF). Cátedra. Revista de Estudios Eumeses (in Spanish) (3): 267–437. ISSN 1133-9608. Archived from the original (PDF) on 2016-03-11.
