= Monterroso =

Coordinates: 42°47′33″N 7°50′10″W

- Municipality
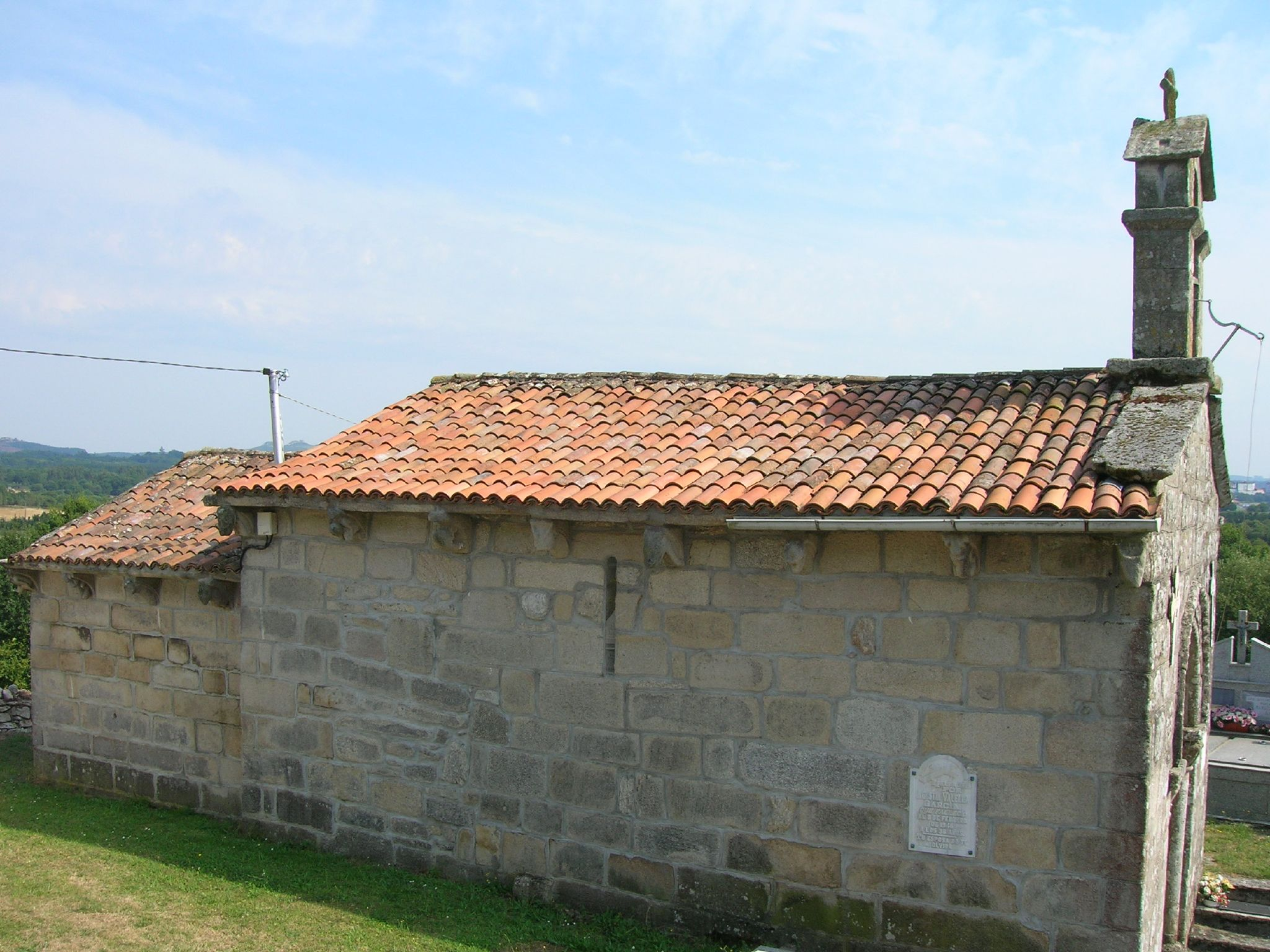
- Church of San Martiño de Cumbraos.

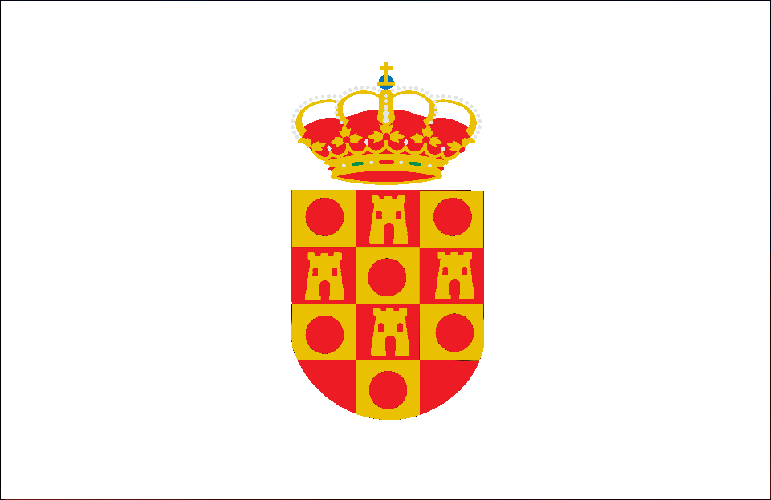
- Flag Coat of arms

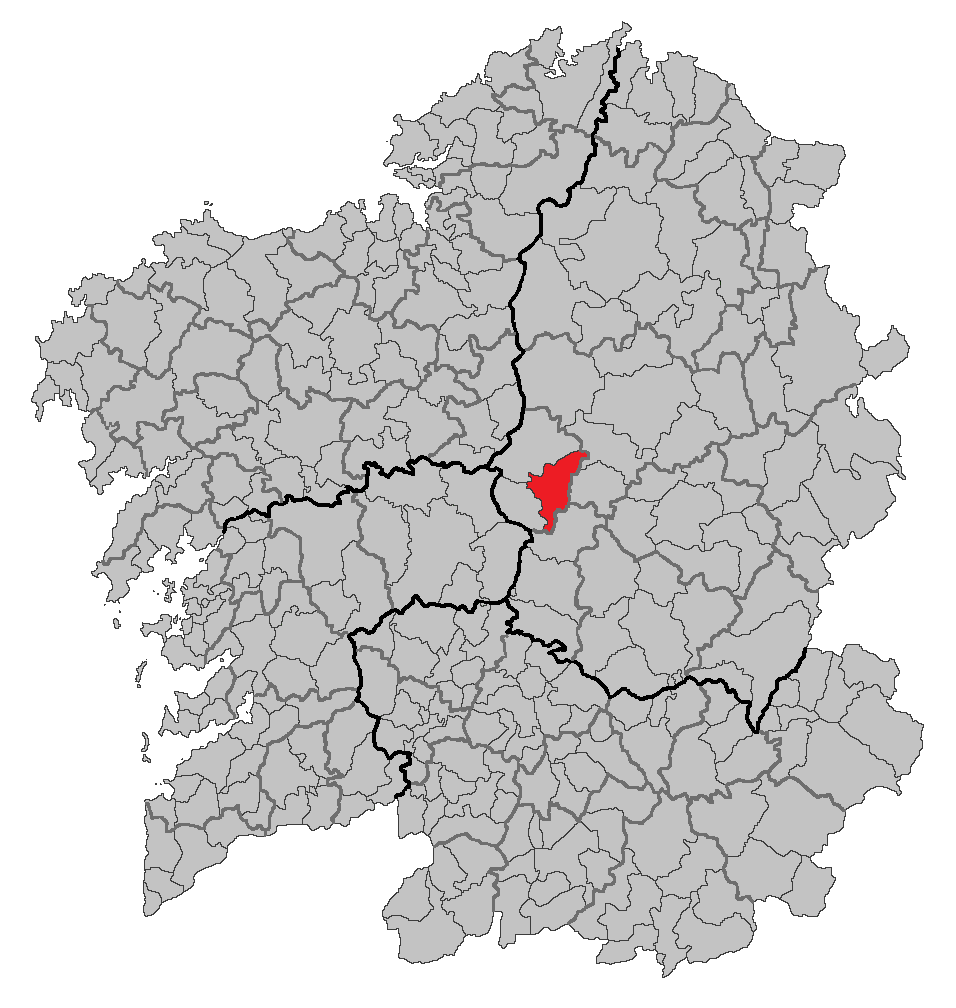
- Location of Monterroso

- Location in Spain
- Country: Spain
- Autonomous community: Galicia
- Province: Lugo
- Comarca: A Ulloa

Government
  - Alcalde: Rocío Seijas Vázquez (IxM)
- Demonym(s): Monterrosino, -a
- Time zone: UTC+1 (CET)
  - Summer (DST): UTC+2 (CEST)
- Postal code: 27560
- Website: Official website

Monterroso is a municipality in the province of Lugo, in the autonomous community of Galicia, Spain. It belongs to the comarca of A Ulloa.

== History ==
Monterroso was the seat of an important tenencia in medieval Galicia. Among its known tenants were:

- Suero Vermúdez (c.1100)
- Gutierre Vermúdez (1112)
- Munio Peláez (1112–16)
- Fernando Pérez de Traba (1140–53)
- Gonzalo Fernández de Traba (1157–60), son of the former
- Fernando González de Traba (1160–63)
- Rodrigo Álvarez (1168)
- Gómez González de Traba (1170–73), first time
- Gómez González de Manzanedo (1173)
- Gómez González de Traba (1189–1200), second time
