= Rodrigo Vélaz =

Count of Galicia

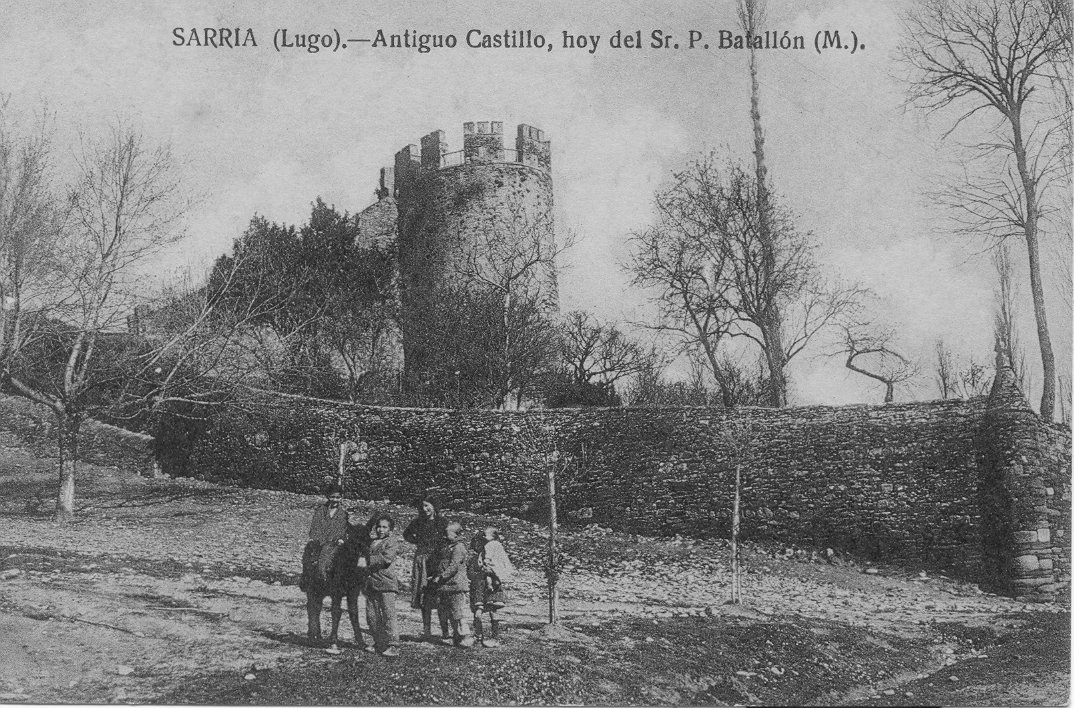
The Torre del Batallón at Sarria, the remains of Rodrigo's stronghold.

Rodrigo Vélaz (died June 1144) was the dominant figure in mountainous eastern Galicia while the House of Traba dominated its western seaboard under three monarchs—Alfonso VI, Urraca, and Alfonso VII. He was notably loyal to the monarchy, never joining any rebellion. The near-contemporary Chronica Adefonsi imperatoris calls him the "count of Galicia, who held Sarria".

He was a son of Count Vela Ovéquiz and Aldonza Muñoz, daughter of Count Muño Fernández and Elvira. Rodrigo married Urraca Álvarez, daughter of Álvar Fáñez and Mayor Pérez, a daughter of Pedro Ansúrez. Rodrigo and his wife were descended on all sides from the highest ranks of the nobility of León and Castile. The couple had three daughters—Aldonza, Berenguela, and Elvira—and one son, Álvaro Rodríguez, who was later a count like his father. On 6 August 1130 Rodrigo and Urraca made a donation to the Cathedral of Lugo, their first recorded act as husband and wife.

== Tenencias ==
. The contemporary Historia compostellana is a valuable source for his life, since there are no aristocratic archives surviving in Spain from this period. Rodrigo's career must be pieced together from the few references in the chronicles and the (copies of) charters preserved in various ecclesiastical archives.

Rodrigo first appears as witness to a charter of 31 July 1092, in which his mother donated the monastery of San Pedro de Teverga to the cathedral of Oviedo. By late May 1112, he had received the rank of count. Shortly before, that same month, he had received the tenencia, that is, a fief of the crown governed but not owned by the holder, of Sarria. By 1 April 1115 he had also been invested with the tenencia of Monteforte de Lemos, and on 12 September 1118 he was cited as holding Caldelas (although this is the only reference to this tenencia in his hands). The region of Lemos and Sarria was usually governed by a count. It was bounded to the west by the river Minho and to the south by the Sil. In 1120 a certain Pelayo Garciaz is recorded as merino serving both the queen and Rodrigo in Sarria. By 7 September 1127 Rodrigo had also received the rule of Rábade. The last record of his rule there dates from April 1142, although he continued to govern Sarria and Lemos until late September 1143. Royal documents usually refer to him as de or in Sarria (of or in Sarria), while private documents cite him as tenans or tenente (tenant, holder). There is a sole private document from 1137 that refers to Rodrigo's rule in Larín. There is no record of Rodrigo after 5 October 1143 and he had perhaps become too ill or too weak to take a part in public affairs. He was by that time quite old. His death is mentioned in a document of 22 June 1144 as having happened at that time.

== Relationship with the Crown ==
In July 1114 Urraca went to Santiago de Compostela in an attempt to remove the bishop Diego Gelmírez from power legally. Failing this she attempted to have him captured, which plan was spoiled by Pedro Fróilaz de Traba. She then opened negotiations with Diego, resulting in her swearing an oath to respect his person and his honor (the secular territory under the bishop's government). A similar oath was extracted from the other Galician magnates, including Pedro Fróilaz and Rodrigo Vélaz. Rodrigo's loyalty to Urraca during the conflict-riddled part of her reign is demonstrated by the fact that he confirmed sixteen royal charters between 1112 and 1120, by far the most by any Galician magnate.

Rodrigo recognised the accession of Alfonso VII at Zamora, with the other magnates of Galicia, after the new king had taken the capital city of León. On 18 July 1126 Alfonso VII granted land at a place called Seixon to Pedro Ovéquiz and his wife María Fernández through the intervention of Rodrigo. It is a good indicator of his influence at court.

== Military activities ==
In the autumn of 1137, Rodrigo was one of only two Galician nobles to join the royal army then marching on Navarre. The other was Fernando Pérez de Traba, who had joined the army by early October at Logroño. Rodrigo arrived later that month, only after the army had reached the Ebro river. In 1139 Rodrigo participated in the Siege of Oreja. In 1140 Rodrigo allied himself with Fernando Pérez de Traba, then the lover of Theresa, Countess of Portugal, which he de facto ruled as her consort. The two were defeated in battle near Cernesa, an unidentified location, by the forces of Theresa's son and heir, Afonso Henriques, who had grown uncomfortable with his mother's power-sharing, and had invaded Galicia, camping near Limia. The anonymous author of the Chronica Adefonsi imperatoris, perhaps Arnaldo of Astorga, attributes the counts' defeat to their sins. Rodrigo was captured during the flight, but two of his armourbearers freed him by "some clever stratagem" and he managed to join the rest of the army in taking refuge in Galicia. The Chronica notes that "prior to this, the Portuguese monarch had come to Galicia several times, but always he had been driven back by Fernando Pérez and Rodrigo Vélaz and other Galician leaders. Often he was forced to return to Portugal dishonored."

An anonymous poet, writing shortly after the conquest of Almería in 1147, admits the military prestige of Rodrigo, but that of his father-in-law was greater:

Herein arrives Álvaro, the son of the powerful Rodrigo. It is he who brought death to many and governed Toledo. The father is honored through the son, and the son is exalted by his own actions. Strong indeed was Rodrigo, and he is not undeserving of the glory of his son. The latter was famed through his father, but is even more distinguished through his grandfather Alvaro. It is he who is known by all and not least by his enemies.

— Arnaldo of Astorga?, Poema de Almería, vv. 204–209

== Relationship with the Church ==
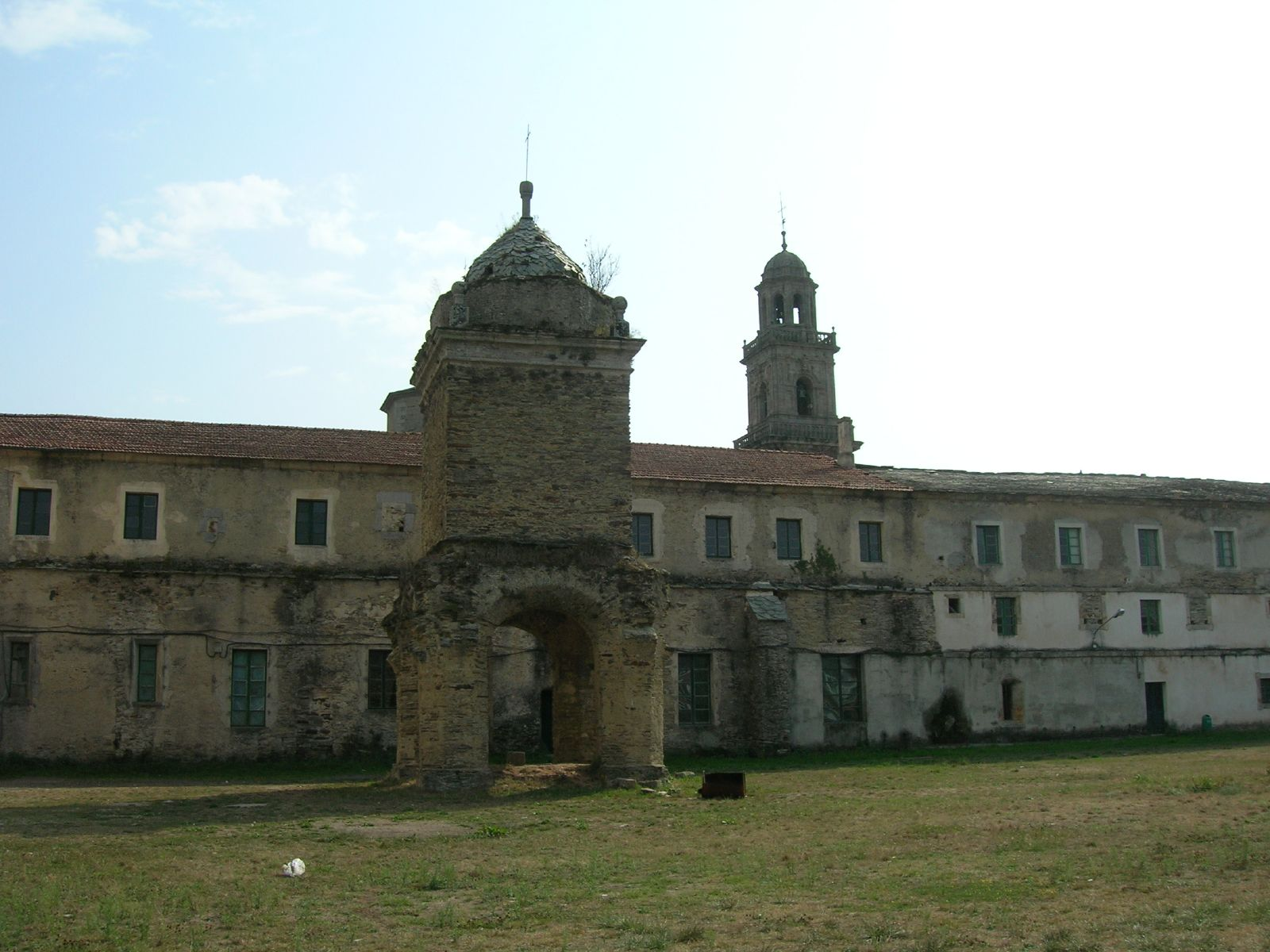
The former monastery of San Salvador de Lourenzá, the rare case of a church with which Rodrigo had good relations.

On 27 May 1112 Queen Urraca donated some estates that had been illegally usurped by a certain Ermesinda Núñez and granted to the Diocese of Mondoñedo to Rodrigo and to the Benedictine monastery of Lorenzana. Then, on 13 June, Rodrigo made a further donation to Lorenzana. His father had lost a case brought before the king against the Diocese of Lugo in 1078 and Rodrigo appears to have harboured some ill will towards the see. In 1113 he is said to have "harassed" the church of Lugo over jurisdictions. According to the Historia compostellana, Rodrigo visited the Kingdom of Jerusalem around 1121. He later had a dispute with the bishop of Mondoñedo, Nuño Alfonso, concerning their respective jurisdictions. It was solved by an accord of 20 June 1128. Resolution seems to have been forced on them by Alfonso VII when he was holding court at Palencia.

== Bibliography ==
- S. Barton. 1997. The Aristocracy in Twelfth-century León and Castile. Cambridge: Cambridge University Press.
- S. Barton. 2000. "From Tyrants to Soldiers of Christ: The Nobility of Twelfth-century León-Castile and the Struggle Against Islam". Nottingham Medieval Studies, 44, 28–48.
- S. Barton. 2006. "The 'Discovery of Aristocracy' in Twelfth-Century Spain: Portraits of the Secular Élite in the Poem of Almería". Bulletin of Hispanic Studies, 83, 453–68.
- J. M. Canal Sánchez-Pagín. 1986. "El conde leonés Fruela Díaz y su esposa la navarra doña Estefanía Sánchez (siglos XI–XII)", Príncipe de Viana, 47:177, 23–42.
- R. A. Fletcher. 1978. The Episcopate in the Kingdom of León in the Twelfth Century. Oxford: Oxford University Press.
- R. A. Fletcher. 1984. Saint James's Catapult: The Life and Times of Diego Gelmírez of Santiago de Compostela. Oxford: Oxford University Press.
- G. E. Lipskey. 1972. The Chronicle of Alfonso the Emperor: A Translation of the Chronica Adefonsi imperatoris. PhD thesis, Northwestern University. [Cited as CAI.]
- E. Pardo de Guevara y Valdés. Los señores de Galicia: Tenentes y condes de Lemos en la Edad Media, 2 vols. A Coruña: 2000.
- B. F. Reilly. 1982. The Kingdom of León-Castilla under Queen Urraca, 1109–1126. Princeton: Princeton University Press.
- B. F. Reilly. 1988. The Kingdom of León-Castilla under King Alfonso VI, 1065–1109. Princeton: Princeton University Press.
- B. F. Reilly. 1998. The Kingdom of León-Castilla under King Alfonso VII, 1126–1157. Philadelphia: University of Pennsylvania Press.
