= Froila Vermúdez de Traba =

11th century Galician nobleman

Froila Vermúdez was a Galician nobleman born in the 11th century. He is the first known member of the House of Traba. This family was originally from the Costa da Morte. He was an important count in the north and north-west of Galicia. He died in Cospeito in 1091, and was buried in the monastery of Xuvia, with which he had maintained a close relationship. He left three daughters and three sons, of whom Pedro Fróilaz was his political heir. The family properties covered much of the territory north of river Tambre.

== Bibliography ==
- López Morán, Enriqueta (2004). "El Monacato Femenino Gallego en la Alta Edad Media (La Coruña y Pontevedra)" (PDF). Revista Nalgures (in Spanish). I. A Coruña: Asociación Cultural de Estudios Históricos de Galicia: 119–174. ISSN 1885-6349.
- López-Sangil, José Luis (2002). La nobleza altomedieval gallega, la familia Fróilaz-Traba (in Spanish). La Coruña: Toxosoutos, S.L. ISBN 84-95622-68-8.
- López-Sangil, José Luis (2007). "La nobleza altomedieval gallega, la familia Fróilaz-Traba. Sus fundaciones monacales en Galicia" (PDF). Revista Nalgures (in Spanish). IV. A Coruña: Asociación Cultural de Estudios Históricos de Galicia: 241–331. ISSN 1885-6349.
