= County of Trastámara =

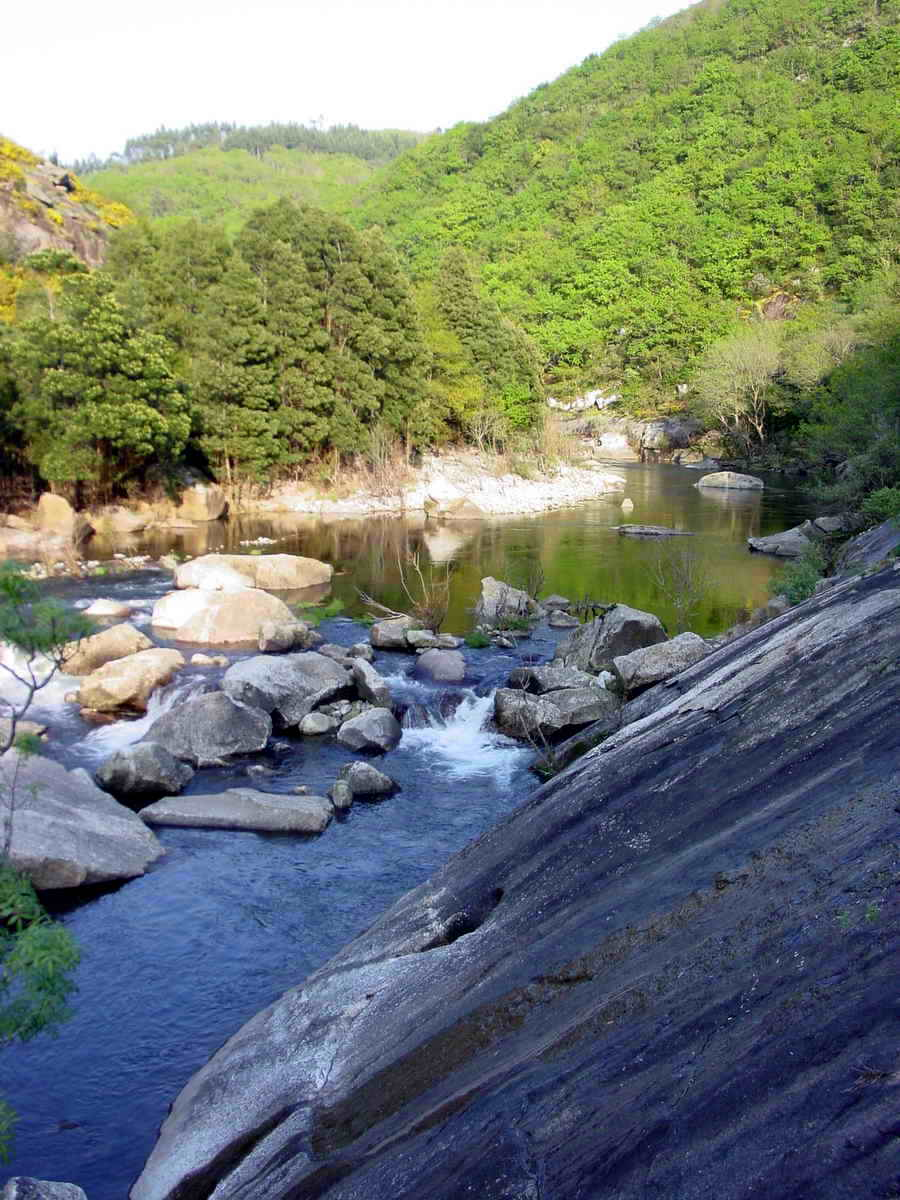
The river Tambre, southern boundary of the Trastámara

The County of Trastámara (Spanish Condado de Trastámara) was a tenancy of the crown in the Kingdom of Galicia in the Middle Ages. Its name comes from the Latin tra(n)s Tamar(is), meaning "beyond [north of] the Tambre", a river which runs through Galicia. It was regularly granted to men of a single family, the House of Traba from the 11th century into the 13th, after which it was often given for life to others, including Alvar Núñez Osorio and the future King Henry II of Castile, whose dynasty is thus known as the House of Trastámara. On 4 February 1445 in San Martín de Valdeiglesias, it was granted as a hereditary possession to Pedro Álvarez Osorio by Juan II of Castile.

== Counts ==
=== House of Traba ===
- Froila Bermúdez de Traba (died 1091)
- Pedro Fróilaz de Traba (r. 11251126, d. 1128), son of prec.
- Fernando Pérez de Traba (r. 1132–1145, d. 1155), son of prec.
- Gonzalo Fernández de Traba (r. 1155–1159, d. 1165), son of Fernando Pérez
- Fernando González de Traba (r. 1161–1165, d. 1165), son of prec.
- Bermudo Pérez de Traba (died 1168), son of Pedro Fróilaz
- Gómez González de Traba (r. 1165–1208, d. c. 1211), son of Gonzalo Fernández
- Rodrigo Gómez de Traba (r. c.1220–c.1260, d. c. 1261), son of prec.

=== House of Osorio ===
- Pedro Álvarez Osorio, I Count of Trastámara;
- Álvaro Pérez Osorio, II Count of Trastámara (I Marquess of Astorga);
- Pedro Álvarez Osorio, III Count of Trastámara;
- Álvaro Pérez Osorio, IV Count of Trastámara;
- Pedro Álvarez Osorio, V Count of Trastámara;
- Álvar Pérez Osorio] VI Count of Trastámara;
- Antonio Pedro Álvarez Osorio, VII Count of Trastámara;
- Alfonso Pérez Osorio Velasco y Herrera, VIII Count of Trastámara;
- Pedro Álvarez Osorio, IX Count of Trastámara;
- Álvar Pérez Osorio, X Count of Trastámara;
- Antonio Pedro Sancho Dávila y Osorio, XI Count of Trastámara;
- Ana Dávila y Osorio, XII Countessa of Trastámara;
- Melchor de Guzmán y Osorio, XIII Count of Trastámara;
- Ana de Guzmán Osorio y Dávila, XIV Countessa of Trastámara;
- Ventura Osorio de Moscoso y Guzmán Dávila y Aragón, XV Count of Trastámara;
- Vicente Joaquín Osorio de Moscoso y Guzmán, XVI Count of Trastámara;
- Vicente Isabel Osorio de Moscoso y Álvarez de Toledo, XVII Count of Trastámara;
- Vicente Pío Osorio de Moscoso y Ponce de León, XVIII Count of Trastámara;
- José María Osorio de Moscoso y Carvajal, XIX Count of Trastámara;
- Francisco de Asís Osorio de Moscoso y de Borbón, XX Count of Trastámara;
- Francisco de Asís Osorio de Moscoso y Jordán de Urríes, XXI Count of Trastámara;
- María del Perpetuo Socorro Osorio de Moscoso y Reynoso, XXII Countess of Trastámara;

=== House of Barón ===
- Gonzalo Barón y Gavito, XXIII Count of Trastámara;
- María del Pilar Paloma de Casanova-Cárdenas y Barón, XXIV Countess of Trastámara;
- María de la Blanca Barón y Osorio de Moscoso, XXV Countess of Trastámara;

=== House of Castellano ===
- Rafael Castellano y Barón, XXVI Count of Trastámara;
- Jaime Castellano y de la Chica, XXVII Count of Trastámara;
