= Gómez González de Manzanedo =

Castilian magnate (died 1182)

Gómez González de Manzanedo (died 12 October 1182) was a Castilian magnate who governed Calahorra and defended the border with Navarre in the 1150s and 1160s. He spent three periods in the neighbouring Kingdom of León.

Gómez's parentage is unknown, other than that his patronymic indicates his father was named Gonzalo. The longstanding reconstruction making him son of Gonzalo Ruiz of La Bureba is unlikely on chronological grounds (Gonzalo outlived him by twenty-three years). He may have been the son of Gonzalo Gómez, uncle of Gonzalo Ruiz and son of count Gómez González de Candespina. Sometime before May 1162 Gómez married Amilia (Milia/Melia) Pérez, daughter of Pedro González de Lara and Eva. His wife was still living in May 1182, months before his own death. Their children were Diego, Elvira, Gil, Gonzalo, Inés, Juan, Manrique, and Jimena, who married Pedro Fernández de Castro.

Gómez is first mentioned in a document of 9 November 1148, during the reign of Alfonso VII. In 1155 he was given the tenencia of Paredes to govern. Between June 1155 and August 1156 he served Sancho III, then ruling part of Castile from Nájera, as alférez, a post typically reserved for younger noblemen. He was promoted to the office of mayordomo mayor del rey (majordomo) by March 1157. After the death of Alfonso VII in August 1157, Sancho, then ruling all of Castile, appointed Gómez to govern the Liébana in northwestern Castile, which he did until 1170. In March 1158 he was appointed to govern Calahorra, an important city in eastern Castile, which he held as late as 1171. In July 1158 he lost the post of majordomo and was appointed alférez again. That fall he defended Calahorra from the incursions of Sancho VI of Navarre.

There is some confusion regarding Gómez's whereabouts after Sancho's death on 31 August 1158. He held the tenencia of Pernía in Castile between 1162 and 1164. After that a certain Gómez González, called castellanus ("the Castilian"), entered the service of Ferdinand II of León, whom he served as majordomo from October 1164 to July 1165. This is probably the Gómez who had served Sancho in the same capacity, but there was another Gómez González who regularly attended the court of Alfonso VIII of Castile during this same year.

By October 1165 Gómez had returned to Castile, where he was granted the tenencias of Baró and Cereceda, the latter which he retained until 1169. In 1168 he was granted the tenencias of Abba Alua (unidentified), Villafranca, and Campo (held into 1172). That year he made a donation to the Knights Hospitaller. By 28 December 1169 Gómez had attained the rank of count, the highest in the kingdom of Castile. In 1172 he was governing the Asturias de Santillana, the eastern half of the Asturias, allocated to Castile by Alfonso VII, as well as Cervera, Mudá, and Piedras Negras. In April 1173 the former majordomo of Sancho was appointed majordomo by Alfonso, but at the time he appears to have been in Galicia, where between March and November that year he was governing Monforte de Lemos and Monterroso. He appears to have returned to León in August 1180 and remained there until March 1181. He is last mentioned in a Castilian document of 9 September 1181, over a year before his reported death. A charter from 1184 claims to record a donation of Gómez to San Salvador de Oña.
