= Cantiga de seguir =

The cantiga de seguir (lit. 'song of following') is the genre of parody (imitation) in the Galician-Portuguese lyric. In the 14th-century Arte de trovar, three degrees of 'following' are identified: borrowing of a melody alone, including its metre (i.e.e, contrafactum); borrowing of a rhyme scheme on top of the melody; and borrowing of the sense, as in paraphrase of whole lines. In the third degree, the melody is also borrowed but not necessarily the rhymes. The most difficult and lauded form of cantiga de seguir was that of the third degree wherein a whole refrain is borrowed but its meaning is changed by context. Am example of the last and highest type of cantiga de seguir is Gonçal'Eanes do Vinhal's U' dona foi, de pran, which imitates Afonso Mendes de Besteiros's Ja lhi nuna pedirán.
