= Trasancos =

Former county in Galicia, Spain

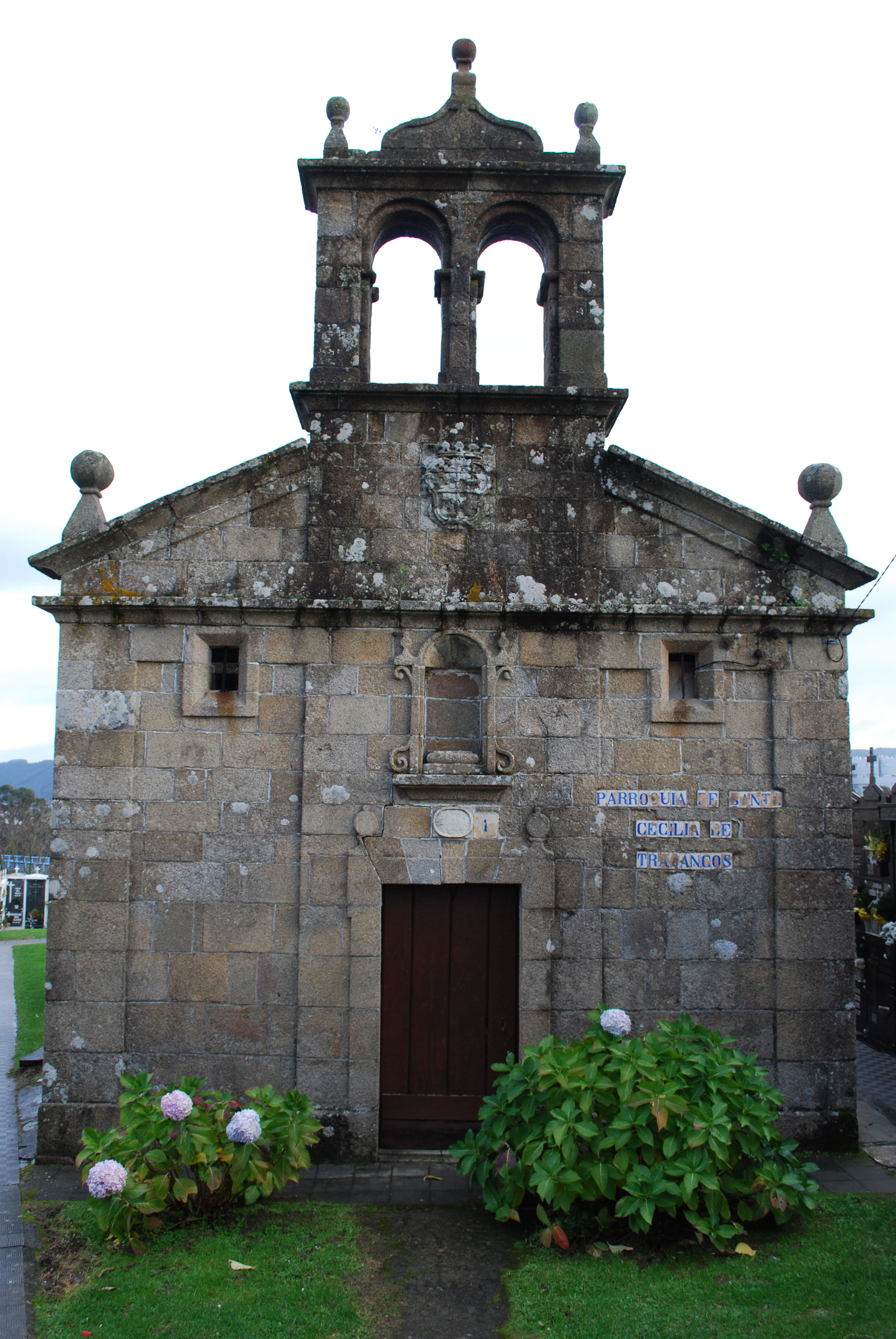

Trasancos or Trasanquos was the name of a historic Galician county in northern Galicia. The Transanqui was a Gallaeci people in Pre-Roman and Roman times, and it is documented as county since the 6th century in the Suebic Kingdom of Galicia until the 20th century.
