= Álvaro Rodríguez (nobleman) =

Galician magnate

Álvaro Rodríguez (fl. 1129–1166, died January 1167) was a Galician magnate during the reigns of Alfonso VII and Ferdinand II.

Álvaro was the son of Rodrigo Vélaz and Urraca Álvarez, perhaps a daughter of Álvar Fáñez and Mayor Pérez, daughter of Pedro Ansúrez. He married Sancha, an illegitimate daughter of Fernando Pérez de Traba and Theresa, Countess of Portugal. The earliest indication that the couple was married dates to 25 May 1150. After she was widowed, Sancha re-married to Pedro Alfonso. She died around 1182, having left Álvaro two sons, Rodrigo and Vermudo, and two daughters, Sancha and Teresa, who married Alfonso Ramírez.

Álvaro is first mentioned in a document of 29 January 1129 in the Tumbo de Lorenzana, the cartulary of the monastery of Lourenzá. In 1147 he participated in the reconquista of Almería, according to the celebratory Poema de Almería, and brought along a retinue of young men who had received their education in arms under his direction. The anonymous Poema extols Álvaro's ancestry, especially his maternal grandfather and namesake:

[Álvaro] brought death to many and governed Toledo. The father is honoured through the son, and the son is exalted by his own actions. Strong indeed was Rodrigo, and he is not undeserving of the glory of his son. The latter was famed through his father, but is even more distinguished through his grandfather Álvaro. It is he who is known by all and not least by his enemies. . . Having descended from such a noble family, behold Álvaro. He enrages the Moors with his virtue because he hates them.

On 13 February 1161 Álvaro was carrying the title "count" (Latin comes), the highest in the kingdom, for the first time. He held the tenencias of Ribadeo (1146), Suarón (1153), Montenegro (1155), Sarria (1164–66), and Limia (1165). He patronised the Cistercian monastery of Meira, where nearby he had received a grant of property from Alfonso VII on 27 August 1151. In 1164 Álvaro came to an agreement with Peter, Bishop of Mondoñedo, whereby the Galician churches of Pineira, Vigo, and Villasella, which belonged to the diocese, were handed over to Álvaro in exchange for some properties.

Álvaro was dead by 20 January 1167. His son Rodrigo succeeded him at Sarria and Lemos and was granted the title of "count".
