= Montenegro, Granada =

Historic farmhouse in Alpujarra de la Sierra, Andalusia, Spain

Ermita de la Virgen de Fátima in Montenegro, Granada, Spain. Built in 1953.

Montenegro is a cortijada or hamlet part of the municipality of Alpujarra de la Sierra, province of Granada, Andalusia, Spain. It currently has 5 adult inhabitants.

It is located on the GR 7 trading route, which is now a long-distance footpath, that runs from Algeciras to Greece.

It was once owned by Aben Aboo, the last Moorish King in Spain successor to Aben Humeya. His possessions were redistributed to the Christian families of Blanco, Medina, Romera, Ruiz and Vela who were from other parts of Spain in 1652.
