= Monfero Abbey =

Monastery in Monfero, Spain

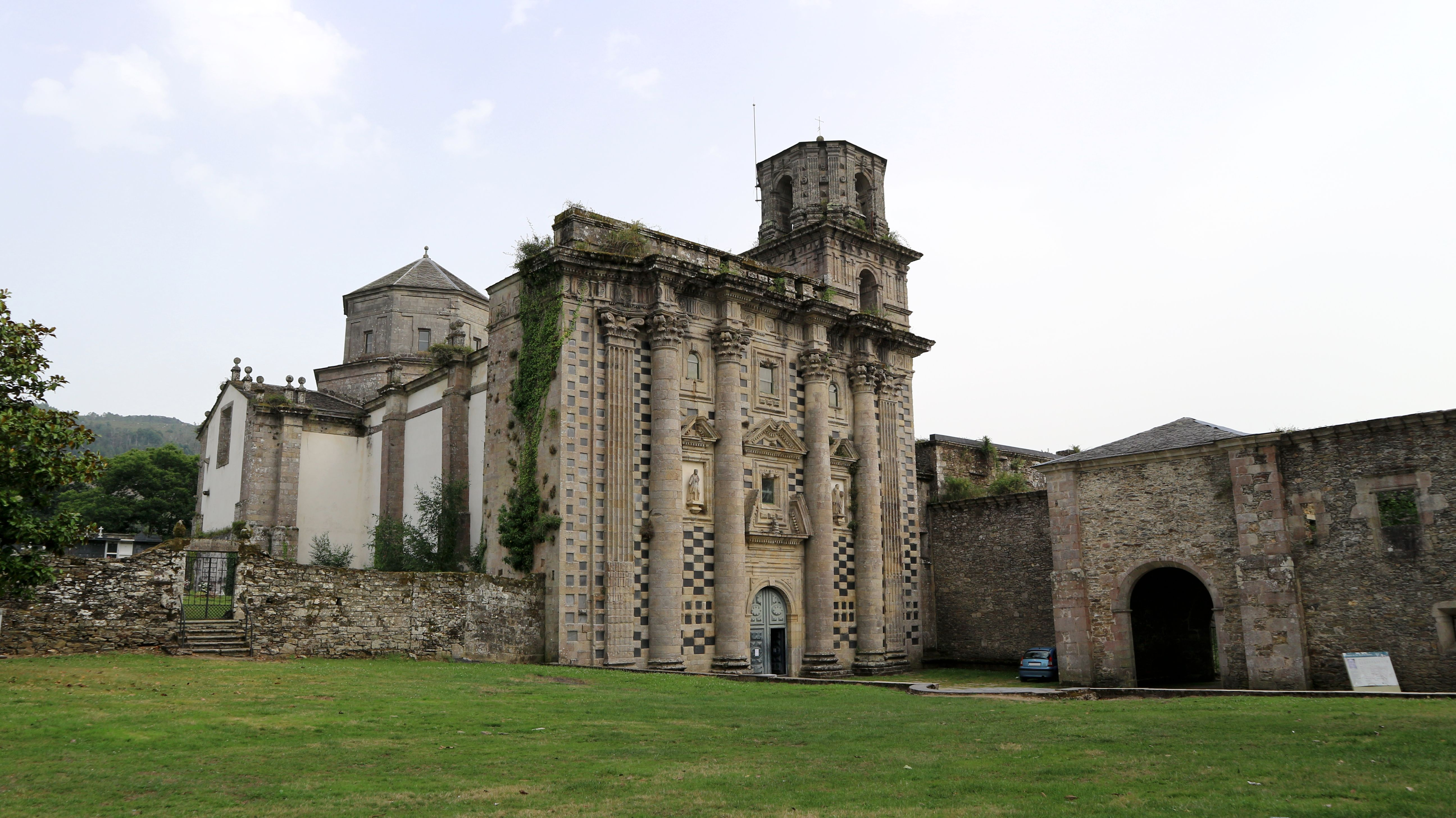
- Abbey of Monfero

- Location within Spain
- Interactive map of Monfero Abbey

Monastery information
- Order: Cistercian
- Established: 1114

People
- Founder: Afonso VII the Emperor

Site
- Location: Monfero, Galicia (Spain)
- Coordinates: 43.3403°N 8.03333°W
- Visible remains: substantial
- Public access: yes

Monfero Abbey (Galician: Mosteiro de San Fiz de Monfero; Spanish: Monasterio de Santa María de Monfero) is a former Cistercian monastery dedicated to Mary, Mother of Jesus, in the province of A Coruña in Galicia, Spain. It is located in Monfero in Ferrolterra in the comarca of Eume, about 22 km to the north-east of Betanzos.

== History ==
In the 10th century on the site of an earlier hermitage a Benedictine monastery was founded, dedicated to Saint Mark, and supported by king Bermudo II. It was destroyed by Norman raids, but later reconstructed under Alfonso VII in 1134 in collaboration with several nobles, including Alfonso Bermúdez, Count Pedro Osório and the Counts of Traba, who endowed it.

The abbey joined the Cistercian order in 1147 as a daughter house of Sobrado Abbey, of the filiation of Clairvaux.

In the 16th century Monfero became part of the Castilian Cistercian Congregation.

In the 17th century the Romanesque monastery was struck by lightning and destroyed. It was rebuilt between 1620 and 1658 in the Baroque style. In 1805 the church was again struck by lightning and damaged.

The dissolution of the monasteries carried out by the government of Mendizábal brought the abbey to an end in 1835.

== Buildings ==
The present building complex, a landmark of Monfero, is essentially that of the 17th century, constructed mostly of granite and slate on a site of outstanding natural beauty]. The church, which continues in operation, is built on the plan of a Latin cross with a single nave and two side aisles, and has a distinctive and well-known Baroque west front with four enormous half-pillars and two half-pilasters with a chequered design of inlaid tiles. The Baroque main altar was made in 1666. The church contains four Gothic tombs of the de Andrade family. The former conventual buildings lie to the south of the church. Of the three cloisters that were once here, only a fragment remains of the Romanesque one.

== Gallery ==
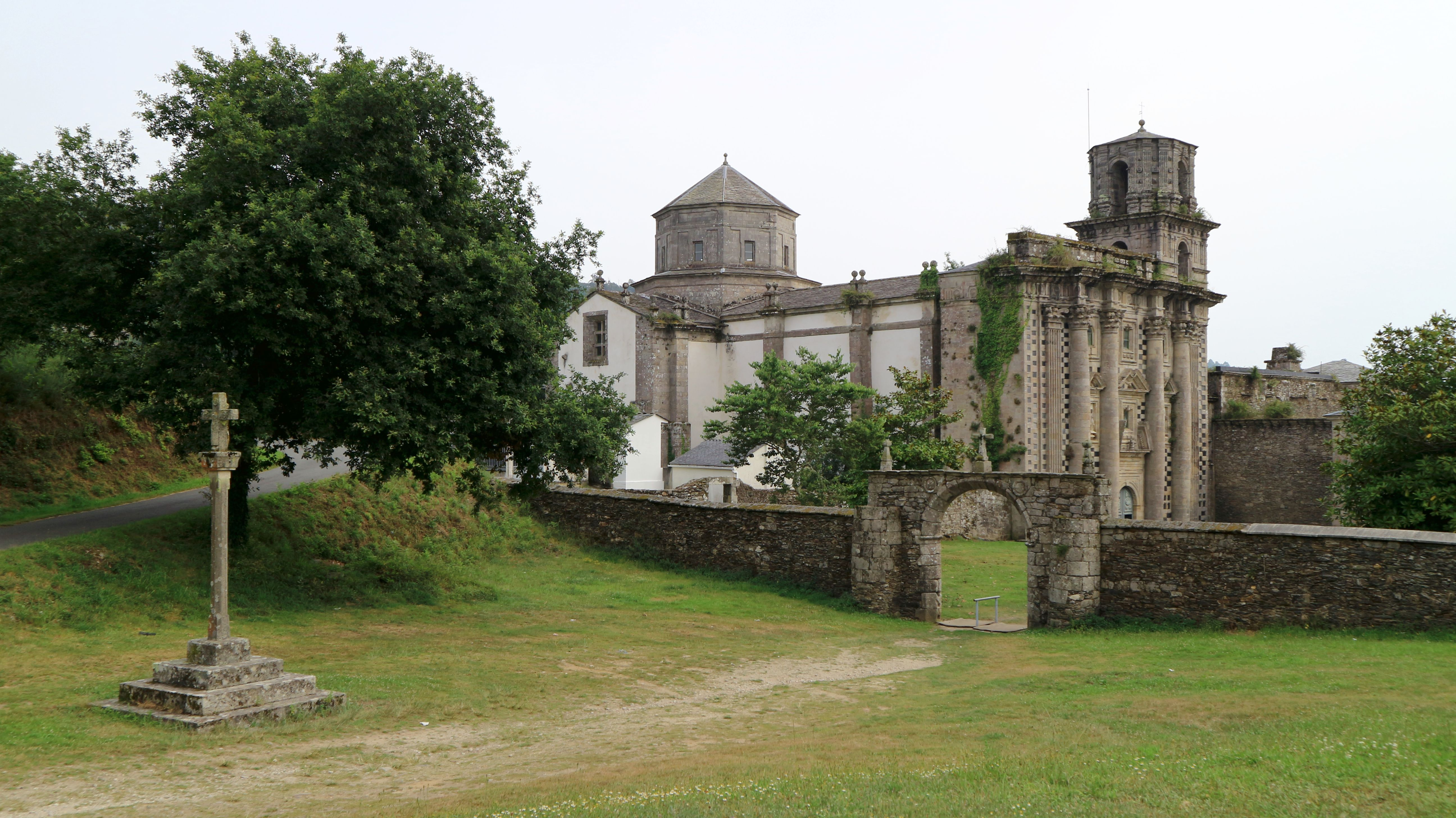
Calvary in front of the abbey

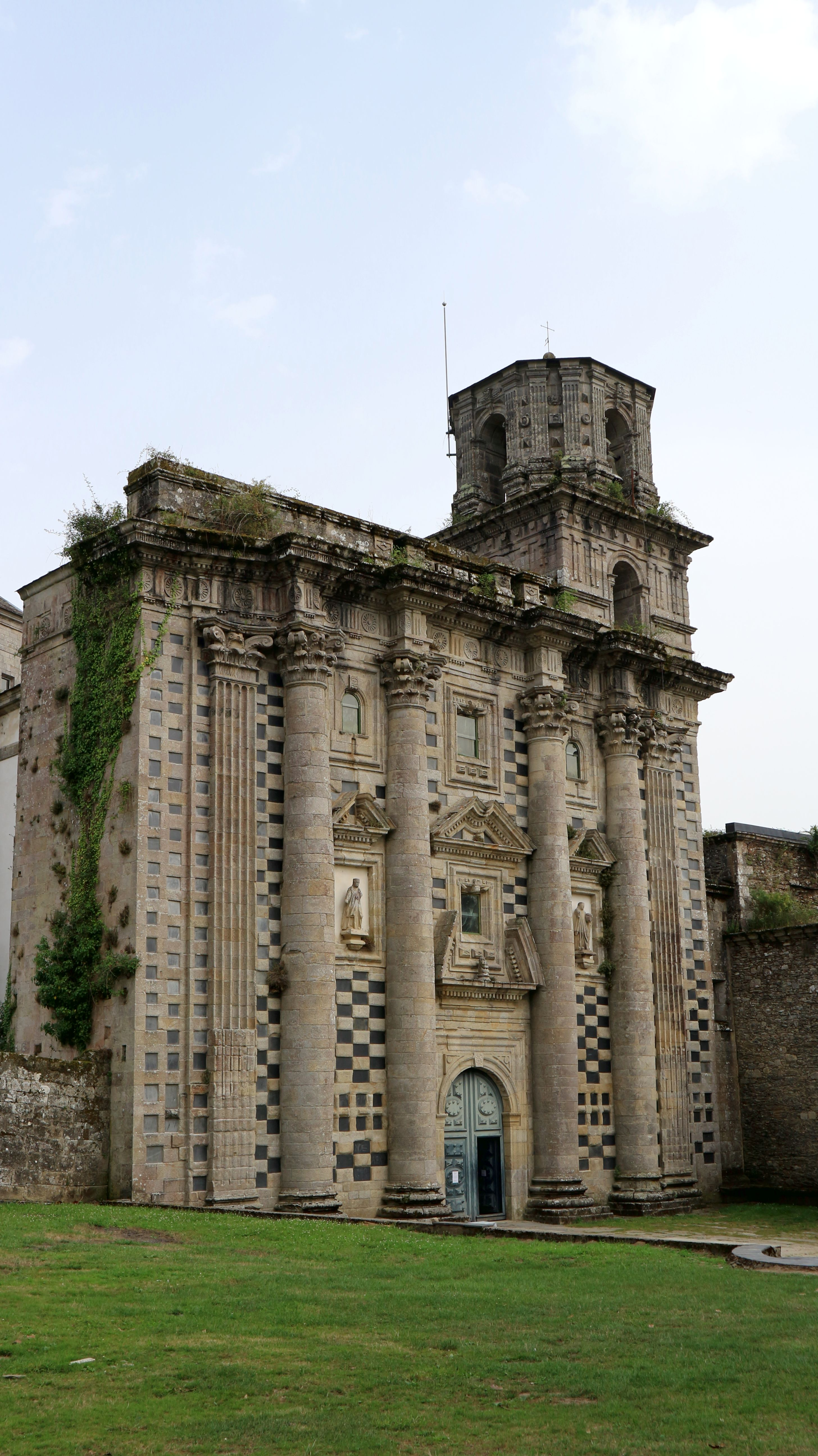
Church front view

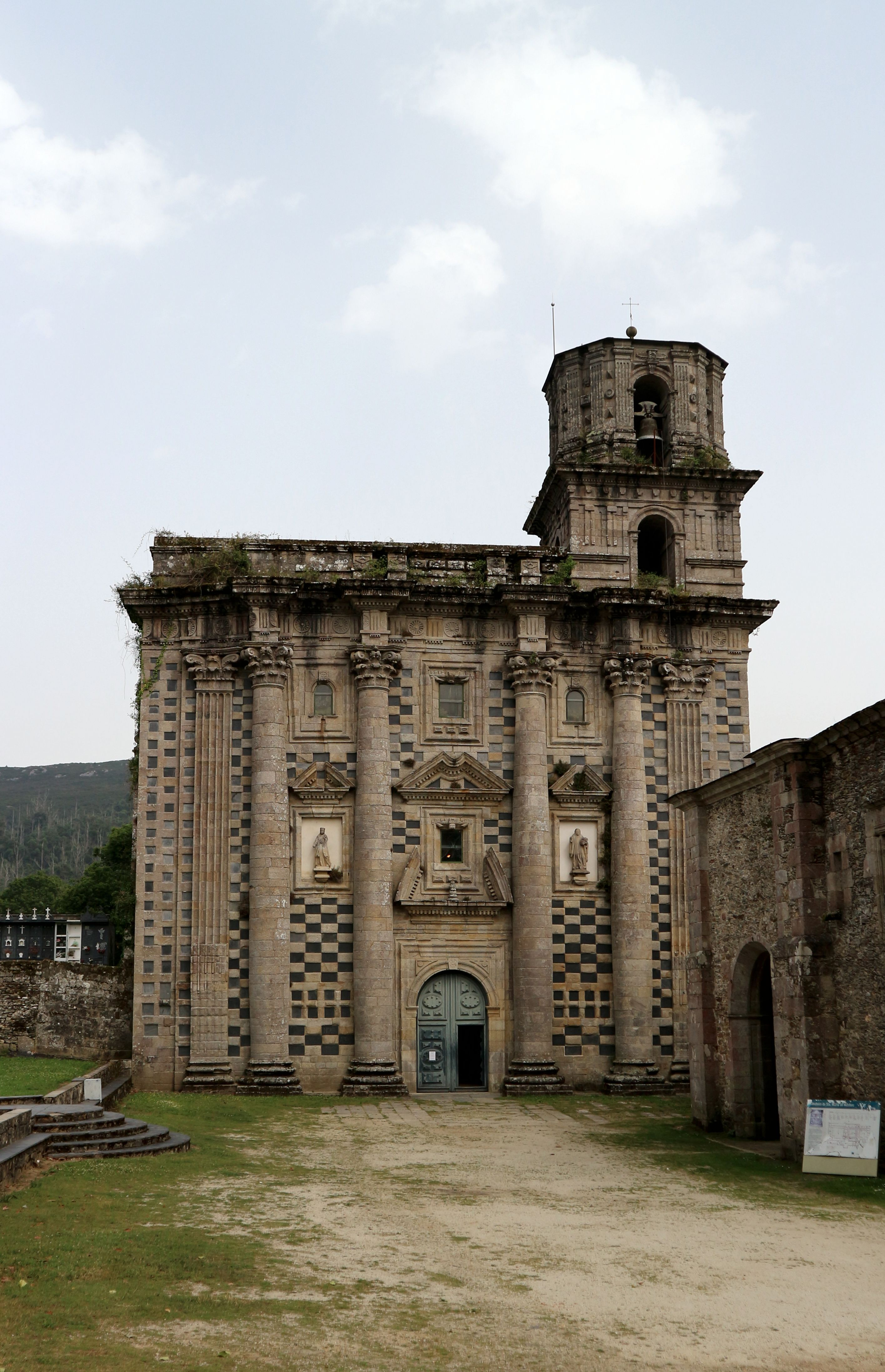
Church front view

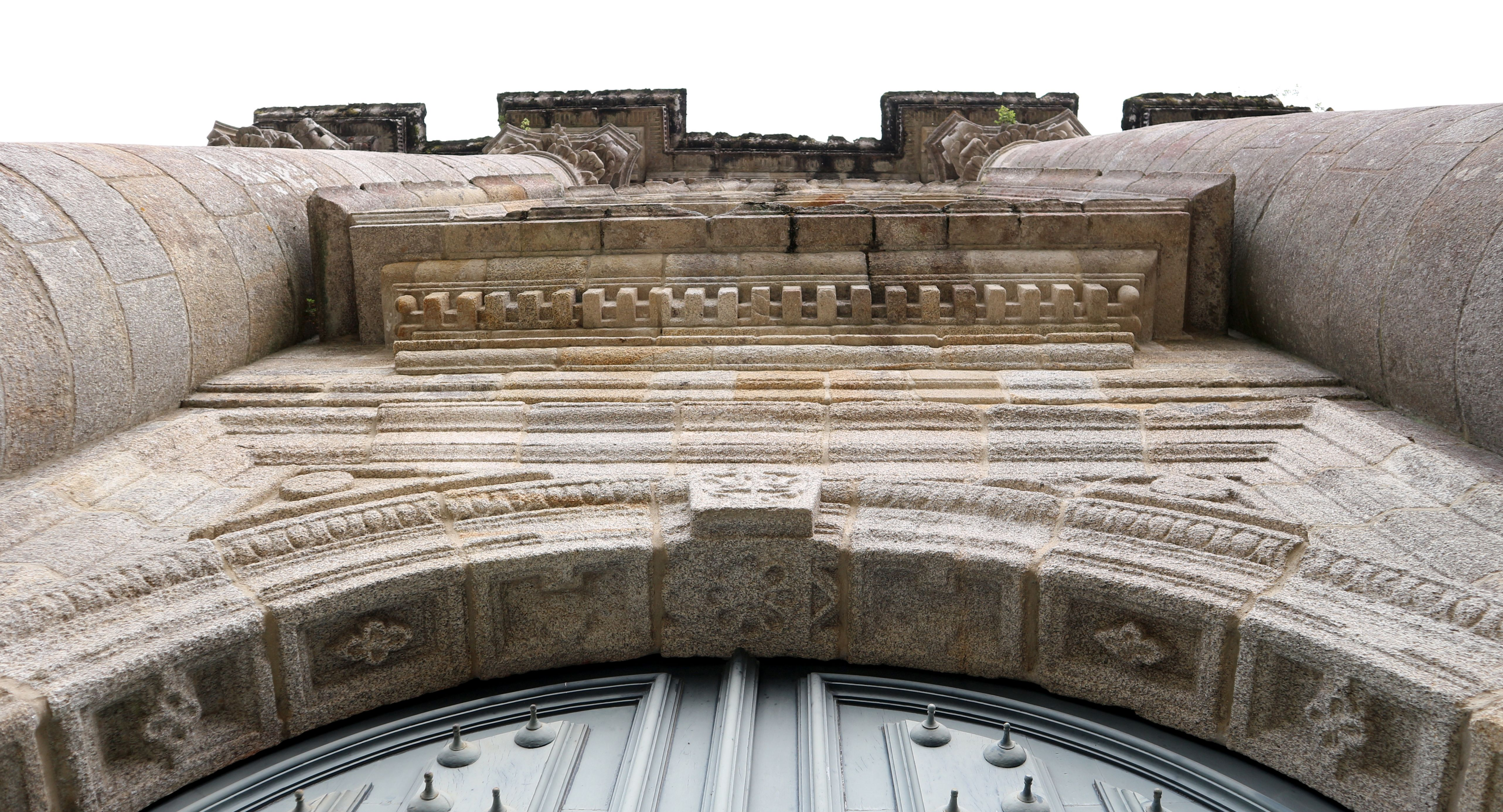
Church's facade details

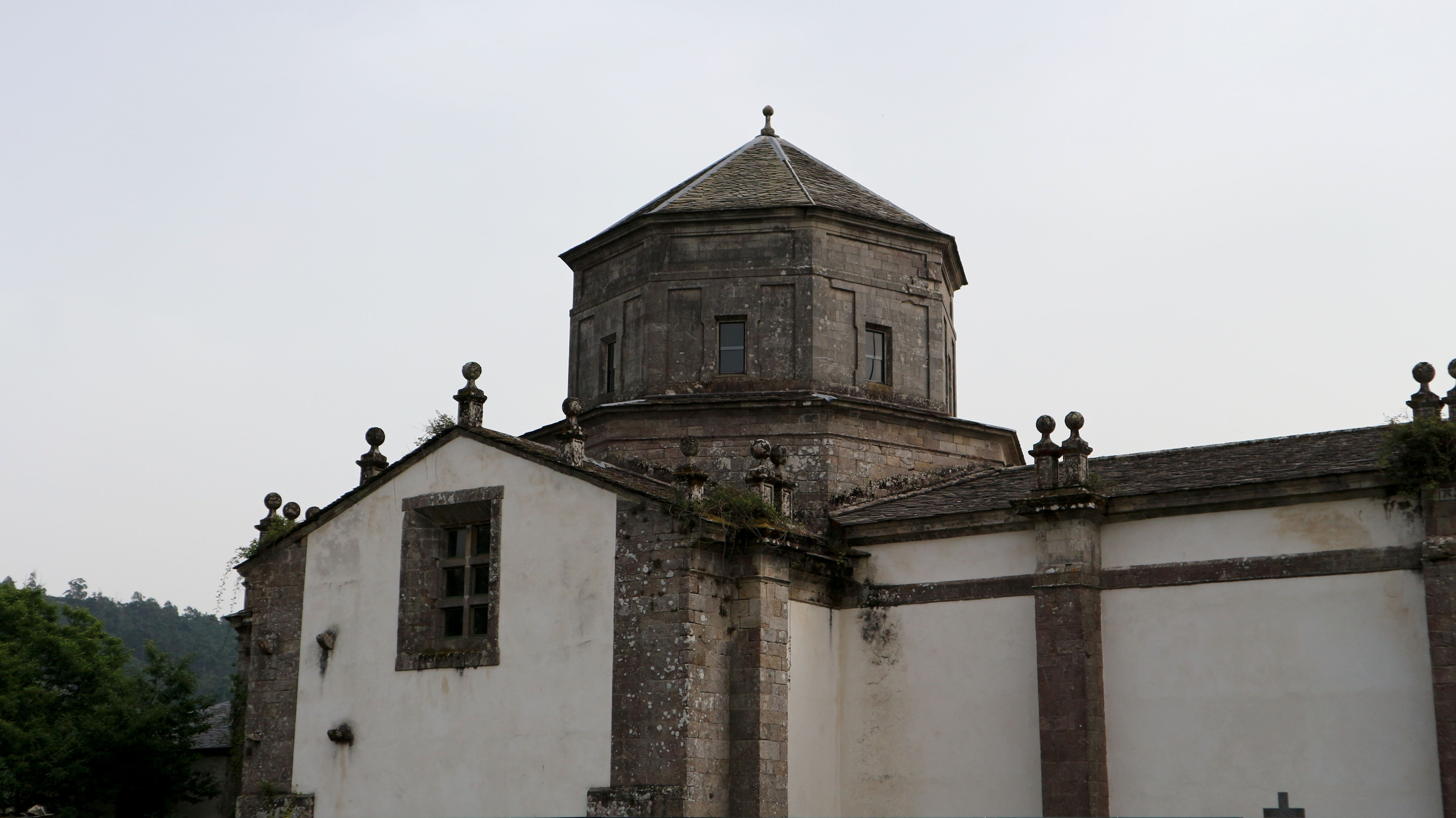
Church's roof

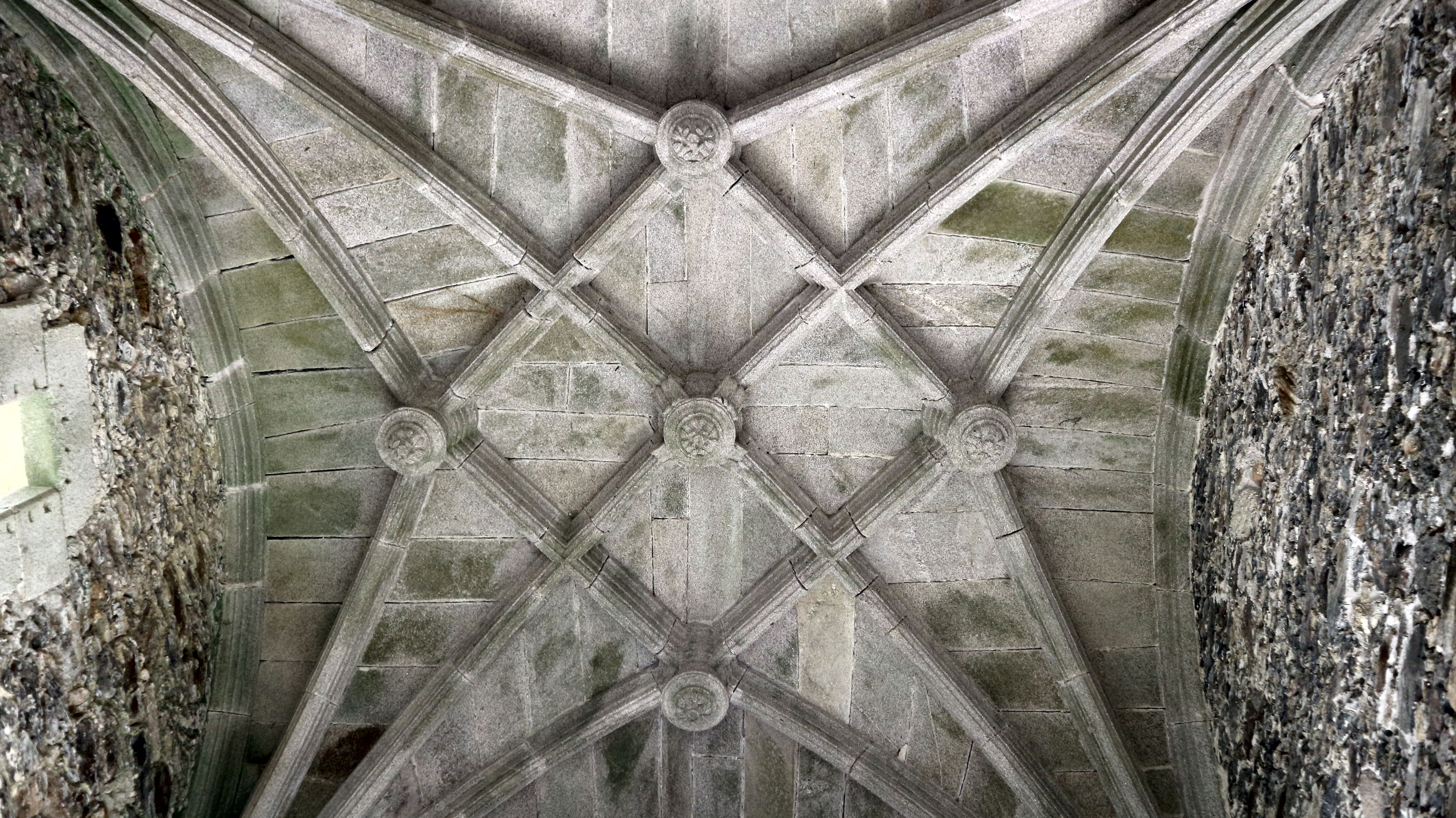
Abbey's vaults

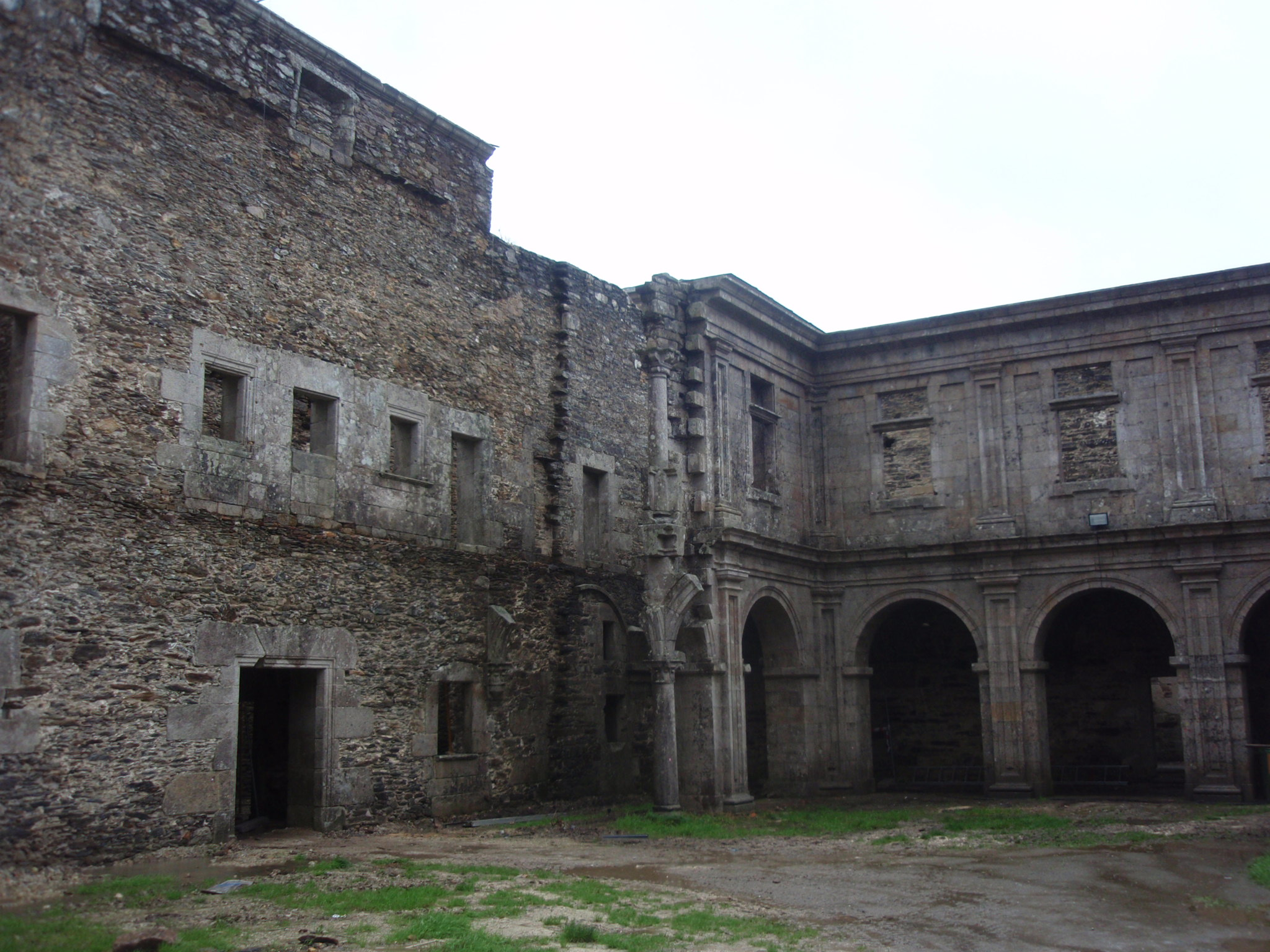
Cloister

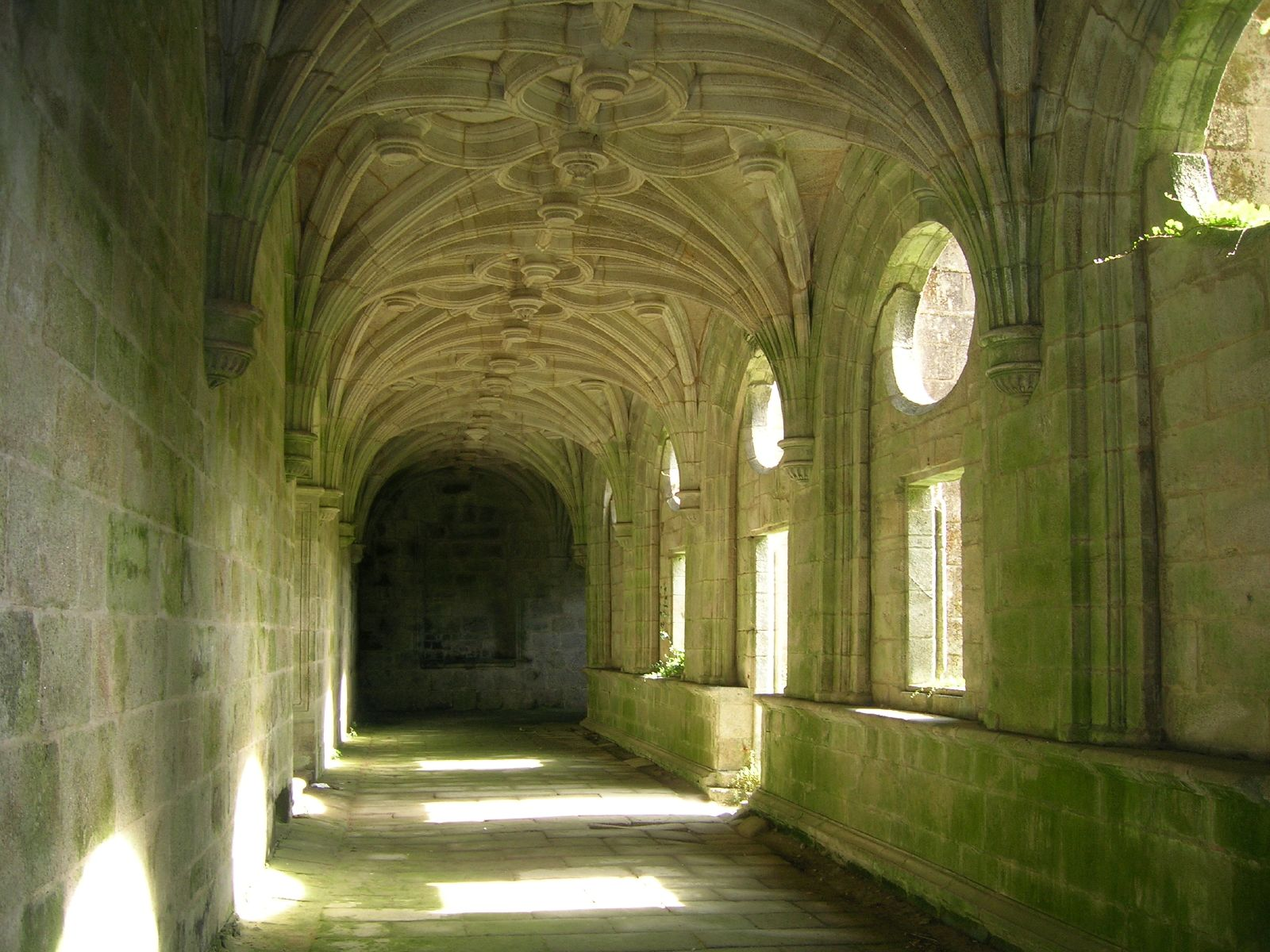
Cloister

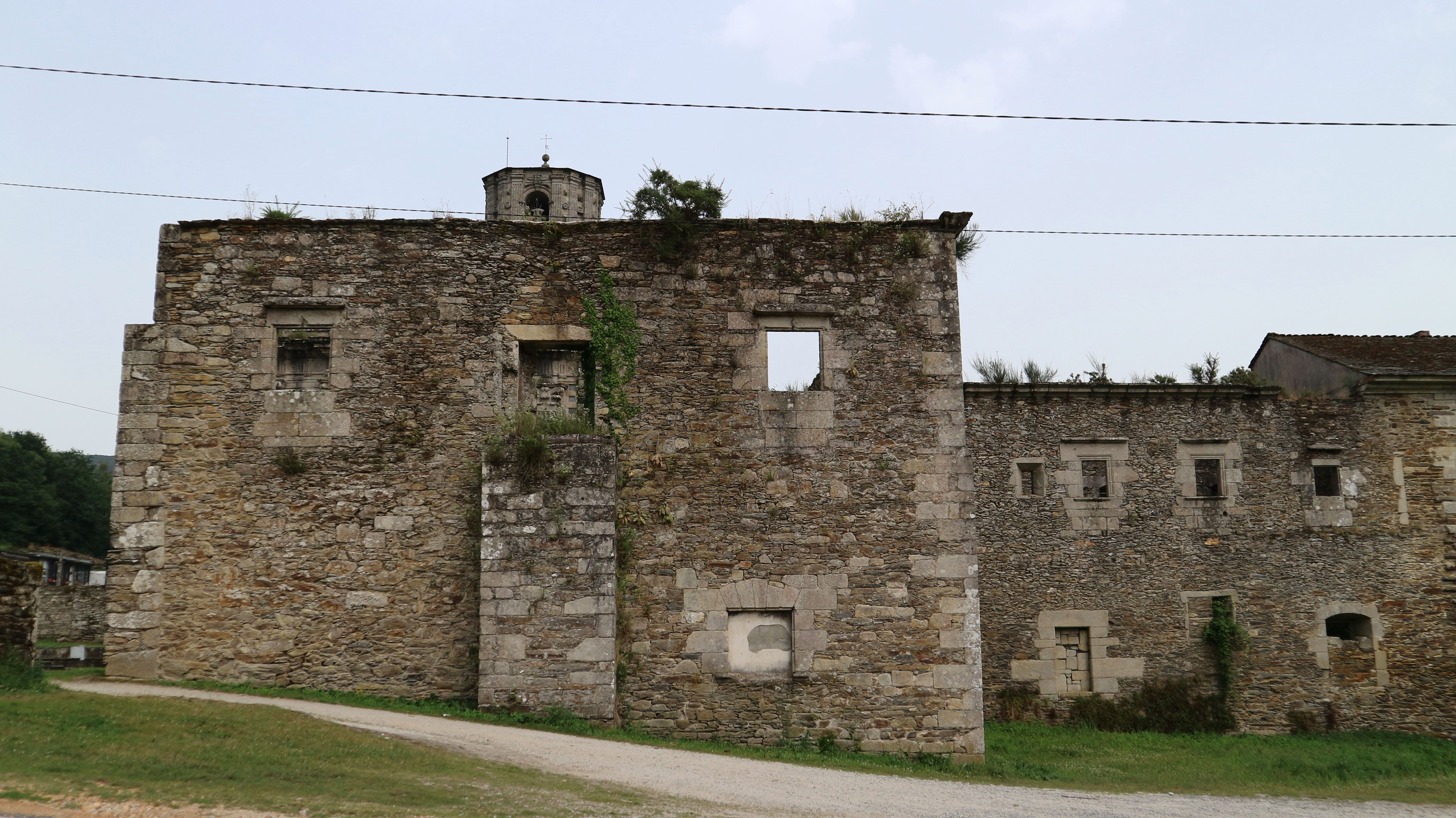
Abbey seen from the backside

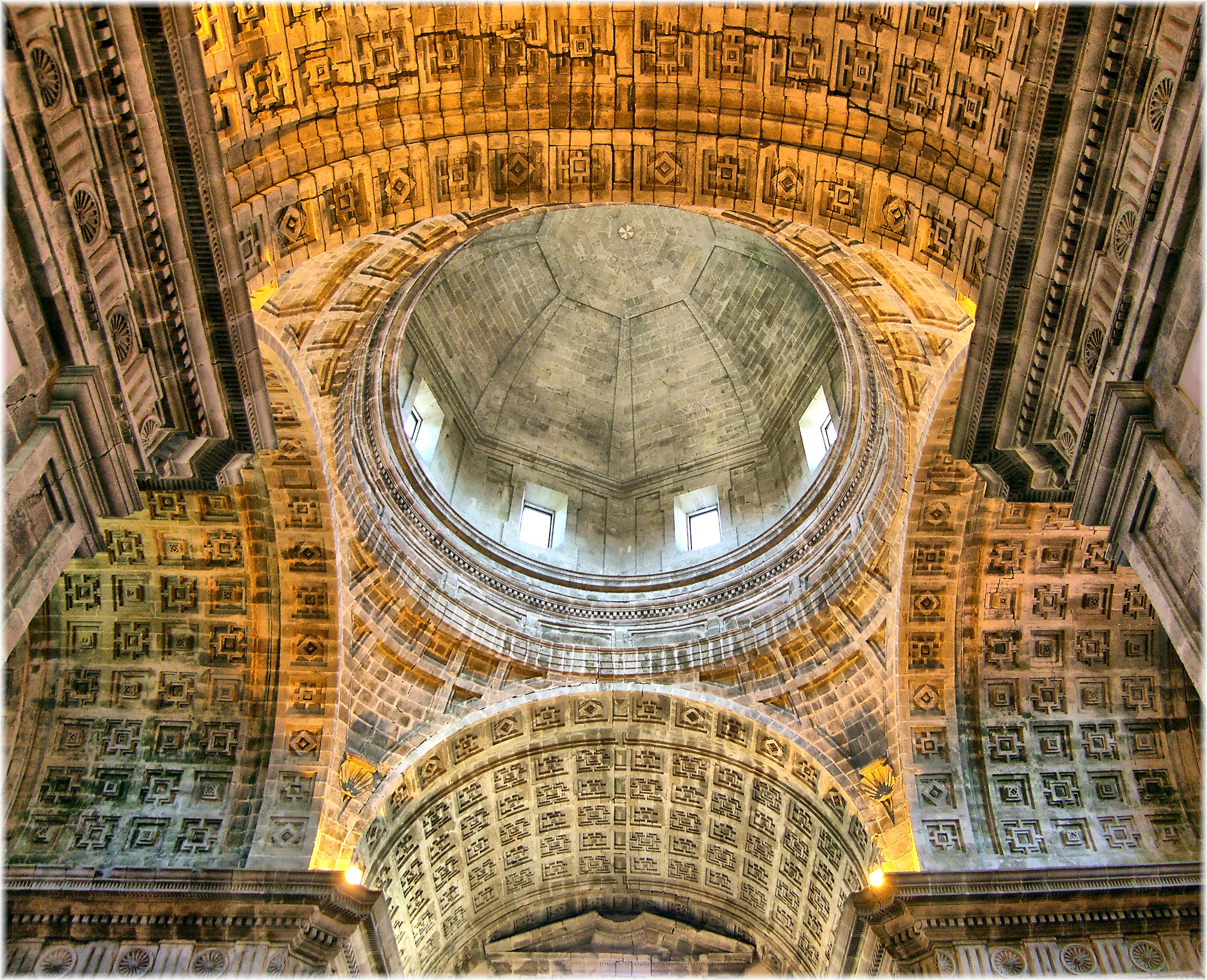
Dome's interior view

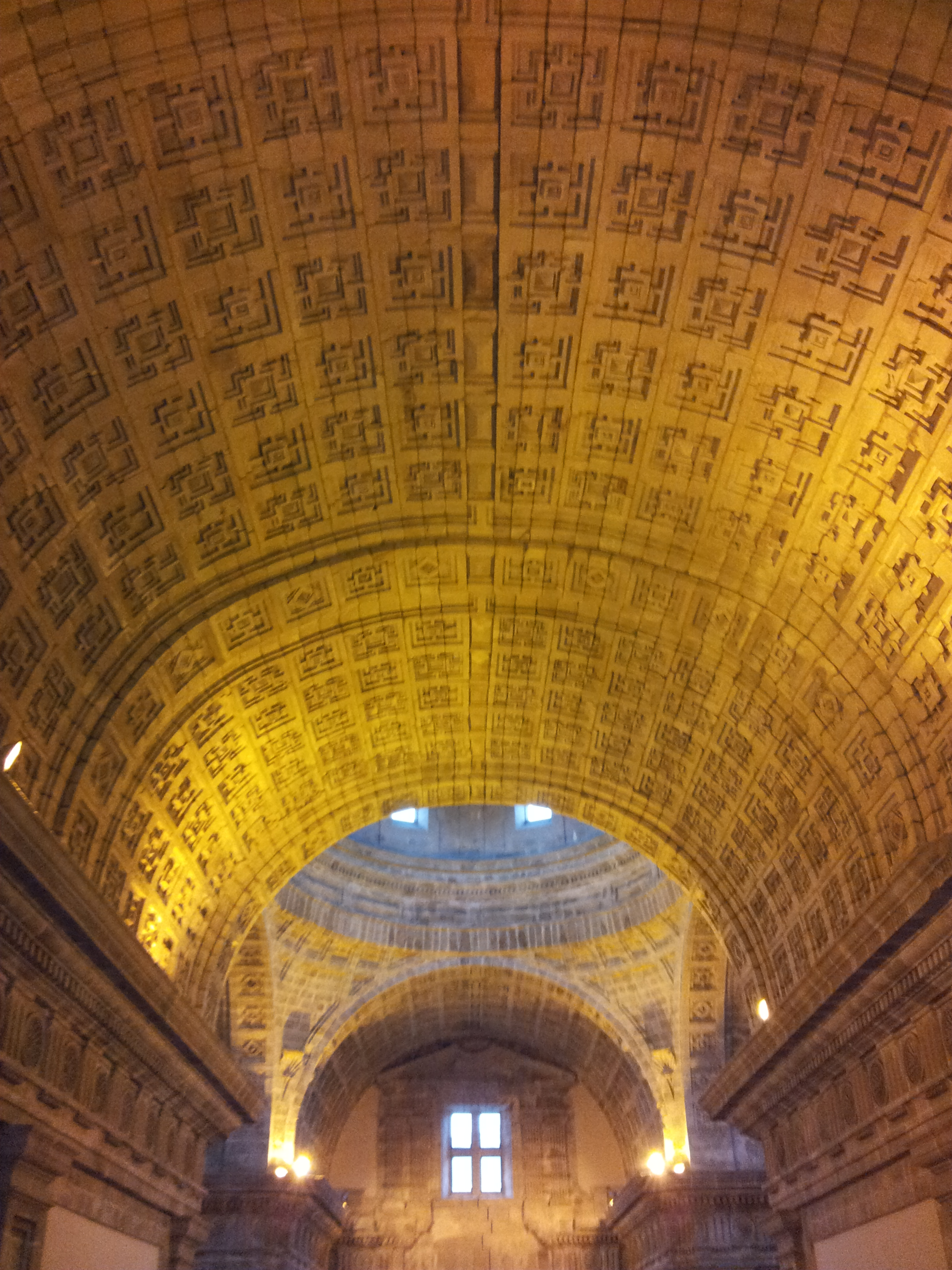
Dome's interior view

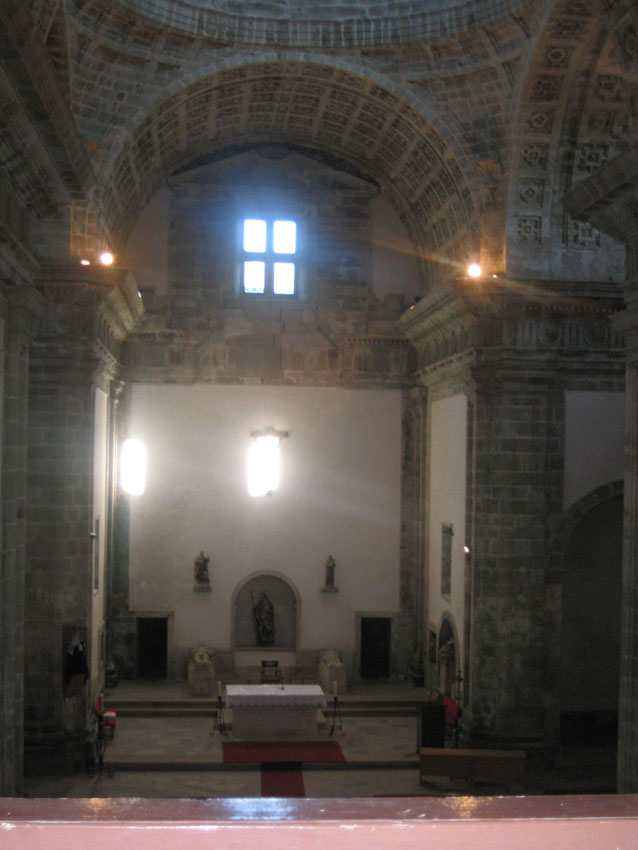
Church interior

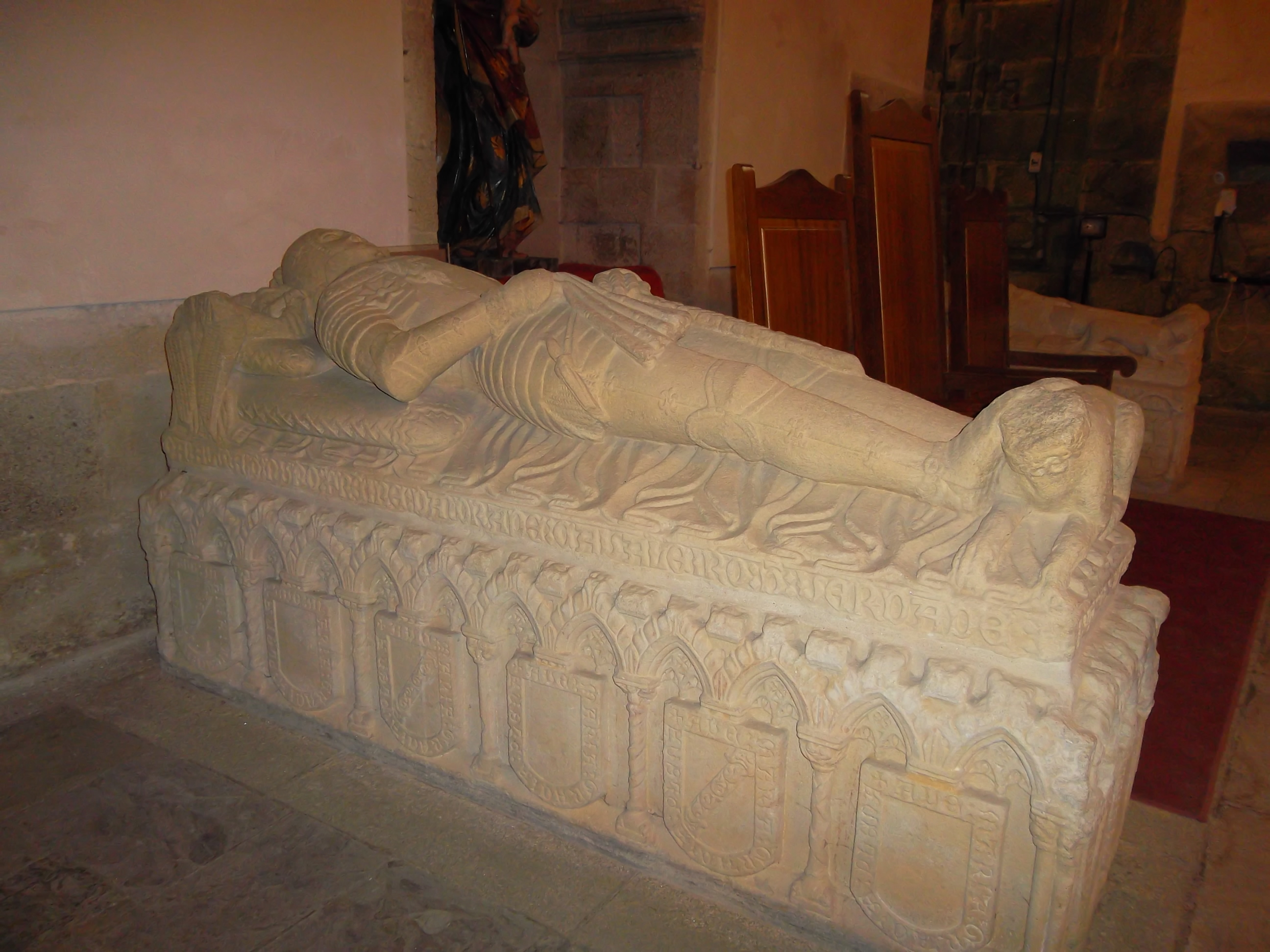
Tomb of lord Nuno Freire de Andrade, o Mao (died 1431), who ruled Pontedeume, Ferrol and Vilalba

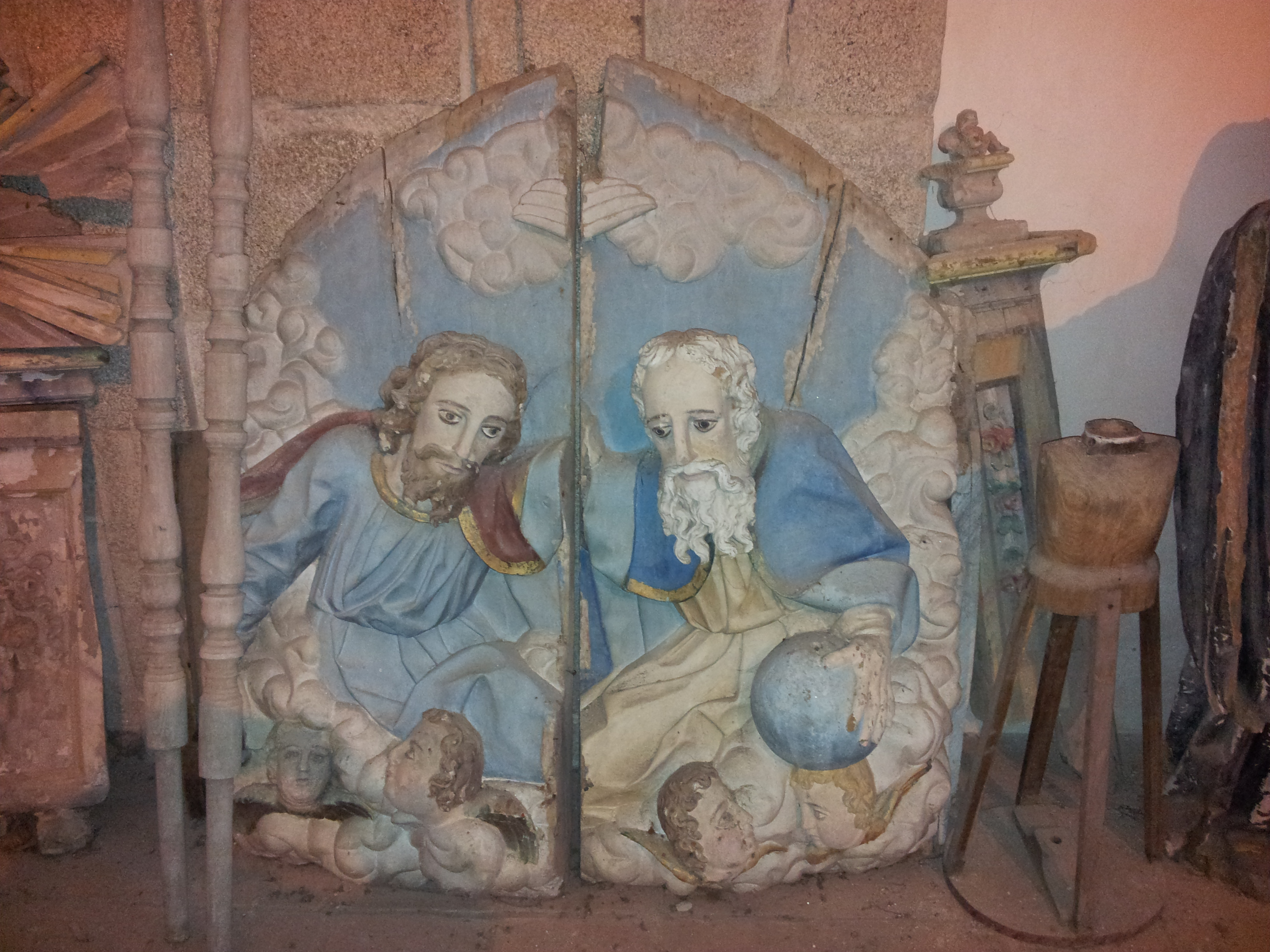
Church altarpiece

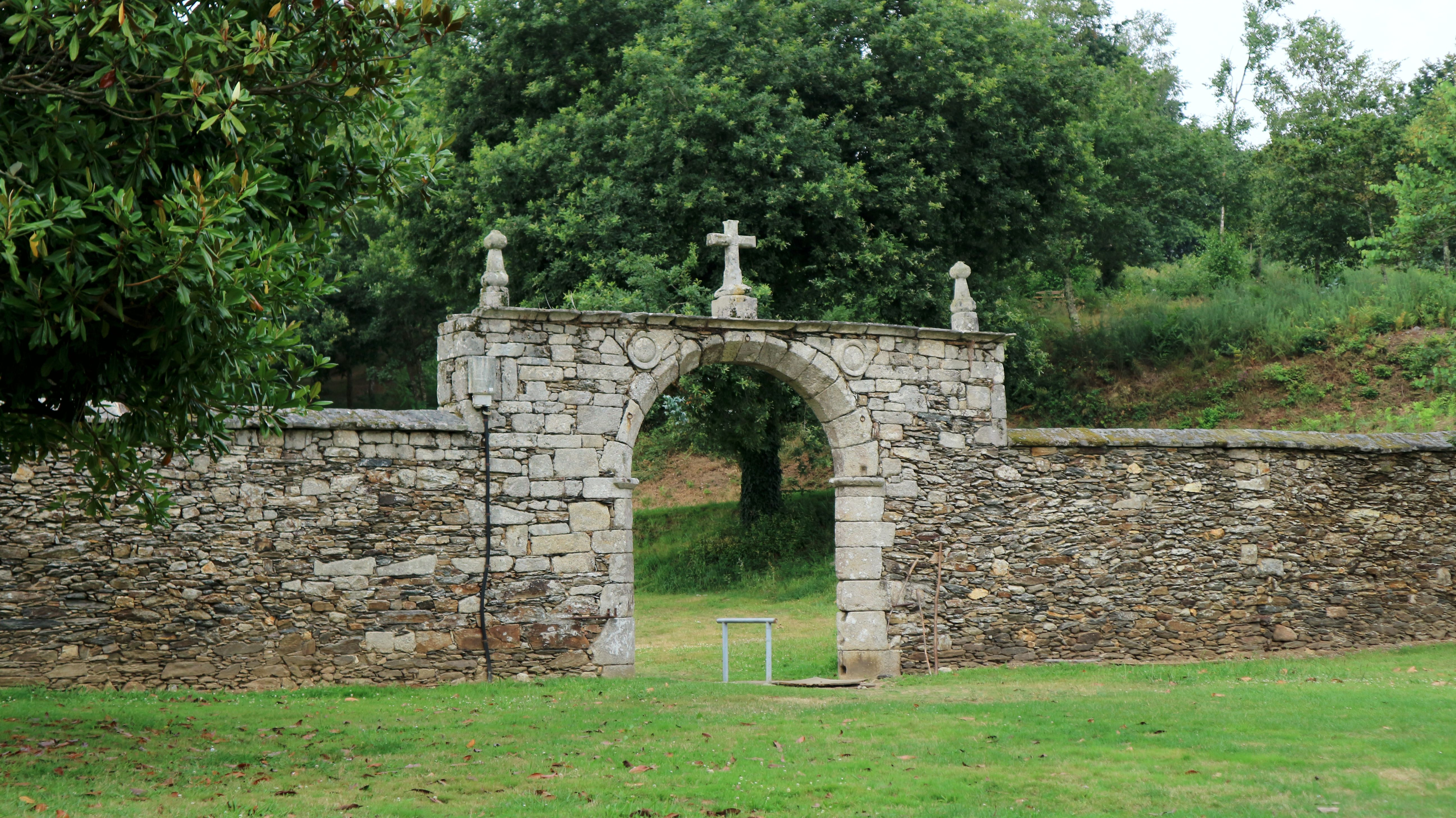
Entrance

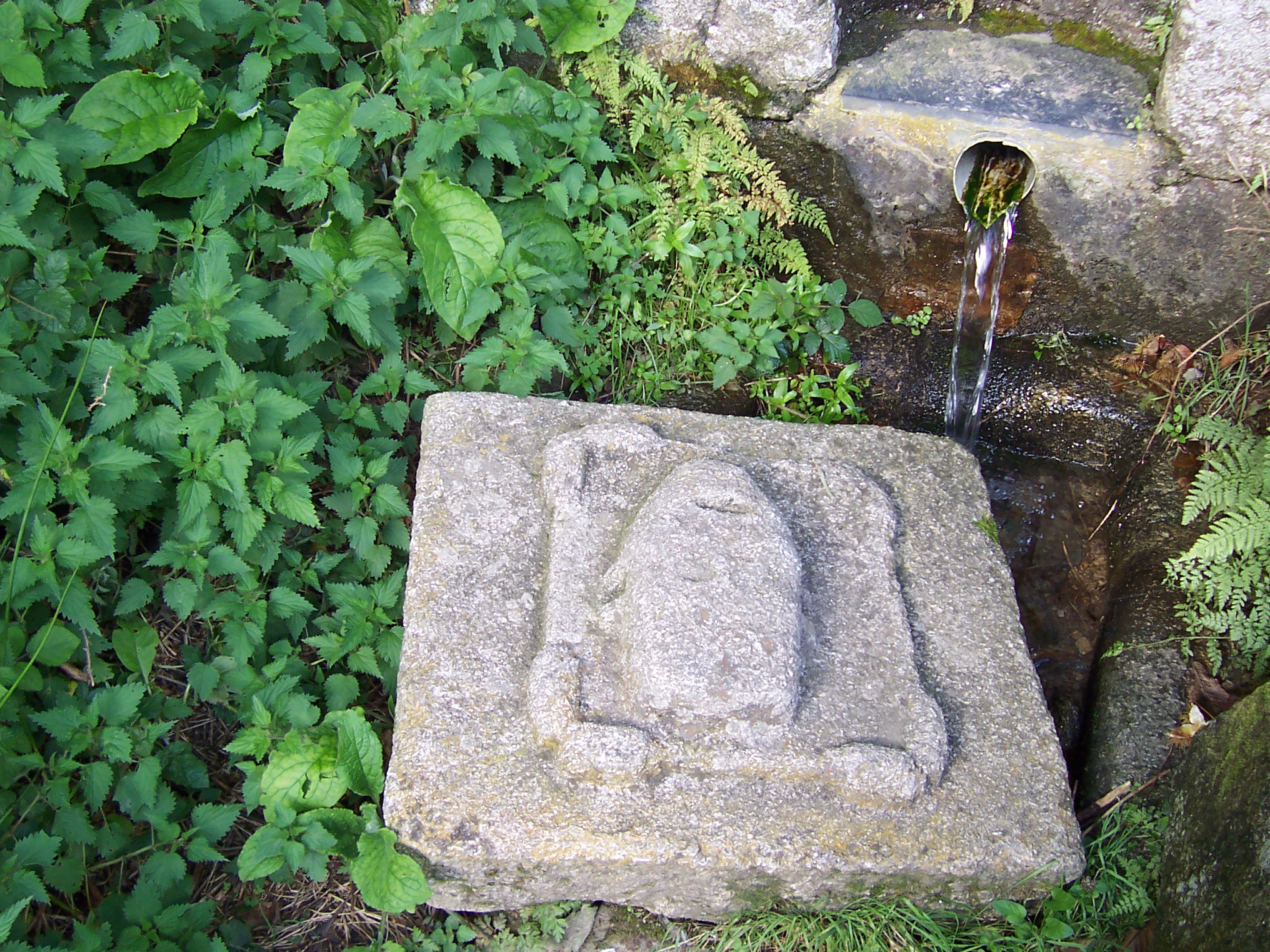
Fountain

== Sources ==
- Janauschek, Leopold, 1877: Originum Cisterciensium Liber Primus (repr. 1964). Vienna (in Latin)
