= House of Traba =

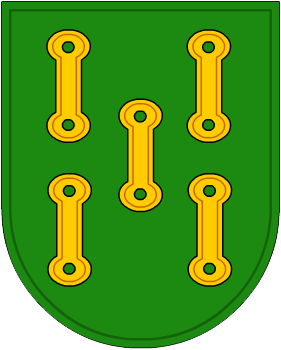
Coat of arms of the Traba family

The House of Traba (or Trava), sometimes called the Fróilaz-Traba, was a Galician noble family of the high Middle Ages. The family can be traced back to the eleventh century. They are associated with a castle named Traba, probably in the county of Bergantiños, and also with the county of Trastámara.

== Bibliography ==
- Barton, Simon F. (1997). The Aristocracy in Twelfth-century León and Castile. Cambridge: Cambridge University Press.
- López-Sangil, José Luis (1996). "La familia Fróilaz-Traba en la Edad Media gallega". Estudios Mindonienses. 12: 275–403.
- López-Sangil, José Luis (2002). La nobleza altomedieval gallega, la familia Froílaz-Traba. La Coruña: Toxosoutos, S.L. ISBN 84-95622-68-8.
- Pallarés Méndez, María del Carmen; Portela Silva, Ermelindo (1993). "Aristocracia y sistema de parentesco en la Galicia de los siglos centrales de la Edad Media: El grupo de los Traba". Hispania. 53 (185): 823–840. ISSN 0018-2141.
- Renzi, Francesco (2013). "Aristocrazia e monachesimo in Galizia nei secoli XII e XIII: la famiglia Fróilaz-Traba e i Cistercensi—Ipotesi di ricerca". Bullettino dell'Istituto Storico Italiano per Il Medio Evo. 115: 209–28.
- Torres Sevilla-Quiñones de León, Margarita Cecilia (1998). "Relaciones fronterizas entre Portugal y León en tiempos de Alfonso VII: el ejemplo de la casa de Traba" (PDF). Revista da Faculdade de Letras: Historia. 15 (1): 301–12. ISSN 0871-164X.
- Torres Sevilla-Quiñones de León, Margarita Cecilia (1999). Linajes nobiliarios de León y Castilla: siglos IX–XIII. Salamanca: Junta de Castilla y León, Consejería de educación y cultura. pp. 312–41. ISBN 84-7846-781-5.
