= Kapellen =

Kapellen may refer to the following places:

- Kapellen, Styria, Austria
- Kapellen, Belgium
- Kapellen-Drusweiler, Germany
- Geldern-Kapellen, Germany
- Kapellen, Grevenbroich, Germany

== See also ==
- Capellen (German: Kapellen), Luxembourg
- Capelle (disambiguation)
- Cappel (disambiguation)
- Kappel (disambiguation)
- Kapelle (disambiguation)
