= A cappella (disambiguation) =

Acappella is used as an adjective and adverb that mean unaccompanied singing.

Similar spellings, such as Acappella and variants, usually capitalized, may also refer to:

== Music ==
=== Artists ===
- Acappella (group), an all-male contemporary Christian vocal group

=== Albums ===
- A Cappella (Gaither Vocal Band album), 2003
- A Cappella (Todd Rundgren album), 1985
- Acappella, 1994, by Johnny Maestro & The Brooklyn Bridge

=== Songs and compositions ===
- "Acapella" (Karmin song), 2013
- "Acapella" (Kelis song), 2010
- "A capella" (Ylvis song), 2016
- A Capella, composition for choir by Morton Gould

== Other uses ==
- Acapella (trimaran), a boat
- A Capela, a municipality in province of A Coruña in the autonomous community of Galicia in north-western Spain

== See also ==
- Lists of a cappella groups
- Capella (disambiguation)
- Cappella (disambiguation)
- Capela (disambiguation)
