= Capella (disambiguation) =

Capella is a bright star in the constellation of Auriga.

Capella may also refer to:

== Places ==
- Capella, Queensland, a town in the Central Highlands Region, Australia
- Capella, Aragon, a municipality in Huesca, Spain
- Capella Island, a minor island of the U.S. Virgin Islands

== Hotels ==
- Capella Hotels and Resorts
  - Capella Bangkok
  - Capella Resort, Singapore

== Science and technology ==
- Capella (crater), an impact crater on the Moon
- Capella (engineering), an open-source engineering solution
- Capella Space, an American space company

== Music ==
- Capella (music), a musical ensemble
- Capella (notation program), a program by capella Software AG

== Transportation and industry ==
- Mazda Capella, a model of automobile
- USS Capella, a cargo ship of the United States Navy
- Capella (concrete ship), a concrete ship built in World War II
- Capella Aircraft, an American aircraft manufacturer

== Other uses ==
- Capella University, an online academic institution based in Minneapolis, Minnesota
- Gallinago or Capella, a genus of snipes

== People with the name ==
- Carlo Alberto Capella, Vatican diplomat convicted on child pornography charges
- Martianus Capella, writer and astronomer of late antiquity

== See also ==
- A cappella (disambiguation)
- Capela (disambiguation)
- Cappella (disambiguation)
- Capelle (disambiguation)
- Kapella (disambiguation)
