= Kapela =

Kapela may refer to:

== People ==
- Jan Kapela (1931–1987), Polish politician
- Jaś Kapela (born 1984), Polish poet

== Places ==
- Kapela, Bjelovar-Bilogora County, a village in north-central Croatia
- Kapela Kalnička, a village in northern Croatia
- Kapela, a mountain range in south-central Croatia
  - Mala Kapela, a mountain in south-central Croatia
  - Velika Kapela, a mountain in south-central Croatia
- Kostanjevica Monastery, referred to as Kapela by the locals

== See also ==
- Kapella (disambiguation)
- Kappela
- Kapelle (disambiguation)
- Capela (disambiguation)
- Capella (disambiguation)
