= Costrada from Pontedeume =

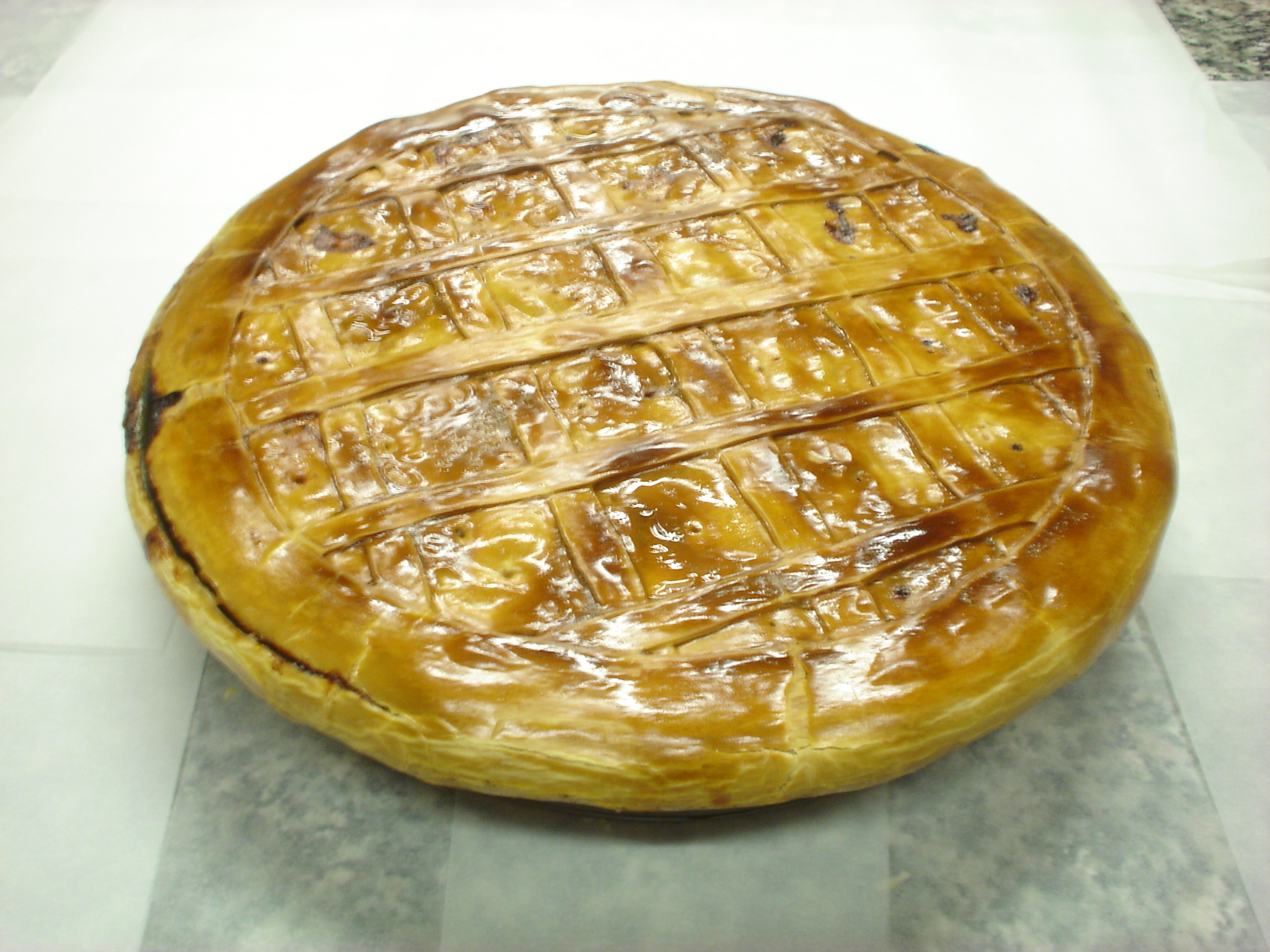
Costrada

Costrada is a typical Galician food from Pontedeume. There is a tradition that the recipe originated with a community of monks from Italy, perhaps belonging to the order of Saint Augustine, who brought the refectory of the monastery of Caaveiro in the 12th century. The use of this dish decreased greatly in the 20th century because of the cost of production.

== Description ==
Costrada consists of several layers of meat (chicken, ham and back bacon usually), or seafood (turbot and scallops). The dish is challenging because of its relatively expensive ingredients and its slow preparation.
