= Kapelle (disambiguation) =

Kapelle may refer to the following places:

== Belgium ==
- Kapelle-op-den-Bos, in Flemish Brabant
- Kapellen, Belgium, in the Belgian province of Antwerp
- Westkapelle, Belgium, in West Flanders

== Netherlands ==
- Kapelle, a town and municipality in Zeeland
- Kapelle, Schouwen-Duiveland, a hamlet in Zeeland
- Looperskapelle, formerly also known as Kapelle, in Zeeland
- Westkapelle, Netherlands, in Zeeland

== See also ==
- Capelle (disambiguation)
- Cappel (disambiguation)
- Kappel (disambiguation)
- Kapellen (disambiguation)
