= Capela =

Capela may refer to:

== Places ==
- Capela (Penafiel), a parish in Penafiel Municipality, Portugal
- Capela, Sergipe, a municipality in the Brazilian state of Sergipe
- Capela, Alagoas, a municipality in the Brazilian state of Alagoas
- Capela, Râmnicu Vâlcea, a neighborhood in Râmnicu Vâlcea
- Capela Hill, a hill in the western part of the Romanian town of Râmnicu Vâlcea
- A Capela, a place in Galicia, Spain
- Capelas, a civil parish on the island of São Miguel in the Portuguese Azores.

== People ==
- Aníbal Capela (born 1991), Portuguese professional footballer
- Clint Capela (born 1994), Swiss professional basketball player (NBA, Europe)
- Manuel Capela (born 1922), Portuguese footballer who played as goalkeeper
- Capela (footballer) (Fernando Jorge Barbosa Martins, born 1986), Portuguese football midfielder

== Music ==
- Mestre de capela
- Capela Real, Lisbon
- Capela Real do Rio de Janeiro, 1808

== See also ==
- Kapela (disambiguation)
- Cappella (disambiguation)
- Capella (disambiguation)
