= Pontedeume =

Pontedeume Puentedeume
- Municipality of Spain
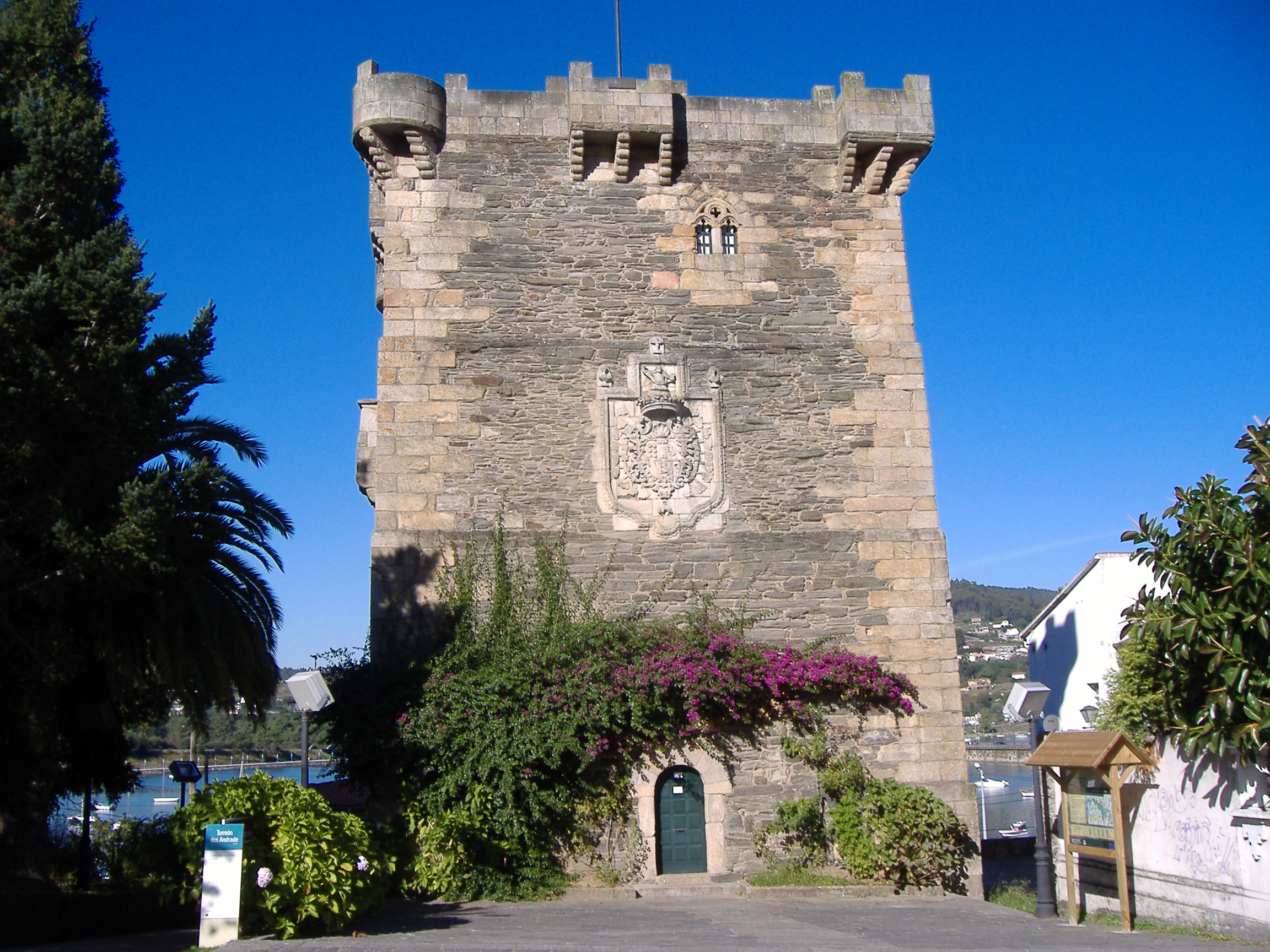
- Torreón dos Andrade

- Flag Coat of arms

- Location in Spain
- Coordinates: 43°24′45″N 08°10′13″W
- Country: Spain
- Autonomous community: Galicia
- Province: A Coruña
- Comarca: Eume
- Founder: Alfonso X of Castille

Government
  - Mayor: Bernardo Fernández

Area
  - Total: 29.26 km^{2} (11.30 sq mi)

Population (2025-01-01)
  - Total: 7,431
  - Density: 254.0/km^{2} (657.8/sq mi)
- Time zone: UTC+1 (CET)
  - Summer (DST): UTC+2 (CEST)
- Postal code: 15600
- Website: Official website

Pontedeume (Galician pronunciation: [ˌponteˈðewmɪ]) is a municipality in the province of A Coruña in the autonomous community of Galicia in northwestern Spain, It borders the municipalities of Miño, Cabañas, A Capela, Villarmaior and Monfero, located between the cities of La Coruña (38 km) and Ferrol (18 km) and near Betanzos (26 km) and Puentes de García Rodríguez (31 km).

The town was founded ex novo by the town charter of Alfonso X the Wise in 1270, and is one of the few Galician towns that has preserved its old historic center. Its streets and squares retain many traditional elements such as arcades, houses with wooden balconies and glass galleries, public fountains and numerous monumental buildings. All this, together with the rich landscape and nature of the surroundings, led to the Eume River region being declared a Historic Site and Picturesque Place in 1971. The town is located on the English Way path of the Camino de Santiago.

The town's emblem is the Eume River, which flows through the town and empties into the Atlantic Ocean. At this point, the estuary is formed, an area where strong tidal fluctuations occur.

The patron saint festivities in honor of Santiago are celebrated in September. The 8th is the feast day of Our Lady of Virtues or of Soto, and the 10th is the feast day of Saint Nicholas of Tolentino, patron saint and co-patron saint of the town, respectively.

== Geography ==
=== Situation ===
Puentedeume is located in the Costa Ártabra, at the mouth of the Eume River, in the Ares estuary. It is bordered to the north by the Ares estuary and the municipality of Cabañas, to the east by the municipality of Monfero, to the south by the municipalities of Vilarmaior and Miño, and to the west by the Betanzos estuary.

=== Orography ===
The western part of the municipality is dominated by Mount Breamo, at 305 meters, the last spur of the mountain range that, starting from the Sierra de la Loba, runs east to west to reach the sea, where it forms cliffs. The parish of Breamo is located on this mountain. The parishes of Boebre, Centroña, and Puentedeume are scattered across its slopes, between this mountain and the sea.

In the eastern part, geological material ranging from the Precambrian to the Paleozoic era predominates, with soils rich in organic matter and good drainage, both internal and surface. The terrain gradually rises in altitude, starting from the southern and eastern banks of the Eume River and reaching the borders with the municipalities of Monfero and Villarmayor. It is precisely on the border with the latter that the highest point of the municipality is found: the Allegue mountain range, at 414 meters above sea level. This section includes the parishes of Villar, Noguerosa, and Hombre. The easternmost part of the municipality, with its steep slopes, coincides with the final stretch of the Eume canyon and lies within the Fragas do Eume Natural Park.

South of these heights is the parish of Andrade, the southernmost in the municipality.

=== Parishes ===
Pontedeume is divided into 8 parishes:

- Andrade (San Martiño)
- Boebre (Santiago)
- Breamo (San Miguel)
- Centroña (Santa María)
- Nogueirosa (San Cosme)
- Ombre (Santa María)
- Pontedeume (Santiago)
- Vilar (San Pedro)

== Industry ==
Farming and services are the main economic activities, though from the late 1950s, and particularly from the mid 1970s, Pontedeume has developed into a coastal resort.

== Demography ==
In 1868 and from 1877 to 1890 the territory of Vilarmaior was a part of the municipality of Pontedeume. This explains the pronounced fall in the population between 1877 and 1900.

Historical population

Year	Pop.	±%
1877	8,610	—
1887	8,659	+0.6%
1900	6,097	−29.6%
1910	6,989	+14.6%
1920	7,160	+2.4%
1930	7,576	+5.8%
1940	8,183	+8.0%

Year	Pop.	±%
1950	8,347	+2.0%
1960	8,395	+0.6%
1970	8,227	−2.0%
1980	8,714	+5.9%
1990	8,817	+1.2%
2000	8,696	−1.4%
2010	8,305	−4.5%

INE Archiv

== Notable people ==
- Fátima Rodríguez (b. 1961), Spanish writer, translator

== See also ==
List of municipalities in A Coruña
