= Kapella =

Kapella may refer to:

- Kapella River, in Canada
- M/S Kapella, a ship

== See also ==
- Kappela, a 2020 film
- Kapela (disambiguation)
- Kapelle (disambiguation)
- Capella (disambiguation)
