= Kapell =

Kapell is a surname. Notable people with the surname include:

- Matthew Kapell (born 1969), American historian and anthropologist
- William Kapell (1922–1953), American pianist and recording artist

== See also ==
- Kapel (disambiguation)
- Kappel (disambiguation)
