= Marbach, Marburg =

Marbach
- Borough of Marburg
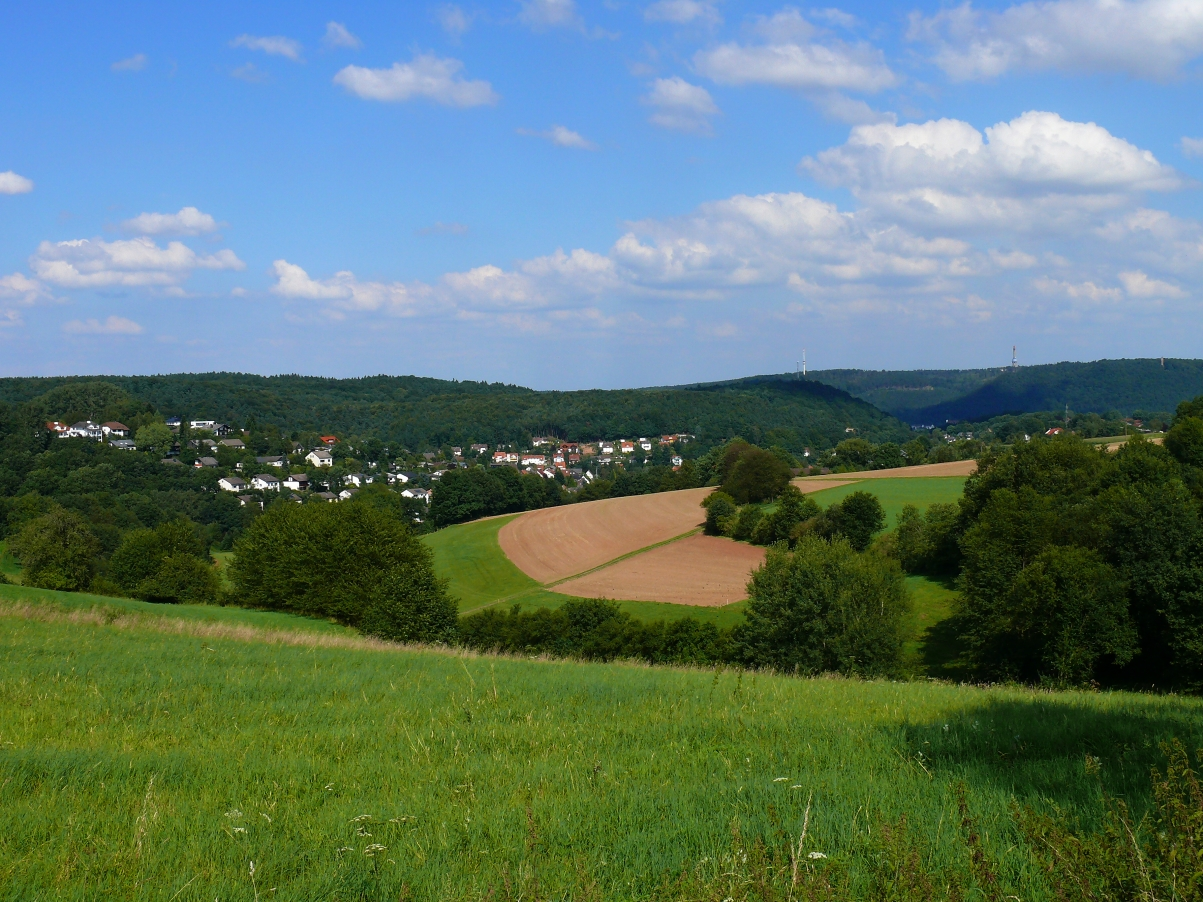
- View on Marbach from west

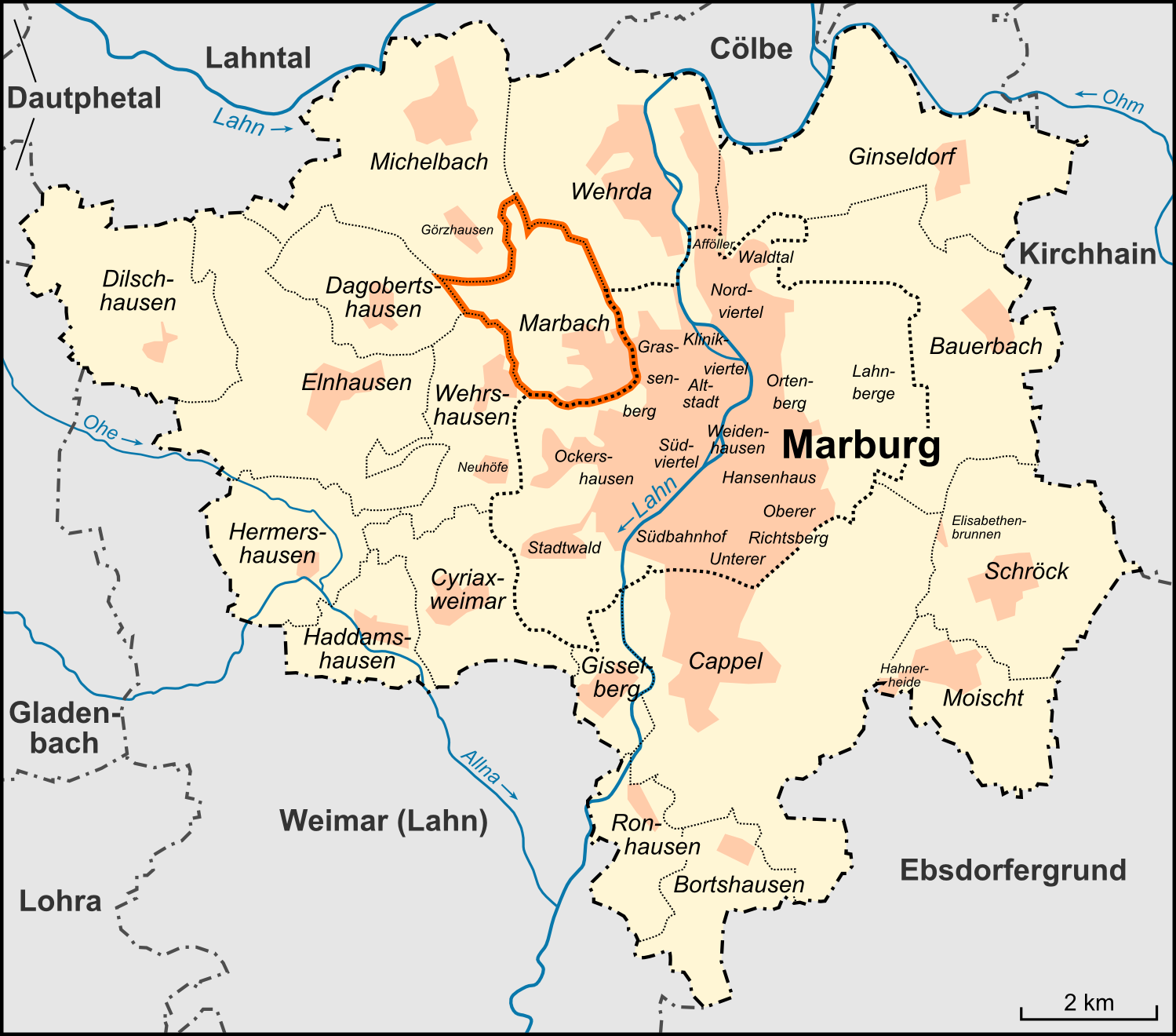
- District Marbach of the city Marburg
- Interactive map of Marbach
- Location within Germany Location within Hesse
- Coordinates: 50°49′8″N 8°44′47″E
- Country: Germany
- State: Hesse
- District: Marburg-Biedenkopf
- Town: Marburg

Area
  - Total: 4.04 km^{2} (1.56 sq mi)
- Elevation: 276 m (906 ft)

Population (2019-12-31)
  - Total: 3,354
  - Density: 830/km^{2} (2,150/sq mi)
- Time zone: UTC+01:00 (CET)
  - Summer (DST): UTC+02:00 (CEST)
- Postal codes: 35041
- Dialling codes: 06421
- Website: www.marburg.de

Marbach (German pronunciation: [ˈmaʁbax]) is a borough (Ortsbezirk) of Marburg in Hesse. Marbach has a current population of approx. 3,400 inhabitants.

== History ==
Marbach was mentioned in 1272 with the name Marpah. Also it was noticed in the register of the city of Marburg in 1374, where Marbach was a small village of the Landgraves of Thuringia, beside the other districts Ockershausen, Wehrda and Cappel.

== Notable people ==
- Heinrich Freudenstein (1 February 1863 in Maden – 15 February 1935), beekeeper, former mayor of Marbach (1919–1934), and builder of the elementary school
