= Fragas do Eume =

Natural Park of Spain

Coordinates: 43°25′03″N 08°04′06″W

Fragas do Eume Natural Park
- Fragas do Eume
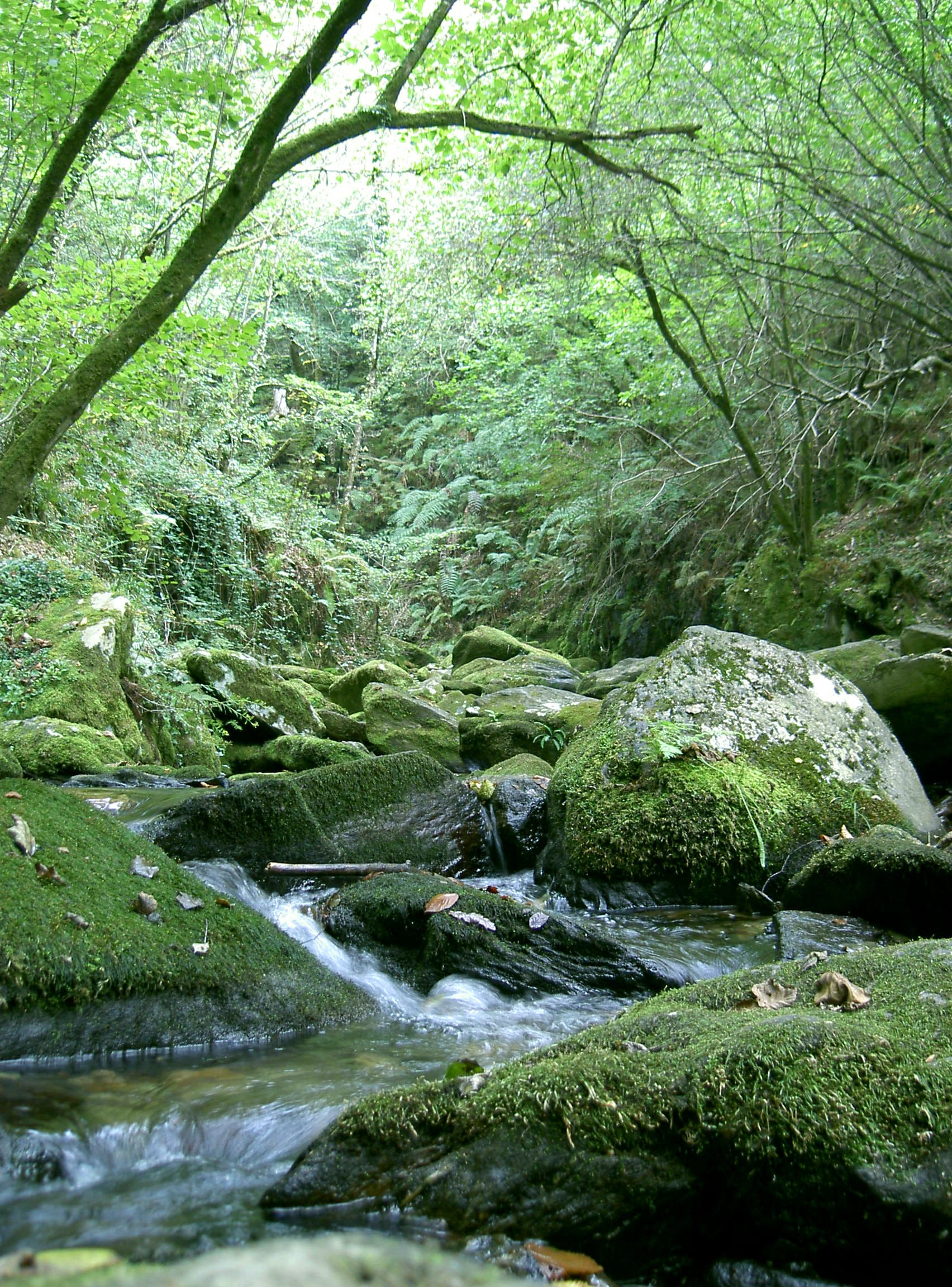
- Interactive map of Fragas do Eume Natural Park
- Location: Galicia (Spain)
- Established: 1997
- Governing body: Xunta de Galicia

The Fragas do Eume is a natural park situated in north-west Spain. Fraga is a Galician word for "natural woodland", (old-growth forest) and the park is an example of a temperate rainforest in which oak (Quercus robur and Quercus pyrenaica) is the climax vegetation. The protected area extends along the valley of the Eume River within the Ferrol municipalities of Pontedeume, Cabanas, A Capela, Monfero, Pontedeume, and As Pontes de García Rodríguez. Less than 500 people reside within the park, where the San Juan de Caaveiro Monastery can also be found here.

The area was declared a natural park (a level of protection lower than national park) in 1997. It is one of six natural parks in Galicia. The European Union has recognized the park as a Site of Community Importance. In addition to its wide variety of ferns, it is an important site for amphibians and invertebrates such as the Kerry slug.

== Flora and fauna ==
The Fragas do Eume is a mixed forest, considered one of the most extensive and best preserved on Europe's Atlantic coast. The slopes of the river gorge are covered by oak and chestnut trees, alongside a wide variety of ferns and lichen.

The park is home to 103 species of birds, 41 species of mammals, eight species of fish, and endemic invertebrates, reptiles, and amphibians such as the Iberian frog.

== 2012 fire ==
In 2012, a fire destroyed a section of the park, with initial estimates stating that 750 hectares had burned. Emergency services were called in to fight the blaze, and it was considered to be "controlled" by April 2nd.

== Gallery ==
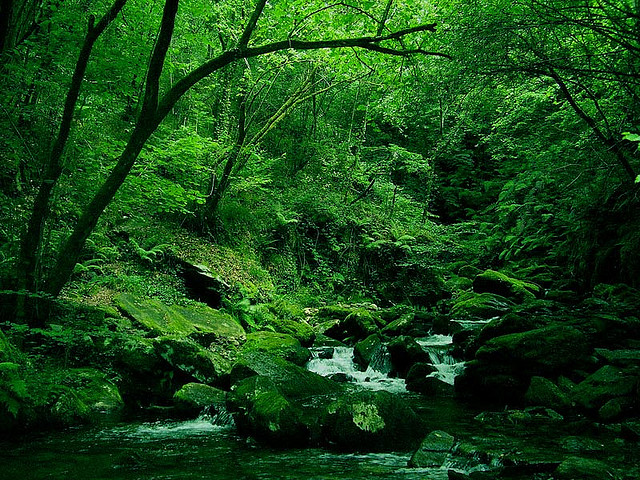
Creek in the park

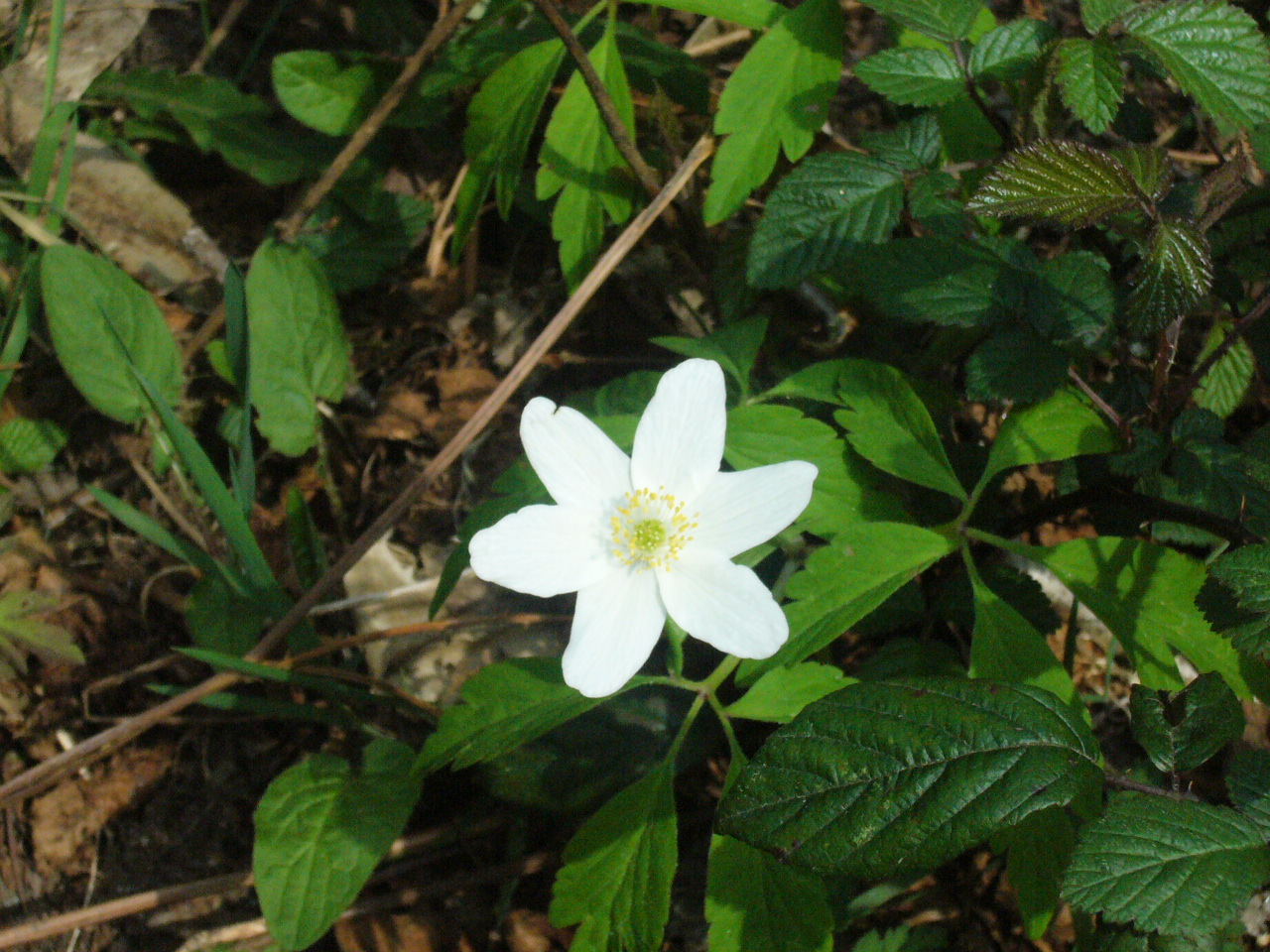
Anemone nemorosa

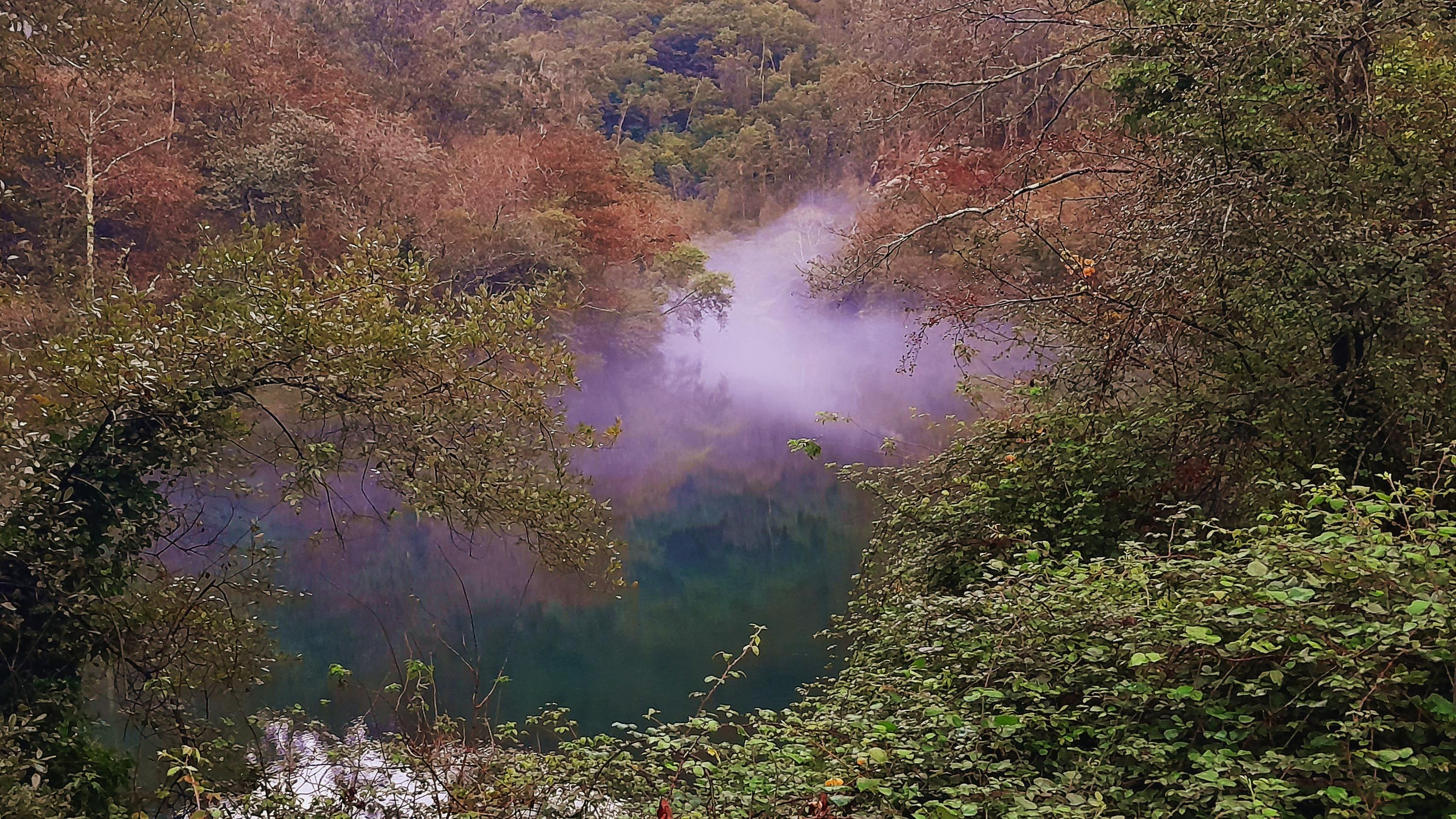
Rio Eume, October 2023

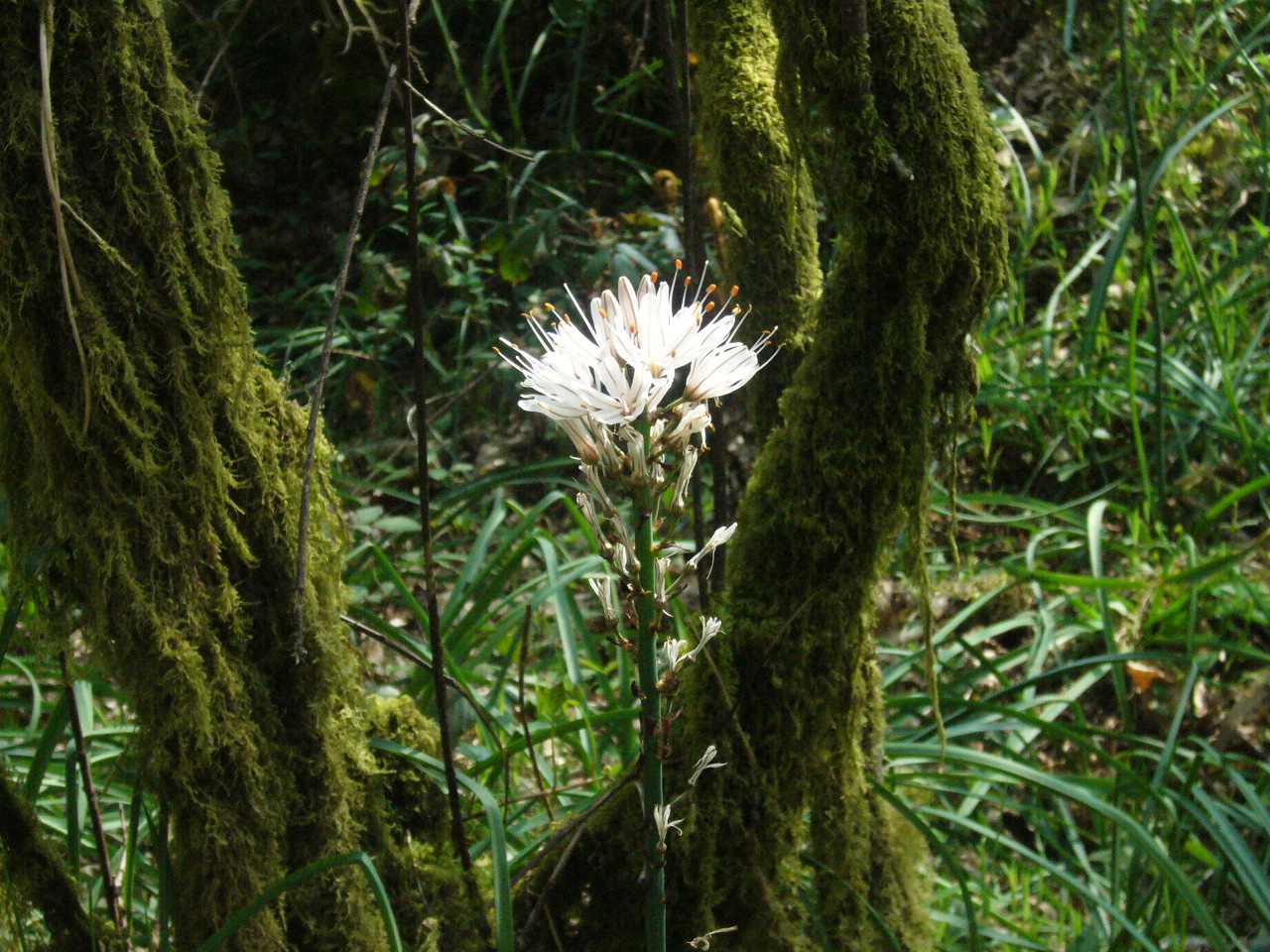
Asphodelus albus

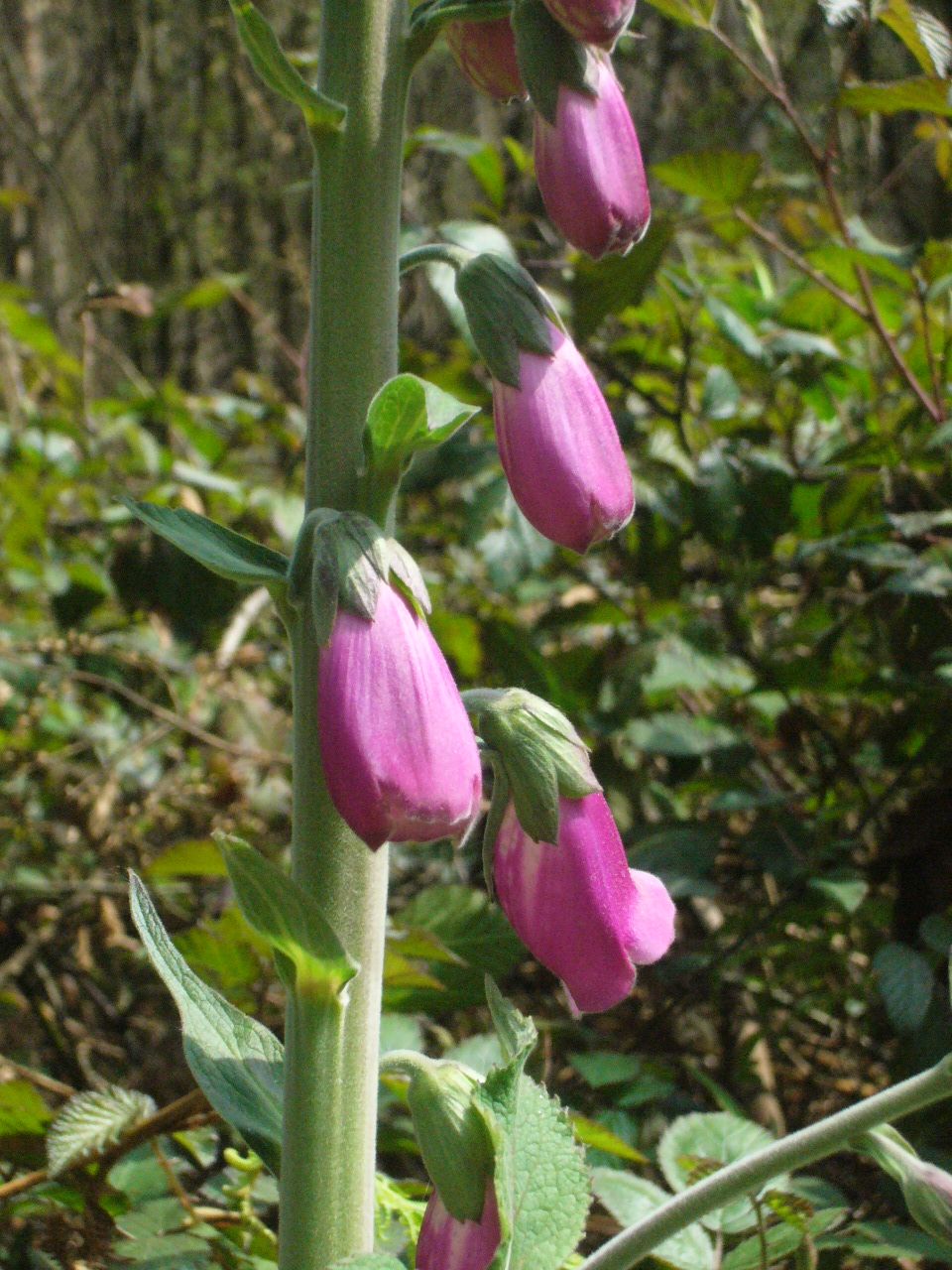
Digitalis purpurea

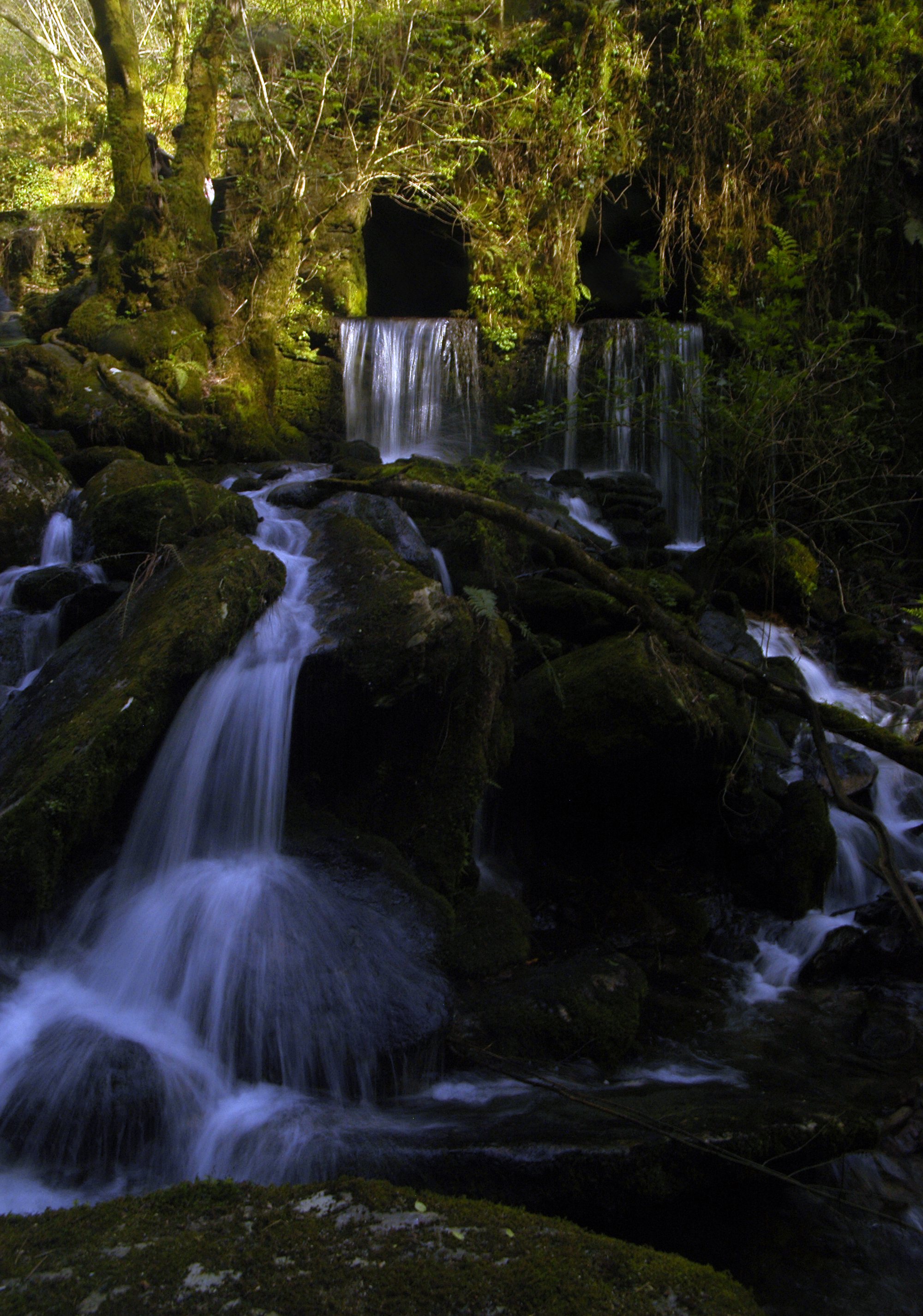
Waterfall

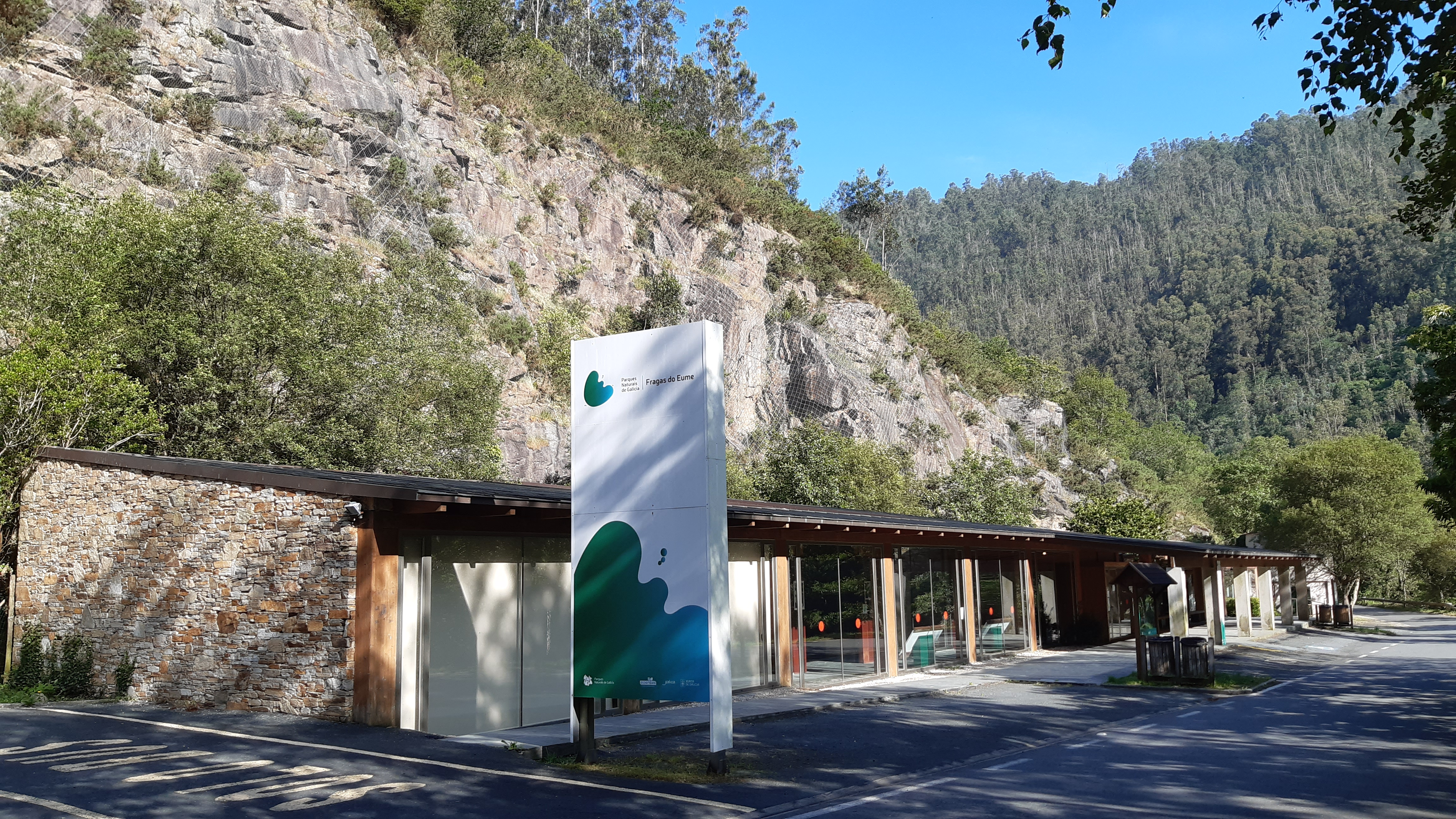
Visitor center
