= Fátima Rodríguez =

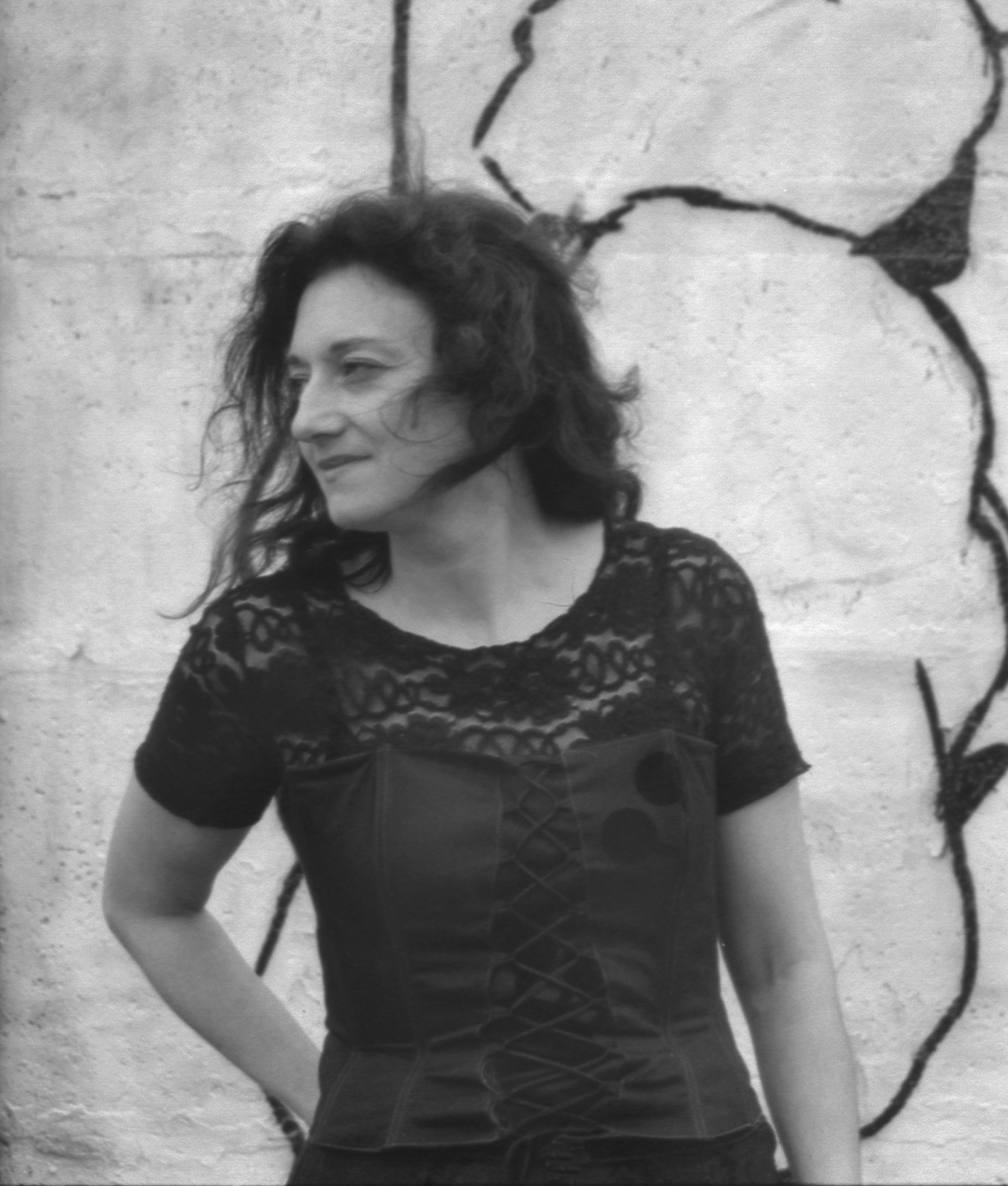
Fátima Rodríguez, 2006

Fátima Rodríguez (born 15 May 1961 in Pontedeume, Galicia) is a Spanish Galician writer, and a translator in Galician and Spanish languages. She is also a professor at the University of Western Brittany in Brest, France.

== Biography ==
Rodríguez studied Romance languages at the University of Santiago de Compostela. In France, after completing a Doctorate in Comparative literature, she settled in Toulouse between 1983 and 2008. Between 1991 and 1993, she continued her studies with a Master's degree in translation studies at the Autonomous University of Barcelona. She completed her training as a Romanist through travels in Romania and Italy, where she further specialized in the contemporary literature of these regions.

During her residence in Toulouse, she collaborated with the Casa de Galicia in the region to promote the dissemination of Galician culture. As a researcher, she has studied female writers from the Caribbean. She regularly publishes articles on languages and cultures in contact with Spanish-speaking countries and Latin America. Since 2008, she lives in Brest and works at the University of Western Brittany. The origin of the writer, the Galician culture and her language constitute a central theme of Rodríguez's poetry. From time to time, this reference becomes political, as in the poem "Nos outros" (With the others), included in the book EXIL - témoignages sur la Guerre d'Espagne, les camps et la résistance au franquisme. This theme also expresses a regret.

In the academic sphere, Rodríguez publishes in French, Spanish, and Galician. She is a member of Red Francesa de Estudios Gallegos and of the Asociación Caribeña de Estudios del Caribe.

== Selected works ==
=== Literary publications ===
- Amencida dos corpos/Amanecida de los cuerpos, poesía (gallego; trad. española de Jorge Ledo), Editorial Praxis, Mexico City, 2005, ISBN 968-7646-33-0
- Limite de propiedad, poesía (trad. española de Gloria Vergara), Editorial Torremozas, Madrid, 2006, ISBN 978-84-7839-368-8
- Oblivionalia, poesía (gallego; trad. francesa de Vincent Ozanam), Les Hauts-Fonds, Brest, 2010, ISBN 978-2-9532332-7-8

=== Academic publications ===
- Fátima Rodríguez, "Les je(ux) de l’énonciation dans l’Erotica de X. L. Méndez Ferrín", in: L’espace du corps 1. Littérature. Seminaria, 1, Rilma 2-ADEHL, México-Limoges, 2007, p. 61-70 (in French)
- Fátima Rodríguez, "Otras proyecciones de la materia textual. La Pasión de los nómades de María Rosa Lojo. Historias heterógrafas.", in: Le Texte et ses liens II, Paris-Sorbonne, 2005-2006, ISSN 1954-3239 (in Spanish)
- Fátima Rodríguez y Laura Eurenia Tudoras, "Las fronteras ascendentes de Paul Morand: Flèche d'Orient y Bucarest", in: Revista de Filología Románica, n° 20, Madrid, 2003, ISSN 0212-999X, p. 179-190 (in Spanish)
- Fátima Rodríguez y Laura Eurenia Tudoras, "Viajes azarosos: la aventura de la insularidad en la narrativa puertorriqueña: Vecindarios excéntricos de Rosario Ferré", in: Revista de Filología Románica, n° 22, Madrid, 2005, ISSN 0212-999X, p. 193-200 (in Spanish)

== Sources ==
- (in Galician) Vicente Araguas, "No cerrar los ojos al evidente", en: Diario de Ferrol, Ferrol (Galicia), 13 June 2010, p. 30
- (in Galician) Xosé María Dobarro, "Profesora y poeta", en: Diario de Ferrol, Ferrol (Galicia), 23 May 2010, p. 20
- (in French) María Rosa Lojo, "Música en el vacío", prefacio a Oblivionalia, Brest, 2010
- (in Spanish) Minerva Salado, La lengua migrante de Fátima Rodríguez, en: Archipiélago. Revista cultural de nuestra América, n° 56, México, D. F. 2007, p. 33-35
