= Cappella =

Cappella may refer to:

- Cappella (band), Italian electronic music group
- a cappella, unaccompanied singing

== People with the surname ==
- Felix Cappella (1930–2011), Canadian race walker
- Scipione Cappella (fl. 18th century), Italian painter

== See also ==
- A cappella (disambiguation), including "A Cappella"
- Capella (disambiguation)
- Capela (disambiguation)
- Kappela, a 2020 Indian film
