= O Eume =

Coordinates: 43°24′18″N 8°02′12″W

- Comarca
- Flag Coat of arms
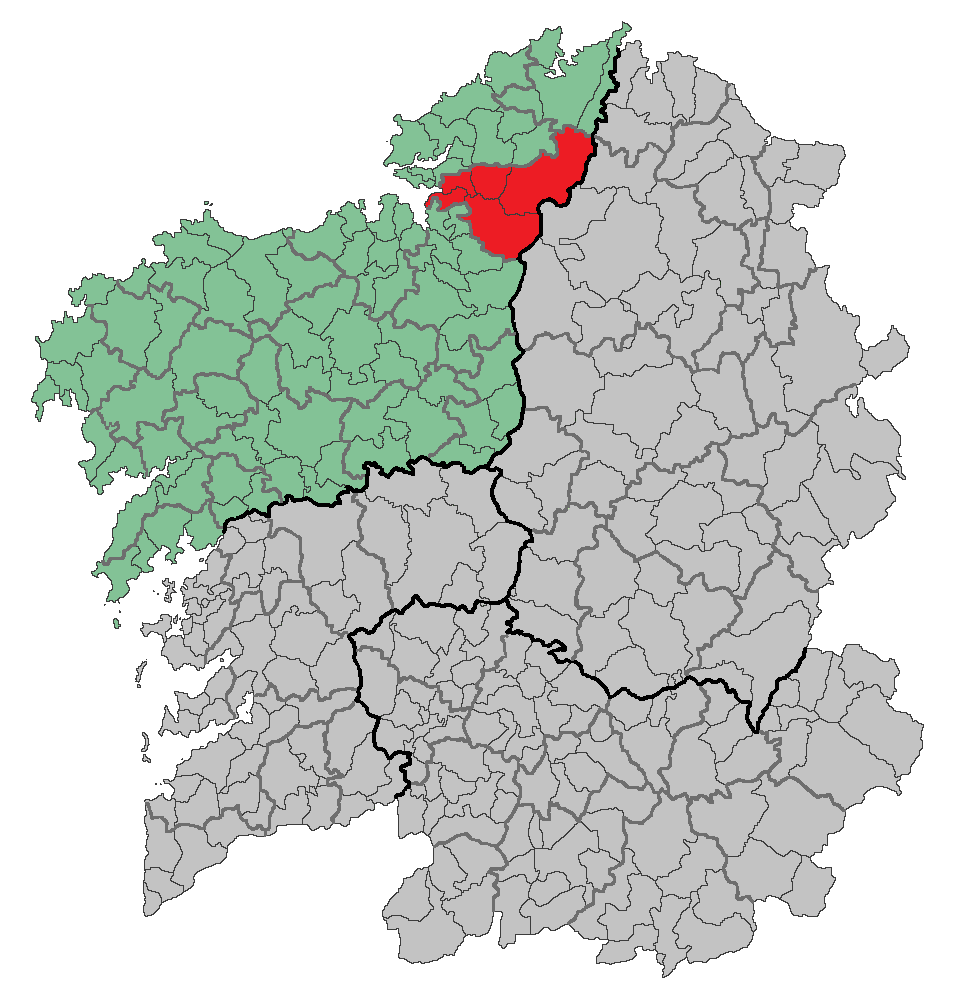
- Country: Spain
- Autonomous community: Galicia
- Province: A Coruña
- Capital: Pontedeume
- Municipalities: List: Cabañas, A Capela, Monfero, Pontedeume, As Pontes de García Rodríguez

Area
  - Total: 538.7 km^{2} (208.0 sq mi)

Population (2018)
  - Total: 24,629
  - Density: 45.72/km^{2} (118.4/sq mi)
- Demonym: Eumés
- Time zone: UTC+1 (CET)
  - Summer (DST): UTC+2 (CEST)

O Eume is a comarca in the province of A Coruña, Galicia, Spain. Its capital is the municipality of Pontedeume. It contains five municipalities and 24,629 inhabitants in an area of 538.7 km^{2}.

== Municipalities ==
The five municipalities within the comarca are as follows, listed below with their areas and populations:

Name	Area (km^{2})	Population (2001)	Population (2011)	Population (2018)
Cabanas	30.3	3,354	3,297	3,318
A Capela	58.0	1,530	1,373	1,238
Monfero	171.7	2,562	2,139	1,952
Pontedeume	29.3	8,696	8,305	7,884
As Pontes de García Rodríguez	249.4	12,097	11,021	10,237
Totals	538.7	28,239	26,135	24,629

== See also ==
- Comarcas of Spain
- Galicia (Spain)
