= Kapel =

Kapel can refer to:

- a kippah
- Kapel, Gelderland, Netherlands
- Kapel, North Holland, Netherlands
