= Capelle (disambiguation) =

Capelle is now part of Sprang-Capelle, in North Brabant, Netherlands.

Capelle (from Picard or from occitan capèla, meaning chapel) may also refer to:

== Places ==
- Capelle, now Kapelle (Schouwen-Duiveland), a drowned village in Zeeland, Netherlands
- Capelle aan den IJssel, town and municipality bordering Rotterdam in South Holland, Netherlands
- Capelle, Nord, in the Nord department, France
- La Capelle, a commune in the Aisne department, France

== Other uses ==
- VV Capelle, a Dutch football team
- a variant spelling of kapelle, a musical orchestra or choir

== People with the surname ==
- André Capelle (1891–1972), French cyclist
- Donald Capelle, Marshallese politician
- Eduard von Capelle (1855–1931), German Imperial Navy officer
- Jean Capelle (footballer) (1913–1977), Belgian football player
- Jean Capelle (politician) (1909–1983), French politician

== See also ==
- Kapelle (disambiguation)
- Capel (disambiguation)
- Cappel (disambiguation)
