= Capelle en Botland =

Capelle en Botland (51°39′N 3°58′E) is a short-lived municipality in the Dutch province of Zeeland. It existed until 1813, when it was annexed by the municipality of Nieuwerkerk.

The municipality covered the hamlet of Capelle (now called Kapelle), with a few scattered farms around it; an area with a population of 140 around 1850.,
