= Monastery of San Xoán de Caaveiro =

Monastery in Capela, Spain

Coordinates: 43°25′03″N 08°04′06″W

- Mosteiro de San Xoán de Caaveiro
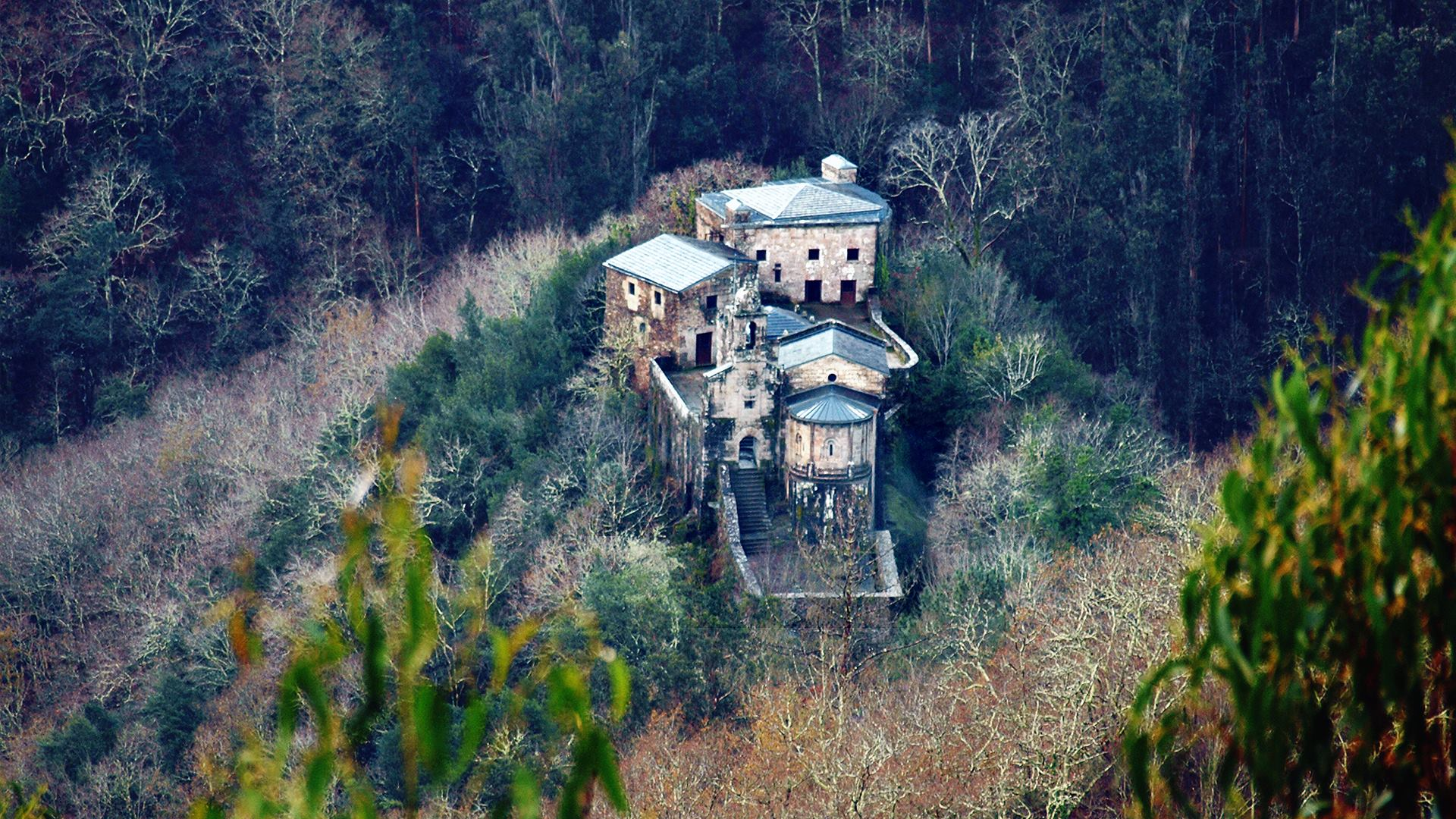
- Aerial view of the monastery, within the Fragas do Eume Natural Park.

Location
- Location: A Capela, Galicia, Spain
- Interactive map of Monastery of San Xoán de Caaveiro

Architecture
- Style: Romanesque, Baroque

The Monastery of San Xoán de Caaveiro (Galician: Mosteiro de San Xoán de Caaveiro) is a Galician monastery founded in the tenth century by Saint Rudesind. It is situated in A Capela, in Galicia, within the Fragas do Eume natural park.
