= Cabanas, A Coruña =

Cabanas Cabañas
- Municipality of Spain
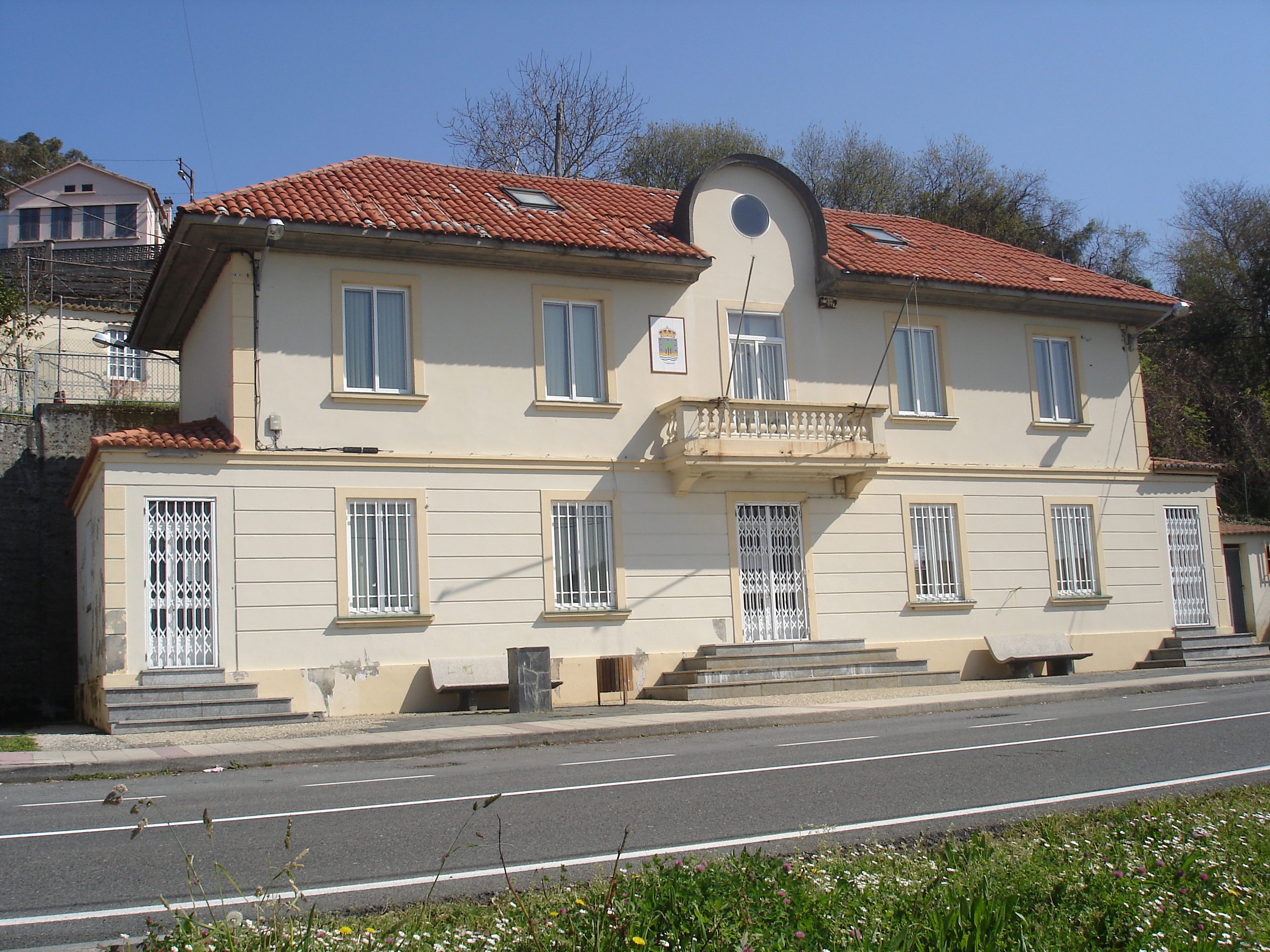
- The town's City Hall

- Coat of arms

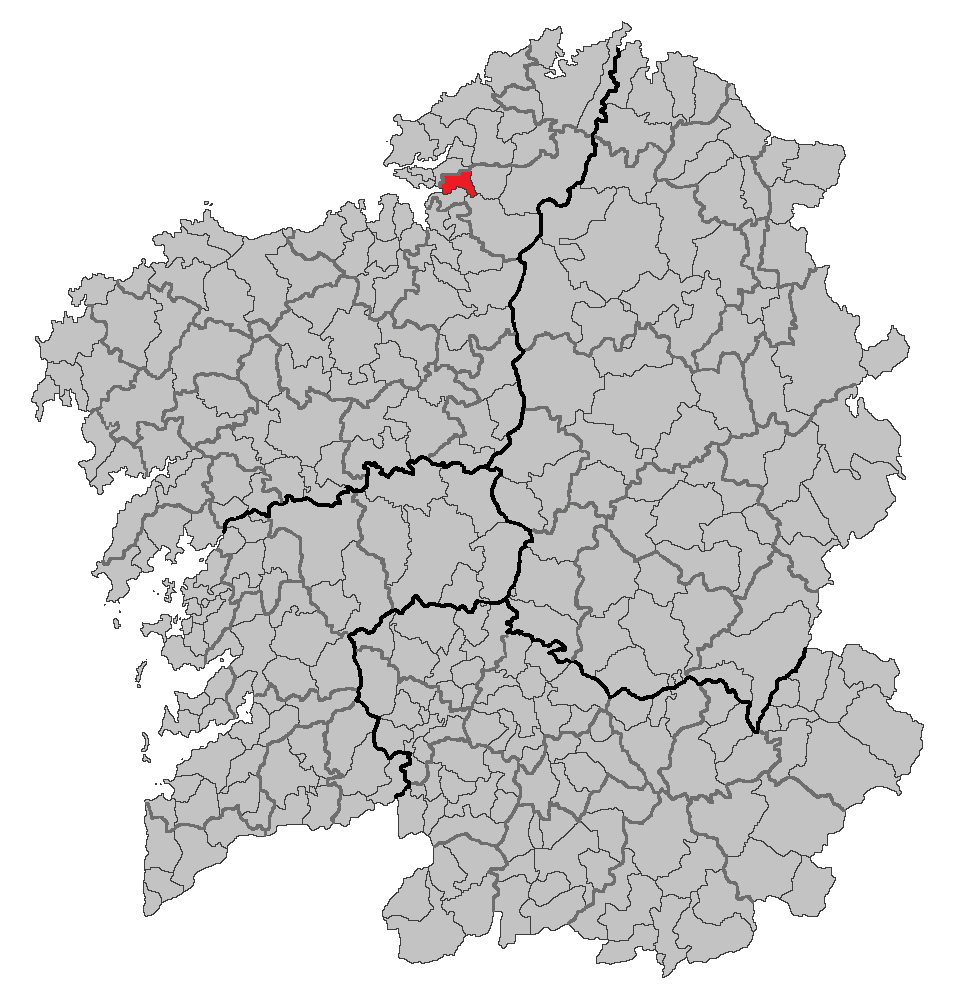
- Location of the municipal area in Galicia.

- Location in Spain
- Coordinates: 43°25′10″N 08°9′41″W
- Country: Spain
- Autonomous community: Galicia
- Province: A Coruña
- Comarca: Eume

Government
  - Mayor: Germán Castrillón

Area
  - Total: 30.32 km^{2} (11.71 sq mi)

Population (2025-01-01)
  - Total: 3,287
  - Density: 108.4/km^{2} (280.8/sq mi)
- Time zone: UTC+1 (CET)
  - Summer (DST): UTC+2 (CEST)
- Website: Official website

Cabanas (in Spanish, Cabañas) is a municipality in the province of A Coruña in the autonomous community of Galicia in northwestern Spain. It is 37 kilometers from A Coruña, in the lower valley of the Eume River, just before its mouth at the Ares estuary. It borders the municipalities of A Capela and Fene.

Cabanas was founded by the Counts of Traba in the eleventh century.

== Geography ==
=== Parishes ===
Cabanas is divided into 7 parishes:

- Cabañas (in Galician, Cabanas) (San Andrés)
- Eirines (San Esteban)
- Laraje (in Galician, Laraxe) (San Mamed)
- Porto (San Martín)
- Regüela
- Salto (Santa Cruz)
- Soaserra (Santa Eulalia)

=== Situation ===
The municipality of Cabañas is located on the Galician coast, in the northeast of the province of A Coruña. It's the only municipality entirely within the Ares estuary. Part of the O Eume Region, it borders the municipality of Fene to the north and west, the municipality of A Capela to the east, and the Ares estuary and the municipalities of Puentedeume (Pontedeume) and Monfero to the south, from which it is separated by the Eume River. The municipal capital is 82 kilometers from Santiago de Compostela, 37 from A Coruña, and 15 from Ferrol.

=== Hydrography ===
The main river is the Eume, which flows through the southern part of the municipality and forms the border with the municipalities of Monfero and Pontedeume. To the east, in the parish of Soaserra, it is located in the Eume canyon, the valley widening in the parish of Iris, and forming a wide estuary shortly before its mouth in the parish of Cabañas. Except for a small stream that flows swiftly through the canyon, it has no tributaries within the county.

== Economy ==
The major sectors are tourism (from the 1950s and in particular from the early 1970s), farming, agriculture and services, though tourism is predominantly seasonal, concentrating itself predominantly in the summer months.

== See also ==
List of municipalities in A Coruña
