= Kapel, North Holland =

Dutch hamlet

Coordinates: 52°35′0″N 4°41′35″E

Kapel is a hamlet in the Dutch province of North Holland. It is located in the municipality of Heiloo, about 2 km south of Heiloo itself.

The hamlet is named after the chapel of "Onze Lieve Vrouwe ter Nood", a pilgrimage site since 1409. Formerly, it was also known as Oesdom.
