= Cappel =

Cappel may refer to:

- Cappel, Moselle, a commune in Lorraine, France
- Cappel, Lower Saxony, a municipality in Lower Saxony, Germany
- Cappel, Marburg
- the Cappel family, French 15th-17th century jurists and theologians

== See also ==
- Kappel
