= Capela Real of Rio de Janeiro =

The Capela Real do Rio de Janeiro was the musical establishment of the Portuguese royal court in Rio de Janeiro, Brazil, from 1808, marking a new phase in the development of music of Brazil.

The capela (or "chapel") was instituted in the Rio de Janeiro Cathedral. Various musicians and composers were employed by the court capela including José Maurício Nunes Garcia.
