= Carlo Alberto Capella =

Italian priest and Vatican diplomat

Monsignor Carlo Alberto Capella
- Church: Catholic Church

Orders
- Ordination: 1993 by Carlo Maria Martini

Personal details
- Born: July 1967 (age 58) Carpi, Emilia-Romagna, Italy
- Denomination: Roman Catholic
- Criminal charges: Possession and distribution of child pornography
- Criminal penalty: 5 years in prison and €5,000 fine
- Criminal status: Released

Carlo Alberto Capella is an Italian Catholic priest and Vatican diplomat who was convicted by a Vatican tribunal of possessing and sharing child pornography in 2018. He is one of the few people who have served a prison sentence in the Vatican jail.

== Biography ==
Born in Carpi, Italy, in July 1967, he was ordained a priest in 1993 for the Archdiocese of Milan. After studies of canon law he entered the Vatican diplomatic corps. He was assigned to the papal nunciature in India in 2003 and to the nunciature in Hong Kong in 2007. In 2008, he was made a Chaplain of His Holiness, which entitled him to the title of monsignor. In 2011 he was transferred to the Vatican to serve in the Secretariat of State. In 2016 he was assigned to the nunciature to the United States.

=== Conviction ===
In 2017, Capella was recalled to the Vatican by Pope Francis after United States officials informed the Vatican that he was under investigation for possession and sharing of child pornography. Shortly thereafter, Canada issued a warrant for his arrest, alleging that during a visit to Canada in December 2016 he had possessed and shared child pornography. As a diplomat, he was immune from prosecution in the United States.

In 2018, Capella was convicted and sentenced to five years in prison, which he served in the Vatican jail. In a separate canonical trial, he lost the title of Monsignor but was not laicized. As of 2021, he was allowed out during the day to work in an office that handles papal blessings. In 2023, following the end of his prison sentence, Capella was permitted to return to work in the Vatican Secretariat of State.

Of his crimes, Capella has said: "Mistakes I have made are evident as well as this period of weakness. I am sorry that my weakness has hurt the church, the Holy See, and my diocese. I also hurt my family, and I am repentant." Calling his possession and distribution of child pornography "a bump in the road in my priestly life," Capella said he wanted to continue receiving "psychological support."
