= A Capela =

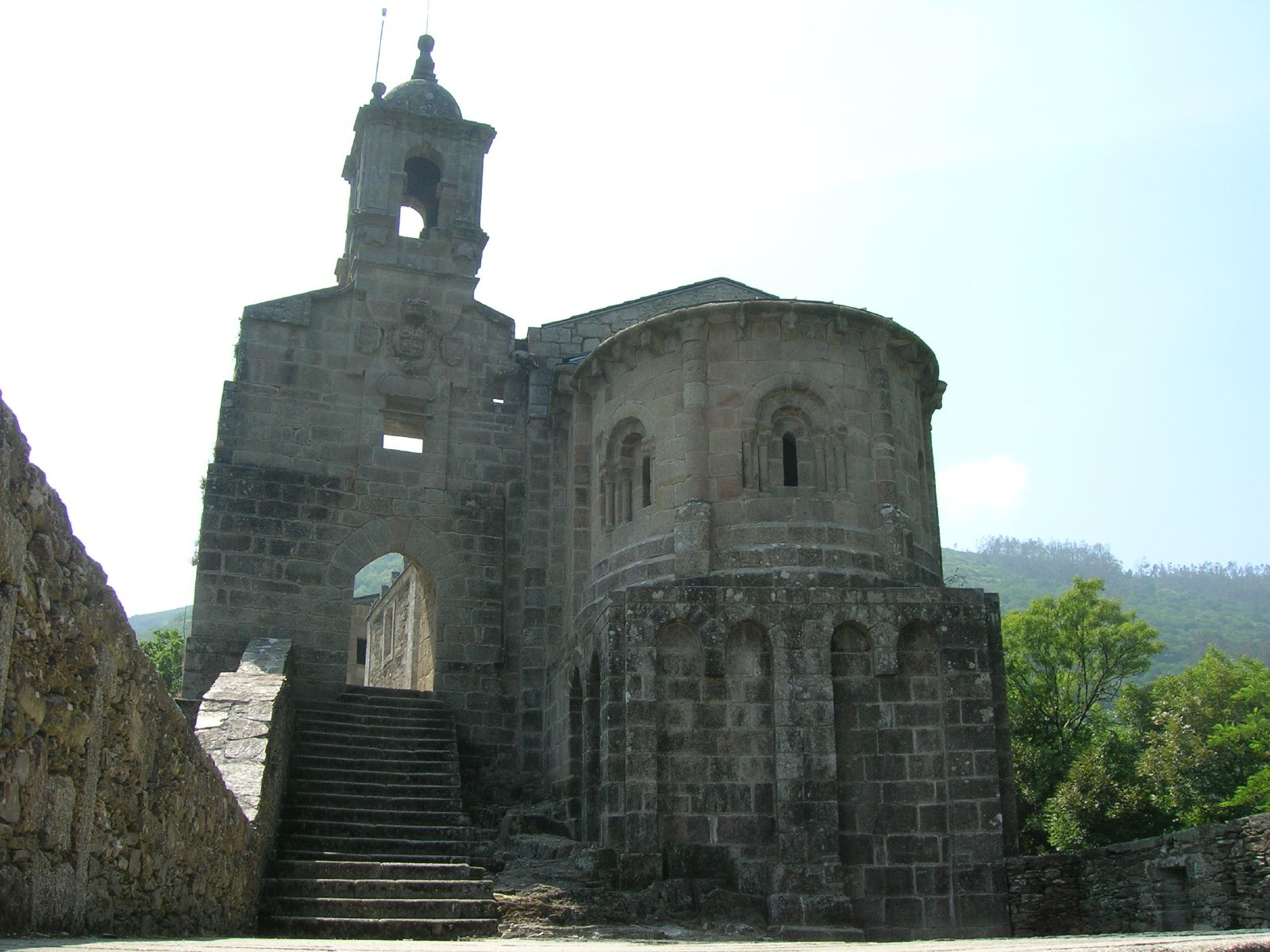
- Monastery of San Xoán de Caaveiro.

- Coat of arms

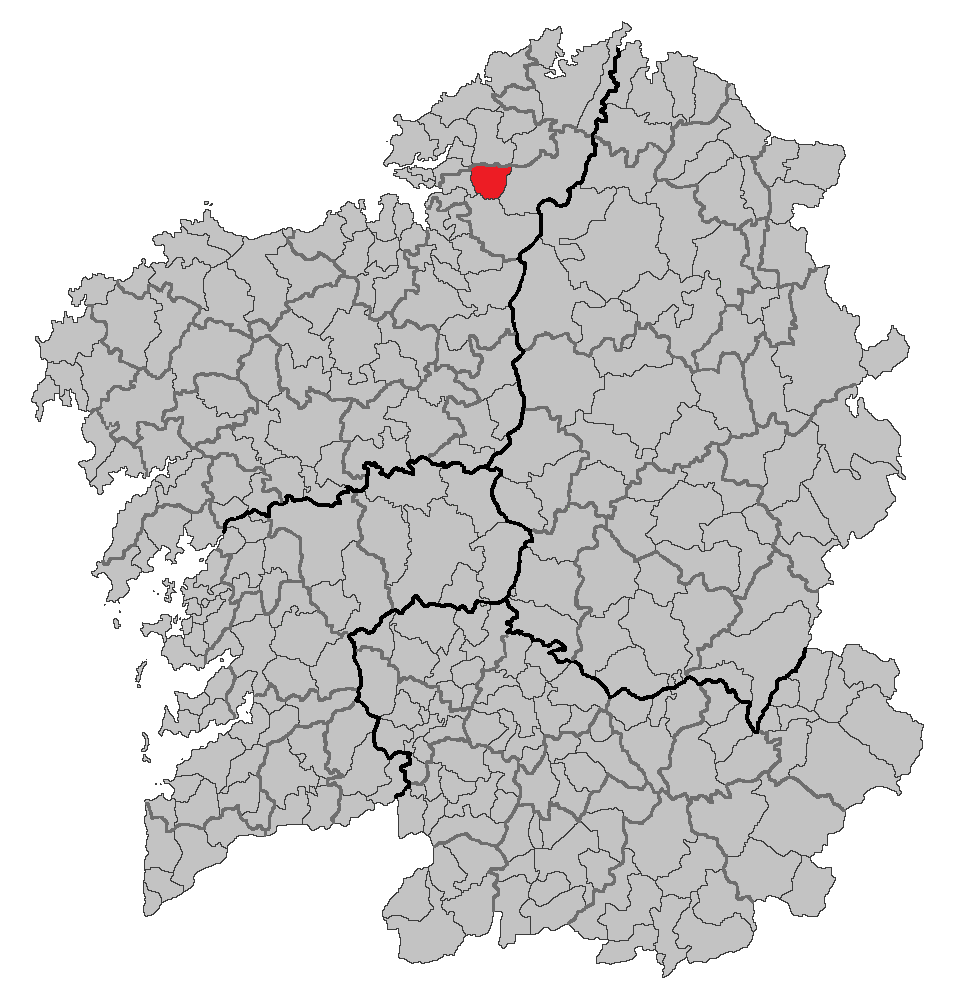
- Location of the municipal area in Galicia.

- Location in Spain.
- Coordinates: 43°35′9.24″N 7°46′14.23″W
- Country: Spain
- Autonomous community: Galicia
- Province: A Coruña
- Comarca: Eume

Government
  - Mayor: Manuel Meizoso López (Socialst Party of Galicia (PSdG PSOE))

Area
  - Total: 58 km^{2} (22 sq mi)

Population (2025-01-01)
  - Total: 1,165
  - Density: 20/km^{2} (52/sq mi)
- Time zone: UTC+1 (CET)
  - Summer (DST): UTC+2 (CEST)
- Postal code: 15613
- Website: Official website

A Capela is a municipality in the province of A Coruña in the autonomous community of Galicia in north-western Spain. It is located in the comarca of Eume. It has a population of 1,238 inhabitants (INE, 2018) and a population density of 24.81 inhabitants per square kilometer.

== Geography ==
=== Localization ===
A Capela is located midway between Puentedeume (12 km), Ferrol (17 km), and As Puentes de García Rodríguez (20 km). It is well-connected by the local road LC-141, which links Cabañas and Puentes, and by the AC-121 between Filgueiras and El Rojal, in addition to having an extensive network of municipal roads connecting each of the town's villages. From Ferrol, A Coruña, Santiago de Compostela, and Lugo, it is easily accessible via the AP-9 freeway, which connects it to Puentedeume from the aforementioned LC-141.

The municipality is bordered to the north by San Saturnino, to the south by Monfero, to the east by Puentes de García Rodríguez and to the west by Cabañas.

=== Physical ===
Its area is 59 km^{2}, and a density of 24.81 inhabitants per square kilometer.

It has an average altitude of 450 m and is crossed by the Eume and Belelle valleys. The Fragas do Eume Natural Park is located in the Eume valley. The Belelle River flows down from the Forgoselo mountain range and crosses the municipality from east to west.

=== Parishes ===
Parishes that are part of the municipality:

- Caaveiro (San Braulio)
- Cabalar (Santa María)
- Capela (Santiago)

== Demography ==
A Capela has a population of 1165 inhabitants (INE 2025).

Historical population

Year	Pop.	±%
1842	3,253	—
1857	3,432	+5.5%
1860	3,464	+0.9%
1877	3,423	−1.2%
1887	3,570	+4.3%
1897	3,728	+4.4%
1900	4,011	+7.6%
1910	4,290	+7.0%
1920	8,395	+95.7%
1930	4,858	−42.1%

Year	Pop.	±%
1940	4,842	−0.3%
1950	4,796	−1.0%
1960	4,752	−0.9%
1900	4,153	−12.6%
1981	3,244	−21.9%
1991	1,741	−46.3%
2001	1,530	−12.1%
2011	1,373	−10.3%
2021	1,241	−9.6%

INE Archive

== See also ==
- Fragas do Eume
- List of municipalities in A Coruña
