= USS Capella =

USS Capella may refer to the following ships of the United States Navy:

- USS Capella (AK-13), built in 1920 as the Comerant by American International Shipbuilding
- USNS Capella (T-AKR 293), a vehicle cargo ship launched on 1 September 1972
