= Kapel, Gelderland =

Kapel
- Hamlet
- Location in the Netherlands Kapel (Netherlands)
- Coordinates: 51°53′3″N 5°58′35″E
- Country: Netherlands
- Province: Gelderland
- Municipality: Lingewaard
- Elevation: 11 m (36 ft)
- Time zone: UTC+1 (CET)
  - Summer (DST): UTC+2 (CEST)
- Postal code: 6691
- Dialing code: 0481

Kapel is a hamlet in the Dutch province of Gelderland. It is located in the municipality of Lingewaard, about 1 km north of the town of Gendt.

It was first mentioned in 1840 as Capel, and means chapel, i.e. church without an independent parish. Kapel is not a statistical entity, and the postal authorities have placed it under Gendt. In 1840, it was home to 206 people. Nowadays, it consists of about 45 houses.
