= Cappel, Marburg =

Cappel
- Borough of Marburg
- Coat of arms

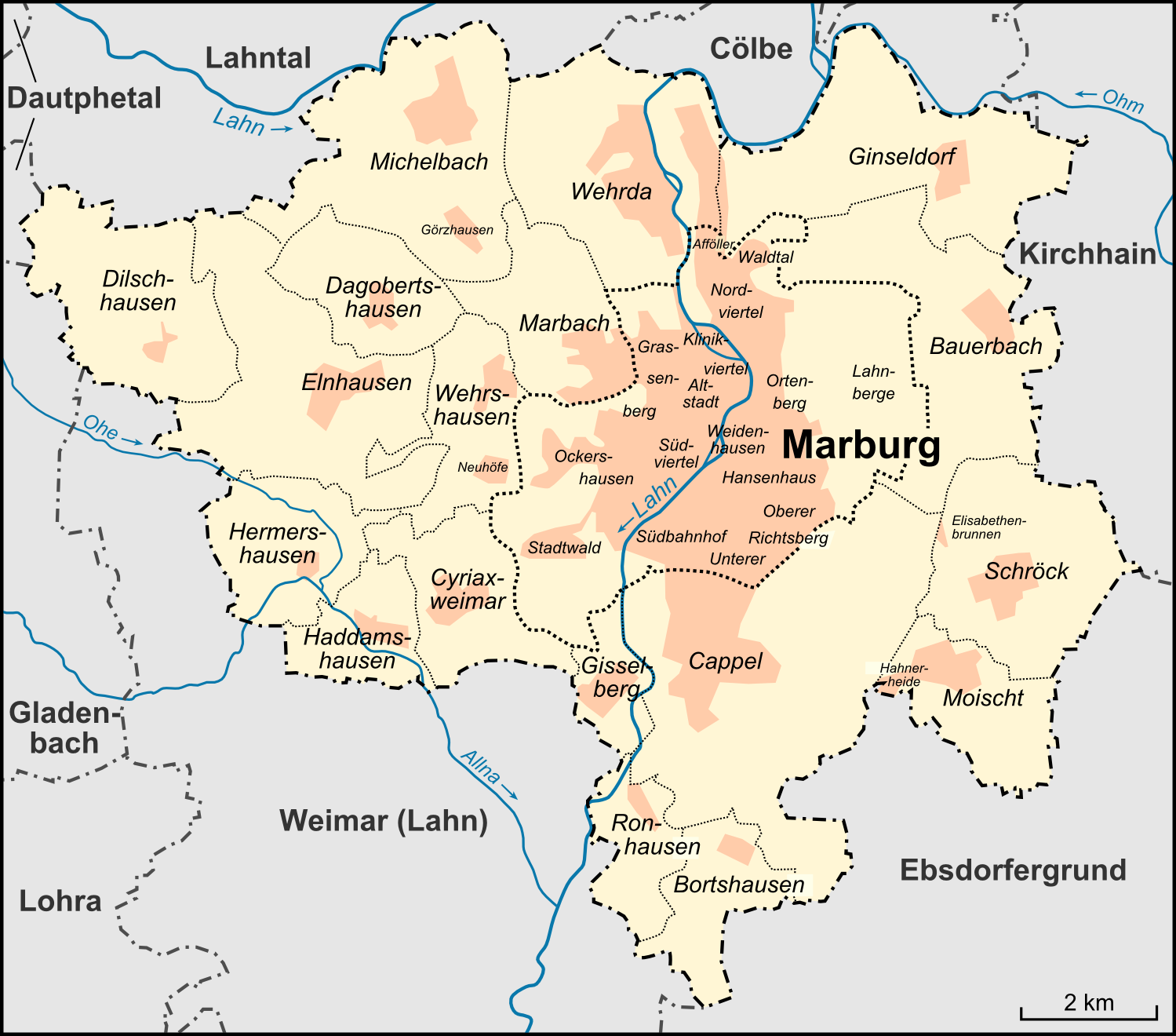
- Stadtteile of Marburg
- Interactive map of Cappel
- Location within Germany Location within Hesse
- Coordinates: 50°47′N 8°46′E
- Country: Germany
- State: Hesse
- District: Marburg-Biedenkopf
- City: Marburg

Area
  - Total: 14.85 km^{2} (5.73 sq mi)
- Elevation: 210 m (690 ft)

Population (2019-12-31)
  - Total: 6,780
  - Density: 457/km^{2} (1,180/sq mi)
- Time zone: UTC+01:00 (CET)
  - Summer (DST): UTC+02:00 (CEST)
- Postal codes: 35043
- Dialling codes: 06421

Cappel (German pronunciation: [ˈkapl̩]) is a borough (Ortsbezirk) of Marburg in Hesse.

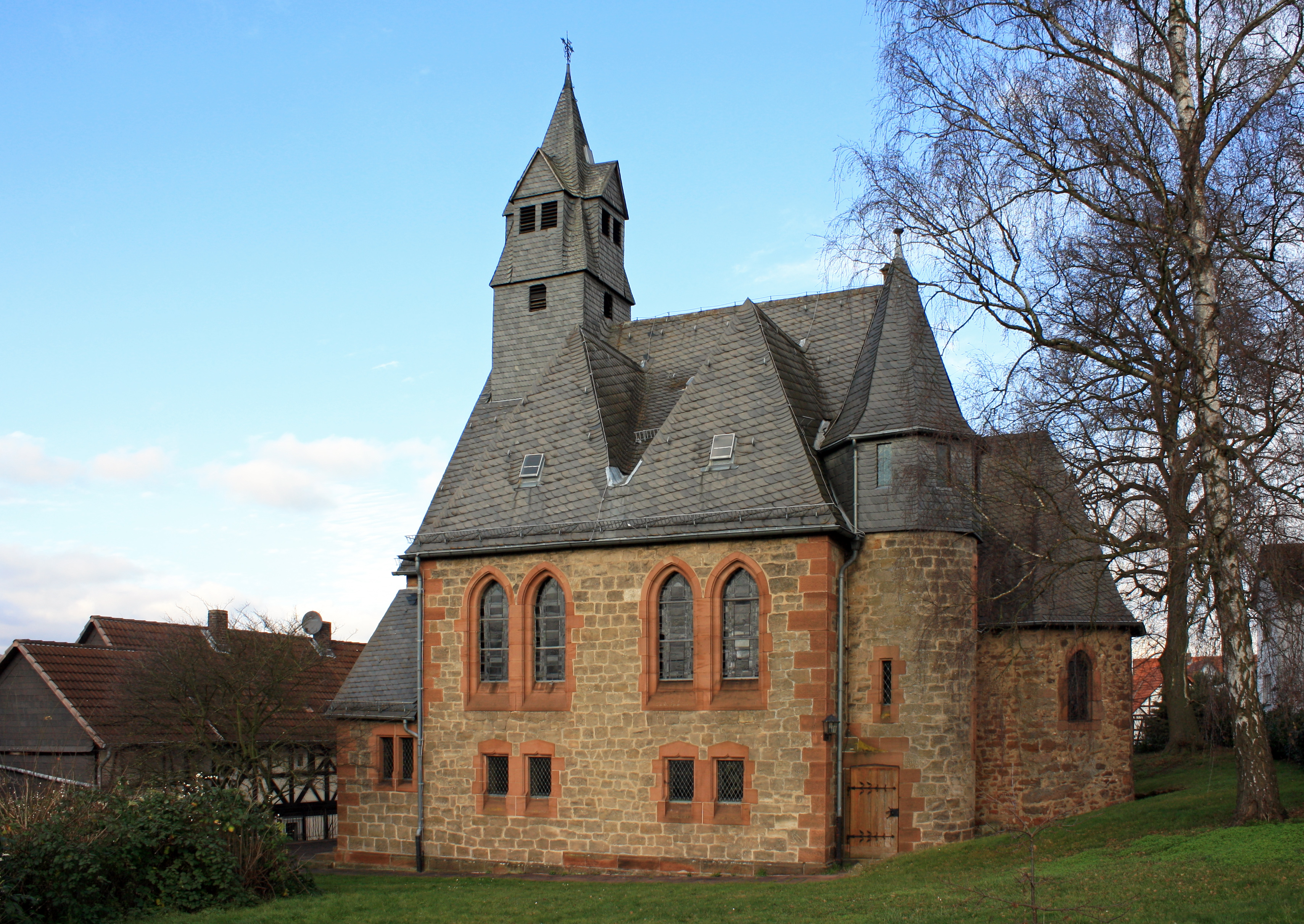
Church

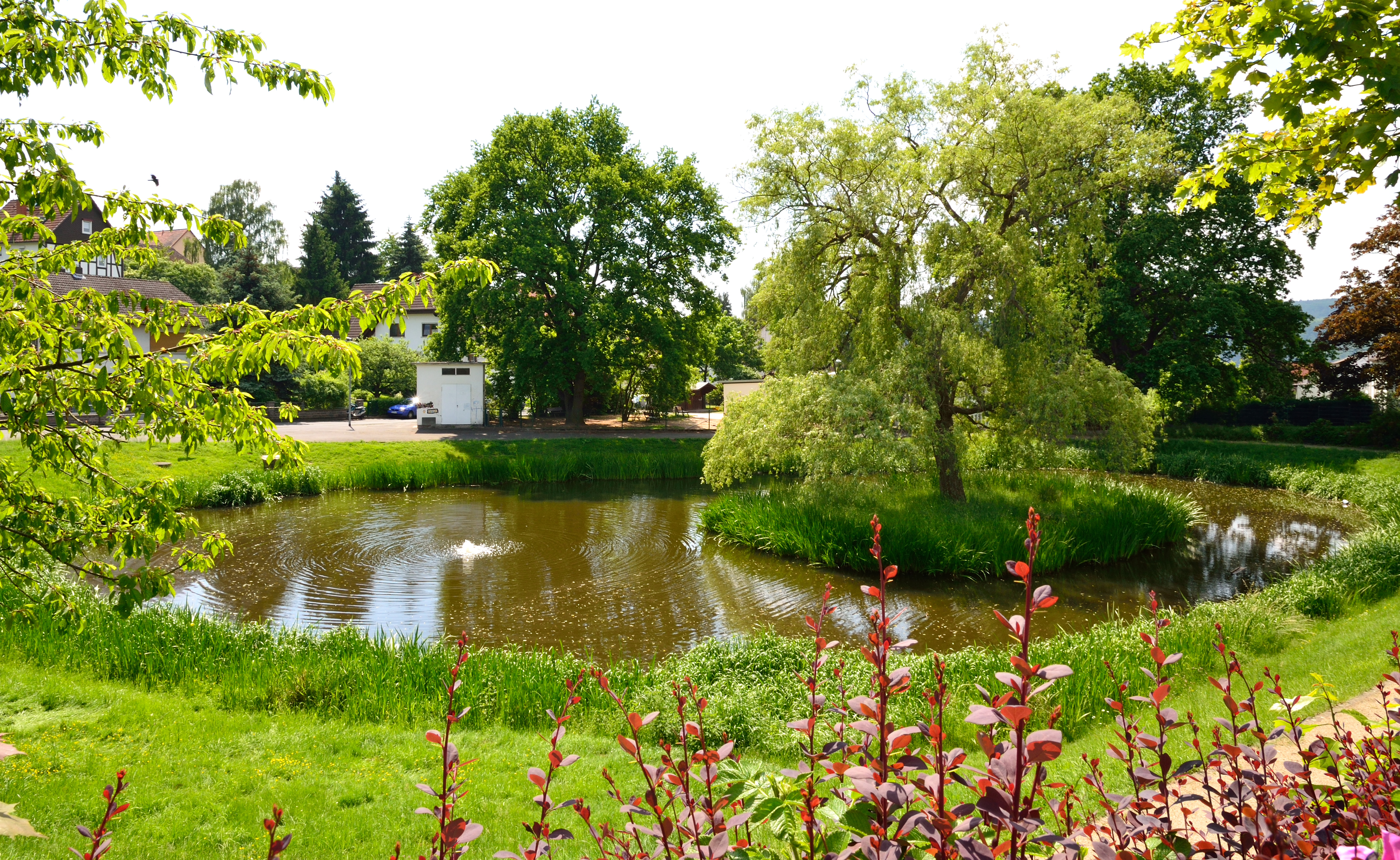
Pond
