= As Pontes de García Rodríguez =

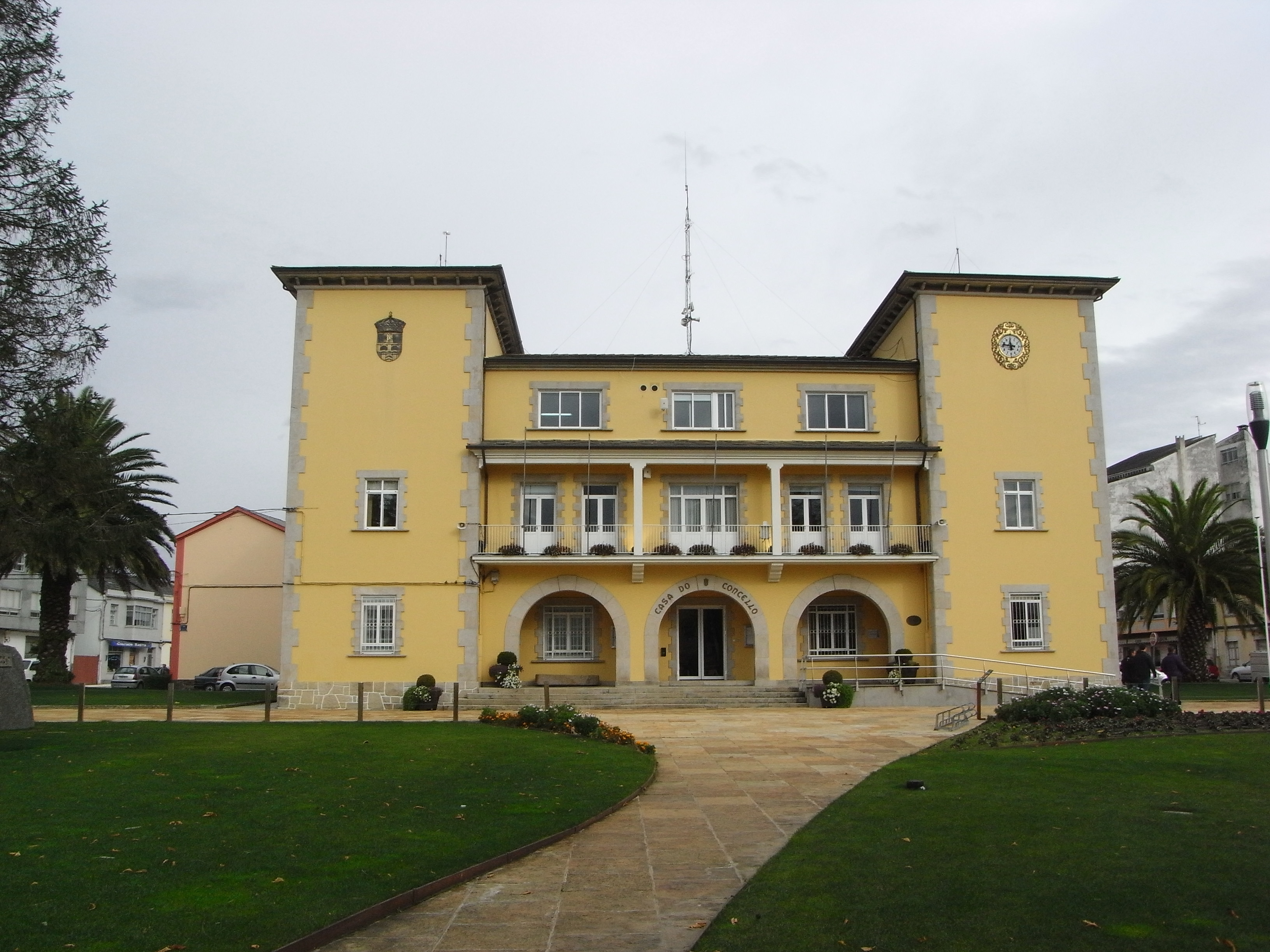
- Town hall.

- Flag Coat of arms

- Location in Spain.
- Coordinates: 43°27′N 7°50′W
- Country: Spain
- Autonomous community: Galicia
- Province: A Coruña
- Comarca: Eume

Government
  - Mayor: Valentín González Formoso

Area
  - Total: 249.4 km^{2} (96.3 sq mi)

Population (2025-01-01)
  - Total: 9,796
  - Density: 39.28/km^{2} (101.7/sq mi)
- Demonym(s): pontés, -a
- Website: Official website

As Pontes de García Rodríguez is a municipality in the northwest of the province of A Coruña, in the autonomous community of Galicia, Spain. It belongs to the comarca of Eume. It is the largest municipality in the province and it has a population of 11,139 inhabitants (INE, 2011).

== Economy ==
The town's economy depends primarily on industry.

The town's main employer is the natural gas power plant run by Endesa. This plant is the largest in Spain and its chimney is the highest structure in the country at 365 meters and the second tallest tower in Europe. The municipality has numerous wind farms and the town itself has three industrial parks.

== Nature and tourism ==
The "Fragas" of the River Eume Natural Park is home to a typical Atlantic Forest landscape. It was declared a Natural park in 1997.

== Notable people ==
- Ignacio Echeverría - Spanish lawyer and banker, known for fighting against terrorists during the 2017 London Bridge attack
- Miguel Alvariño - Galician athlete
- Sabela Ramil - Galician singer-songwriter, known for participating in the Spanish talent show Operación Triunfo
- Valentín González Formoso - Galician politician of the Socialists' Party of Galicia

== International relations ==
=== Twin towns – sister cities ===
As Pontes de García Rodríguez is twinned with:

- Arroyo Naranjo, La Havana, Cuba
- Lesneven, Brittany, France
- Carmarthen, Wales, United Kingdom

== Gallery ==
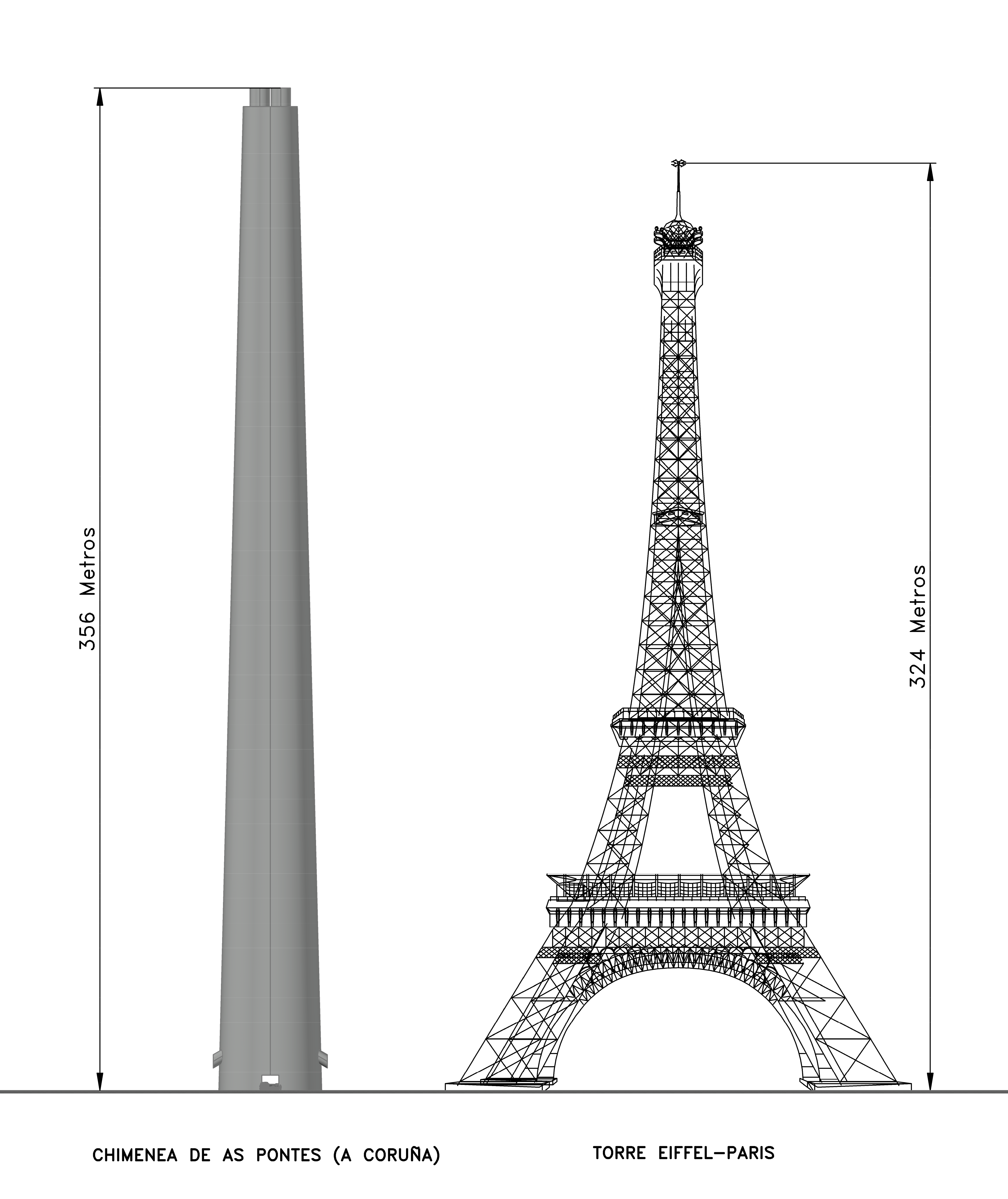
Chimney of the As Pontes power plant, Spain. Comparison with the Eiffel Tower in Paris

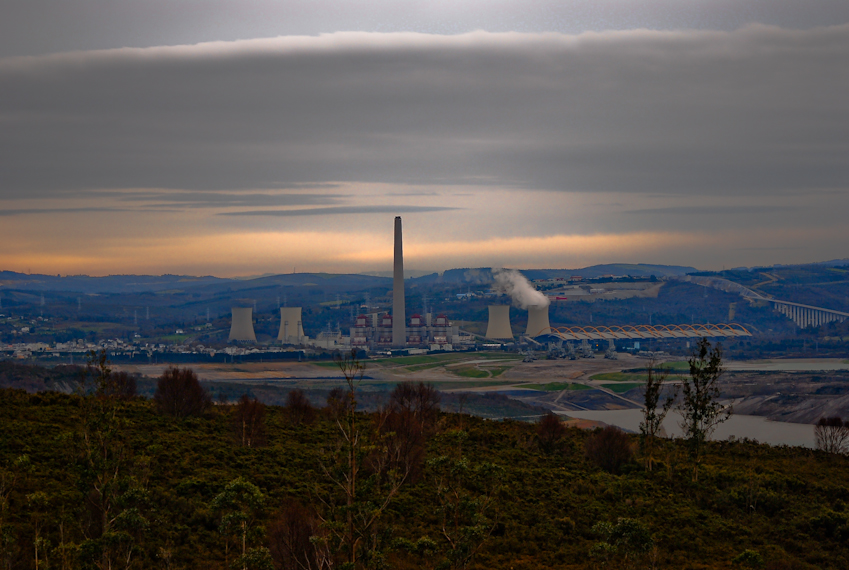
Endesa coal power plant

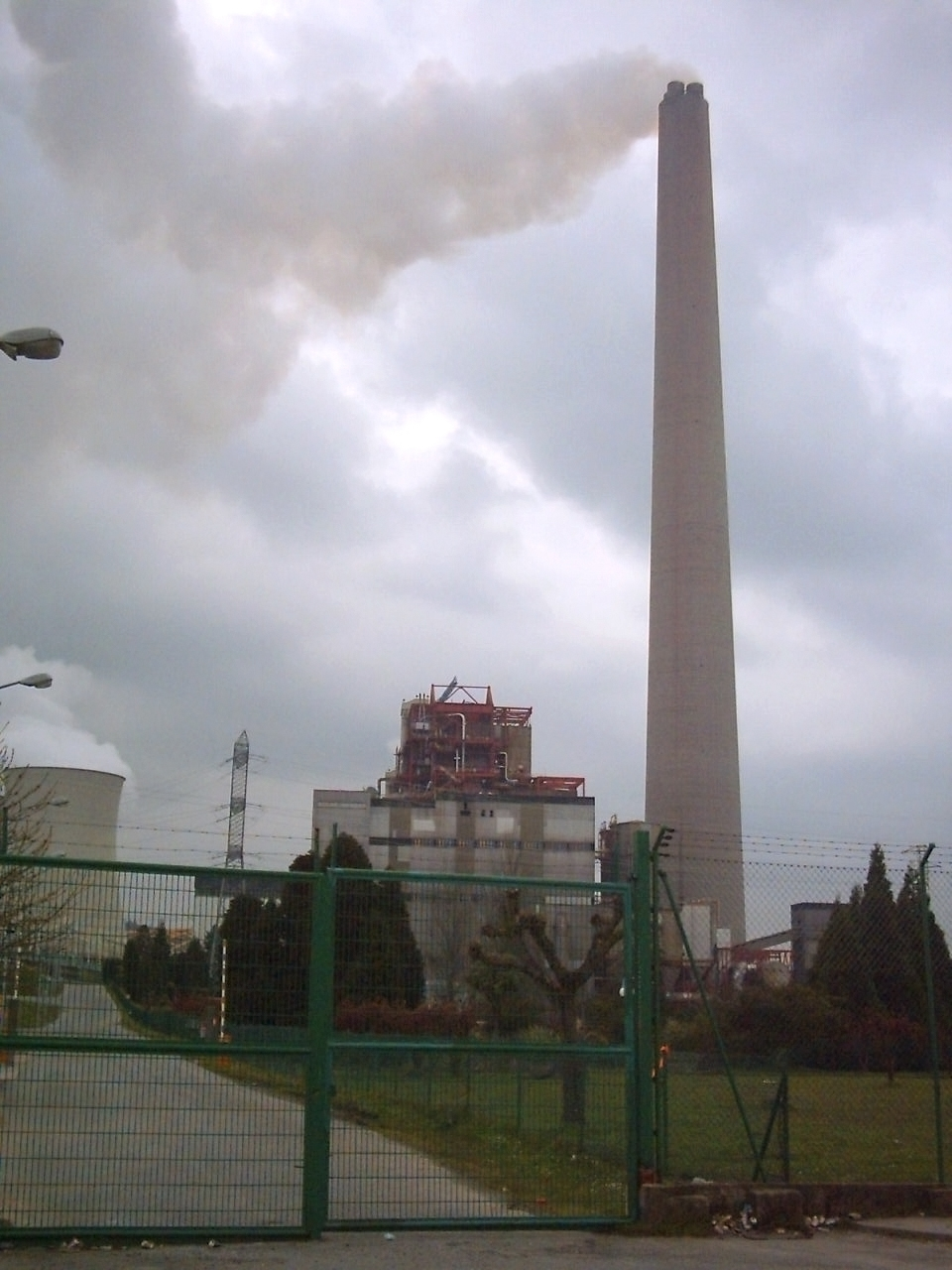
The Endesa chimney

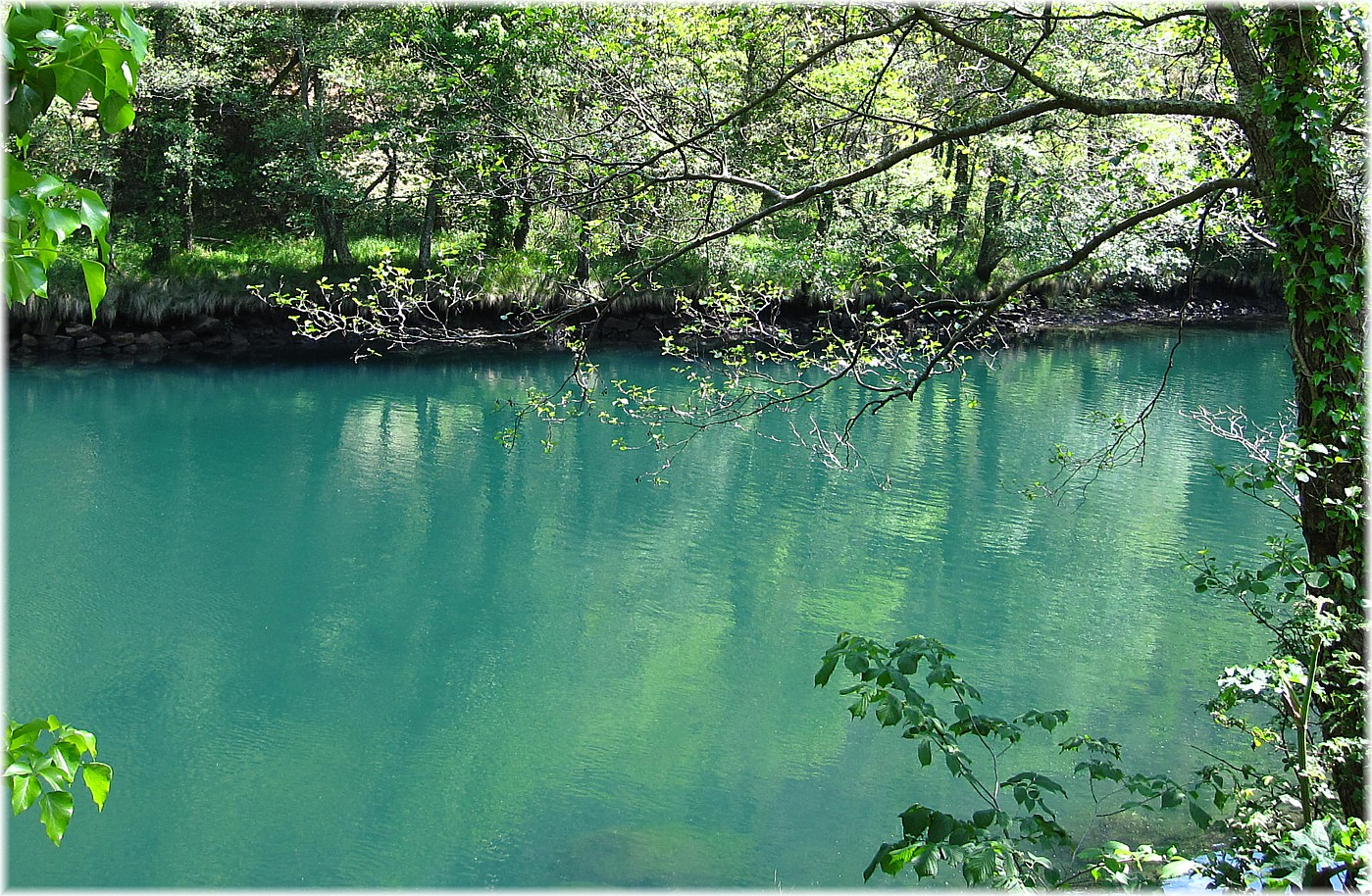
Fragas do Eume

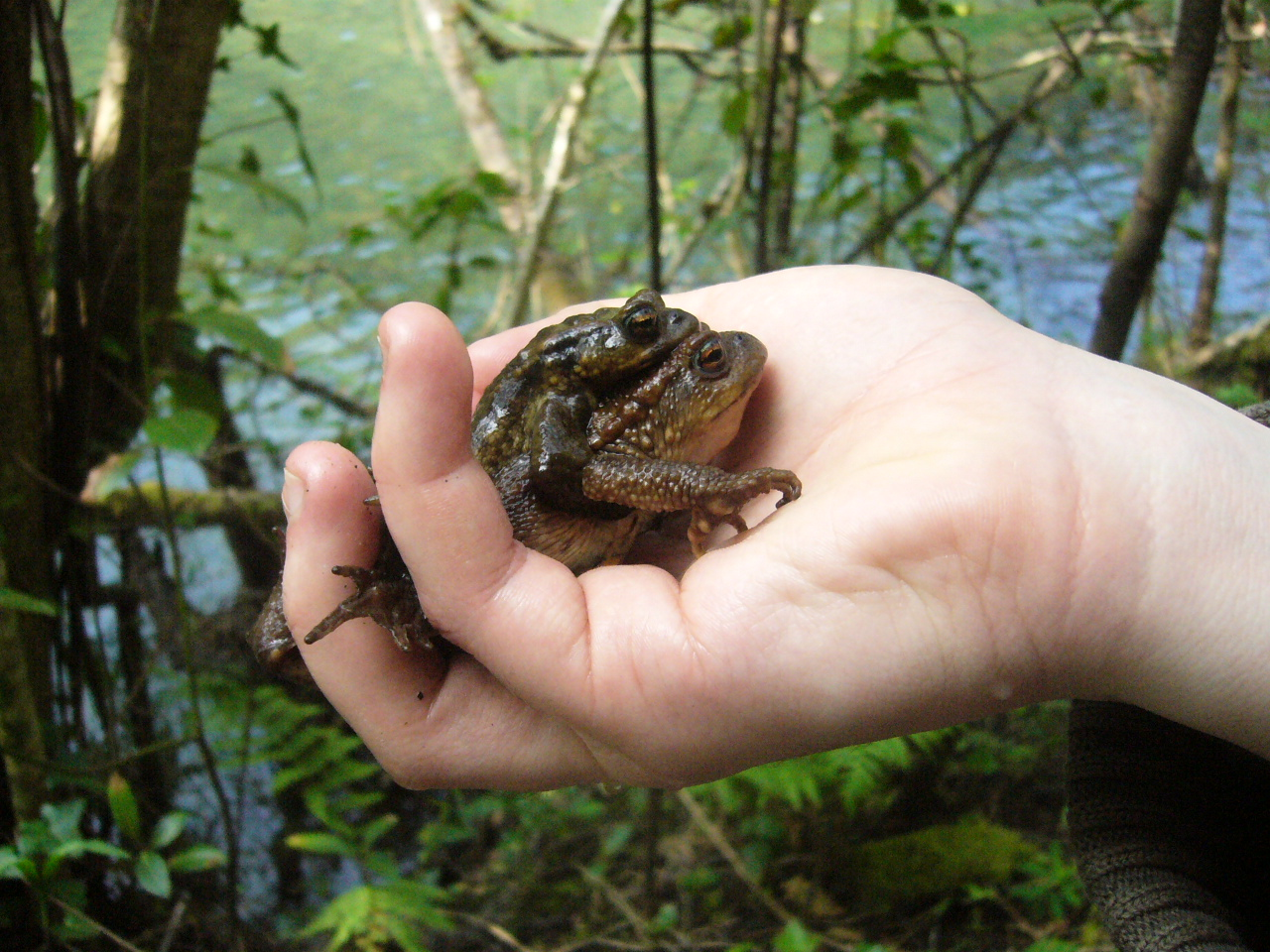
Amplexus or Bufo bufo in the "Fragas" of the River Eume Natural Park

== See also ==
List of municipalities in A Coruña
