= Kappel =

Kappel, Käppel or Kaeppel may refer to:

== Places ==
=== Switzerland ===
- Kappel, Switzerland, in the canton of Solothurn
- Kappel am Albis, in the canton of Zurich
  - Wars of Kappel, 16th century conflicts
- Ebnat-Kappel, in the canton of St. Gallen

=== Germany ===
- Kappel, Rhineland-Palatinate
- Kappel-Grafenhausen, in Baden-Württemberg
- Kappel, Lenzkirch, in Baden-Württemberg
- the Danish name for Kappeln, in Schleswig-Holstein

=== Other countries ===
- Kappel am Krappfeld, Austria

== People ==
- Barbara Kappel (born 1965), Austrian politician
- Carl Henry Kaeppel (1887–1946), Australian classicist
- Frederick Kappel (1902–1994), American businessman
- Gertrud Kappel, (1884–1971), German soprano
- Heinie Kappel (1863–1905), American baseball player
- Hubert Käppel (born 1951), German classical guitarist
- Hugh Kappel (1910–1982), American artist
- Joe Kappel (1857–1929), American baseball player
- Leandro Kappel (born 1989), Dutch footballer
- Niko Kappel (born 1995), German paralympic athlete
- Rudi Kappel (1926–1959), Surinamese pilot
- Sofia Kappel (born 1998), Swedish actress
- Vladimir Kappel (1883-1920), Russian general

== See also ==
- Kapell
- Kapel (disambiguation)
- Kappl
- Kapl
