= Kapelle, Schouwen-Duiveland =

Capelle
- Interactive map of Capelle
- Coordinates: 51°38′43″N 3°58′3″E
- Country: Netherlands
- Province: Zeeland
- Municipality: Schouwen-Duiveland

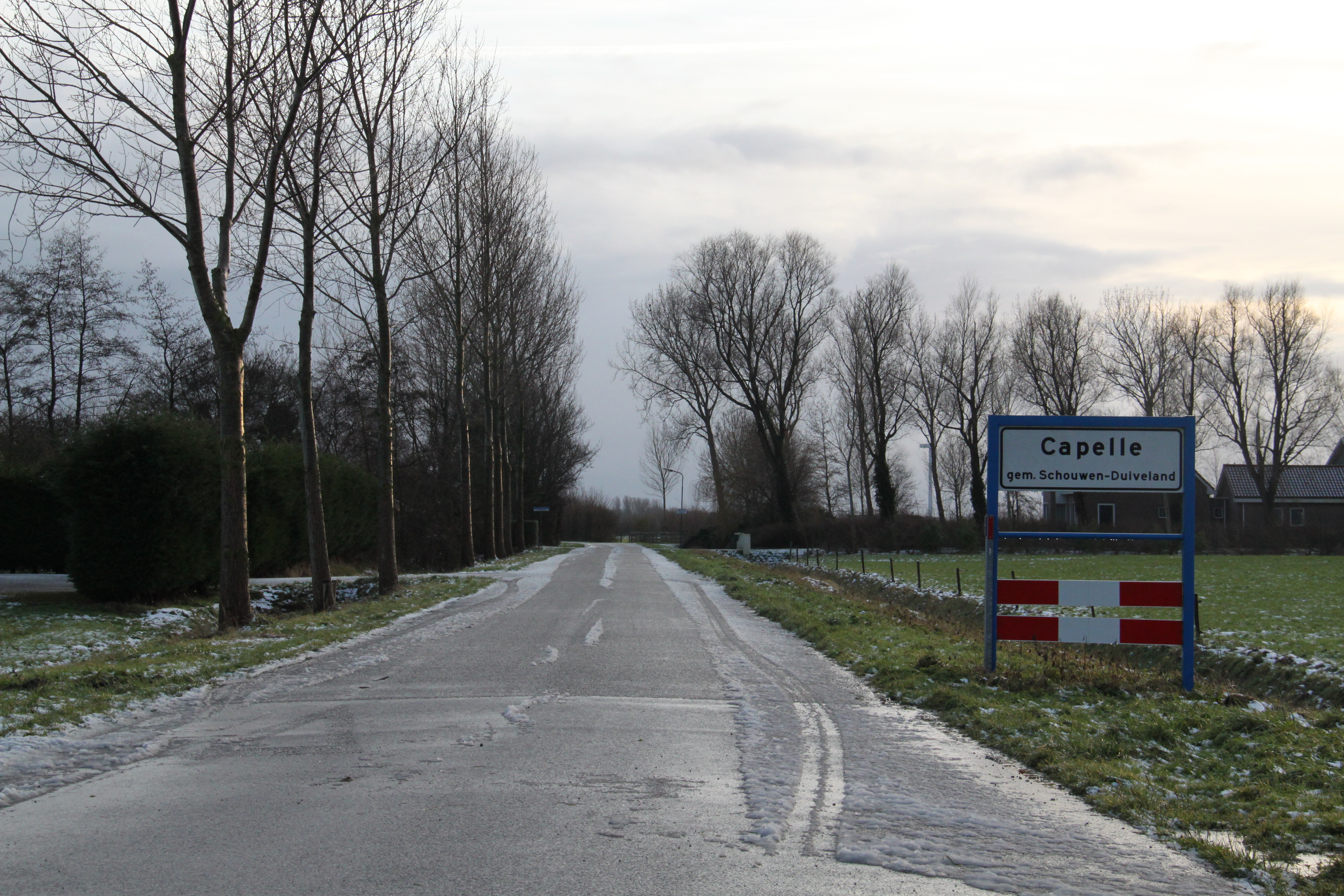
View of Capelle with place name sign.

Kapelle (formerly Capelle) is a hamlet in the Dutch province of Zeeland. It is located on the island of Schouwen-Duiveland, about 2 km west of Nieuwerkerk.

Until 1813, the hamlet was part of the separate municipality of Capelle en Botland. In 1953, Capelle had grown into a small village, with about 20 houses and a population of around 100, when it was almost completely destroyed in the North Sea flood of 1953. All houses except two were swept away, and 42 inhabitants died.

The village was not rebuilt; nowadays only a small hamlet remains, consisting of a number of farms.

Kapelle should not be confused with some other locations in Zeeland: the hamlet of Looperskapelle on Schouwen-Duiveland, about 12 km to the northwest, which was formerly also known as "Kapelle", and the much larger town of Kapelle on Zuid-Beveland.
