= Monfero =

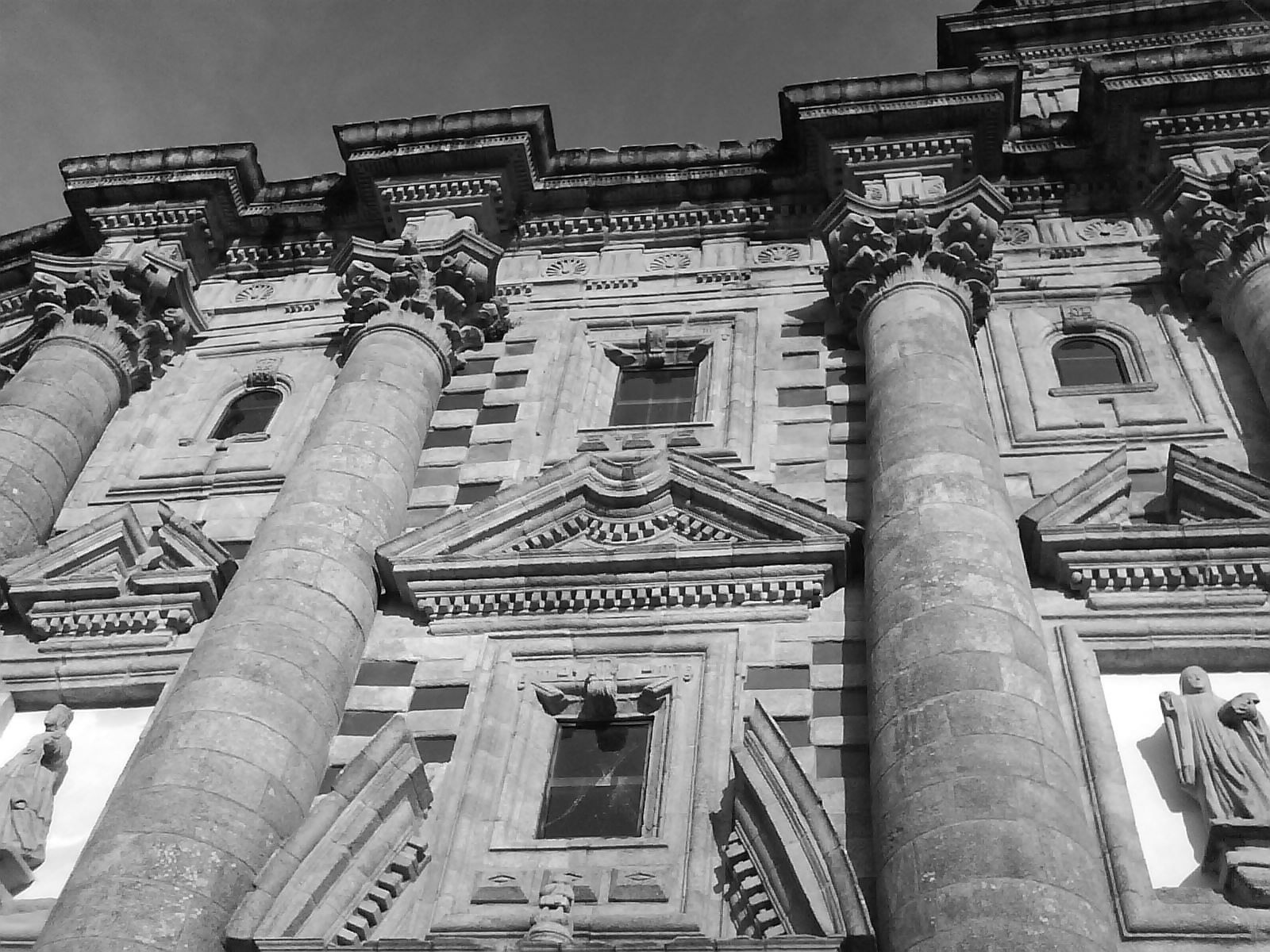
- Monfero Abbey.

- Flag Coat of arms

- Location in Spain
- Coordinates: 43°22′N 7°57′W
- Country: Spain
- Autonomous community: Galicia
- Province: A Coruña
- Comarca: Eume

Government
  - Mayor: Andrés Feal Varela

Area
  - Total: 172.43 km^{2} (66.58 sq mi)

Population (2025-01-01)
  - Total: 1,816
  - Density: 10.53/km^{2} (27.28/sq mi)
- Time zone: UTC+1 (CET)
  - Summer (DST): UTC+2 (CEST)

Monfero is a municipality in the comarca of Eume in the province of A Coruña in the autonomous community of Galicia in northwestern Spain. It has a population of 2,178 inhabitants (INE, 2011).

== Main sights ==
- The "Fragas" of the River Eume Natural Park with its typical Atlantic Forest, and unique ecosystem and biodiversity, offers the visitor one of the most beautiful Galician landscapes. (Declared Natural park in 1997).
- Monfero is home to a historical castle and to the St. Mary of Monfero's Monastery, together with other ruins of the Middle Ages.

== Industry ==
Monfero's economy is based almost exclusively on farming, agriculture and timber production, though services also do exist.

== See also ==
List of municipalities in A Coruña
