= Andrade =

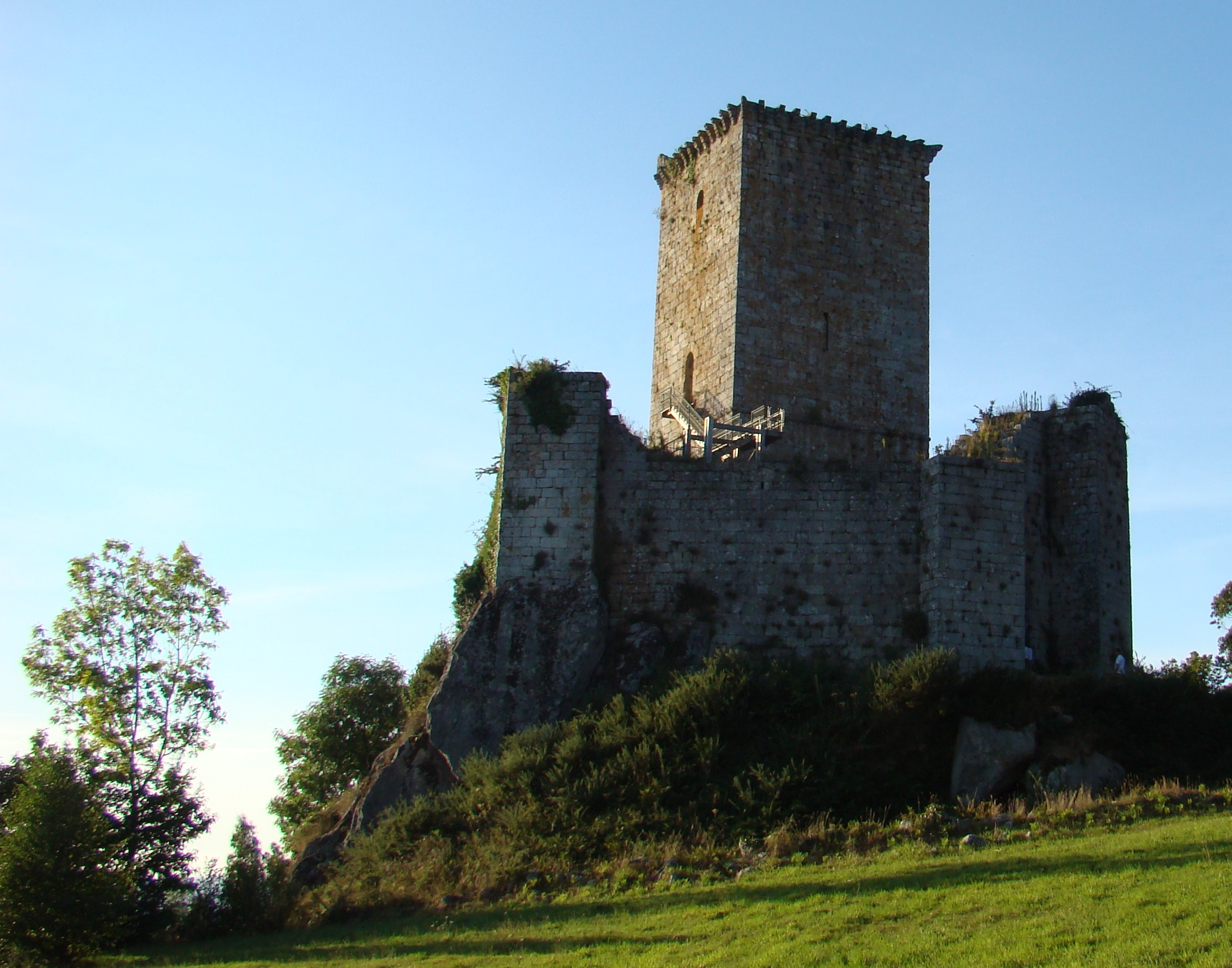
Castle of Andrade, Galicia

Andrade (/ɐ̃ˈdɾa.d͡ʒi/ (Brazil), [ɐ̃ˈdɾa.ðɨ] (Portugal), or [ãn̪ˈd̪ɾa.ð̞e] (Spanish)) is a surname of Galician origin, which emerged in the 12th century as the family name of the knights and lords of the small parish of San Martiño de Andrade (St. Martin of Andrade), in the municipality of Pontedeume. The first mention of this small territory is to be found in the documentation of the monastery of San Xoán de Caaveiro (18 km away), and belong chronologically to the 9th century. It was part of the region of Pruzos, which was created as an administrative and ecclesiastical territory of Kingdom of Galicia in the sixth century by King Teodomiro (reigned 559–570) through a document written in Latin called Parrochiale suevum, Parochiale suevorum or Theodomiri Divisio. From the 12th century Pruzos, and therefore Andrade, were integrated into the county of Trastámara that belonged to the lineage Traba, the most powerful Galician family. By this same time the family group: Fortúnez, begins to unite their names Andrade as surname, since in this parish their family home was located. The knights of Andrade were faithful vassals of their lords the Counts of Trastámara throughout the middle centuries of the Middle Ages.

There is a notable Jewish branch which originated in Portugal in the 17th century as da Costa d'Andrade, and soon moved into England. The surname Andrade is found predominantly in Portugal and Spain, and in countries of Latin America, Italy, Equatorial Guinea and East Timor, Philippines, and Goa and Karnataka in India. There is an important concentration of Andrade families residing in the United States, specifically, California, Massachusetts, Hawaii and Rhode Island.

== The aristocratic family of Andrade ==
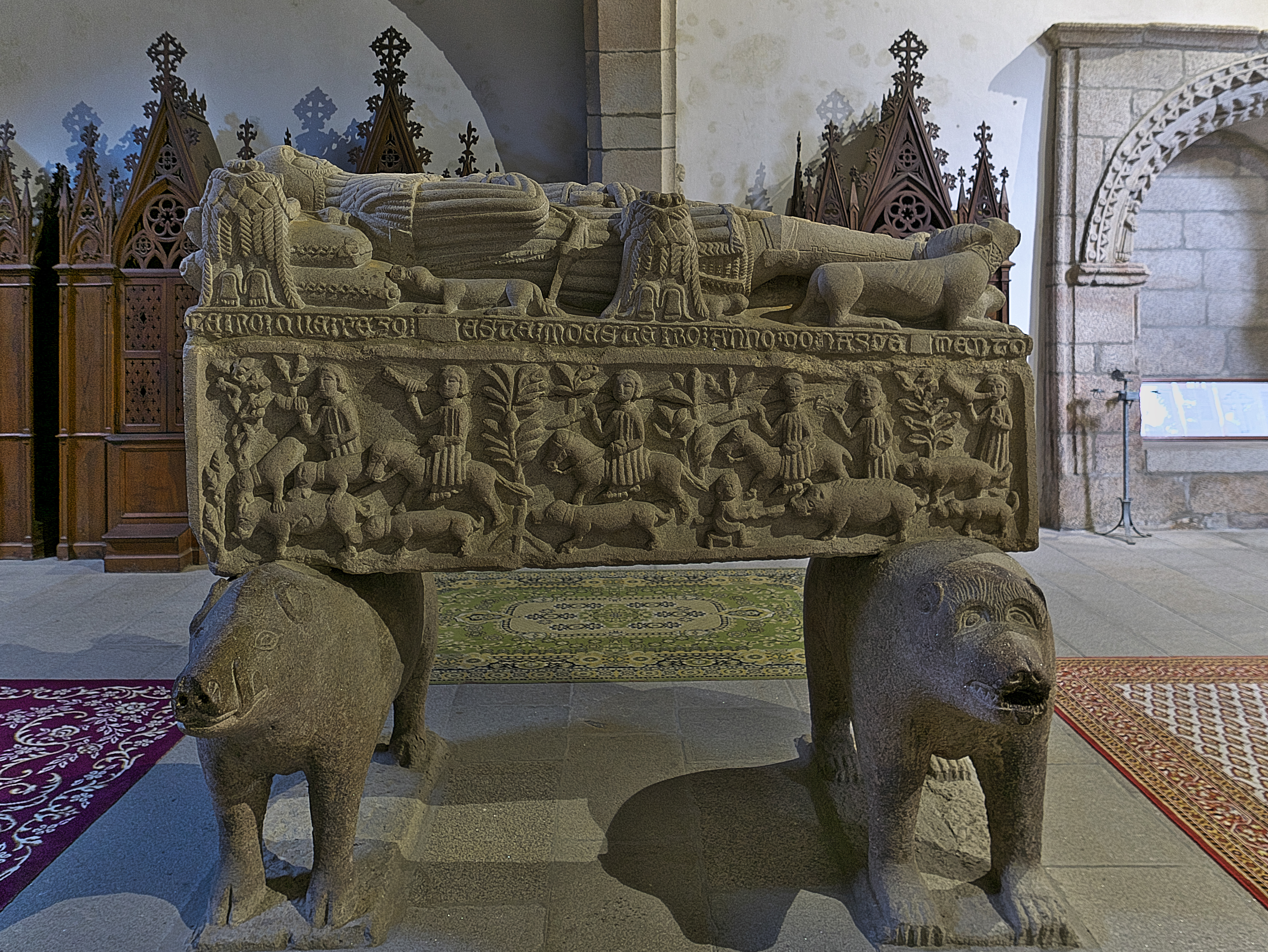
Tomb of the knight Fernan Perez d'Andrade (d. 1387 CE), Betanzos, Galicia. Note the family coat of arms.

Andrade became a powerful family in north-western Iberian Peninsula during the late Middle Ages and the early Renaissance, during which time they held the titles of Counts of Andrade and Vilalba, amongst others, together with numerous castles, palaces, manor houses and extensive lands. The city of Ferrol and the borough of Pontedeume in particular have always been regarded as the areas with the closest attachment to the Andrades, to the point, that Pontedeume has always been, and still is, known as The Borough of Andrade.

The two Galician regions of Ferrolterra and Terra Chá (i.e. the Province of Mondoñedo which disappeared as a province in the 1833 territorial division of Spain though still exists as the Roman Catholic district of the Diocese of Mondoñedo-Ferrol) are known to have been part of the domains of Fernán Pérez de Andrade in the 14th century. Fernán Pérez de Andrade was made Count of Andrade and Pontedeume, and Lord of Ferrol, Serantes and Vilar. Later the family would obtain the title of Counts of Vilalba under the Catholic Monarchs gaining full control over the entire Terra Chá Region in today's Lugo Province. Most of the Galician properties, palaces and castles of the Andrade family these days belong to the House of Alba, and the present Count of Andrade is Carlos Fitz-James Stuart, 19th Duke of Alba.

In the 12th century, Pedro Fortúnez, son of Fortunio Bermúdez de Andrade, founded the branch that at the end of the 13th century would adopt like name of lineage: Freire. By this same time, concretely in the year 1320 the last knights of Andrade are executed by order of the Archbishop of Santiago de Compostela: Berenguel de Landoira (1317–1330). This moment marked the initial starting point that placed his relatives Freire as the main lineage of the northern area of the current Galician province of A Coruña. From this same branch of the primitive Andrade, the knight Fernán Pérez de Andrade called: "The Good" (died 1397) will emerge as a direct descendant, who was undoubtedly the true founder of the so-called House de Andrade. Pontedeume, Ferrol and Vilalba were given in the 14th century to Fernán Pérez by the king Henry II of Castile due to his services against his brother the King Pedro of Castile.

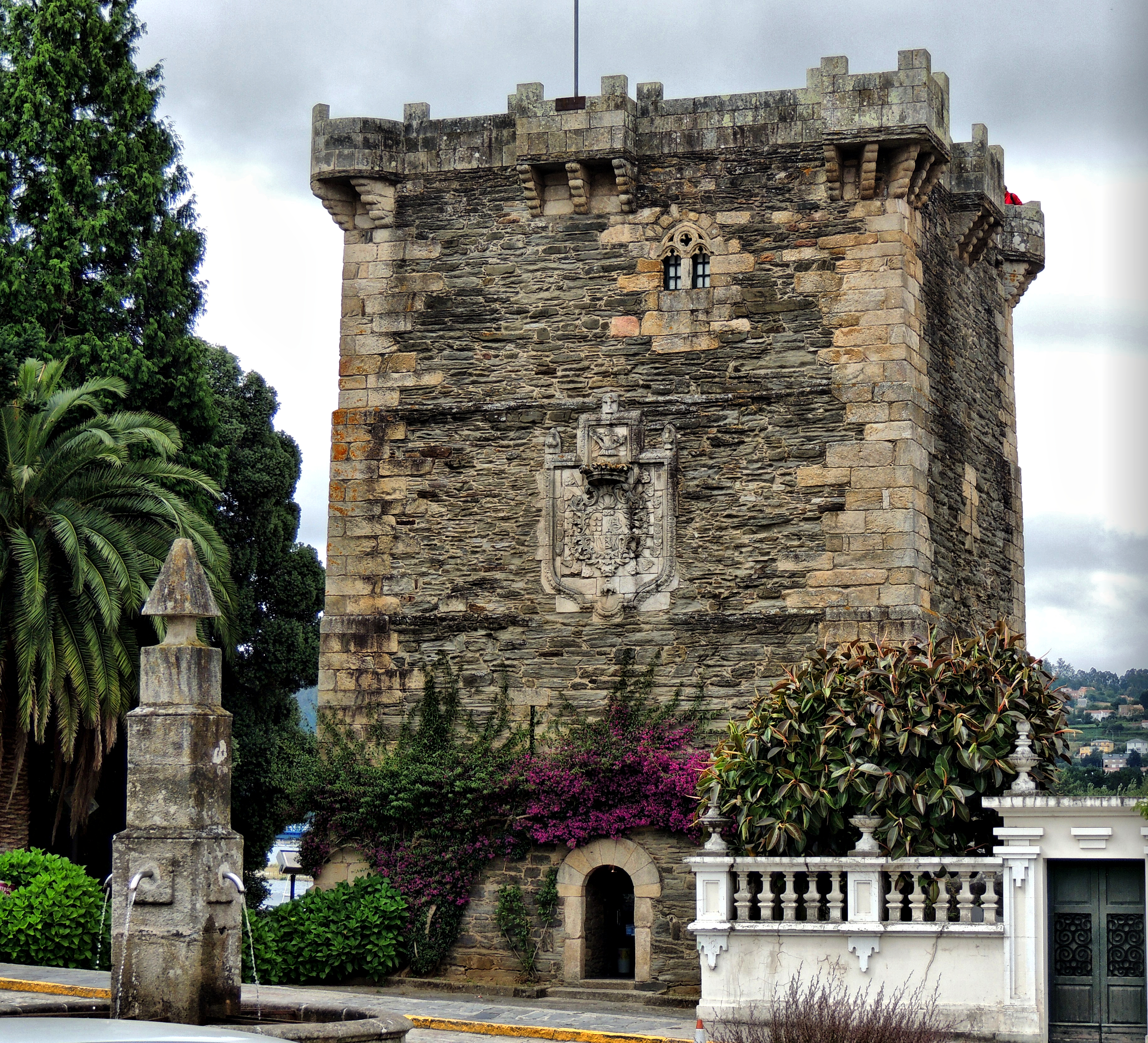
Tower of the ancient pazo (manor) of the Andrade, Pontedeume, Galicia

Some of the main branches that emerged directly from this lineage were:

- The branch of the descendants of Nuño Freire de Andrade, brother of Fernán Pérez de Andrade, who left Galicia to settle definitively in the kingdom of Portugal. From this character, all the families that today use the surname Andrade descend from their illegitimate children.
- The branch emerged in the thirteenth century from Sancha Oanes, daughter of Juan Freire, which would use as the name of the lineage "Díaz de Andrade", or "Díaz de Santamarta" that would occupy the lands around the town of Santa Marta de Ortigueira in the north of Galicia.
- The descendants of Pedro Fernández de Andrade, son of another Fernán Pérez de Andrade, owner of the house of Andrade in the fifteenth century. This branch was established in the city of Betanzos and reached the nobility titles of Counts of Maceda in the year 1654, and Taboada.

In the sixteenth century Teresa de Andrade, daughter of Fernando de Andrade and Mariñas, first Count of Andrade, married Fernando Ruiz de Castro and Portugal, fourth Count of Lemos and main noble of the kingdom of Galicia. At this moment the House of Andrade is definitely integrated into the House of Castro, and both in the House of Alba from different marriage links.

Coat of arms as borne by the Duchess of Franco

=== The Portuguese branch ===
Coat of arms of the Spanish Andrade family

This family soon spread to Portugal. This happened several times and with several different branches of the Andrade. The most important branch to go to Portugal was that of the 14th century Freire de Andrade in the person of Nuno Freire de Andrade (son of Ruy Freire de Andrade, and brother of the founder of the House: Fernán Pérez de Andrade), later 6th Grand-Master of the Order of Christ. From this branch of the Freire de Andrade came João Fernandes de Andrade who, having served the Portuguese Kings Afonso V and John II in the conquest of the Moroccan strongholds of Tangier and Asilah, was granted a new coat of arms and possessions in the Portuguese Island of Madeira, namely in Arco da Calheta (Bow of the Calheta). João Fernandes de Andrade, known also as João Fernandes de Andrade do Arco, married Beatriz de Abreu and had prolific issue, descendants of whom were present in the colonization of Brazil. Jacob Velosinho de Andrade translated Saul Morteira's "Torat Mosheh" into Portuguese under the title "Epitome de la Verdad de la Ley de Moyses."

== People with the surname ==
=== Footballers ===
- Adolfo Andrade (1950–2025), Colombian footballer
- Andrés Andrade (footballer, born 1989), Colombian footballer
- Andrés Andrade (footballer, born 1998), Panamanian footballer
- David Andrade (footballer), Mexican footballer
- Diogo Andrade (born 1985), Portuguese former footballer
- João Henrique de Andrade Amaral (born 1981), Brazilian footballer
- Jorge Andrade (born 1978), Portuguese footballer
- Jorge Luís Andrade da Silva (born 1957), Brazilian footballer
- José Leandro Andrade (1901–1957), Uruguayan footballer
- Lady Andrade (born 1992), Colombian footballer
- Maxwell Cabelino Andrade (born 1981), Brazilian footballer
- Moisés Matias de Andrade (born 1948), Brazilian manager and former footballer
- Richarlison de Andrade, known as simply Richarlison (born 1997), Brazilian footballer

=== Other people ===
- Wyatt Andrade, American Race Car driver
- Agustina Andrade, Argentine poet
- Alberto Andrade, Peruvian politician
- Alex Andrade, American politician
- Aloysio de Andrade Faria, Brazilian businessman
- Amalia Andrade Arango, Colombian writer
- Andrés Andrade (tennis), Ecuadorian tennis player
- António de Andrade, Portuguese priest, the first European to explore Tibet
- Athene Andrade, English artist
- Billy Andrade, American golfer
- Carlos Drummond de Andrade, Brazilian poet
- Daniela Andrade, Honduran-Canadian singer and songwriter
- David Andrade (anarchist), Australian anarchist
- Demetrius Andrade, American boxer
- Dino Andrade, American voice actor
- Edward Andrade, English physicist
- Fabrício Andrade, Brazilian mixed martial artist
- Fernão Pires de Andrade, Portuguese merchant
- Francisco Andrade Marín, former President of Ecuador
- Glauber de Andrade Rocha, Brazilian filmmaker.
- Gomes Freire de Andrade, Portuguese army officer
- Hernán Andrade, Mexican racewalker
- Hope Andrade, American politician
- Ignacio Andrade Troconis, former President of Venezuela
- Jaime Andrade Jr., Illinois politician
- Jeferson Andrade (born 1980), Brazilian politician
- Jéssica Andrade, Brazilian mixed martial artist
- Joaquim Pedro de Andrade, Brazilian filmmaker
- José Bonifácio de Andrade e Silva, Brazilian statesman
- José María Reina Andrade, former President of Guatemala
- Leny Andrade, Brazilian singer
- Levine Andrade, Indian-born British musician (violin & viola), and conductor
- Librado Andrade, Mexican boxer
- Manuel Alfonso Andrade Oropeza (born 1989), Mexican professional wrestler known as Andrade
- Manuel de Jesús Andrade Suárez, Colombian writer, journalist and politician
- Marcelo Costa de Andrade, Brazilian serial killer, rapist, and necrophile
- Mário de Andrade, Brazilian poet
- Mário Pinto de Andrade, Angolan politician and writer
- Mariza de Andrade, Brazilian-American statistician
- Marta Andrade, Spanish figure skater
- Mayra Andrade, Cape Verdean singer
- Michelle Andrade, Ukrainian singer and television presenter
- Olegario Víctor Andrade, Argentine journalist, poet and politician
- Oswald de Andrade, Brazilian poet
- Rebeca Andrade, Brazilian artistic gymnast
- Serenella Andrade, Portuguese journalist and television presenter
- Susana Andrade (born 1963), Uruguayan procurator, journalist, columnist, and politician
- Tchinda Andrade (1979–2024), Cape Verdean LGBT activist and event manager

== See also ==
- Iberian naming customs
