= Devoto =

Devoto can refer to:

== Places ==
- Devoto Palace, a former mansion in Buenos Aires
- Villa Devoto, a district in Buenos Aires, Argentina

== People ==
- Antonio Devoto, the historic landlord of Villa Devoto
- Howard Devoto, British musician, member of the Buzzcocks and the ShelleyDevoto collaboration with Pete Shelley
- Giacomo Devoto, Italian linguist
- Ollie Devoto, English rugby union player

When capitalized as DeVoto, it can refer to:

- Avis DeVoto, American culinary editor, book reviewer, and cook
- Bernard DeVoto, American historian and author
- Mark DeVoto, American professor emeritus of music at Tufts University
