= Villa Devoto =

Coordinates: 34°36′S 58°31′W

- Neighbourhood of Buenos Aires
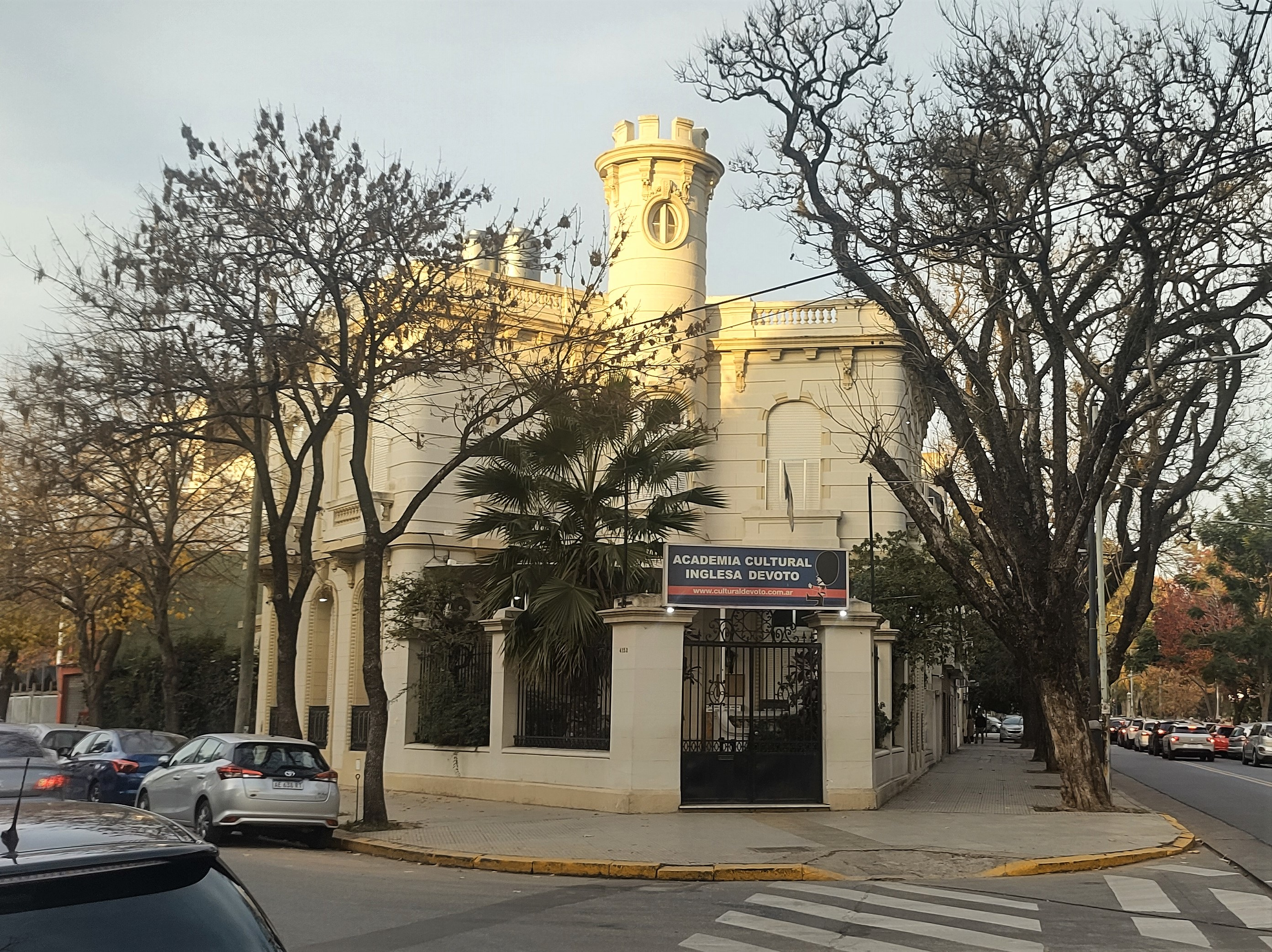
- Building on Habana street

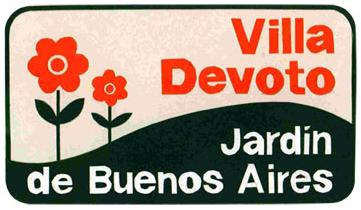
- Nickname: Garden of Buenos Aires
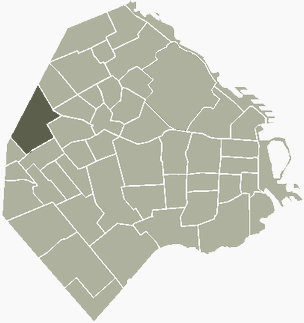
- Location of Villa Devoto within Buenos Aires
- Country: Argentina
- Autonomous City: Buenos Aires
- Comuna: C11
- Established: 1889; 137 years ago

Area
  - Total: 6.6 km^{2} (2.5 sq mi)

Population
  - Total: 71,013
  - Density: 11,000/km^{2} (28,000/sq mi)
- Time zone: UTC-3 (ART)

Villa Devoto is a neighborhood or district located in the northwestern area of the city of Buenos Aires, Argentina. Its administrative limits are defined by Lope de Vega, General Paz, San Martín, and Francisco Beiró Avenues; and Joaquín V. González, Baigorria, and Campana streets.

Villa Devoto, a primarily middle class to upscale neighborhood, is characterized by quiet tree-lined streets and is often considered as The Garden of Buenos Aires. A lower-density, wealthy residential subsection known as Devoto R is located around Arenales Square, in the ward's north-central section.

Villa Devoto is served by the FC Urquiza and FC San Martín commuter railway lines.

== History ==
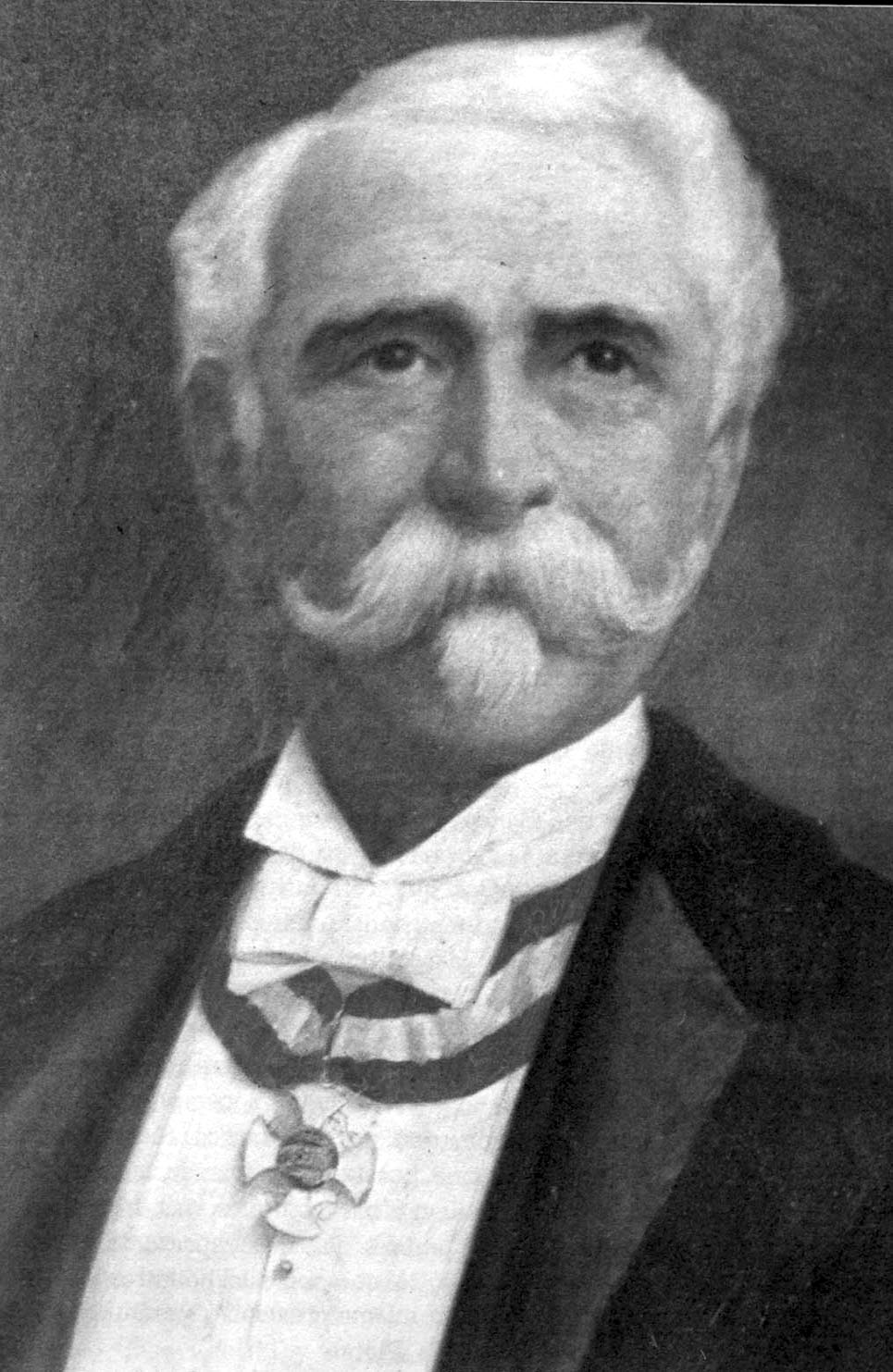
The neighborhood was named after Antonio Devoto (pictured)

Towards the end of 1615, the then governor of the Governorate of the Río de la Plata, Hernando Arias de Saavedra, granted several hundred hectares to Cristóbal de Luque y Cobos in what is now the center of Devoto.

Around 1700, a group of Jesuits established themselves to the east of the neighbourhood, at the corner of Helguera and Navarro streets. In 1767 those residents were expelled from the lands and their building was abandoned. It was still standing in the mid-19th century.

In 1734, the lands which are today's Devoto became the property of José Blas de Gainza, and the area was therefore known as Villa Gainza y Lynch. His heirs owned them until 1852, when they sold them to Santiago Altube, a Basque farmer who had immigrated to Argentina with his family in 1846 fleeing the First Carlist War. The Altube family founded a farming and livestock operation in 1856 in what is now the center of the neighbourhood, and their heirs resided there until 1882. They also operated a dairy farm in the area called Lechuza ("Barn Owl").

From February 25, 1864, the lands were incorporated into the then new neighbouring district of General San Martín Partido (northern Greater Buenos Aires). Its first mayor was Félix Ballester. The area which formed today's Devoto was an exurb at the time. Its administrative status as part of Buenos Aires Province continued until 1888, when the area was incorporated into Buenos Aires City following the Federalization of Buenos Aires City (1880). A rail link was built by the Buenos Aires and Pacific Railway, which inaugurated Devoto Station in 1888.

The district was finally named after Count Antonio Devoto, who became the landowner of most of the present-day district in 1904. The Count Devoto was a member of the elite of Buenos Aires. King Victor Emmanuel III of Italy granted Devoto the title of count in 1916 in gratitude for his assistance to the Kingdom of Italy during World War I; Devoto died a few months later.

Devoto owned one of the largest mansions of Buenos Aires, known as Devoto Palace. The mansion was built by Italian architect Juan Antonio Buschiazzo, its 10,000 m² (107,000 ft²) decorated in bronze, silver and gold with ironwork forged in Italy, as well as Florentine mosaics. Prince Umberto di Savoia stayed there during a state visit in 1924. Devoto died before Buschiazzo's work was complete, and the mansion was demolished around 1940. He did not leave any descendants, and his remains lie at the Basílica of San Antonio de Padua in Villa Devoto.

The Metropolitan Seminary of Buenos Aires, alma mater to many of Argentina's bishops and archbishops, was established in Villa Devoto in 1899; among its alumni was the future Pope Francis. The Devoto Penitentiary, the city's sole remaining jail, was established in 1927. The ward became a bedroom community in later decades, as well as home to a sizable English Argentine and American expatriate community; a Garden Club was established by the English-speaking community in 1978.

== Sports ==
Villa Devoto is home to two football clubs:

- Kimberley, formerly affiliated to dissident Federación Argentina de Football (then merged with official AFA), having played in the top division, Primera División, during the 1910s. In 2006 Kimberley rejoined AFA to compete in the futsal tournaments organised by the Association.
- General Lamadrid, established in 1950 and currently playing in Primera C Metropolitana.

== Landmarks ==
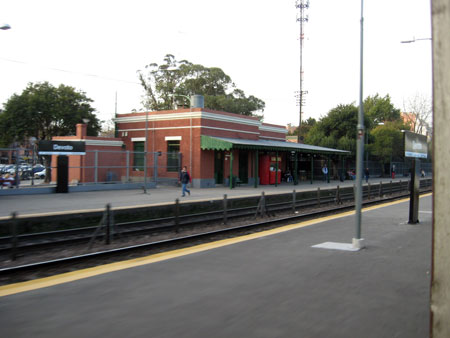
San Martín line - Devoto Station

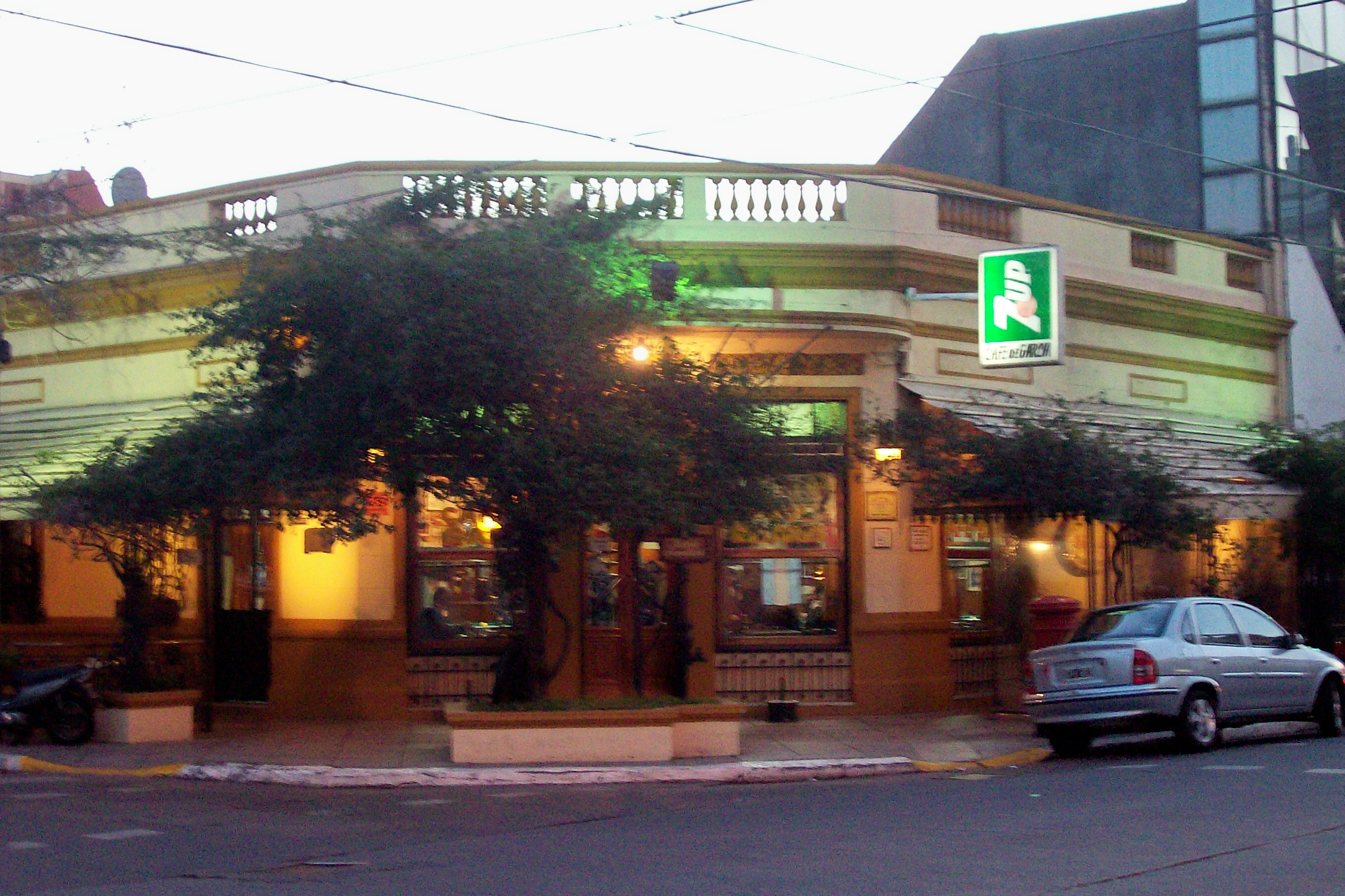
Café de García, a neighborhood landmark since 1927

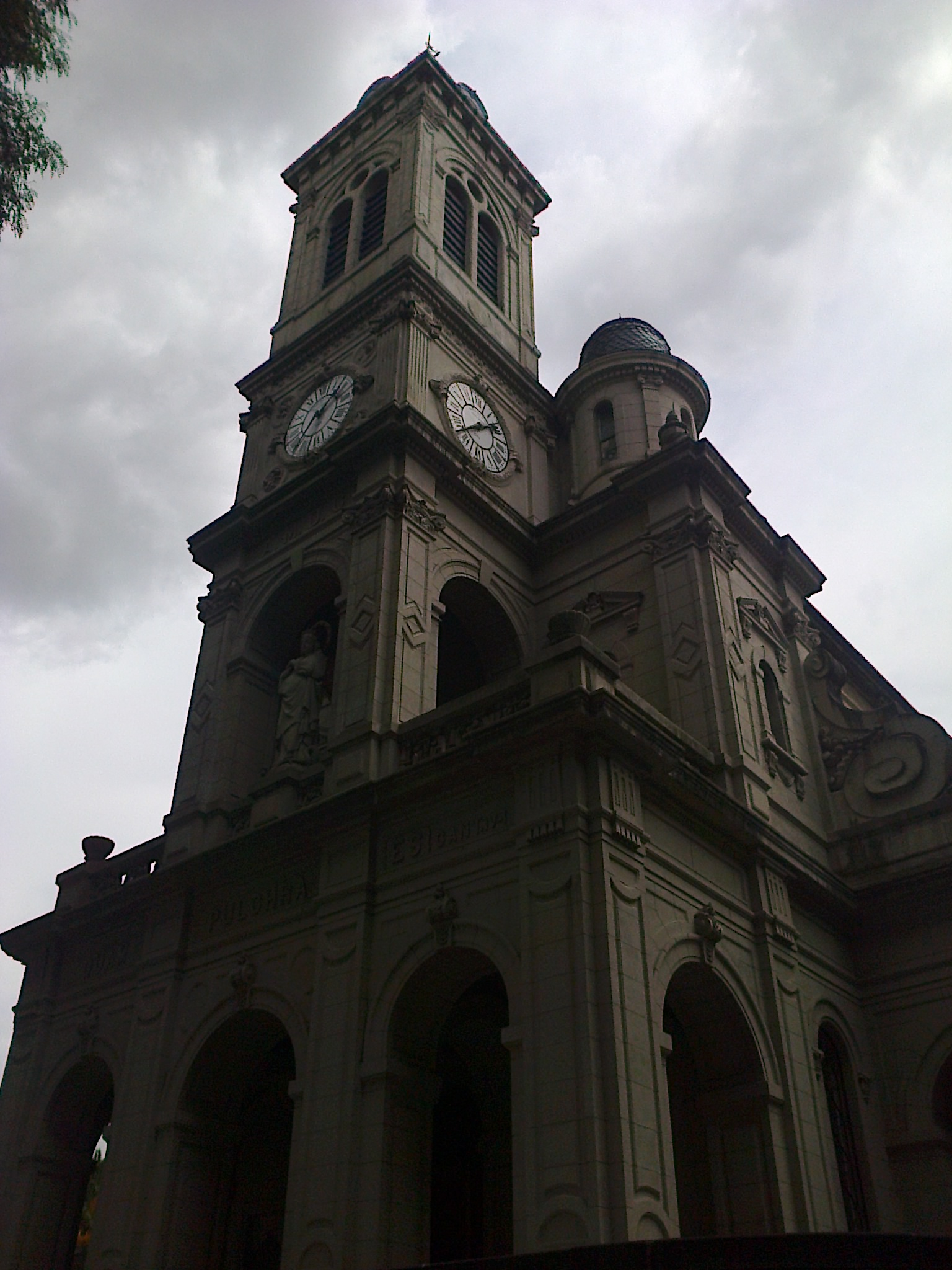
Church of the Immaculate Conception

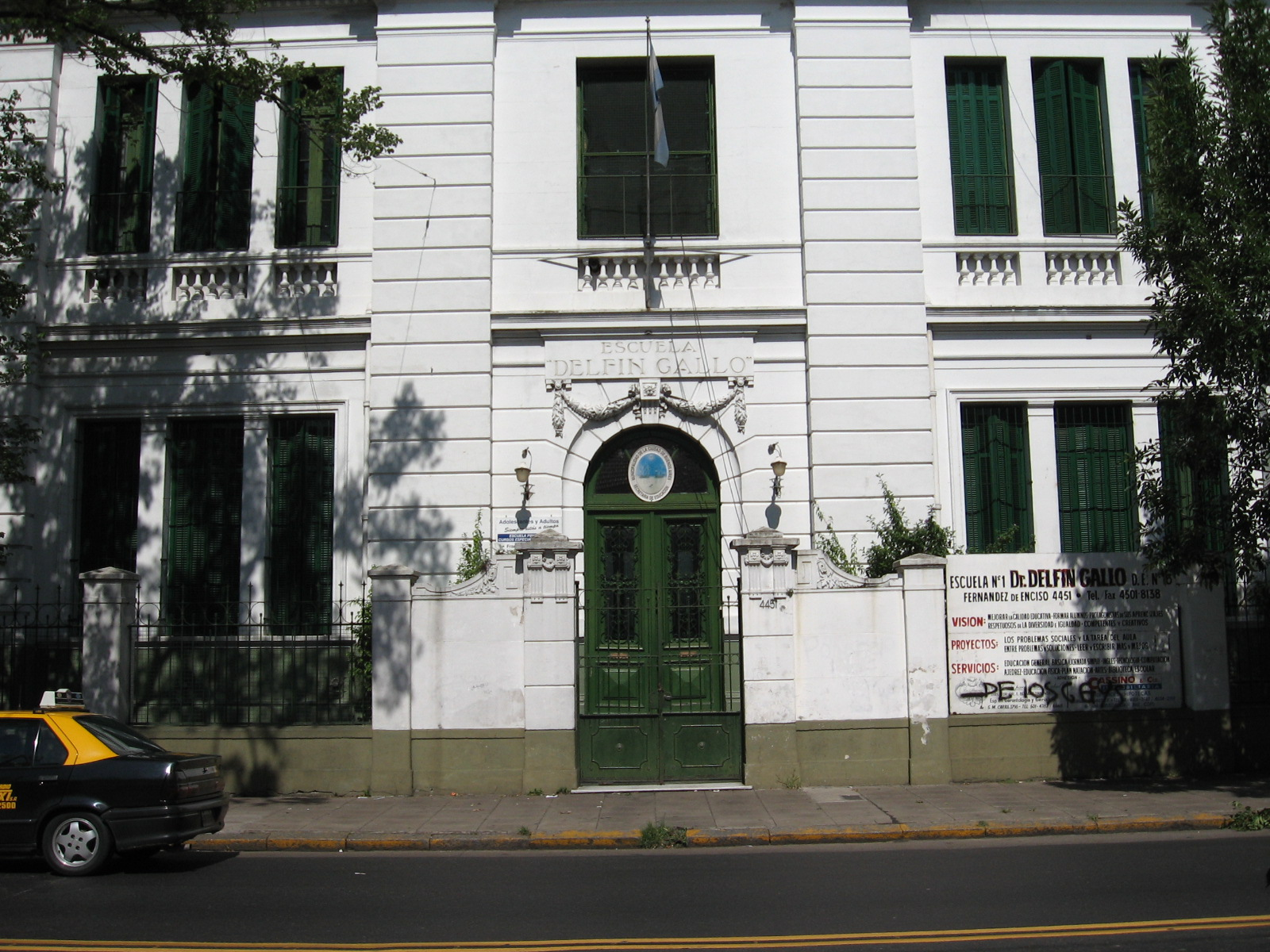
Delfín Gallo School

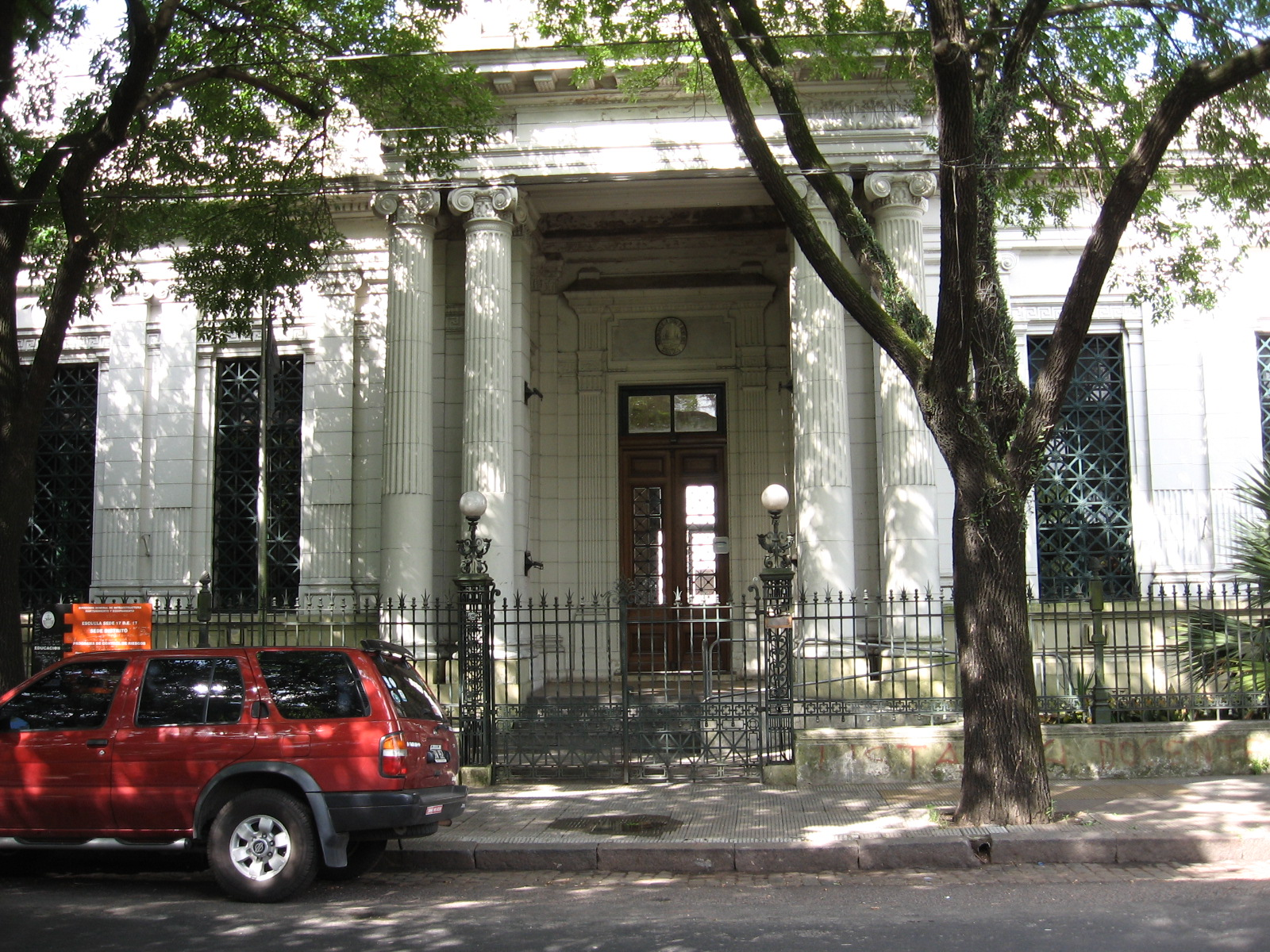
Devoto Public Library

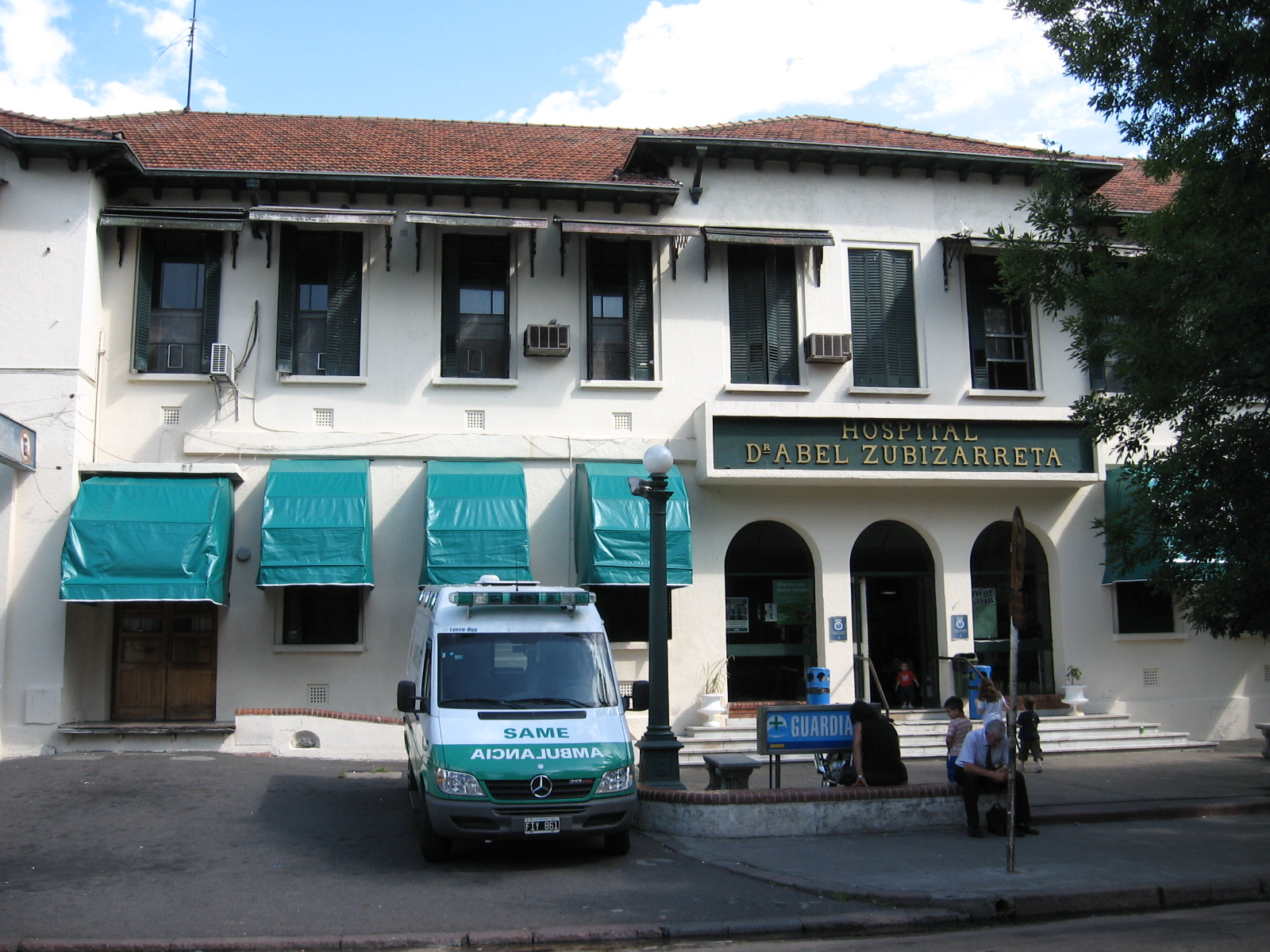
Zubizarreta Hospital

== Personalities ==
- Jorge Bergoglio, the 266th Pope of the Catholic Church as Pope Francis, studied in 1958 at the Metropolitan Seminary of Villa Devoto.

The following have all been residents of Villa Devoto:

- Olegario Víctor Andrade, poet
- Diego Maradona, footballer
- Mario Pergolini, TV producer
- Gabriela Sabatini, tennis player
- Leopoldo Galtieri, general, military dictator and de facto president of Argentina
- Javier Milei, president of Argentina

== See also ==
- Antonio Devoto
- Devoto Palace
