= Ramón Lista =

Argentinian soldier, explorer and participant in the Selkʼnam genocide

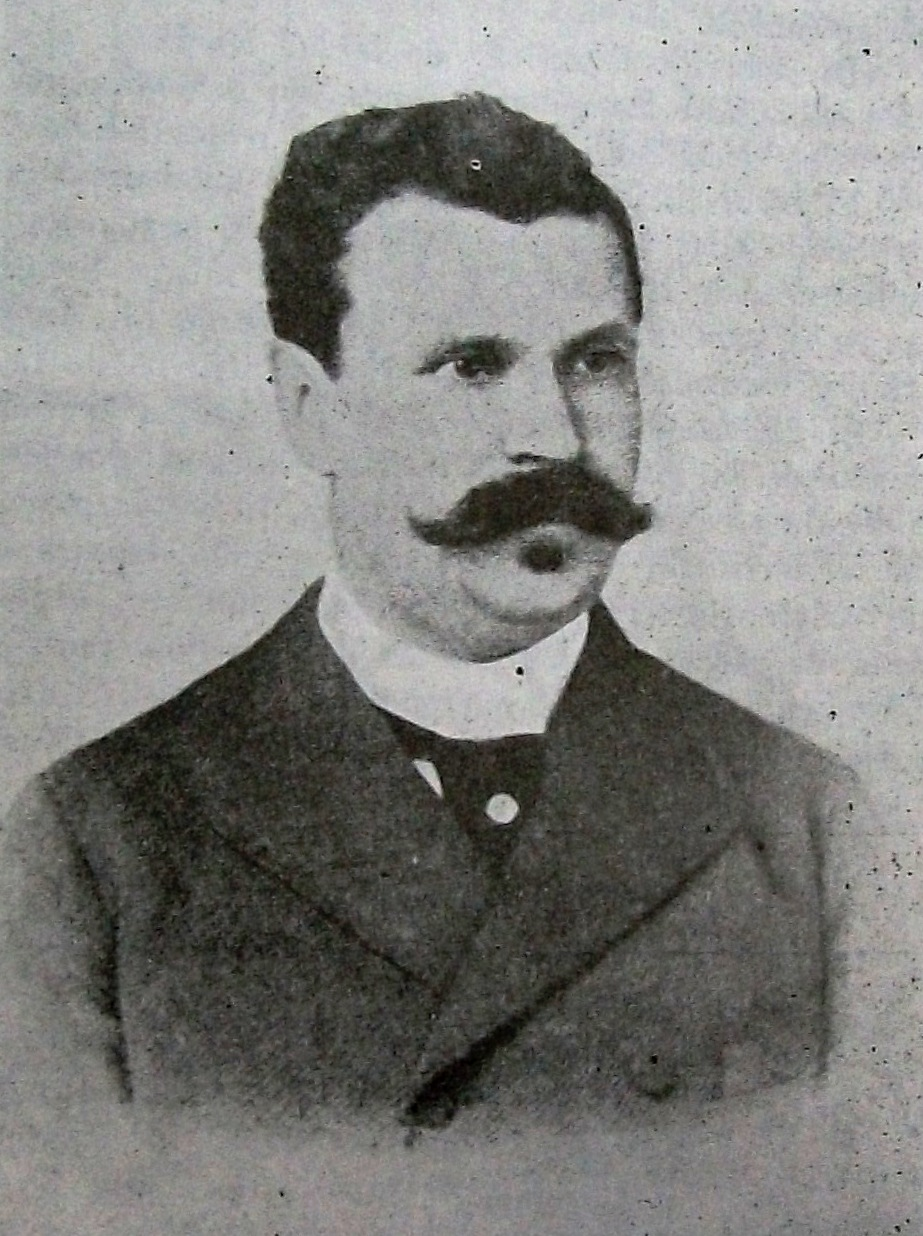
- Ramón Lista
- Born: 13 September 1856; Buenos Aires, Argentina
- Died: 23 November 1897 (aged 41); Orán, Salta, Argentina
- Cause of death: Murder
- Occupation(s): Soldier, explorer
- Known for: Selkʼnam Genocide

Ramón Lista (13 September 1856 – 23 November 1897) was an Argentinian soldier and explorer. He was the second governor of the Territorio Nacional de Santa Cruz, precursor of Santa Cruz Province, Argentina. He played a key role in the Selkʼnam genocide in Tierra del Fuego. Later he identified with the indigenous people of Patagonia, and went to live with them until he was recalled to Buenos Aires. Lista wrote a number of books on the people and places he had found.

== Early years ==
Ramón Lista was born on 13 September 1856 in Buenos Aires. His grandfather, also called Ramón Lista, was a Colonel of Infantry. Ramón Lista studied at the Colegio Nacional in Buenos Aires. When only 15 years old he taught history and geography at the Colegio del Salvador. He traveled in France and Germany in 1875–77. He was interested in natural sciences, met the main scientific figures and was taught by the great scientist Hermann Burmeister (1807–92). On his return from Europe at the age of 21 he was appointed a civilian explorer for the navy, with the rank of "superior officer".

== Explorer ==
=== Patagonia 1877–84 ===
The Scientific Society sponsored an expedition to Patagonia to explore the region between Punta Arenas and Santa Cruz. In March 1878 Lista landed at Punta Arenas in the Strait of Magellan, where he made a careful examination of the mines. In mid-August (Note: In the southern hemisphere, mid-August is late winter.) he set off for the north, passed the Santa Cruz valley and explored the Chico River, the main object of the expedition. He traveled up the river to the foot of the Cordillera of the Andes, and claimed the land for Argentina. Returning east, on 6 November 1878 he met an encampment of friendly Tehuelche people in the Shehueu valley. He found that they were tall, as had been reported earlier, indolent and addicted to gambling, but kind and hospitable. They lived by hunting. Lista made a collection of words in their language. Lista became a friend of Papón, a Tehuelche leader, and the friendship survived until Lista's death in 1897. At one time they traveled to Buenos Aires together, where the only thing in which Papón showed interest were two elephants in the zoo. Lista took this apparent lack of curiosity in modern things as evidence of the inability of the "savage Tehuelche" to change.

In 1879 Lista married Agustina Pastora Andrade (1858–91), a poet and the daughter of his friend the famous writer and poet Olegario Víctor Andrade (1839–1882). That year he surveyed the coast between Carmen de Patagones and San Antonio. A few years later he explored the area of Patagonia from Valcheta to Choele Choel and the Deseado River. In 1884 he made a 3,500 kilometres (2,200 mi) voyage on horseback that discovered the main rivers that flowed into the Atlantic Ocean.

=== Tierra del Fuego 1886–87 ===
Lista was the first native-born Argentinian to explore the island of Tierra del Fuego. In a report to President Miguel Juárez Celman in 1886 Lista expressed his disgust that the Selkʼnam people (Ona) of Tierra del Fuego would not let him take "anthropometric measures" of their heads. In 1887 he explored the east coast of the island from Cape San Sebastián to Bahía Thetis accompanied by a chaplain and 25 soldiers. In the preface to his book Viaje al país de los Onas Lista takes responsibility for an encounter in which 26 Indians armed with bows and arrows were shot dead. Some of the survivors were taken prisoner, and he sent some of the women to Río Gallegos, Santa Cruz. He said of the island, "It is inhabited by cannibal tribes that are ethnographically placed as the lowest of human beings."

=== Santa Cruz 1887–92 ===
Lista succeeded Carlos María Moyano as governor of Santa Cruz from 1887 to 1892. In 1890 he navigated up the Santa Cruz River in a steam boat to Argentino Lake. At this time Ramón Lista's wife and two young daughters lived at his home in Temperley, Buenos Aires while Lista alternated between his governor's house in Río Gallegos and his Tehuelche common-law wife Koila in an encampment at Paso del Roble, forty leagues away. Koila bore him a daughter, Ramona Cecilia Lista. In 1890 his legal wife, Agustina Pastora Andrade, learned of her husband's parallel family in Patagonia. Heartbroken, she locked herself in the house for months on end, before leaving her two daughters in the care of her mother and committing suicide with a revolver on 10 February 1891.

By late 1891 Ramón Lista had identified himself with the Tehuelche, and was staying on the Tehuelche side of the border. News of what was happening reached Buenos Aires and caused a minor scandal. President Carlos Pellegrini arranged for Juan Víctor Paris, an old friend of Lista from his 1887 expedition in Patagonia, to find Lista, who returned to the capital by steamer from Punta Arenas and resigned his post. It was all handled very discreetly. Lista was replaced as governor by Edelmiro Mayer.

=== Later years 1892–97 ===
After returning to Buenos Aires Lista founded the Argentine Geographical Society, which published a magazine on geography and other sciences. Lista continued exploration of Patagonia to the Strait of Magellan, the Gran Chaco and the mission territories in preparation for them to be incorporated in Argentina. He wrote on archaeology, anthropology, ethnography, botany and zoology, as well as writing popular accounts of his travels. Lista wrote a book about the Tehuelche, The Tehuelches, a disappearing race, published in 1894. He wrote that they "seemed to be under a divine curse. They are the original owners of the land they inhabit, and now do not have even a plot of ground. They were born free and are now slaves. They die of tuberculosis, and face death as calmly as a Roman gladiator."

Ramón Lista was killed on 23 November 1897 at Miraflores, Orán, Salta in mysterious circumstances, possibly by Toba indigenous people, during an exploration of the Pilcomayo River. His remains were taken back to Buenos Aires for burial in La Recoleta Cemetery in the Andrade family vault.

== Selected works ==
Lista wrote 41 books and papers. They include:

- Ramón Lista (1878). Les cimetières et paraderos minuanes de la province de Entre-Rios. p. 7.
- Ramón Lista (1879). Viaje al país de los Tehuelches: exploraciones en la Patagonia austral por Ramón Lista ... M. Biedma. pp. 82.
- Ramón Lista (1879). La Patagonia austral: complemento del "Viage al país de los Tehuelches". Confluencia. p. 104. ISBN 978-987-9362-04-4.
- Ramón Lista (1880). Mis esploraciones y descubrimientos en la Patagonia 1877-1880. M. Biedma. pp. 213.
- Ramón Lista (1880). Los charruas. M. Biedma. p. 15.
- Ramón Lista (1884). La conquista del Chaco. Soc. Geográfica Argentina. p. 26.
- Ramón Lista (1885). Exploración de la pampa y de la Patagonia. Imp. de La Tribuna Nacional. p. 67.
- Ramón Lista (1887). Viaje al país de los Onas, Tierra del Fuego. A. Nuñez. pp. 145.
- Ramón Lista (1887). Mémoires d'archéologie. Imprimerie de J. Peuser. p. 32.
- Ramón Lista (1891). Viaje a los Andes Australes: diario de la expedición de 1890. Confluencia. p. 123. ISBN 978-987-9362-01-3.
- Ramón Lista (1894). Los indios tehuelches: una raza que desaparece. Patagonia Sur Ediciones. p. 127. ISBN 978-987-22830-0-1.
- Ramón Lista; Republique Argentine Département Général d'Immigration (1895). Le Gouvernement de Santa-Cruz. Bureaux du Département Général d'Immigration. p. 44.
- Ramón Lista (1896). Los Tehuelches de la Patagonia. Pablo E. Coni. p. 11.
- Ramón Lista (1896). La Patagonia andina. p. 27.
- Ramón Lista (1896). Plantas patagonicas. p. 13.
- Ramón Lista. El Territorio de Las Misiones. Kessinger Publishing. p. 120. ISBN 978-1-168-50674-0.
- Ramón Lista; Jorge Carman (1998). Obras: 1887-1897. Editorial Confluencia. ISBN 978-987-96710-0-9.
