= Castle of Andrade =

Medieval fortification in Galicia, Spain

- Castelo dos Andrade
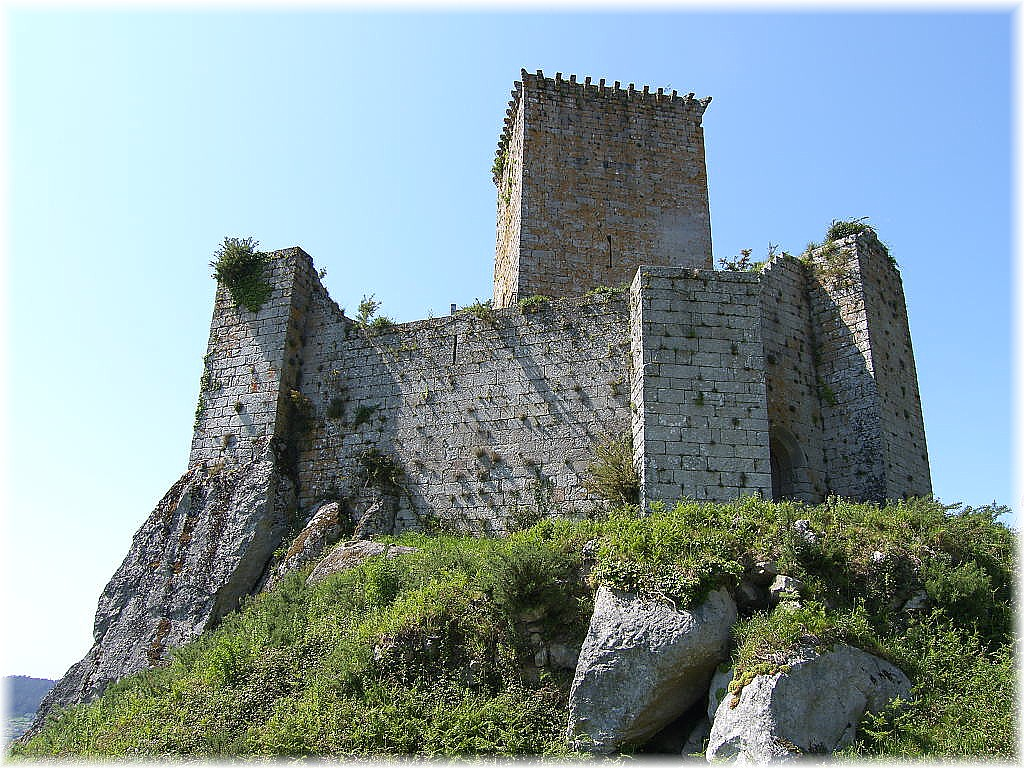
- The Andrade Castle
- Interactive map of the Castle of Andrade area
- Alternative names: Fortaleza da Nogueirosa

General information
- Location: Galicia, Spain
- Coordinates: 43°23′30″N 8°08′08″W
- Inaugurated: 13th century
- Owner: Cayetana Fitz-James Stuart, 18th Duchess of Alba

Height
- Height: 20 m (66 ft)

Castle of Andrade (Galician: Castelo dos Andrade), also known as Castle of Nogueirosa, is a medieval Galician fortification located in the area of Pontedeume, Province of A Coruña (Spain).

== History ==
The construction of the castle began in the 13th century, by order of the lords of Andrade. According to ancient sources, the building had a tunnel that connected the house of the Andrade family with the castle, whose members and relatives were to seek refuge during periods of war. In 1467, the fortress was attacked by Afonso de Lanzós, who was captured and locked in the castle by order of Nuno Freire de Andrade, o Mao.

One of the most famous owners of the castle was Fernán Pérez de Andrade, lord of Pontedeume and Ferrol, to whom Henry II of Castile, granted him all the lands that went from the castle to Cabo Prior (Ferrol). In 1367 Fernán ordered the remodeling of the castle, which was completed by the year 1371.

The castle is located on an isolated crag, and at the time of its construction, was surrounded by a moat, and had a place of arms and drawbridge. The tower is square, and the walls have three widths. The building consists of three floors, with a height of twenty meters, with views to Ares, Betanzos and Ferrol.

== Gallery ==
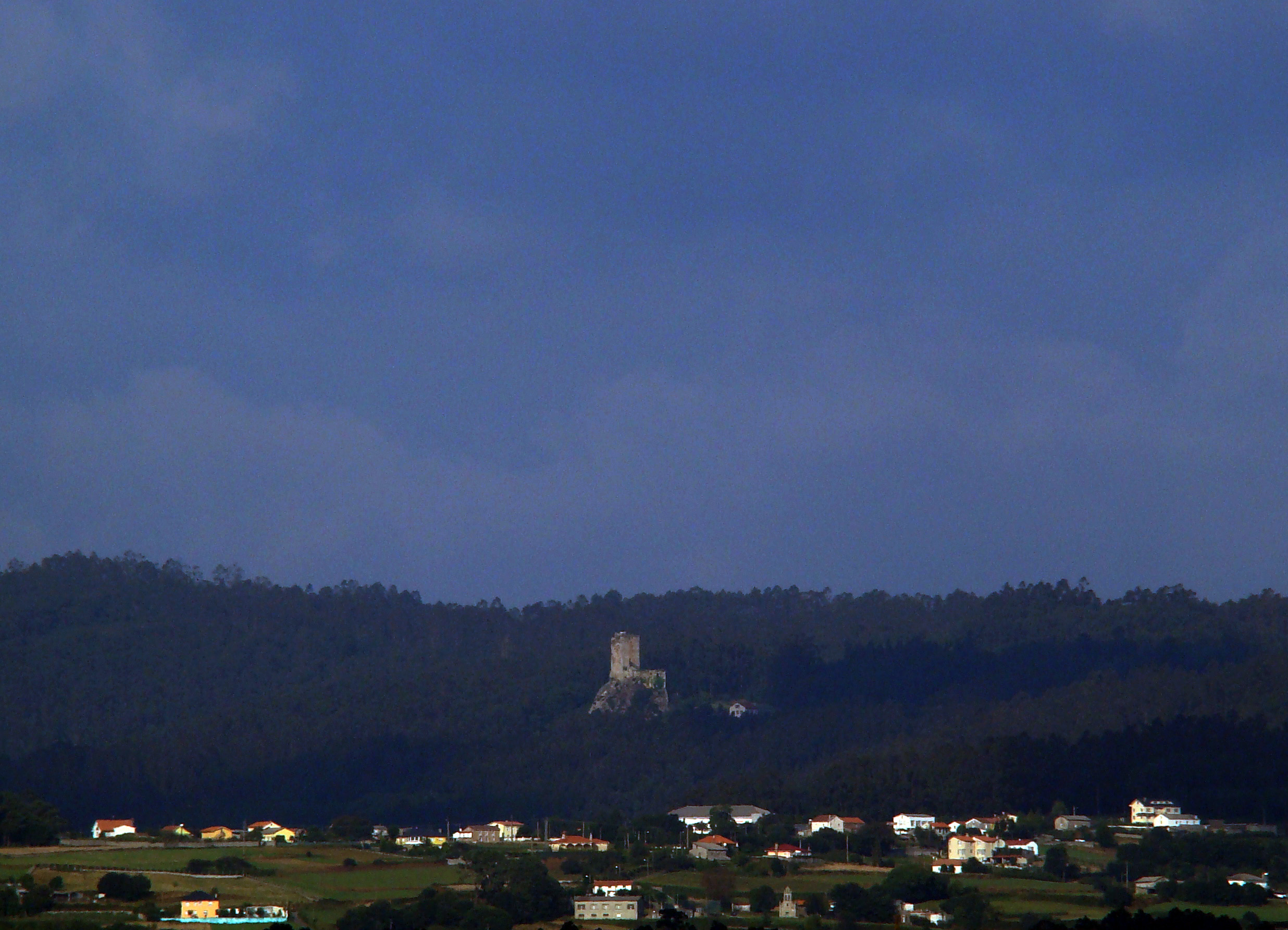
View of Castillo Andrade from Sada

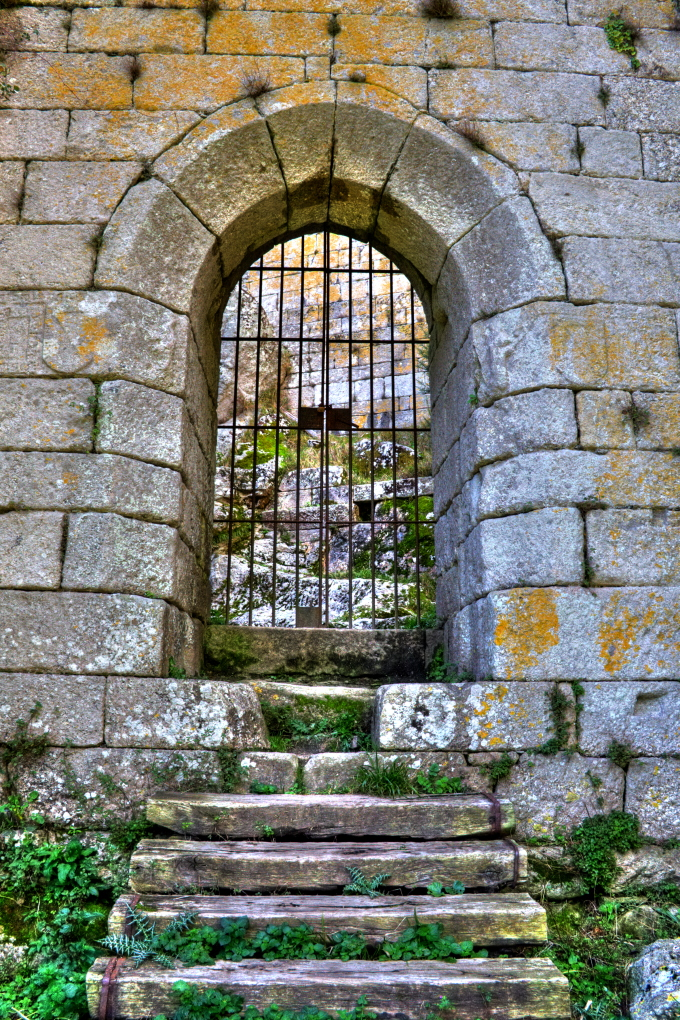
Entrance to the Castle

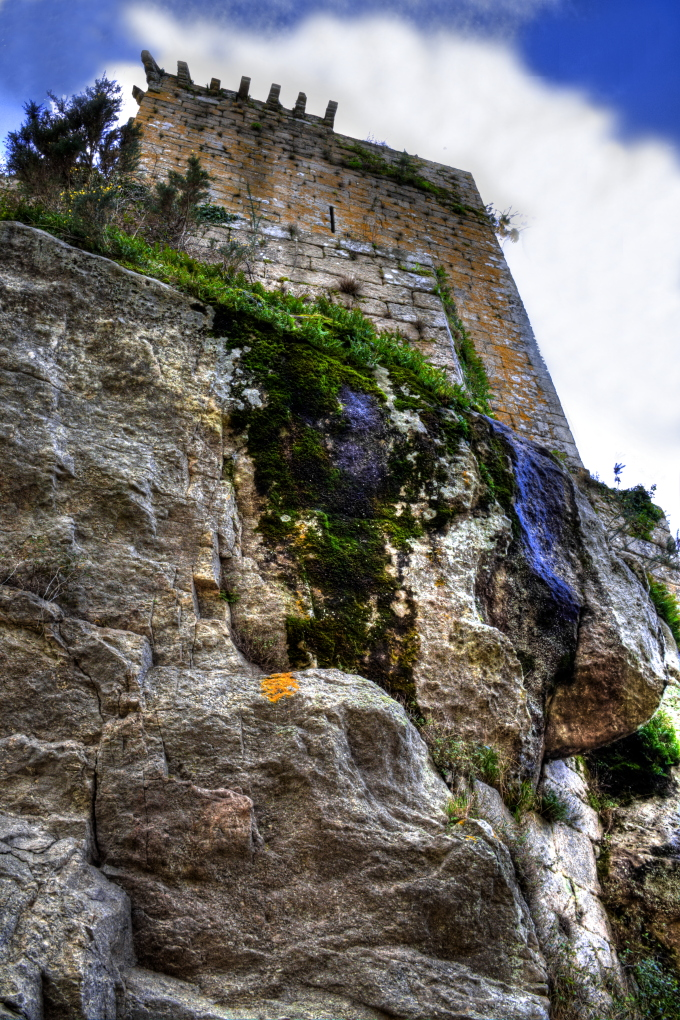
View of Andrade Castle from the rock

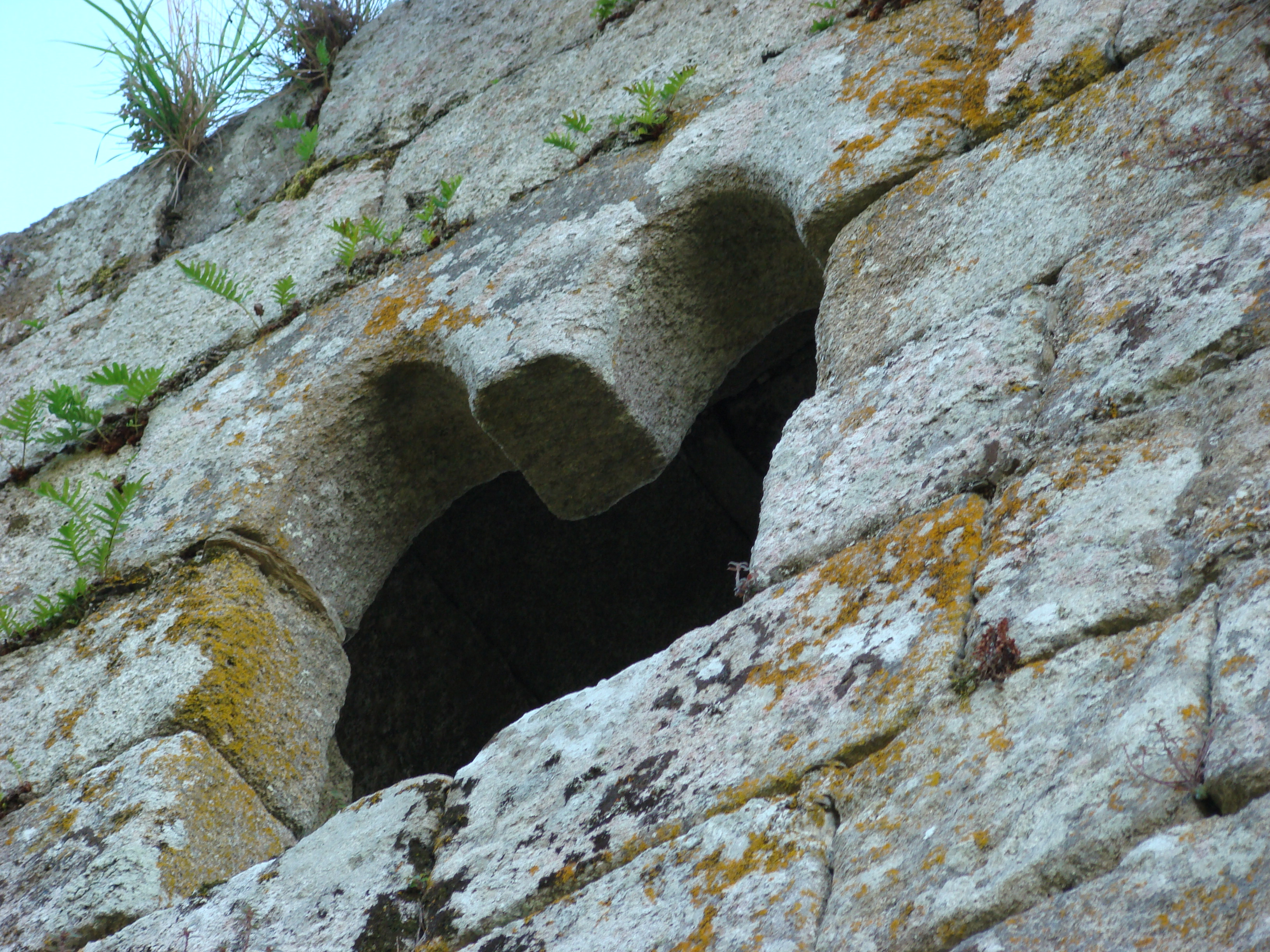
The castle window
