= Inmaculada Concepción Seminary =

Catholic seminary in Buenos Aires, Argentina

Coordinates: 34.59348°S 58.50906°W

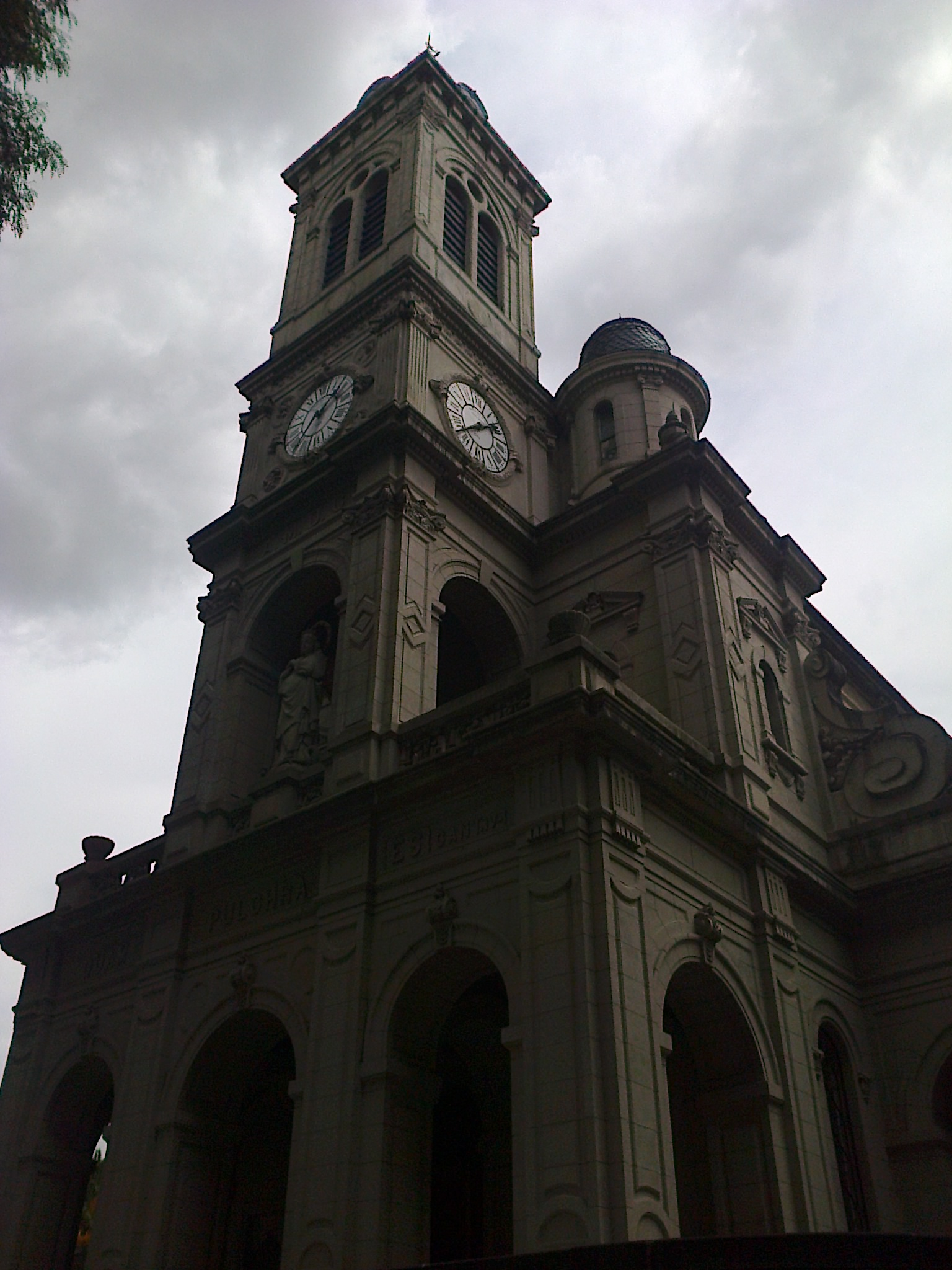

The Inmaculada Concepción Seminary is located in Villa Devoto, Buenos Aires, Argentina. Pope Francis studied in it during his youth. It was built in 1899.
