= Pedro Araújo =

Portuguese footballer

Personal information
- Full name: Pedro Manuel Martins Araújo
- Date of birth: 10 January 1985 (age 41)
- Place of birth: Barcelos, Portugal
- Height: 1.68 m (5 ft 6 in)
- Position: Left back

Youth career
- 1996–1998: Famalicão
- 1998–2003: Sporting CP

Senior career*
Years	Team	Apps	(Gls)
2003–2004	Sporting B	7	(0)
2004–2005	Olivais Moscavide	22	(0)
2005–2008	Penafiel	49	(0)
2008–2011	Beira Mar	49	(1)
2010–2011	→ Gil Vicente (loan)	7	(0)
2011–2012	Trofense	29	(3)
2012–2015	Tondela	83	(1)
2015–2017	Penafiel	40	(1)
2017–2018	Lusitanos	37	(2)

International career
2001	Portugal U15	8	(0)
2001–2002	Portugal U17	10	(1)
2002–2003	Portugal U18	5	(1)
2003	Portugal U19	2	(0)
2005–2006	Portugal U20	8	(1)
2005	Portugal U21	1	(0)
- * Club domestic league appearances and goals as of 21:53, 22 April 2020 (UTC)

Pedro Manuel Martins Araújo (born 10 January 1985) is a Portuguese professional footballer who plays as a left back.

== Club career ==
Born in Viatodos, Barcelos, Araújo joined Sporting Clube de Portugal's youth system in 1998. After making his senior debut with the B-team he signed with fellow Portuguese Second Division club C.D. Olivais e Moscavide, moving straight into the Primeira Liga with F.C. Penafiel in 2005 and making his debut in the competition on 18 September by playing the full 90 minutes in a 2–2 away draw against C.S. Marítimo.

Araújo all but competed in the Segunda Liga in the following decade. In 2012, he signed for C.D. Tondela, scoring his first goal for his new team in a 1–3 loss at F.C. Arouca.

In July 2015, after starting in all his 40 league appearances as the side promoted to the top flight for the first time in their history, Araújo returned to Penafiel.

== International career ==
Araújo earned 34 caps for Portugal at youth level, scoring three goals. He represented the nation at the 2005 Toulon Tournament.

== Club statistics ==
As of 13 November 2015

Club	Season	League			Cup		Continental		Total	
Club	Season	Division	Apps	Goals	Apps	Goals	Apps	Goals	Apps	Goals
Sporting B	2003–04	Portuguese Second Division	7	0	—		—		7	0
Olivais Moscavide	2004–05	Portuguese Second Division	22	0	1	0	—		23	0
Penafiel	2005–06	Primeira Liga	16	0	0	0	—		16	0
Penafiel	2006–07	Segunda Liga	11	0	2	0	—		13	0
Penafiel	2007–08	Segunda Liga	22	0	10	0	—		32	0
Penafiel	Total		49	0	12	0	—		61	0
Beira-Mar	2008–09	Segunda Liga	29	0	3	0	—		32	0
Beira-Mar	2009–10	Segunda Liga	20	1	7	0	—		27	1
Beira-Mar	Total		49	1	10	0	—		59	1
Gil Vicente (loan)	2010–11	Segunda Liga	7	0	2	0	—		9	0
Trofense	2011–12	Segunda Liga	29	3	5	0	—		34	3
Tondela	2012–13	Segunda Liga	34	1	4	0	—		38	1
Tondela	2013–14	Segunda Liga	9	0	0	0	—		9	0
Tondela	2014–15	Segunda Liga	40	0	3	0	—		43	0
Tondela	Total		83	1	7	0	—		90	1
Penafiel	2015–16	Segunda Liga	11	1	3	0	—		14	1
Career total			257	6	40	0	0	0	297	6

== Honours ==
Beira-Mar

- Segunda Liga: 2009–10

Gil Vicente

- Segunda Liga: 2010–11

Tondela

- Segunda Liga: 2014–15
