= Edelmiro Mayer =

Germán Edelmiro Mayer
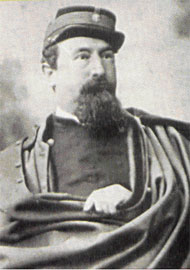
- Edelmiro Mayer (c. 1873)

Governor of the national territory of Santa Cruz
- In office 1893–1897
- Preceded by: Ramon Lista

Personal details
- Born: May 28, 1834 Buenos Aires
- Died: January 4, 1897 (aged 62) Rio Gallegos
- Profession: Soldier; Writer
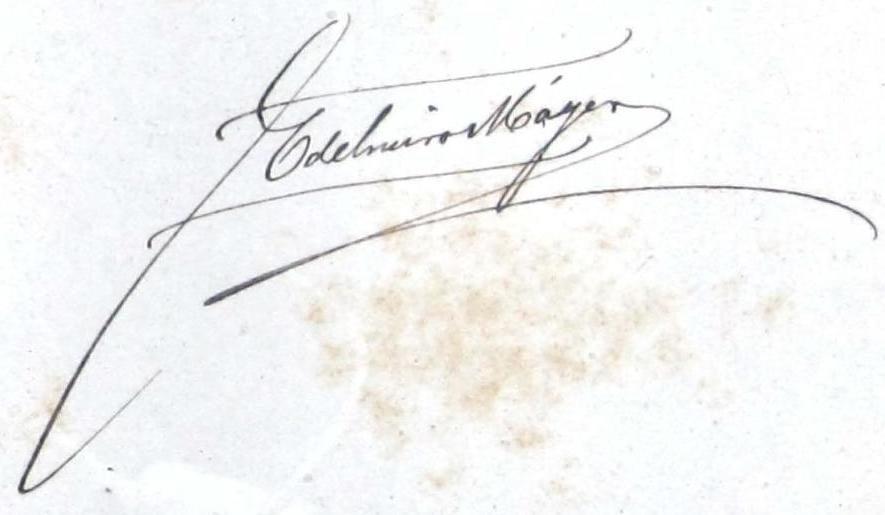
- Signature

Military service
- Allegiance: State of Buenos Aires; United States of America; Mexico
- Battles/wars: Argentine Civil Wars; American Civil War; French intervention in Mexico

Germán Edelmiro Mayer (28 May 1834 – 4 January 1897) was an Argentine soldier, writer and statesman who fought in the Argentine Civil Wars, the American Civil War and against the French intervention in Mexico. Mayer was the third governor of the national territory of Santa Cruz, being in office from 1893 until his death in 1897.

== Early life ==
Mayer was born in Buenos Aires in 1834, the son of a Hungarian typographer and a Spanish mother. At the age of 18, he settled along with his family in New York City, where he lived until 1858. Back to Argentina, he joined the State of Buenos Aires army and took part in the battles of Cepeda and Pavon against the Argentine Confederation, where he reached the rank of captain and later of major. After a dispute between his superiors, General Wenceslao Paunero and Bartolome Mitre, regarding promotions, Mayer resigned to the army and in late 1861 he returned to the United States, where his uncle owned a store.

== American Civil War ==
Hired by his uncle, he soon left business life for West Point, where he was appointed a military instructor. There, he became a friend of Robert Todd Lincoln, son of Abraham Lincoln. Mayer left the military academy to work in Lincoln Sr's law office.

During the early stages of the civil war, Mayer took sides with abolitionism, and wrote several articles in Harper's Magazine, stressing the role of African slaves' descendants in the South American Independence wars. He helped to establish a number of colored regiments. He joined the Union Army in July 1863 as a captain. Promoted to the rank of lieutenant colonel, he fought with distinction in Chattanooga, Olustee and the Siege of Petersburg, commanding the 45th U.S. Colored Infantry Regiment. At the time of Lincoln's assassination, Mayer and his men were at a party along with his friend Robert Lincoln. Mayer attended Abraham Lincoln's funeral, comforting his friend and family.

== French intervention in Mexico ==
From the United States, Mayer moved to Mexico, where he became a general in Benito Juarez's army. Regarded as a "gringo" by some of his subordinates, he killed his second in command in the course of a pistol duel. After he saved the life of French-appointed General Leonardo Márquez in the aftermath of the siege of Querétaro, in 1867, Mayer was set for execution by firing squad for treason. His own life was spared by the intervention of former President Domingo Faustino Sarmiento, then Argentina's ambassador to the United States.

== Return to Argentina ==
Mayer went back to Argentina in 1873, after a long trip across the United States (where he met Cuban patriot Jose Marti), Mexico, and Britain. His rank of general was recognized by Carlos Tejedor, governor of Buenos Aires province, and in 1875 he commanded the rebel artillery during an uprising against the federal government, led by President Nicolas Avellaneda. Following the suppression of the revolt, Mayer was forced to resign to the army. He then became a successful writer, publishing works about his military experiences, translations of Edgar Allan Poe and even a musical dictionary in 1888, where one of the first definitions of tango as a music genre is found.

== Governor of Santa Cruz ==
Undeterred by a number of ill-fated investments in shore facilities and railways, Mayer eventually purchased a ranch in Santa Cruz, then a federal territory in Patagonia region. His influence and experience led President Carlos Pellegrini to appoint him as governor in 1893, after the resignation of Ramon Lista.

Mayer played a key role in populating Santa Cruz. His policy was to expand settlements to the west, close to the Andes, in order to avoid the overpopulation of the coast. He promoted activities such as animal fats industry, ship management and the manufacture of bricks. During his time in office, several scientific expeditions were carried out through the territory led by Carlos Burmeister, Otto Nordenskjold, Clemente Onelli and Carlos Ameghino.

Mayer died suddenly while working at his office in Rio Gallegos on 4 January 1897.
