= Iberian naming customs =

Iberian naming customs are naming customs found on the Iberian Peninsula. These include:

- Portuguese naming customs
- Spanish naming customs
  - Basque names
  - Catalan names
  - Galician names

== See also ==
- Naming customs of Hispanic America
