= Susana Andrade =

Uruguayan politician and writer

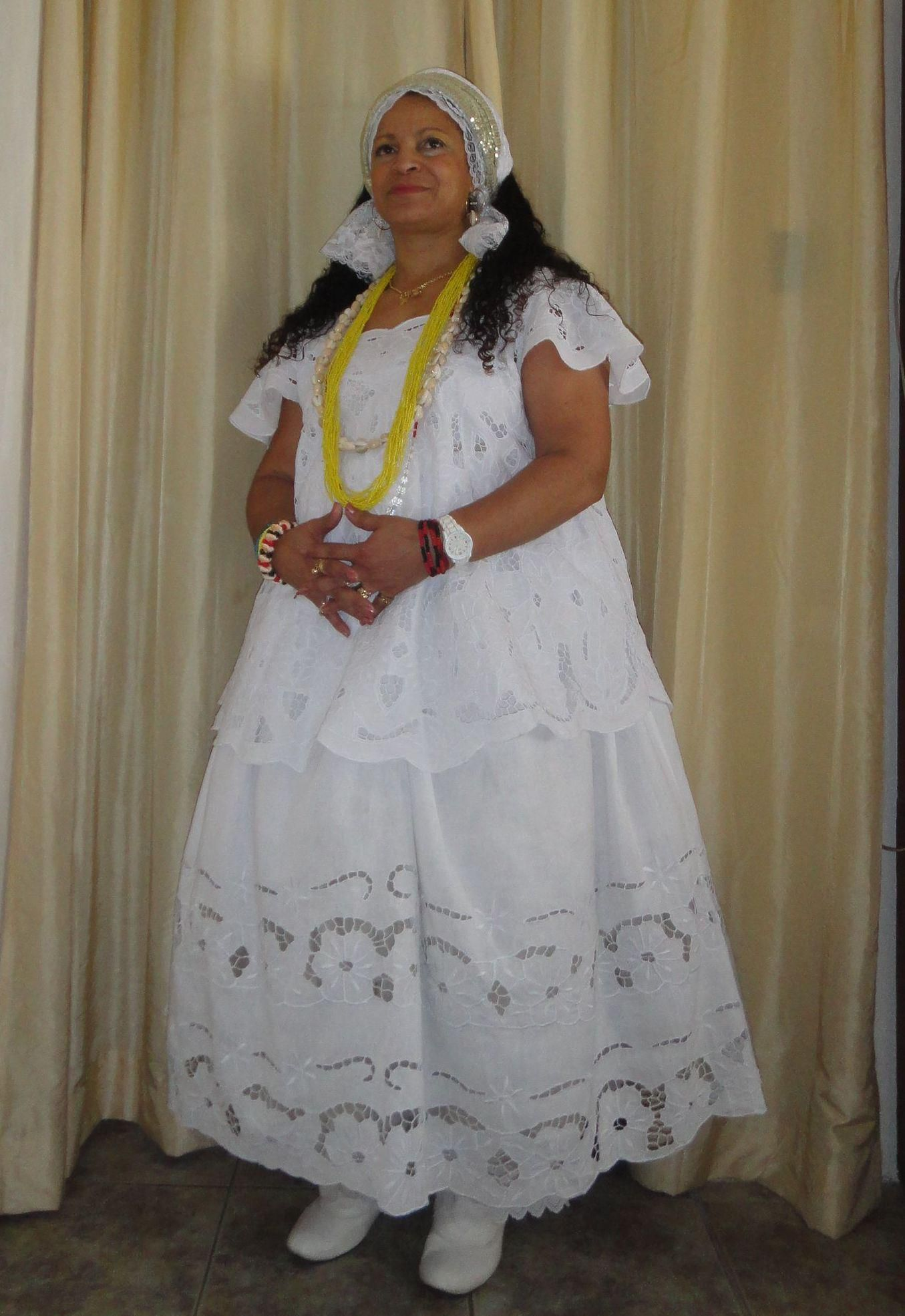
- Susana Andrade in 2018

Deputy of the Republic
- Incumbent
- Assumed office 2015

Personal details
- Born: Susana Andrade; 9 February 1963 (age 63) Montevideo, Uruguay
- Party: Broad Front
- Spouse: Julio Kronberg
- Children: Germán, Naomi
- Education: University of the Republic
- Occupation: Procurator, columnist, journalist, politician
- Website: www.maesusana.com
- Nickname: Mae Susana de Oxum

Susana Andrade (born 9 February 1963) is a Uruguayan procurator, journalist, columnist, Umbanda religious figure, and politician.

== Biography ==
Susana Andrade was born in Montevideo and has eight siblings. She studied at the Faculty of Law of the University of the Republic. She has been a columnist for the newspaper La República since 2004. She belongs to Broad Front Space List 711.

Andrade has been known as Mae Susana de Oxum in the Umbanda religion since 1991. She is the first Afro-Umbandan to hold the office of Deputy of the Republic. She is the founder of the Atabaque Group.

In 2008 she participated in the project Dueños de la encrucijada, analyzing Afro-Brazilian religious rites.

In 2015, she presented her book Mima Kumba, which deals with the "difficulties of social insertion of an Afro-Brazilian and Afro-descendant religious social militant woman." The author aggregated verses, thoughts, and her own writings.

She married Julio Kronberg, with whom she has two children, Germán and Naomi Kronberg Andrade.

== Books ==
- 2008, Dueños de la Encrucijada (collaborator)
- 2009, Entre la religión y la política
- 2015, Mima Kumba y otros encantos negros
- 2018, Resiliencia Africana
