= Hernán Andrade =

Mexican racewalker

Personal information
- Full name: Hernán Andrade Yañez
- Born: November 1, 1960 (age 65)
- Height: 1.68 m (5 ft 6 in)
- Weight: 55 kg (121 lb)

Sport
- Country: Mexico
- Sport: Athletics
- Event: Racewalking
- Updated on 25 July 2013

Hernán Andrade Yañez (born November 1, 1960) is a retired racewalker from Mexico.

He competed, but was disqualified, in the 50 kilometres races at the 1987 World Race Walking Cup 1988 Olympic Games. He competed at the 1991 World Race Walking Cup, but did not finish.

He set his personal best (3:49:38) in the men's 50 km walk event in 1988.

Andrade is currently living in Quintana Roo, as a tourism promoter

== Personal bests ==
- 50 km: 3:49:38 hrs – Mexico City, 3 April 1988

== International competitions ==
Representing Mexico
Year	Competition	Venue	Position	Event	Notes
1984	Pan American Race Walking Cup	Bucaramanga, Colombia	—	50 km	DQ
1988	Olympic Games	Seoul, South Korea	—	50 km	DQ
1988	Pan American Race Walking Cup	Mar del Plata, Argentina	—	50 km	DQ
1990	Pan American Race Walking Cup	Xalapa, Mexico	—	50 km	DNF
