= Antonio Devoto =

Conte, OCI, OSSML, OML Antonio Devoto
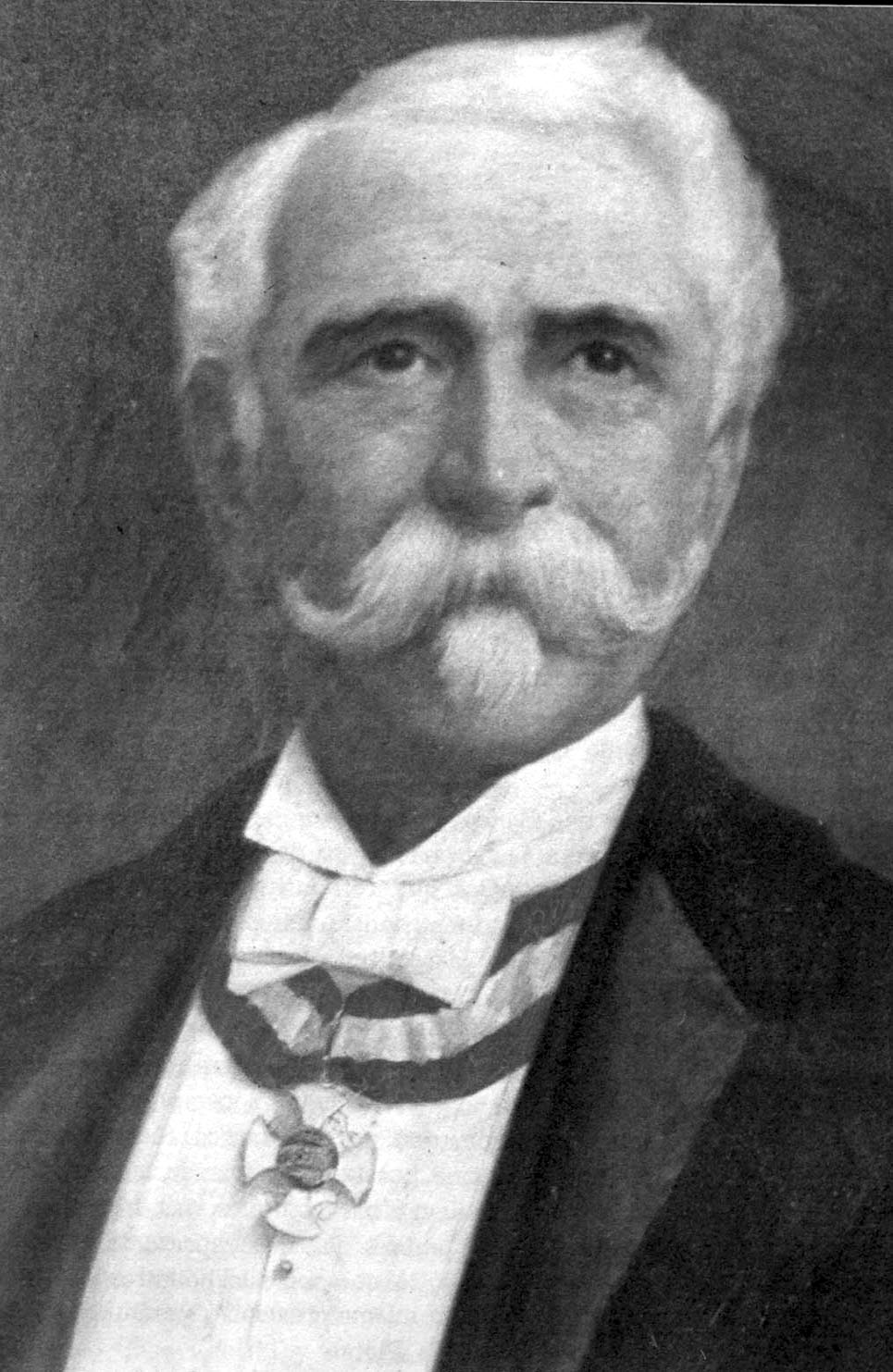
- Devoto c. 1852

Personal details
- Born: Antonio Devoto Vaccarezza; 12 March 1833 Lavagna, Liguria, Kingdom of Sardinia
- Died: 30 July 1916 (aged 82) Buenos Aires, Argentina
- Resting place: La Recoleta Cemetery, Buenos Aires
- Spouse(s): Rosa Viale (m. 1867, d. 1896); Elina Pombo (m. 1901)
- Parents: José Devoto (father); Rosa Vaccarezza (mother)
- Relatives: Cayetano, Esteban, Bartolomé & Tomás (brothers)
- Occupation: Entrepreneur, banker, philanthropist and politician
- Known for: Planning the establishment of the Abasto Market; Founding the Villa Devoto neighborhood in Buenos Aires

Conte Antonio Devoto ^{OCI, OSSML, OML} (12 March 1833 – 30 July 1916) was an Argentine entrepreneur, banker, philanthropist and politician born in Liguria. He is best known for being the owner of most of the lands in the current barrio of Buenos Aires called Villa Devoto, hence the neighborhood's name. Him and his brothers were also involved in the establishment of the Abasto Market in downtown Buenos Aires in 1888.

== Biography ==
Son of a middle-class Genoese family, the Devoto immigrated to Argentina in 1850 and were established in downtown Buenos Aires.

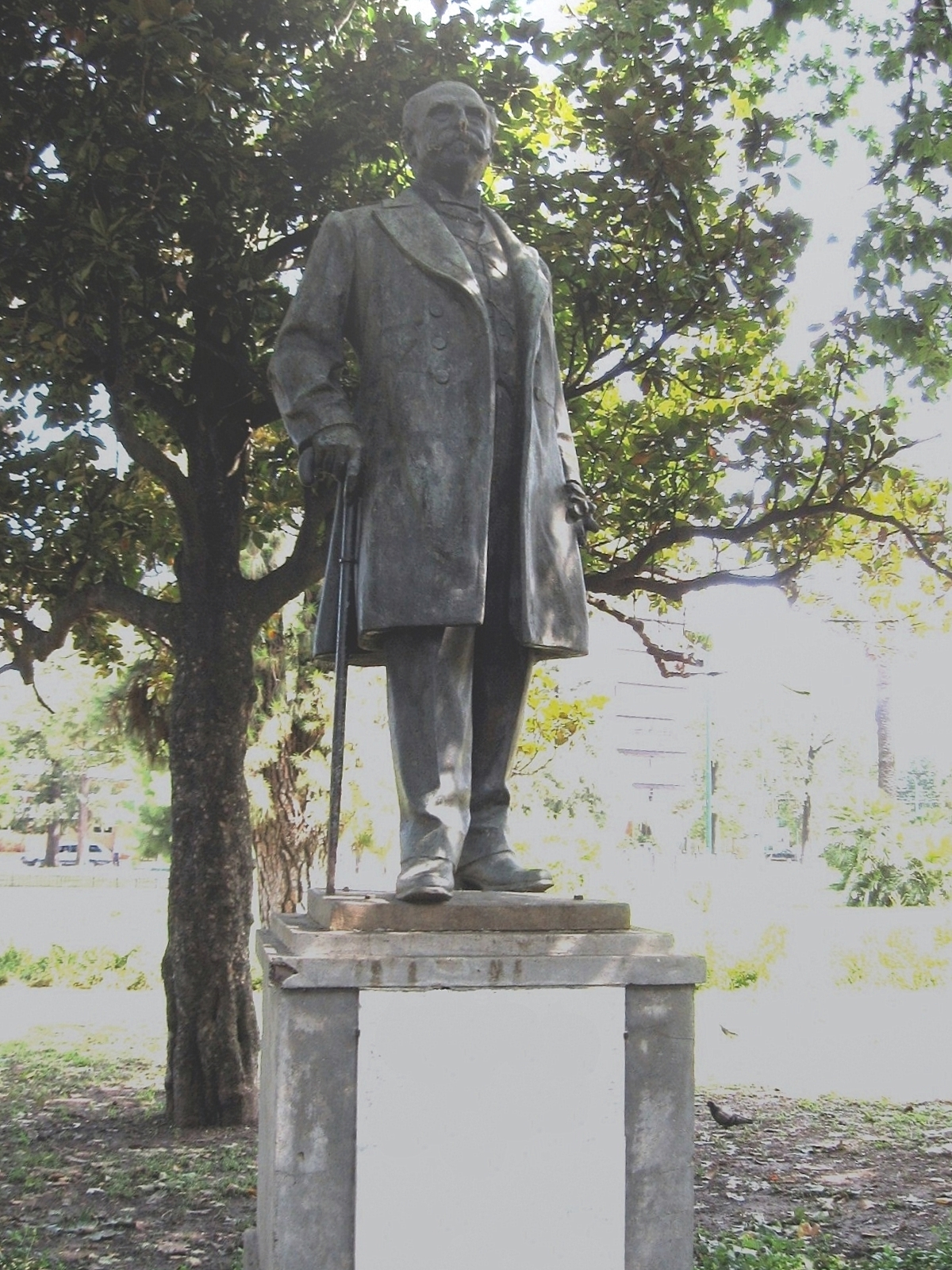
Memorial to Antonio Devoto looks on Arenales Plaza, in his namesake Villa Devoto, Buenos Aires

Don Devoto built what was the largest mansion of the city at the time and it became known as Devoto Palace —Prince Umberto Saboya stayed there during a visit to Buenos Aires—. The mansion was built on National Avenue (now called Salvador María del Carril) and occupied around 10,238 square metres. It was decorated in bronze, silver and gold with iron work forged in Italy, and Florentine mosaics.

Don Devoto died in 1916 before the work on the mansion was complete and since he did not leave any descendants, and no one could be found to buy the eccentric house, so in 1938 it was divided into building lots on which houses were later constructed.

In respect of his help to Italy during World War I, he was granted the title of count by king Victor Emmanuel III on January 23, 1916. He was also awarded other titles earlier, which are listed below:

- Knight, Commander and Grand Officer of the Order of the Crown of Italy
- Knight of the Order of St. Maurice and Lazarus
- Knight of the Order of Merit for Labour
