= Fernán Pérez de Andrade =

Galician knight

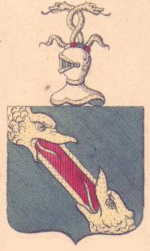
Brasao Andrade

Fernán Pérez de Andrade or Fernán Peres d'Andrade (? – 1397) was a Galician knight. His birthdate is unknown but is presumably before 1330. His death date fell between July 28 and August 21, 1397. As the fourth son of Ruy Freyre de Andrade and Inés Rodriguez de Sotomayor, he belonged to a family associated with the knights of the Orden de la Banda (Order of the Sash) since its founding by Alfonso XI of Castile in 1332. He was married to Sancha Rodríguez, (Note: The author Jose A. Garcia Ledo adds a previous wife, before Sancha, called Tareyga de Guzman, but she doesn't show in any document as such) daughter of Aras Pardo and Tareyga Affonso, and with whom he was known to have had two daughters, Maria and Inés Fernández, nuns of the Order of Saint Clare, and a son (whose name is unconfirmed, though some sources mention Nuño) who died at an early age, leaving the family without a direct male heir. (Note: His nephew Don Pedro Fernández, son of his brother Don Juan Freyre de Andrade, inherited the notorious family state)

Pires de Andrade was a knight always ready for battle. He enjoyed hunting, poetry, and chivalric books, as befitted the tastes of those days. He was a sponsor and protector of the Catholic Church, though it is well documented that he usurped the Church's properties, and abused his power in his domains when it suited him. He sided with Henry II of Castile {Enrique de Trastámara} in Henry's confrontation with his half-brother Peter in the last years of the feud, until Henry's assassination in Monteil.

After the king's death and the accession of Henry II to the throne, Fernán Pérez de Andrade continued to be influential with the monarchy and reached the status of a Lord in Galicia.

== Andrade ==
"Andrade" seems to be an old toponym of Celtic origin, according to D. Isidro Millán, but it is unknown if referred to a village or a parish. The name of the place was incorporated into the family name, and the name is mentioned in several documents dating from the twelfth century. It is possible that this name was used by unrelated individuals or families residing in the area, as is common today.

The first documented Andrades were vassals of the Traba family, along with some other Hidalgo family. They remained in the background of the social scene until the fourteenth century, when their influence in the areas of Ferrol, Vilalba, and Pontedeume increased to the point of becoming the most powerful Galician family of the time.

With Don Fernán Pérez de Andrade o Bóo (o Boo meaning "the Good" in the Galician language) - the fourth to have that name - the family achieved greater importance during the reign of Henry II. As their successor descendants continued this increase, Fernando de Andrade (1477–1540) was the one to achieve Count status, as the first Conde de Andrade; the second title of Count of Vilalba, Count of Andrade is currently in possession of the House of Alba.

Most genealogies compiled during the 19th and 20th centuries connect the Andrades to the most important families as Fróilaz-Traba. These are, however, only weak connections, and are contradictory or obscure connections, as yet unconfirmed. To further muddy the water, there are several legendary stories relating the Andrades to the knights that reached the Iberian Peninsula in the retinue of Mendo de Rausona, brother of the last Lombard king, around the eighth century.

== Fernán Pérez de Andrade, knightly atmosphere and loyalty to Pedro I ==
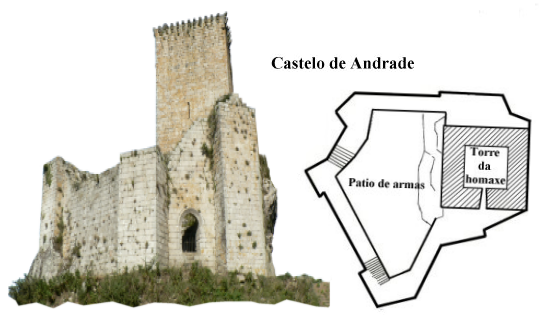
Castle of Andrade

Fernán Perez de Andrade IV descended from a family of hidalgos and knights, vassals of a lord whom they served with arms. This family environment certainly influenced Fernán Pérez de Andrade; he was always ready for battle but had a cautious and observing character in tumultuous times, with minimal romanticism. Two of his grandfather's brothers, Pedro and Fernan (the third) Perez de Andrade, were put to death in the Castillo de la Rocha in 1320; this demonstrated to the young Fernán how those were times in which it might be prudent to put caution aside and move swiftly to align oneself with the stronger parties.

The Andrades were lords of a small estate, and, as most of the lords in the peninsula, aspired to broaden their domains and promote their lineage in the service of their overlord, Don Pedro Fernández de Castro. Alfonso XI, an enthusiast of the chivalric code, fostered knights as pillars of his society, considering it necessary to bring order to his realm, and honour (and praise) to his subjects. As a result of this belief, he created the Orden de la Banda—the first secular order of the West—and reinstated the practice of investiture of Knights, creating them himself by drawing on the vassals of his kingdom. Pedro Fernández de Castro invested thirteen of his vassals as Knights of the Orden de la Banda on September 10, 1332. Among them were Nuño and Rui Freyre de Andrade, uncle and father of Fernán Pérez de Andrade (IV). (Libro de Ordenamiento de Banda-Crónica de Alfonso XI).

Fernán Pérez de Andrade, listed as squire in several documents of this time, obtained his first concessions in 1356 from the hands of Henry, by then Count of Trastámara. He was married to Sancha Rodríguez, the only legitimate daughter of Aras Pardo, who was also a knight of the Orden de la Banda, which augmented his social status. This served as the beginning of his career, which had been hindered by his partisan support for Henry against Henry's half-brother, Peter I, for the throne.

In the beginning of the war between the brothers, circumstances were confusing and unclear. Many knights sided with the mutinous, and Fernán Pérez seems to be one of them, following the allegiances of his natural overlord, Don Fernando Ruíz de Castro, who sided against Peter since the early stages of the confrontation.

Later, Fernando Ruíz de Castro switched allegiance to King Peter. Fernán Pérez de Andrade's fate is unclear, although Henry's exile between 1356 and 1566 makes it unlikely that Fernán supported Henry wholly. While Fernán Pérez fought beside King Peter in his campaign against Aragon in 1357, some authors cite his support for Henry, although Henry had fled to Asturias from Ferrol in 1356.

During the years leading up to 1362, Fernán Pérez achieved considerable wealth, largely due to inheritances from his family, lands, and other mercies received from Henry, Count of Trastámara, and his marriage with Sancha. He also obtained an important privilege (Note: Privilege of Murviedo, thru which he receives the villages of Pontedeume and Vilalba) from King Peter in 1364, which increased his estates considerably, therefore strengthening his feudal power.

== Change of loyalty and the events of Montiel ==
Fernán Pérez later sided with Enrique, Peter seeming to have lost the war. Fernan probably fought by Henry's side previously in the Battle of Nájera in 1367 but few accounts remain of his achievements or of the battle's aftermath. Two years later, on the night of 22 or 23 March 1369, King Peter died in Montiel, in an act of treachery by his half-brother Henry. Several knights were involved, possibly including Fernán Pérez de Andrade though this cannot be demonstrated.

Henry's troops marched alongside those of Bertrand du Guesclin, French knight and leader of the free companies (Compañías Blancas) which arrived from France. The besieged King Henry tried to negotiate his escape with Bertrand du Guesclin, and escorted by two of his men, went to the tent of the Frenchman, where Henry happened to be. It is not certain whether it was Bertrand himself who called Henry, or it was another knight who learned Henry was trying to flee the scene of the siege. Whatever the reason for Henry's presence in Bertrand's tent, Henry and Peter engaged in hand-to-hand combat. Some authors say one of the knights present helped Henry by restraining Peter, but it seems unlikely that Bertrand du Guesclin was involved in this murder beyond the fact that it happened in his tent, as his reputation for bravery and honour had been proven in the past and assisting in Peter's death would be inconsistent with this.

Several say (Note: Bartolome Sagrario Molina y Frey Felipe de Gandara) that the treacherous restraint of Peter, meant to be involved in to one fight, inspired the well-known quote in Spain "Ni quito ni pongo rey, pero ayudo a mi señor" ("I'm not deposing nor proposing a King, but I am helping my lord") is more in line with Fernán Pérez's attitude, than with that of Bertrand du Guesclin, whose "my lord" wouldn't help Henry, but rather the King of France. All the copious endowments and benefits enjoyed by Fernán after the death of King Peter could very well be in payment for the well-timed help inside the tent.

Regardless of the lack of irrefutable proof of the level of Fernán's involvement in King Peter's death, documents of the time would seem to indicate his guilty remorse, which might indicate proof of this.

== Social progress and new fights ==
Subsequently, Fernán Pérez acted as a great lord, and it is likely that he was a knight at this time, probably having been knighted between 1369 and 1371. He began constructing the Castle of Nogueirosa, confronting the prior of the monastery of Sobrado to whom the lands surrounding the castle belonged. Fernán Pérez acted without scruples, inspiring gear according to the chronicles, and letting his violent character show. He permanently abandoned the pre-existing family castle to rule his domain from the new Castle of Nogueirosa.

The wars had not ended in Galicia. After Henry (Henry II of Castile) rose to the throne, several "petristas", or knights favouring Peter, offered the throne to Ferdinand I of Portugal. The old petrista Fernando Ruiz de Castro is reported as the instigator behind this, as his enmity towards Henry continued even after Peter's death.

Henry, hearing of these maneuvers, returned to Galicia with Bertrand du Guesclin and other knights, Fernán Pérez de Andrade among them. Together, they forced Don Fernando back to Portugal. The brother of Fernán Pérez, Nuño Freyre, who was Master of the Order of Christ supported the cause of the Portuguese, so on being defeated had to leave Galicia.

The war ended between 1371 and 1373 with several treaties in which Fernando Ruíz de Castro was exhorted to exile in Baiona. During this period, Fernán Pérez received several more grants of land, and became lord of the villages of Ferrol, Pontedeume, and Vilalba, with rights over those villages that until then only were for the king himself. Fernán Pérez was the right-hand man of King Henry in Galicia, to the point that he was appointed to make all the preparations for the wedding of Henry's son, Fadrique with Beatrice of Portugal.

In 1371, he was appointed Governor of A Coruña. In 1384, he took part in the dynastic clash between John I of Castile and John I of Portugal. In 1386 he fought John of Gaunt, Duke of Lancaster in a new dynastic war in Castile and he defended A Coruña, although it is unclear whether he defended the city or turned it over to John of Gaunt. The war ended with the marriage of Catalina, daughter of the Duke of Lancaster and granddaughter of Peter I of Castile, Peter the Cruel to Henry (to be Henry III), and Fernán Pérez regained control of A Coruña.

Fernan reached his "social zenith" around 1391 when after his first wife's death, he had already remarried Constanza Moscoso, of an important family of Galician knights, which helped bolster his good social standing.

Fernán Pérez de Andrade held several royal commissions in public office until the end of his life, and left behind a bigger patrimony than that received from his ancestors, placing his lineage as one of the most prominent of the Galician landscape.

== Some works ==
Don Fernán Pérez de Andrade was an educated man, by the standards of knighthood of the day, and was concerned with his reputation, both at the time and in the future. To indicate his power and wealth, he developed several castles in his lands. He also worried about his name being important among the lineages of the others later in time, so he commissioned civil works and religious buildings that still stand today.

The later public works included seven bridges, of which three still stand, one over the river Tambre, three meters wide and with a single ogival arch, another over the river Eume which spanned 913 meters and was known to have 79 arches, large enough to contain on its span a hospital with twelve beds and a chapel. Additionally, the Castle of Nogueirosa survives partially, and the Homage Tower of the old castillo de Andrade which is 12 meters wide and stands 18 meters tall. Fernan also sponsored several churches, including the Church of San Francisco and Santa María de Azougue in Betanzos, and he sponsored the foundations of San Pantaleon de Cabanas, Santa Maria de Cabanas, and San Paulo de Riobarba.

== Conclusions ==
Fernán Pérez de Andrade was a knight who lived by the standards of his time: he followed the knightly model by adjusting it to his own interests. Even though he was given the nickname of “o Bóo”, Galician for "The good one", we must not overlook his abusive behaviour and lack of scruples, and his talent for siding with the winning party in a way that benefited him. He is remembered nonetheless as a great sponsor and a loyal knight of Enrique, being the first knight of the family to attain Lord status, promoting a lineage that would later reach Count status, as the Counts of Andrade.

== Bibliography ==
- Correa Arias, Jose Francisco (2004). Fernán Pérez de Andrade, o Bóo (in Spanish). La Coruña: Ed. Toxosoutos SL.
- Lopez Sangil y Castro Alvarez. La genealogia de los Andrade (in Spanish).
- "n. 13 y n. 12.", CATEDRA
- Correa Arias, Jose Fco. O simbolico e o imaxinario do mundo sensorial. Los Andrade (in Spanish).
- Garcia Oro, Jose (1999). Galicia en la baja Edad Media. La Coruña.
- Luengo y Martinez, Jose Maria. Los restos mortales de Fernan Perez de Andrade.
