= Agustina Andrade =

Argentine poet

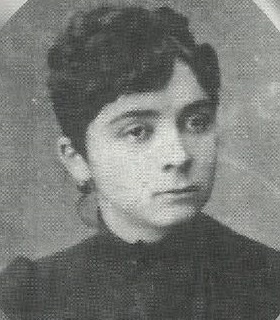

Agustina Pastora Andrade (9 August 1858 – 10 February 1891) was an Argentine poet, considered to be one of the principal writers of the Generation of '80, and "probably the most praised female poet of the 1870s". The daughter of the poet Olegario Victor Andrade, her poems were praised by poet and journalist Martín Coronado for their "idealized romantic love".

Andrade was married to the military officer and explorer Ramón Lista. In 1890, Andrade learned that her husband maintained a parallel family in Patagonia with an indigenous Tehuelche woman called Koila, with whom he had a daughter. She reacted by isolating herself within her house for months, and then committed suicide with a revolver.

== Early life and work ==
Agustina Andrade was born in Gualeguaychú, Entre Ríos on 9 August 1858 (or 1861) in the town of Gualeguaychú, in the province of Entre Ríos. She was the daughter of the poet Olegario Victor Andrade and Maria Eloisa Quiñones González. Interested in poetry from a young age, she began to publish her work by 16. With her father and the young Leandro N. Alem, Andrade worked on Álbum poético argentino, released in 1877. Encouraged by her father, she began publishing her poems in La Tribuna, forming a distinct poetic style, clearly influenced by Victor Hugo and Gustavo Adolfo Bécquer. In 1878, she published the volume Lágrimas, and the following year authored Flor de un día. Her poems were praised by the likes of Benigno Tejeiro Martínez and Martín Coronado for their "idealized romantic love". In his Poesías (1877), the poet Gervasio Méndez includes the poem, ¿Cuándo vuelves á tu patria? A mi simpática amiga Agustina Andrade (When will you return to your country? To my good friend, Agustina Andrade). Andrade's poem La Fé was described as a "revelation".

== Personal life ==
Andrade met the military officer and explorer Ramón Lista (1856–1897). In 1879, they married in Buenos Aires. Lista left the Territorio Nacional de Santa Cruz, where he became the second governor, while Andrade lived in Temperley, about twenty kilometers from the city of Buenos Aires. Although they did not see much of each other, the couple had two daughters. In 1890, Andrade learned that her husband maintained a parallel family in Patagonia with an indigenous Tehuelche woman called Koila, with whom he had a daughter. Heartbroken, she locked herself in the house for months on end, before leaving her two daughters in the care of her mother and committing suicide with a revolver on 10 February 1891. She is buried in the La Recoleta Cemetery in Buenos Aires.

== See also ==
- Lists of writers
