= Devoto Palace =

In the 19th century, Don Antonio Devoto built in Buenos Aires what was the largest mansion at the time and it became known as the Devoto Palace —Prince Umberto Saboya stayed there during a visit to Buenos Aires. The mansion was built on National Avenue and occupied around 10,238 square metres (110,200 sq ft). The mansion was decorated in bronze, silver and gold with iron work forged in Italy, and fiorentinos mosaics.

Don Devoto died in 1916 before the work on the mansion was complete and since he did not leave any descendants, and no one could be found to buy the eccentric house, so in 1938 it was divided into building lots on which houses were later constructed.
