= Olegario Víctor Andrade =

Argentine journalist, poet, and politician

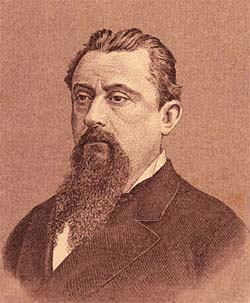
- Born: 6 March 1839; Rio Grande do Sul, Brazil
- Died: 30 October 1882 (aged 43); Buenos Aires, Argentina
- Resting place: La Recoleta Cemetery
- Occupations: Poet, journalist, and politician
- Spouse: Maria Eloísa González Quiñones (1857)
- Children: Agustina Andrade; Elloísa Andrade; Mariano Andrade; Olegario Andrade; Lelia Andrade

Olegario Víctor Andrade (1839–1882) was an Argentine journalist, poet and politician, who was born in Brazil. His daughter, Agustina Andrade, was also a poet.

== Works ==
- Prometheus, book published in 1878
  The nest of condors (El nido de cóndores)(1881) (In the black darkness stands)
- The Lost Harp (El arpa perdida)
- Prometheus (Prometeo)
- Atlantis (Atlántida)
- San Martin (1878) (not born torrents)
