= Kingdom of Galicia =

Kingdom in Iberia from 910 to 1833

Coordinates: 42°52′57″N 8°32′28″W

Kingdom of Galicia Reino de Galizia (Galician) Reino de Galicia (Spanish) Reino da Galiza (Portuguese) Galliciense Regnum (Latin)
- 910–1833
- Flag (c. 1282) Coat of arms
- Motto: Hoc hic misterium fidei firmiter profitemur (Latin) Here is the mystery of faith that we strongly profess
- Anthem: Marcha do Antigo Reino de Galiza ("Antiga Marcha do Reino de Galicia")
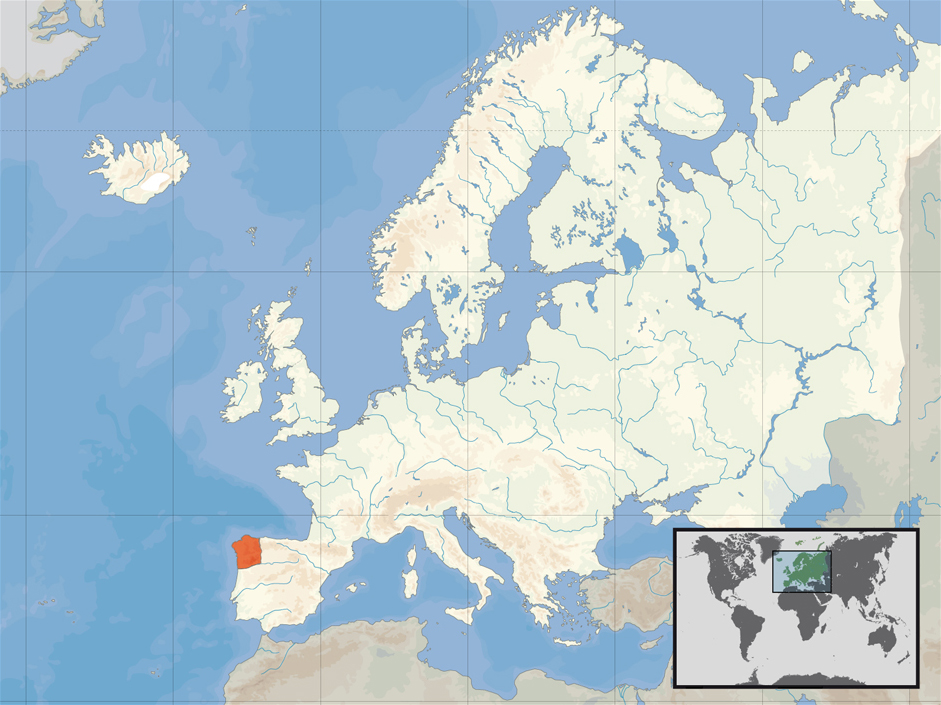
- The location of the Kingdom of Galicia in the 11th century CE, in red
- Status: State union
- Capital: Santiago de Compostela^{1}
- Common languages: Latin; Vulgar Latin; Galician-Portuguese; Astur-Leonese; Old Spanish; A few speakers of Brittonic, Visigothic, Vandalic and Suebic
- Religion: Roman Catholicism (official)
- Government: Monarchy
- Monarch
  - 910–924: Ordoño II (first)
  - 1813–1833: Ferdinand VII (last)
- Legislature: Junta
- History
  - Established: 910
  - Dissolved: 1833
Preceded by
Kingdom of Asturias
Succeeded by
Kingdom of León
Kingdom of Spain
County of Portugal
Couto Misto
- ^{1} Previously Lugo and Braga. From the 16th century, the capital was disputed.

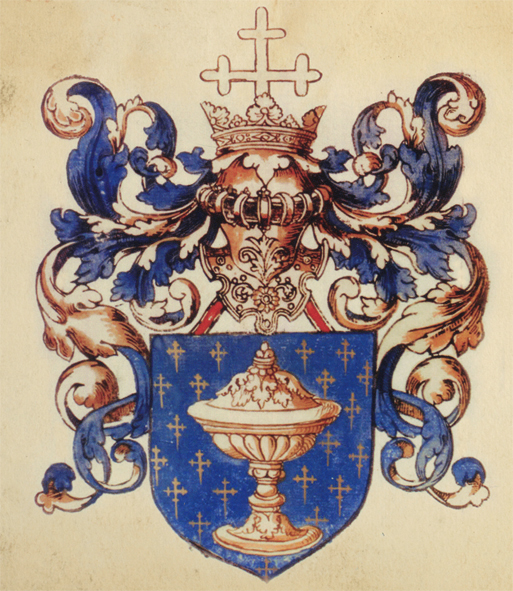
Arms of the Kingdom of Galicia, illustrated in L´armorial Le Blancq, Bibliothèque nationale de France, 1560

The Kingdom of Galicia was a political entity located in southwestern Europe, which, at its territorial zenith, occupied the entire northwest of the Iberian Peninsula. In the early 10th century, the Kingdom of Galicia was formed following the division of the Kingdom of Asturias after the death of Alfonso III in 910. His sons split the kingdom, with Ordoño II inheriting Galicia. While Galicia became a distinct political entity, it remained closely tied to the Leonese and Asturian realms through dynastic connections. Later, Ordoño II integrated Galicia into the Kingdom of León when he inherited the latter. Though the Kingdom of Galicia had moments of semi-independence, it was typically seen as part of the Kingdom of León. Santiago de Compostela became the capital of Galicia in the 11th century, while the independence of Portugal (1128) determined its southern boundary. The accession of Castilian King Ferdinand III to the Leonese kingdom in 1230 brought Galicia under the control of the Crown of Castile.

Galicia resisted central control and supported a series of alternative claimants, including John of León, Galicia and Seville (1296), Ferdinand I of Portugal (1369) and John of Gaunt (1386) and was not brought firmly into submission until the Catholic Monarchs imposed the Santa Hermandad in Galicia. The Kingdom of Galicia was then administered within the Crown of Castile (1490–1715) and later the Crown of Spain (1715–1833) by an Audiencia Real directed by a Governor which also held the office of Captain General and President. The representative assembly of the Kingdom was then the Junta or Cortes of the Kingdom of Galicia, which briefly declared itself sovereign when Galicia remained free of Napoleonic occupation (except during January–July 1809). The kingdom and its Junta were dissolved by Maria Cristina of Bourbon-Two Sicilies, Regent of Spain, in 1834.

== Origin and foundation (409) ==
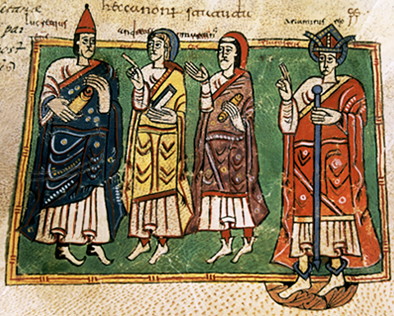
Theodemar (or Ariamir), king of Galicia with the bishops Lucrecio, Andrew, and Martin. Codex Vigilanus (or Albeldensis), Escurial library

The origin of the kingdom lies in the 5th century, when the Suebi settled permanently in the former Roman province of Gallaecia. Their king, Hermeric, probably signed a foedus, or pact, with the Roman Emperor Honorius, which conceded them lands in Galicia. The Suebi set their capital in the former Bracara Augusta and set the foundations of a kingdom, which was first acknowledged as Regnum Suevorum (Kingdom of the Suebi) but later as Regnum Galliciense (Kingdom of Galicia).

A century later, the differences between Gallaeci and Suebi people had faded, which led to the systematic use of terms like Galliciense Regnum (Galician Kingdom), Regem Galliciae (King of Galicia), Rege Suevorum (King of Suebi), and Galleciae totius provinciae rex (king of all Galician provinces), while bishops, such as Martin of Braga, were recognized as episcopi Gallaecia (Bishop of Galicia).

== Suebic Kingdom (409–585) ==
The independent Suebic kingdom of Galicia lasted from 409 to 585, having remained relatively stable for most of that time.

=== 5th century ===
In 409 Gallaecia was divided, ad habitandum, between two Germanic people, the Hasdingi Vandals, who settled the eastern lands, and the Suebi, who established themselves in the coastal areas. As with most Germanic invasions, the number of the original Suebi is estimated to be relatively low, generally fewer than 100,000, and most often around 30,000 people. They settled mainly in the regions around modern northern Portugal and Western Galicia, in the towns of Braga (Bracara Augusta) and Porto, and later in Lugo (Lucus Augusta) and Astorga (Asturica Augusta). The valley of the Limia (or Lima) River is thought to have received the largest concentration of Germanic settlers, and Bracara Augusta—the modern city of Braga—became the capital of the Suebi, as it had previously been the capital of Gallaecia.

In 419 a war broke out between the Vandal king Gunderic and the Suebi's Hermeric. After a blockade alongside the Nervasian Mountains, the Suebi obtained Roman help, forcing the Vandals to flee into the Baetica. In the absence of competitors, the Suebi began a period of expansion, first inside Gallaecia, and later into other Roman provinces. In 438 Hermeric ratified a peace treaty with the Gallaeci, the native and partially Romanized people.

Illness led Hermeric to abdicate in favor of his son, Rechila, who moved his troops to the south and the east, conquering Mérida and Seville, the capitals of the Roman provinces of Lusitania and Betica. In 448 Rechila died, leaving the expanding state to his son Rechiar, who in 449 became the first Germanic kings of post-Roman Europe to convert to Nicene Christianity. Rechiar married a Visigothic princess, and was also the first Germanic king to mint coins in ancient Roman territories. Rechiar led further expansions to the east, marauding through the Provincia Tarraconensis, which was still held by Rome. The Roman emperor Avitus sent a large army of foederates, under the direction of the Visigoth Theoderic II, who defeated the Suebi army by the river Órbigo, near modern-day Astorga. Rechiar fled, but he was pursued and captured, then executed in 457.

In the aftermath of Rechiar's death, multiple candidates for the throne appeared, finally grouping into two allegiances. The division between the two groups was marked by the Minius River (now Minho River), probably as a consequence of the localities of the Quadi and Marcomanni tribes, who constituted the Suebi nation on the Iberian Peninsula. The Suebi in the north conquered Lugo, proceeding to use that city as their co-capital, while the Suebi in the south expanded into Lisbon and Conimbriga, which were assaulted, and abandoned after their Roman inhabitants were banished. By 465 Remismund, who established a policy of friendship with the Goths and promoted the conversion of his own people into Arianism, was recognized by his people as the only king of the Suebi.

=== 6th century ===
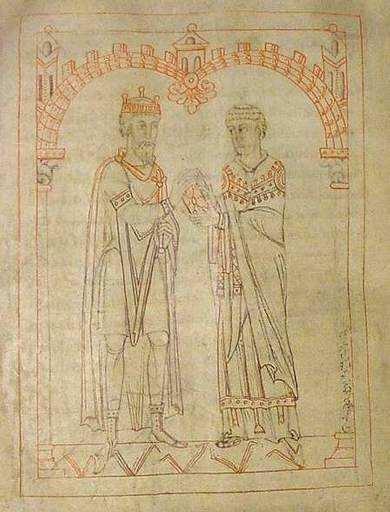
Miro, king of Galicia, and Martin of Braga, from an 1145 manuscript of Martin's Formula Vitae Honestae, now in the Austrian National Library. The book was originally dedicated to King Miro with the header "To King Miro, the most glorious and calm, the pious, distinguished for his Catholic faith"

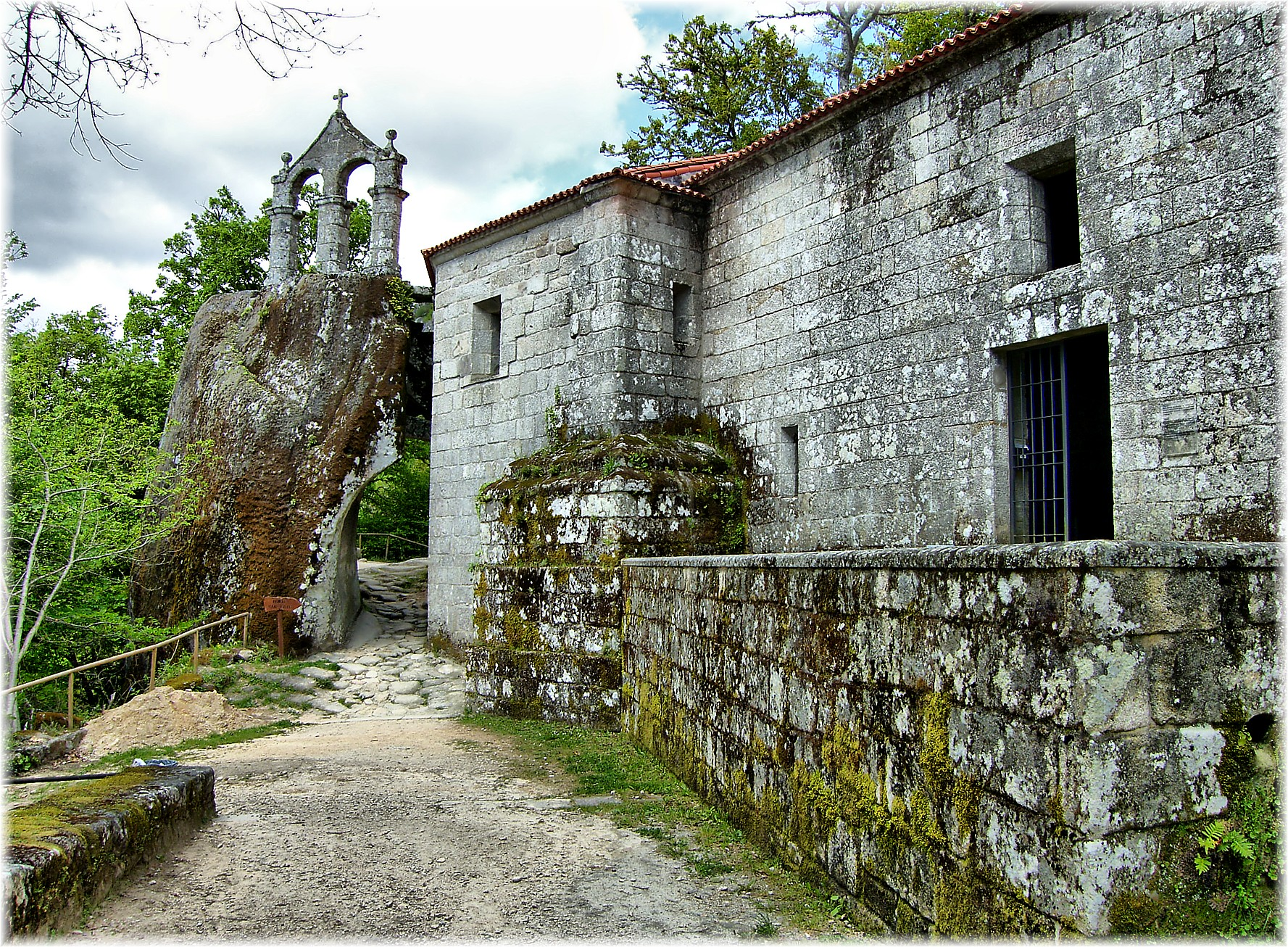
Monastery of San Pedro de Rocas, Galicia, founded in 575 and inhabited until the early 20th century

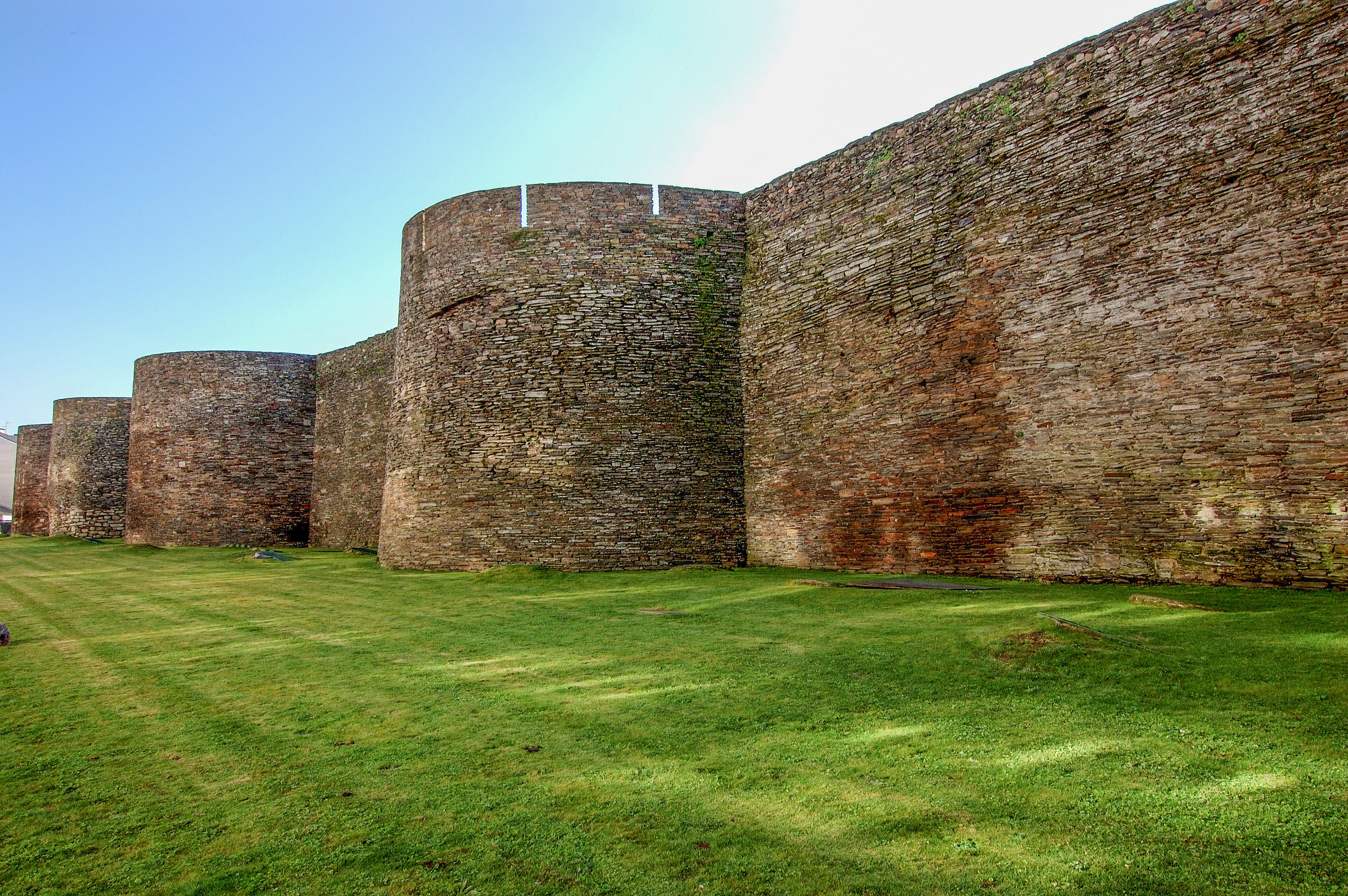
Roman walls of Lugo

After a period of obscurity, with little remaining information on the history of this area, or in fact Western Europe in general, the Suebi Kingdom reappears in European politics and history during the second half of the 6th century. This is following the arrival of Saint Martin of Braga, a Pannonian monk dedicated to converting the Suebi to Nicene Christianity and consequently into allegiance with the other Nicene Christian regional powers, the Franks and the Eastern Roman Empire.

Under King Ariamir, who called for the First Council of Braga, the conversion of the Suebi to Nicene Christianity was apparent; while this same council condemned Priscillianism, it made no similar statement on Arianism. Later, King Theodemar ordered an administrative and ecclesiastical division of his kingdom, with the creation of new bishoprics and the promotion of Lugo, which possessed a large Suebi community, to the level of Metropolitan Bishop along with Braga.

Theodemar's son and successor, King Miro, called for the Second Council of Braga, which was attended by all the bishops of the kingdom, from the Briton bishopric of Britonia in the Bay of Biscay, to Astorga in the east, and Coimbra and Idanha in the south. Five of the attendant bishops used Germanic names, showing the integration of the different communities of the country. King Miro also promoted contention with the Arian Visigoths, who under the leadership of King Leovigild were rebuilding their fragmented kingdom which had been ruled mostly by Ostrogoths since the beginning of the 6th century, following the defeat and expulsion of Aquitania by the Franks. After clashing in frontier lands, Miro and Leovigild agreed upon a temporary peace.

The Suebi maintained their independence until 585, when Leovigild, on the pretext of conflict over the succession, invaded the Suebic kingdom and finally defeated it. Audeca, the last king of the Suebi, who had deposed his brother-in-law Eboric, held out for a year before being captured in 585. This same year a nobleman named Malaric rebelled against the Goths, but he was defeated.

As with the Visigothic language, there are only traces of the Suebi tongue remaining, as they quickly adopted the local vulgar Latin. Some words of plausible Suebi origin are the modern Galician and Portuguese words laverca (lark), meixengra or mejengra (titmouse), lobio (vine), escá (a measure, formerly "cup"), groba (ravine), and others. Much more significant was their contribution to names of the local toponymy and onomastics.

The historiography of the Suebi, and of Galicia in general, was long marginalized in Spanish culture, with the first connected history of the Suebi in Galicia being written by a German scholar.

== Visigothic monarchy (585–711) ==
"After the death of Miro king of Galicia, and while his son Eboric and his son-in-law Audeca were fighting each other for the control of the kingdom, Leovigild subjugated the Suebi and all of Galicia under the power of the Goths." Chronicle of Fredegar, III. p 116.

"Not only the conversion of the Goths is found among the favors that we have received, but also the infinite multitude of the Sueves, whom with divine assistance we have subjected to our realm. Although led into heresy by others fault, with our diligence we have brought them to the origins of truth. Therefore, most holy fathers, these most noble nations gained by us, as a holy and atoning sacrifice, by your hands I offer to God eternal." King Reccared, Acts of the Third Council of Toledo.

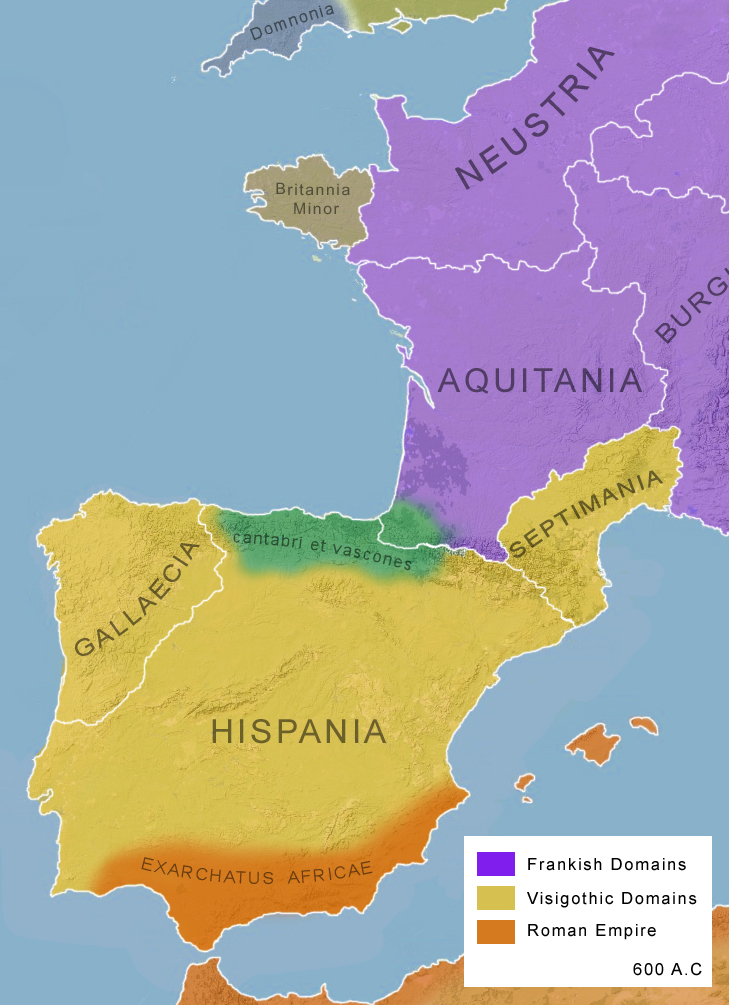
Political map of southwestern Europe around the year 600, which referred to three different areas under Visigothic government: Hispania, Gallaecia, and Septimania.

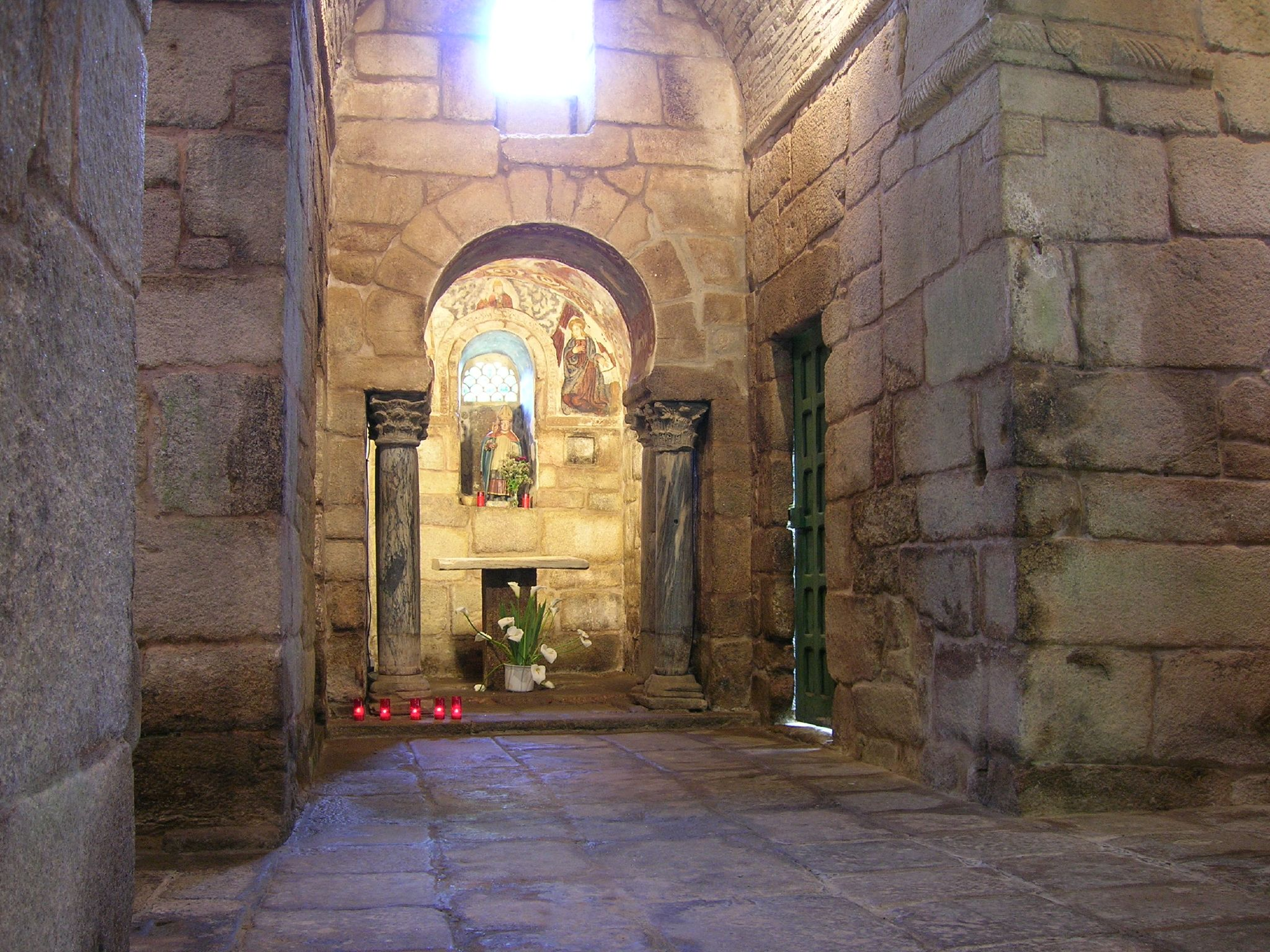
Church of Santa Comba de Bande, built c. 7th century, rebuilt in the 9th century after being ruined for more than 200 years.

In 585, Liuvigild, the Visigothic king of Hispania and Septimania, annexed the Kingdom of Galicia, after defeating King Audeca, and later the pretender to the throne, Malaric. Thus the kingdom of the Suebi, which incorporated large territories of the ancient Roman provinces of Gallaecia and Lusitania, became the sixth province of the Visigothic Kingdom of Toledo.

The government of the Visigoths in Galicia did not totally disrupt the society, and the Suevi Catholic dioceses of Bracara, Dumio, Portus Cale or Magneto, Tude, Iria, Britonia, Lucus, Auria, Asturica, Conimbria, Lameco, Viseu, and Egitania continued to operate normally. During the reign of Liuvigild, new Arian bishops were raised among the Suebi in cities such as Lugo, Porto, Tui, and Viseu, alongside the cities' Catholic bishops. These Arian bishops returned to Catholicism in 589, when King Reccared himself converted to Catholicism, along with the Goths and Suebi, at the Third Council of Toledo.

The territorial and administrative organization inherited from the Suevi was incorporated into the new Provincial status, although Lugo was reduced again to the category of bishopric, and subjected to Braga. Meanwhile, the Suevi, Roman, and Galician cultural, religious, and aristocratic elite accepted new monarchs. The peasants maintained a collective formed mostly by freemen and serfs of Celtic, Roman and Suebi extraction, as no major Visigoth immigration occurred during the 6th and 7th centuries.

This continuity led to the persistence of Galicia as a differentiated province within the realm, as indicated by the acts of several Councils of Toledo, chronicles such as that of John of Biclar, and in military laws such as the one extolled by Wamba which was incorporated into the Liber Iudicum, the Visigothic legal code. It was not until the administrative reformation produced during the reign of Recceswinth that the Lusitanian dioceses annexed by the Suevi to Galicia (Coimbra, Idanha, Lamego, Viseu, and parts of Salamanca) were restored to Lusitania. This same reform reduced the number of mints in Galicia from a few dozen to just three, those in the cities of Lugo, Braga, and Tui.

The most notable person of 7th century Galicia was Saint Fructuosus of Braga. Fructuosus was the son of a provincial Visigoth dux (military provincial governor), and was known for the foundations he established throughout the west of the Iberian Peninsula, generally in places with difficult access, such as mountain valleys or islands. He also wrote two monastic rulebooks, characterized by their pact-like nature, with the monastic communities ruled by an abbot, under the remote authority of a bishop (episcopus sub regula), and each integrant of the congregation having signed a written pact with him. Fructuosus was later consecrated as abbot-bishop of Dumio, the most important monastery of Gallaecia—founded by Martin of Braga in the 6th century—under Suebi rule. In 656 he was appointed bishop of Braga and metropolitan of Galicia, ostensibly against his own will.

During his later years the Visigothic monarchy suffered a pronounced decline, due in large part to a decrease in trade and therefore a sharp reduction in monetary circulation, largely as a result of the Muslim occupations in the early 8th century in the south Mediterranean. The Gallaecia were also affected, and Fructuosus of Braga denounced the general cultural decline and loss of the momentum from previous periods, causing some discontent in the Galician high clergy. At the tenth Council of Toledo in 656, Fructuosus was appointed to the Metropolitan seat of Potamio after the renunciation of its previous occupier. At the same time the Will of the Bishop of Dume Recimiro was declared void after he donated the wealth of the diocese convent to the poor.

The crisis at the end of the Visigoth era dates to the reign of Egica. The monarch appointed his son Wittiza as his heir, and despite the fact that the Visigothic monarchy had been traditionally elective rather than hereditary Egica associated Wittiza during his lifetime to the throne (for example, Egica and Wittiza are known to have issued coinage with the confronted effigies of both monarchs). In 701 an outbreak of plague spread westward from Greece to Spain, reaching Toledo, the Visigothic capital, in the same year, and having such impact that the royal family, including Egica and Wittiza, fled. It has been suggested that this provided the occasion for sending Wittiza to rule the Kingdom of the Suevi from Tui, which is recorded as his capital. The possibility has also been raised that the 13th-century chronicler, Lucas of Tuy, when he records that Wittiza relieved the oppression of the Jews (a fact unknown from his reign at Toledo after his father), may in fact refer to his reign at Lucas' hometown of Tui, where an oral tradition may have been preserved of the events of his Galician reign.

In 702, with the death of Egica, Wittiza as sole king moved his capital to Toledo. In 710, part of the Visigothic aristocracy violently raised Roderic to the throne, triggering a civil war with the supporters of Wittiza and his sons. In 711, the enemies of Roderic got a Muslim army to cross the Straits of Gibraltar and face him at the Battle of Guadalete. The defeat was the end of Roderic and of the Visigothic rule, with profound consequences for the whole of the Iberian peninsula.

== Early and High Middle Ages ==
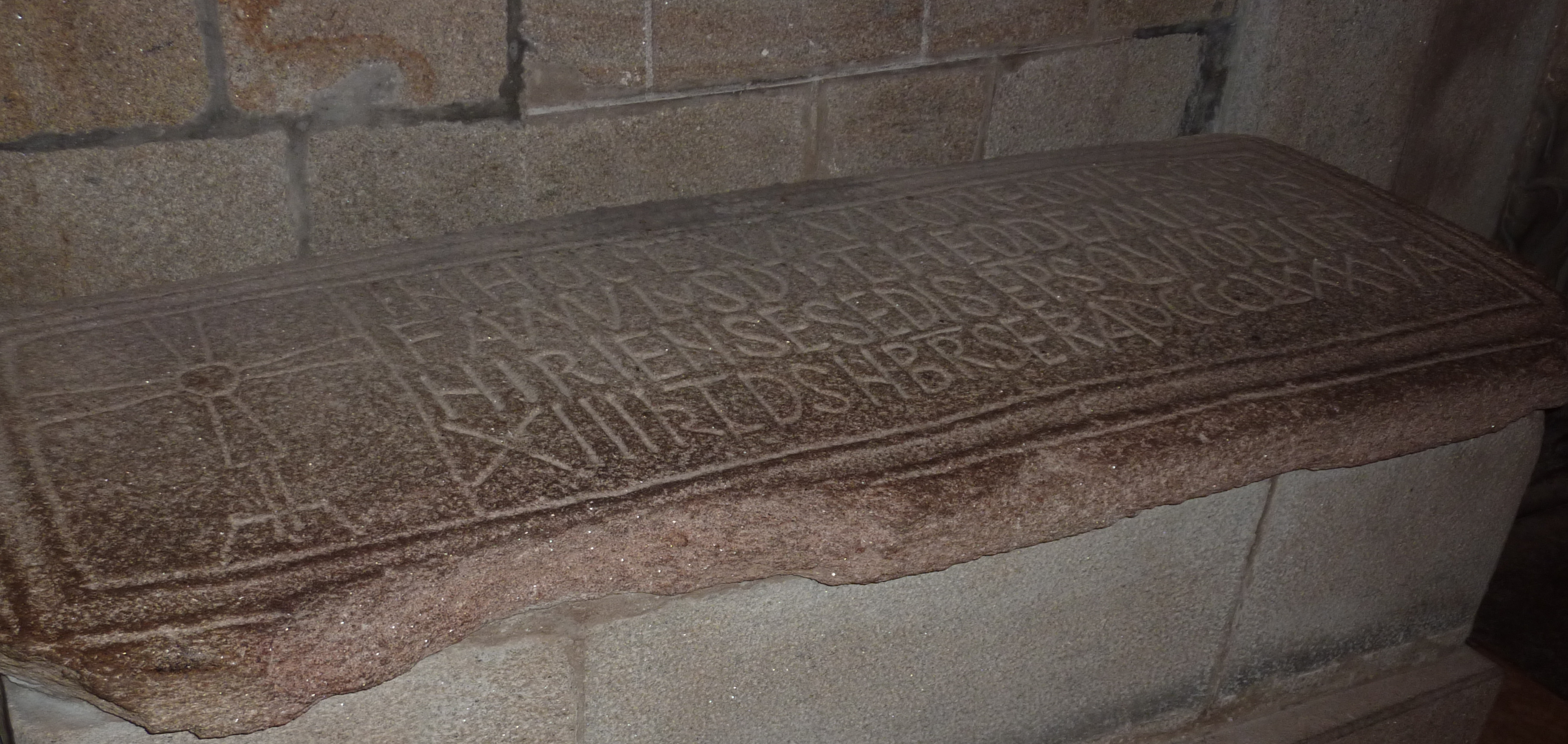
Tombstone of the sepulcher of bishop Theodemar of Iria (d. 847), discoverer of the tomb attributed to apostle Saint James the Great

"Alfonso king of Galicia and of Asturias, after having ravaged Lisbon, the last city of Spain, sent during the winter the insignias of his victory, breastplates, mules, and Moor prisoners, through his legates Froia and Basiliscus." Annales regni Francorum, c 798.

"And so, as I've been told, when Adefonsus departed of this world, as Nepotianus usurped the kingdom of Ramiro, Ramiro went to the city of Lugo in Galicia, and there he reunited the army of the whole province. After a while he burst into Asturias. He was met by Nepotianus, who has reunited a group of Asturians and Basques, at the bridge over the river Narcea. Nepotianus was immediately left stranded by his own people, being captured when fleeing by two counts, Sonna and Scipio." Chronicle of Alfonso III, ad Sebastianum, 21.

For several centuries after the defeat of the Goths, Galicia was united with other neighboring regions under the same monarchs, with only brief periods of separation under different kings. Along with the rest of the northwest of the Iberian Peninsula, it was free of Arab presence from the mid-8th century, being gradually incorporated into a growing Christian state. This is usually called the Kingdom of Asturias in traditional and modern sources, although the precise historical details of these events have been obscured by the national myths leading to the construction of modern Spanish identity.

The 9th century saw this state expand southward, with Castilian and Asturian noblemen acquiring most of the northern Meseta, while in Galicia, a similar impulse led to the conquest and re-population of the regions of Astorga, southern Galicia, and northern Portugal down to Coimbra, by noblemen mostly proceeding from northern Galicia. Also significant was the discovery of the tomb of Saint James the Great at what would become Santiago de Compostela; the shrine constructed there became the religious center of the nation, as well as being the destination of a major international pilgrimage route, the Way of St. James. This increased the political and military relevance of Galicia, and its noble families aspired to positions of power within the kingdom through either military force or by matrimonial alliance with the royal family. To the east, this southern expansion led the capital of the Christian kingdom to be moved to the city of León, from which time the state is usually called the Kingdom of León. This same kingdom was known as either Gallaecia or Galicia (Yillīqiya and Galīsiya) in Al-Andalus Muslim sources up to the 14th century, as well as by European Christian contemporaries.

=== Society ===
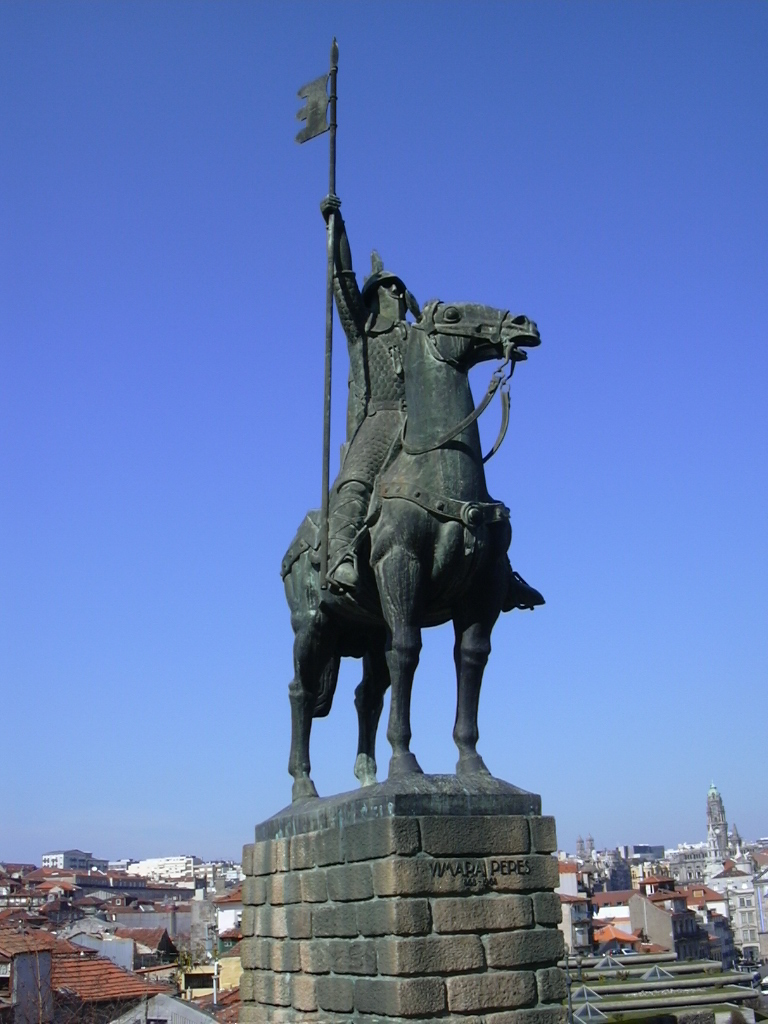
Statue of Vímara Peres, conqueror of Porto in 868

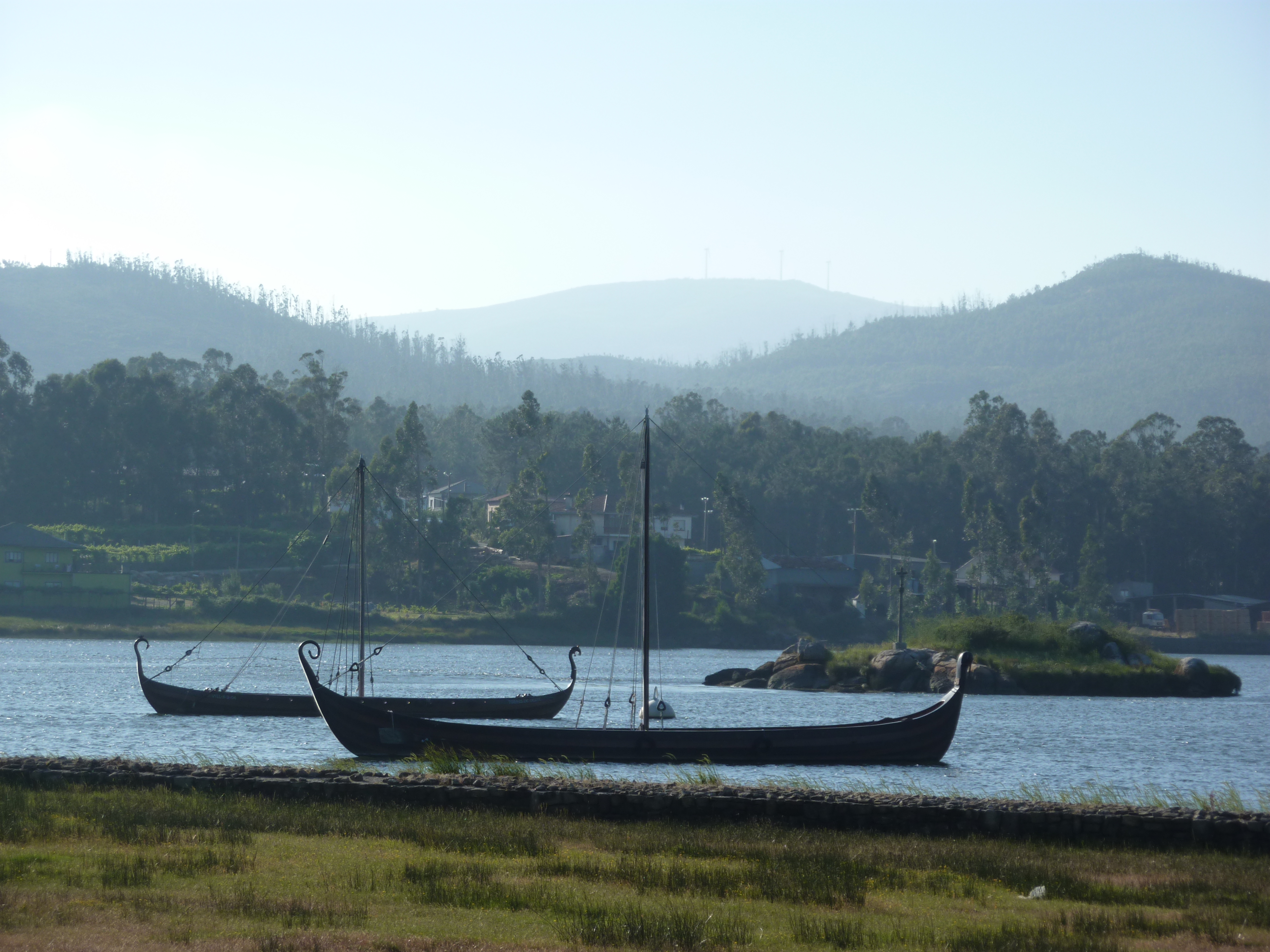
Modern replicas of Viking ships by the castle of Torres de Oeste, Catoira

During the Iron Age, and later during Roman and Germanic rule, Southern Gallaecia—today north Portugal and south Galicia—was the more dynamic, urbanized, and richest area of Gallaecia. This role was assumed by the rural north during the Early and High Middle Ages, as a consequence not only of the Islamic invasion, but as the final result of a continent-wide urban crisis.

The old bishoprics of Braga, Ourense, Tui, Lamego, and others, were either discontinued, or re-established in the north, under the protection of Lugo—which was now a stronghold due to its Roman walls—and Iria Flavia. Dumio was re-established by the Bay of Biscay in Mondoñedo, Lugo assumed the role of Braga, and the bishops of Lamego and Tui sought refuge in Iria, where they received generous territorial grants. During the 9th, 10th, and 11th centuries most of these bishoprics were re-established in their historical sees, but at this time the bishops of Lugo, Mondoñedo, and Iria became major political players—not just as religious figures, but also as wealthy, and sometimes mighty, secular powers. In particular, the bishops of Iria and Compostela were notorious warlords, due to the multiple fortresses and military resources they controlled as heads of a military Norman mark, as well as due to the wealth that the pilgrimages and royal grants brought to their lands.

Each bishopric was divided into a number of territories or counties, named terras, condados, mandationes, commissos, or territorios in local charters, which in the north were true continuations of the Suebic dioceses which frequently preserved old tribal divisions and denominations, such as Lemabos, Celticos, Postamarcos, Bregantinos, and Cavarcos. Rights to the tax collection and government of each territory was granted by the titular ruler—usually the king—to a count, bishopric, or large monastery, although there existed some singularities. The bishopric of Lugo was divided into counties, each one under the government of an infanzon (a lesser nobleman) as a concession of the bishop, while in the south, large and mighty territories such as the Portucalense became hereditary, passed down to the descendants of the 9th century's conquerors. In the Terra de Santiago (Land of Saint James, the fief of the bishops of Iria-Compostela) each territory was administered by a bishop's vicar, while justice was administered by a council composed of representatives of the local churchmen, knights, and peasants.

Each territory or county could be further divided into mandationes and decanias. The basic territorial division was the villa, centered on a church, and composed of one or more hamlets or villages, together with all its facilities, lands, and possessions. The villas perpetuated ancient Roman and Suevic foundations, and they were the base for the ecclesiastical organization, and for the economic production of the country, later evolving into the modern parroquias and freguesias (rural parishes). The local economy was subsistence, based mainly on the production of grain and beans, and notably in cattle breeding. Other valuable—though geographically restricted—products included fruits, salt, wine, honey, olive oil, horses, iron for the production of weapons and tools, and exotic oriental fabrics introduced from Spania. There were also specialized artisans who worked on demand, such as masons and goldsmiths.

While local commerce was common, long range interchanges—generally maintained by Hebrew merchants—were rare and appreciated. Monetary circulation was scarce, composed mainly of old Suebi and Visigothic coinage known locally as solidos gallicianos. War and pillaging against the thriving Al-Andalus was also an important source for the acquisition of riches, exotic items, and Muslim serfs. Later, pilgrimage of Christians from all over Europe to Santiago de Compostela brought not only riches, but also a range of continental innovations and trends, from shipbuilding, to new architectural styles such as Romanesque art.

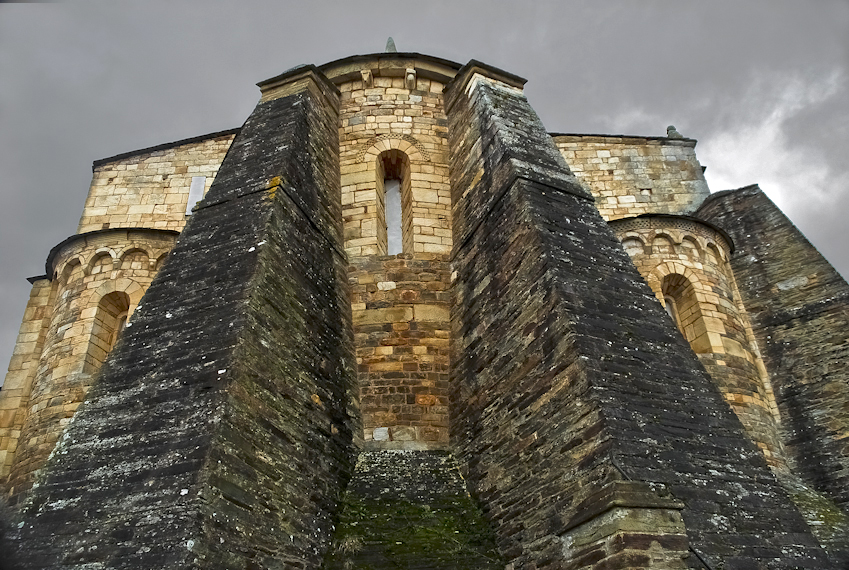
Romanesque cathedral of San Martiño de Mondoñedo (9th–11th centuries); first construction dates from the 6th–7th centuries

The elites were composed of counts, dukes, senatores, and other high noblemen, who were frequently related by marriage with the monarch, and who usually claimed the most powerful positions in society, either as governors, bishops, or as palatine officials or companions of the king or queen. The Galician nobility, however, were also frequently found as rebels, either as supporters of a different candidate to the throne, or aspiring to it themselves, or simply as disobedient to the king's orders and will. At the service of the noblemen were miles (knights) and infanzones; they were often found marching to war with their subalterns on behalf of a patron, or as vicars and administrators.

A sizable section of the society were churchmen—presbyters, deacons, clergymen, lectors, confessos, monks, and nuns—who frequently lived in religious communities, some of which were composed of both men and women living under vows of chastity and poverty. Most of these monasteries were directed by an abbot or abbess, ruled under a pactual tradition heavily influenced by Germanic legal traditions, with a bishop sub regula as the highest authority of the community. Other monasteries used different, sometimes antagonistic rules. The Benedictine and Augustine rules were uncommon until the 11th century. As in most of Europe, the chartulary and chronicle proceedings of monasteries and bishoprics are the most important sources for the study of local history.

By the 12th century the only known bourgeois were the multinational inhabitants of Compostela, by this stage a fortified and strong city. Meanwhile, the City Council of Santiago for centuries had struggled against their bishops for the recognition of a number of liberties. In the country, most people were freemen, peasants, artisans, or infantrymen, who could freely choose a patron, or buy and sell properties, although they frequently fell prey to the greed of the big owners, leading a number of them to a life of servitude. Finally, servos, libertos, and pueros (servants, freedmen, and children), either obtained in war with the Moors or through trial, constituted a visible part of the society; they were employed as household workers (domésticos and scancianes), shepherds, and farmhands. Local charters also show that, in time, they were freed.

In terms of religion, most were Roman Catholics, although the local rites—known today as Mozarabic rites—were notably different from those used in most of Western Europe. No Arian, Priscillianist, or Pagan organizations are known to have survived during the High Middle Ages. However, there were still pagans and pagan shrines in the Bierzo region during the 7th century, whilst Arian or Priscillianist tonsure—seen as long hair, with only a partial tonsure atop the head—was in use in Galicia up to 681, when it was forbidden at a council in Toledo. There were no known Muslim communities in Galicia and northern Portugal, other than Moor serfs. Records of Hebrew people are also uncommon in local charters until the 12th century, except as travelers and merchants.

Personal names in Galicia and northern Portugal were chiefly of Germanic origin, although Christian, Roman, and Greek names were also common. Names were usually composed just of a single surname, although noblemen frequently also used a patronymic. Muslim names and patronymics were rare amongst Galicians, as even serfs were frequently given a Germanic or Roman name, which is in contrast with the relative popularity of Muslim names amongst the Leonese.

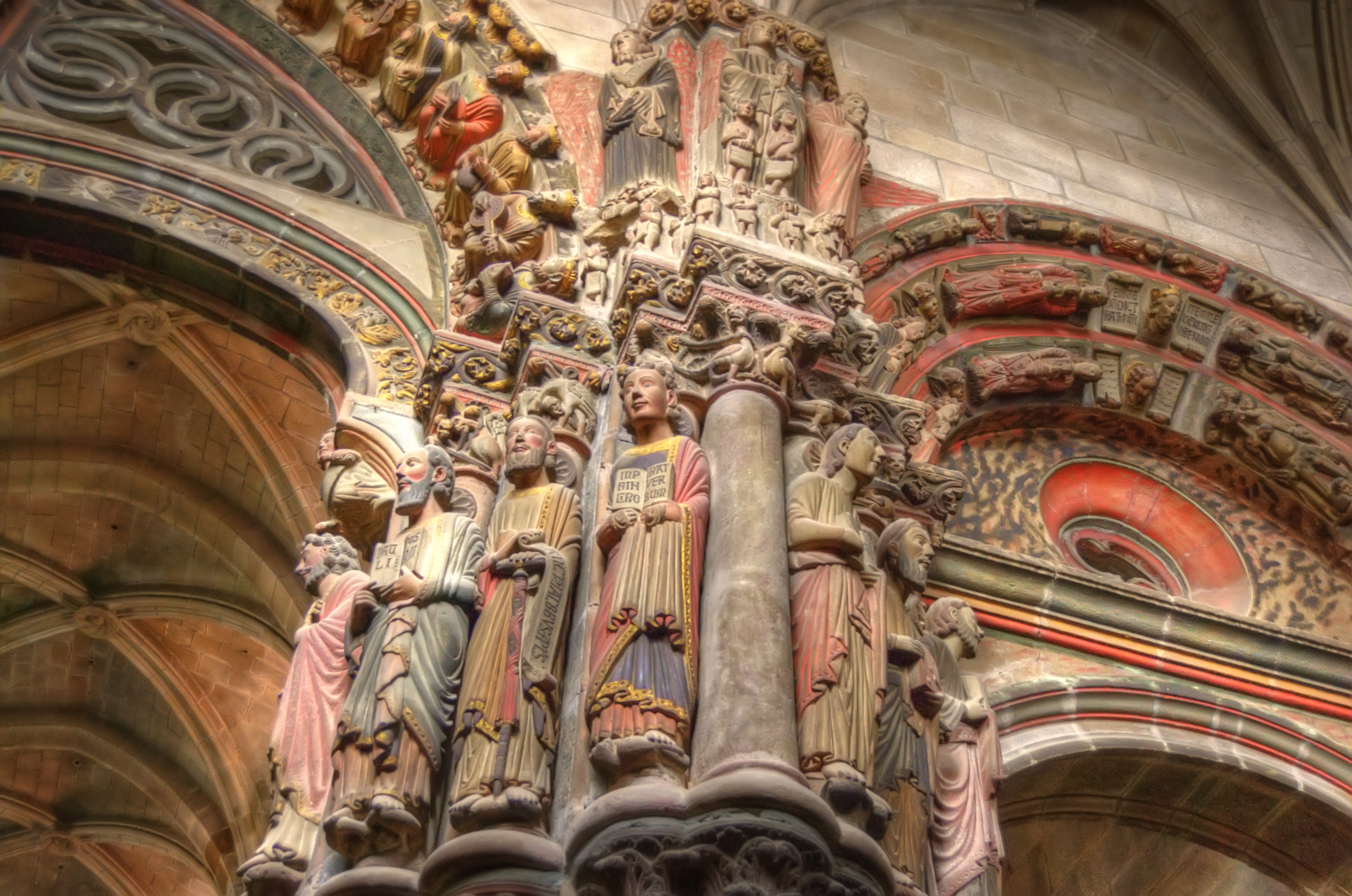
Romanesque façade in the Cathedral of Ourense (1160); founded in the 6th century, its construction is attributed to King Chararic

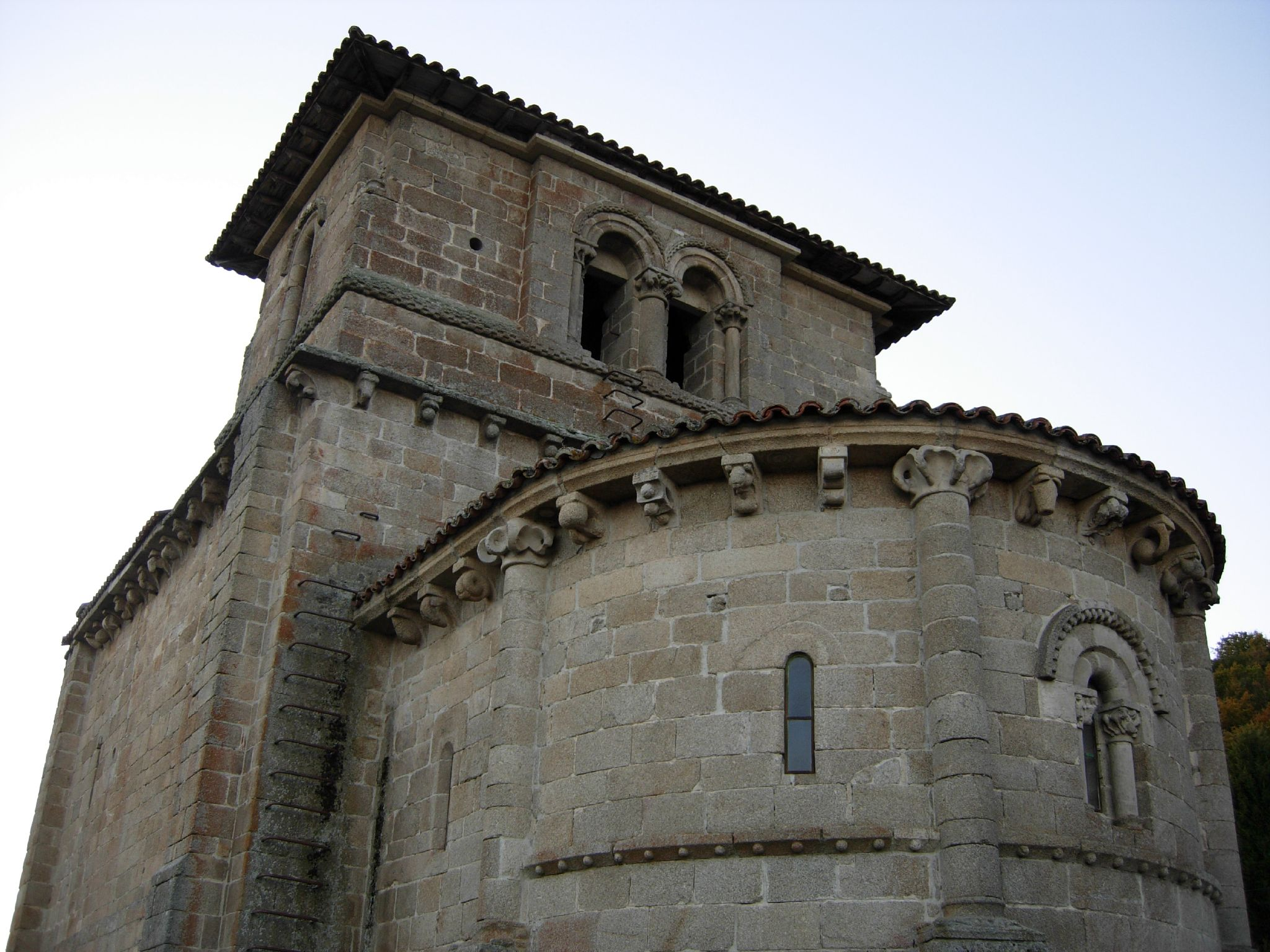
Monastical church of San Miguel de Eiré, Pantón (12th century)

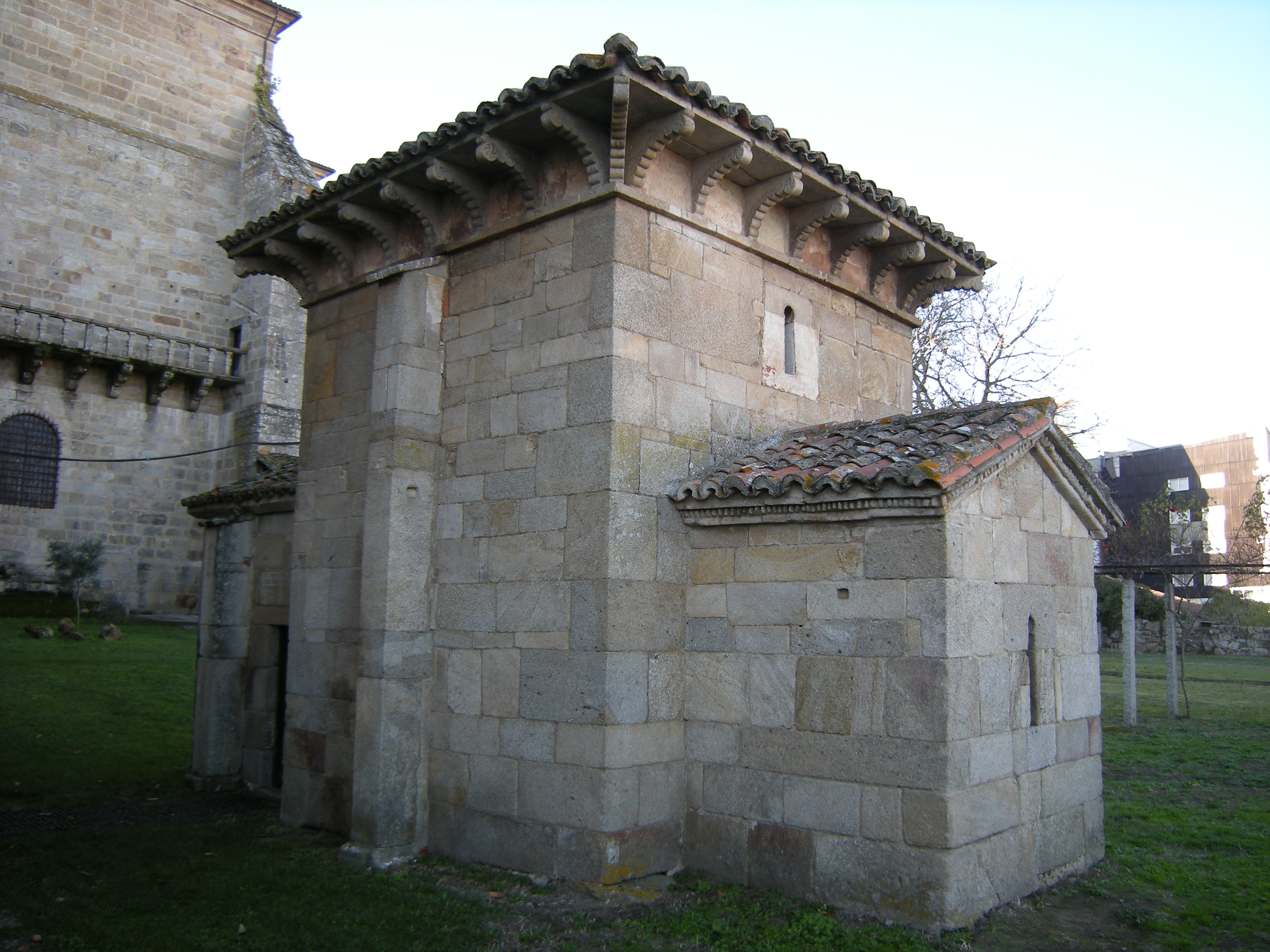
Oratory of San Miguel de Celanova (first quarter of the 10th century)

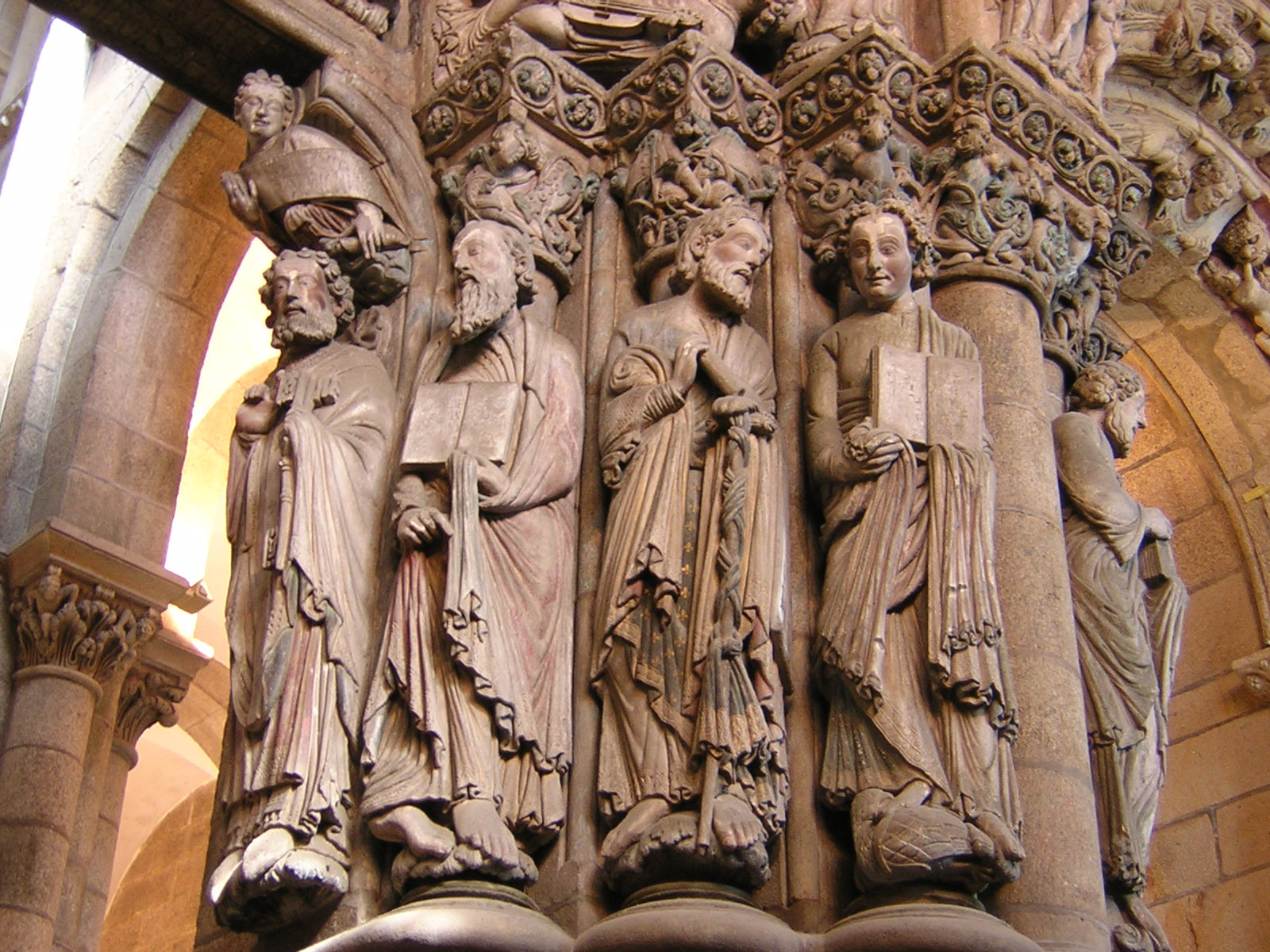
Pórtico da Gloria, Cathedral of Santiago de Compostela (12th–13th centuries), summum of the local Romanesque sculpture

=== Interludes of independence: 10th and 11th centuries ===
"When Fruela, king of Galicia, died (...) the Christians made king his brother Alfonso, who then found the throne disputed by his elder brother Sancho, who entered León, capital of the Kingdom of the Galicians, as an opponent (...) Until they decided to depose Sancho and to throw him from Leon, joining under the king Alfonso. Sancho then fled to the extreme of Galicia, where he was received and enthroned by the locals." Ibn Hayyan, Muqtabis, V, c. 1050.

"I Answar, to you, our lord and most serene king Don Sancho, prince of all Galicia, and to our lady, your wife, queen Goto." Document from the chartulary of Celanova, year 929.

"There king Don Sancho said (...) 'Don Alfonso, our father because of our sins left the land poorly divided, and he gave to Don Garcia most of the realm, and thou were left the most disinherited and with less lands; and that's why I propose to take from king Don Garcia the land our father gave to him.'" Primera Crónica General de España, 817.

When Alfonso III of León was forced by his sons to abdicate in 910, his lands were partitioned, bringing about the first episode of a short-lived distinct kingdom of Galicia. García I obtained the Terra de Fora or León, consisting of the southeastern portion of their father's realm, while Ordoño II held the western lands, i.e., Galicia (including the recently acquired lands of Coimbra) where he had already been serving as governor, and was now recognized as king in an assembly of magnates held in Lugo. The youngest brother, Fruela II, received the Asturian heartland in the northeast, with Oviedo as its capital.

From Galicia, Ordoño launched several successful raids on the Islamic south, returning with riches and Muslim serfs, and confirming himself as an able commander. At the death of García in 914, Ordoño also acquired León, and on his death in 924 his younger brother, Fruela, reunited Alfonso's realm. Fruela's death a year later initiated a period of chaos, with several claimants to the crown. Fruela's son, Alfonso Fróilaz, received support from Asturias, but was captured and blinded by Sancho, Alfonso IV, and Ramiro II, sons of Ordoño, with the aid of the Basque troops of Jimeno Garcés of Pamplona. Vague and conflicting historical records make it uncertain whether Alfonso Fróilaz reigned briefly as king of the entire kingdom, or simply held a remote part of Asturias. In Galicia, Sancho succeeded, being crowned in Santiago de Compostela and marrying a Galician noblewoman. After reigning for just three years he died childless. Alfonso IV then took control of an again-reunited Kingdom of León in 929; however, he was forced into a monastery by their youngest brother, Ramiro, two years later.

Ramiro II had ties with the Galician nobility through kinship, marriage and patronage, and he and his son, Ordoño III, whose mother was Galician, reigned with their support. This was not the case when Ordoño was succeeded by his half-brother Sancho I of León in 956. Sancho proved unpopular and ineffectual and the Galician nobles grew fractious, forming a coalition with Fernán González of Castile to overthrow Sancho in favor of Ordoño IV, who was enthroned in Santiago de Compostela in 958. However, Sancho reclaimed the crown in 960 with support from his mother's Kingdom of Pamplona, the Leonese nobility, and Muslim assistance. His son, Ramiro III, grew increasingly absolutist, alienating the Galician nobility who also resented the lack of Leonese help when the Normans raided Galicia from 968 through 970.

The Galician nobility again rose in rebellion, in 982 crowning and anointing Bermudo, son of Ordoño III, as king in Santiago de Compostela. With their support, he first repelled the army of Ramiro in the battle of Portela de Areas and eventually made himself undisputed ruler of the Leonese kingdom. Once in control, Bermudo lost a number of his Galician and Portuguese supporters by repudiating his Galician wife in favor of a new marriage alliance with Castile. His later reign was marked by the ascension of a strong military leader, Almanzor, who led a brief resurgence of the Cordoban Caliphate, reconquering Coimbra or Viseu, and even raiding Santiago de Compostela.

In the 1030s, Galicia became the sole holdout to the Leonese conquests of Sancho III of Pamplona. When the Count of Castile—nominally a Leonese vassal, but de facto independent—was assassinated in León in 1029, Sancho claimed the right to name the successor, giving it to his own son Ferdinand. Taking advantage of the youth of Leonese king Bermudo III, Sancho seized disputed border regions, formalizing the arrangement by including the lands in the dowry of Bermudo's sister, who was married to Ferdinand in 1032. Two years later, in 1034, Sancho took Bermudo's capital, becoming de facto ruler of most of the kingdom, whilst leaving Bermudo to rule from his refuge in Galicia. Sancho's death the next year allowed Bermudo to regain not only the entire kingdom, but to briefly become overlord of Ferdinand's Castile. However, in 1037, the Castilian count killed Bermudo in battle, and Galicia passed with the Kingdom of León into the hands of Ferdinand, who then had himself crowned king.

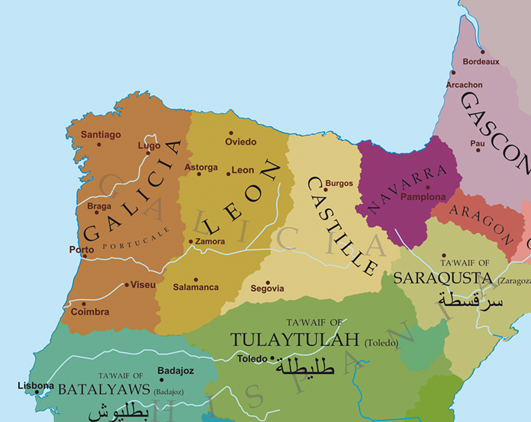
Political situation in the Northern Iberian Peninsula around 1065: Garcia II's domains (Galicia) Badajoz, owing tribute to Garcia Seville, owing tribute to Garcia Alfonso VI's domains (León) Toledo, owing tribute to Alfonso Sancho II's domains (Castile) Zaragoza, owing tribute to Sancho

Ferdinand's death in 1065 led to another short-lived Galician state. In 1063 he had opted to partition his realm, giving the eastern Kingdom of Castile to his eldest son, Sancho II, along with the right to the paria (tribute) from the Taifa of Zaragoza. His second son Alfonso VI was given the Kingdom of León, representing the central portion of the old realm, with the paria from Toledo. His youngest son, García II, who had been educated in Galicia under the tutelage of bishop Cresconius of Compostela, received the western half of Bermudo's old kingdom as King of Galicia, along with the right to parias from the Taifas of Badajoz and Seville.

As king, Garcia aimed to restore the old episcopal sees of Tui, Lamego, and Braga, which had been dissolved due to Arab and Viking assaults. The death of two of his most notable supporters, bishops Cresconius of Compostela and Uistrarius of Lugo, left the young king in a weaker position, and in 1071 the Count of Portugal, Nuno Mendes, rose in rebellion. García defeated and killed him in the same year at the Battle of Pedroso, and in recognition of his solidified control adopted the title King of Galicia and Portugal. However, his brothers, Alfonso and Sancho, immediately turned on the victor, forcing García to flee, first to central Portugal and later—after defeating him near Santarém—into exile in Seville in 1072. García's realm was divided, with Alfonso joining the county of Portugal to his Kingdom of León, while Sancho held the north.

This situation was inherently unstable, with Sancho's lands separated by Alfonso's León, and the two soon fought a war in which Sancho proved victorious, forcing Alfonso into exile and reuniting all of Ferdinand's kingdom except the autonomous city of Zamora, held by his sister Urraca. While besieging this town in 1072, Sancho was assassinated, inducing Alfonso to return and claim the entire realm. García also returned in 1073 from his exile, either with the hope of re-establishing himself in Galicia, or simply having been misled by promises of safety from Alfonso, however, he was imprisoned by Alfonso for the rest of his life, dying in 1091. As an aftermath to these events, before 1088 Alfonso deposed the bishop of Compostela, Diego Peláez, who was charged "on trying to deliver the Kingdom of Galicia ["Galleciae Regnum"] to the king of the English and of the Normans [William the Conqueror], while taking it away from the kings of the Spaniards". This reunion with the Kingdom of León would prove permanent, although both kingdoms maintained their separate personality.

=== Raymond of Burgundy ===
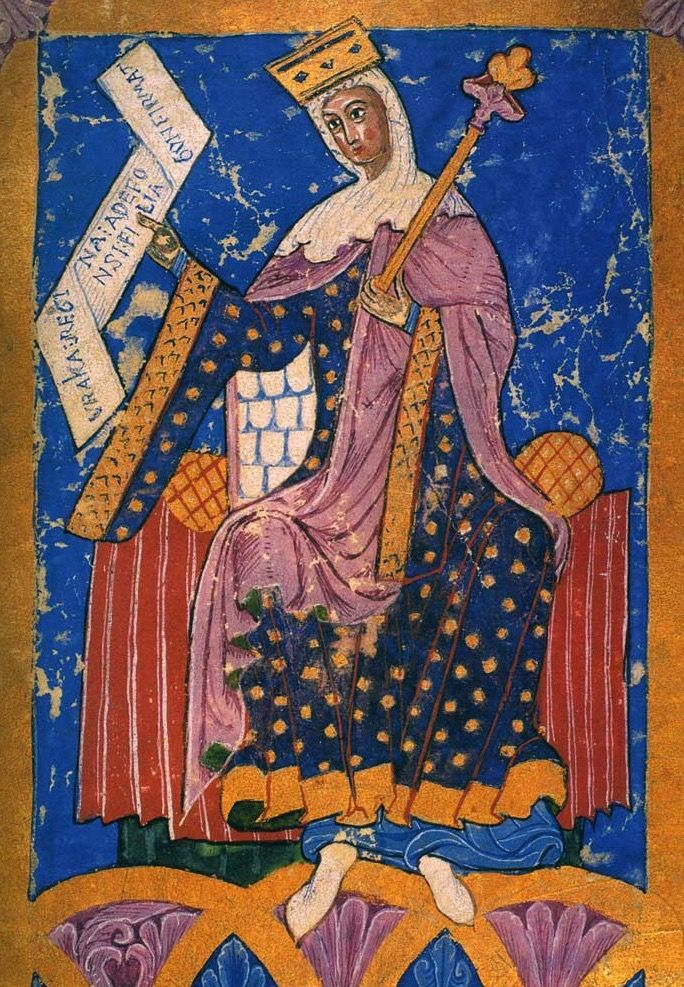
Queen Urraca ruled Galicia with her husband, Raymond of Burgundy, until the death of her father Alfonso VI. Medieval portrait, Tumbo A chartulary of the Cathedral of Santiago de Compostela

In 1091 the daughter of King Alfonso VI, infanta Urraca, married a Burgundian nobleman, Raymond of Burgundy, who had participated in the Crusades against the Almoravids. His military victories as well as his Anscarid lineage justified this union, and Alfonso bestowed on him the government of Galicia between Cape Ortegal and Coimbra, as a personal fief. This union gave rise to the House of Burgundy, which would rule in Galicia, León, and Castile until the death of King Peter.

Two years after Raymond's marriage, in 1093, another French crusader, his cousin Henry, the grandson of Duke Robert I of Burgundy and nephew of Alfonso's queen, was given the hand of the Alfonso's illegitimate daughter Theresa, receiving lands in Castille. Both Burgundians were close allies in the affairs of the realm, ratifying a pact of friendship where Raymond promised his cousin the Kingdom of Toledo or the Kingdom of Galicia, together with a third of his treasure, in return for Henry's aid in acquiring the crown as successor of King Alfonso. However, by 1097 King Alfonso granted Henry the counties of Portugal and Coimbra, from the river Minho to the Tagus, thus limiting the powers of Raymond, who by this time was securing an important nucleus of partisans in Galicia, including Count Pedro Fróilaz de Traba, whilst appointing his own notary, Diego Gelmírez, as bishop of Compostela. In successive years he also obtained the government of Zamora, Salamanca, and Ávila, but he died in 1107, two years before King Alfonso, who was now in his seventies. The government of Galicia and their other possessions was retained by Alfonso's widow, Urraca, who styled herself Mistress and Empress of Galicia. King Alfonso, in a council held in León, asked the magnates of Galicia to swear an oath on the defense of the rights of his grandson, Alfonso Raimúndez, to the kingdom of Galicia, in case his mother Urraca remarried.

On June 30, 1109, King Alfonso VI died. He was succeeded by Queen Urraca, who was remarried in 1109 to the king of Aragon, Alfonso the Battler, a soldier by nature who was immediately received as king in Castille and León, but not in Galicia. As part of the marriage settlement, any children born to the union were to have priority over Raymond's son Alfonso in the succession. In Galicia this union was rejected by the old party of count Raymond, now led by count Pedro Fróilaz, tutor of young Alfonso, although the partisans of Urraca also joined forces. With Leon and Castille quiet and under control, Alfonso moved on Galicia in 1110, and while he did not suffer any major defeat, he had little success, returning three months later to León. Probably as a consequence of this development, Pedro Froila drew Diego Gelmirez to his party. In 1111, the young Alfonso Raimúndez was crowned and anointed king in Compostela.

=== Separation of the County of Portugal (1128) ===
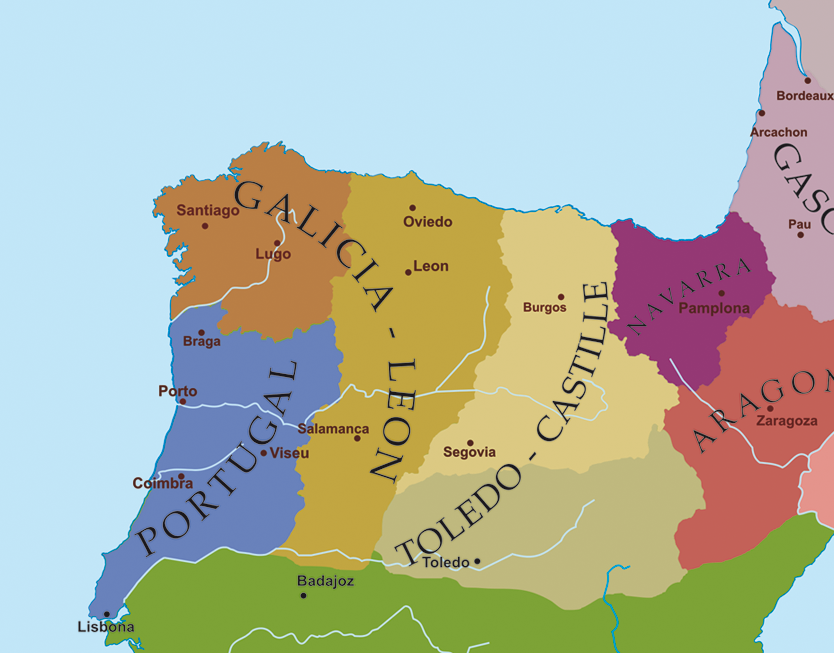
Political Map of the northwest Iberian peninsula at the end of the 12th century

On the death of Henry in 1112, his widow Theresa succeeded him as head of the two Counties of Portugal and Coimbra, during the minority of her son, Afonso Henriques. Two trends emerged at this time, firstly a policy of rapprochement with the new King Alfonso VII, and secondly the maintenance of their power with the aim that the heir to the county would be proclaimed king. The increasing importance of Santiago de Compostela—now metropolitan church of Lusitania, which was in open competition with Braga, metropolitan church of Galicia—and the support for Theresa's rule north of the Minho brought about by her romantic union with Fernando Pérez de Traba altered the status quo. The Archbishop of Braga, who had suffered the nocturnal theft of several relics, including the body of Saint Fructuosus of Braga, by Diego Gelmirez in 1102, and the major Portuguese aristocrats who were pursuing a larger territorial authority, gave support to the royal pretensions of Afonso Henriques. Given this situation, King Alfonso VII marched on Portugal, taking first Tui and other territories north of the river Minho, later besieging Guimarães and obtaining the submission of the Portuguese.

Several months later, in 1128, inspired by the shortcomings of Afonso Henriques, the Galician and Portuguese troops of Theresa and Fernando Perez de Trava entered Portugal, but the men of Afonso scored a decisive victory at the Battle of São Mamede. The later death of Theresa, and Afonso's success against the Moors at the Battle of Ourique, led to him being proclaimed King of the Portuguese in 1139, this independence being recognized at the Treaty of Zamora in 1143. Still, the status of frontier lands such as Toroño and Limia in southern Galicia led to frequent border conflicts during most of the Lower Middle Ages.

=== Compostelan era (1111–1230) ===
Excerpts from the Historia Compostelana
The laws, the rights, the peace, the justice, called the Galician to arms; everything which is wrong threw the Aragonese into every kind of crime. HC, I.87
Oh shame! The Castilians need foreign forces and are protected by the audacity of the Galicians. What will become of these coward knights when the army of Galicia, their shield and protection, is gone?. HC, I.90
Shipbuilders came from Genoa to Compostela, they presented themselves to the bishop and they reached an agreement for building two ships at a fixed price. It can be guessed the utility of the matter and the joy of the seashore dwellers, and even of all the Galicians, because of the freedom and the protection of the fatherland. HC, I.103.
The queen hurried coming to Galicia to reconcile with the bishop; because she knew that through him she could keep or lose the kingdom of Galicia, because the bishop and the church of Compostela is capital and looking glass of Galicia. HC, I.107.
«The king Don Alfonso, my grandparent, put the condition that in case the queen, my mother, was to stay as a widow, all the kingdom of Galicia would stay under her domain; but if she ever married, the kingdom of Galicia would return to me.» HC I.108

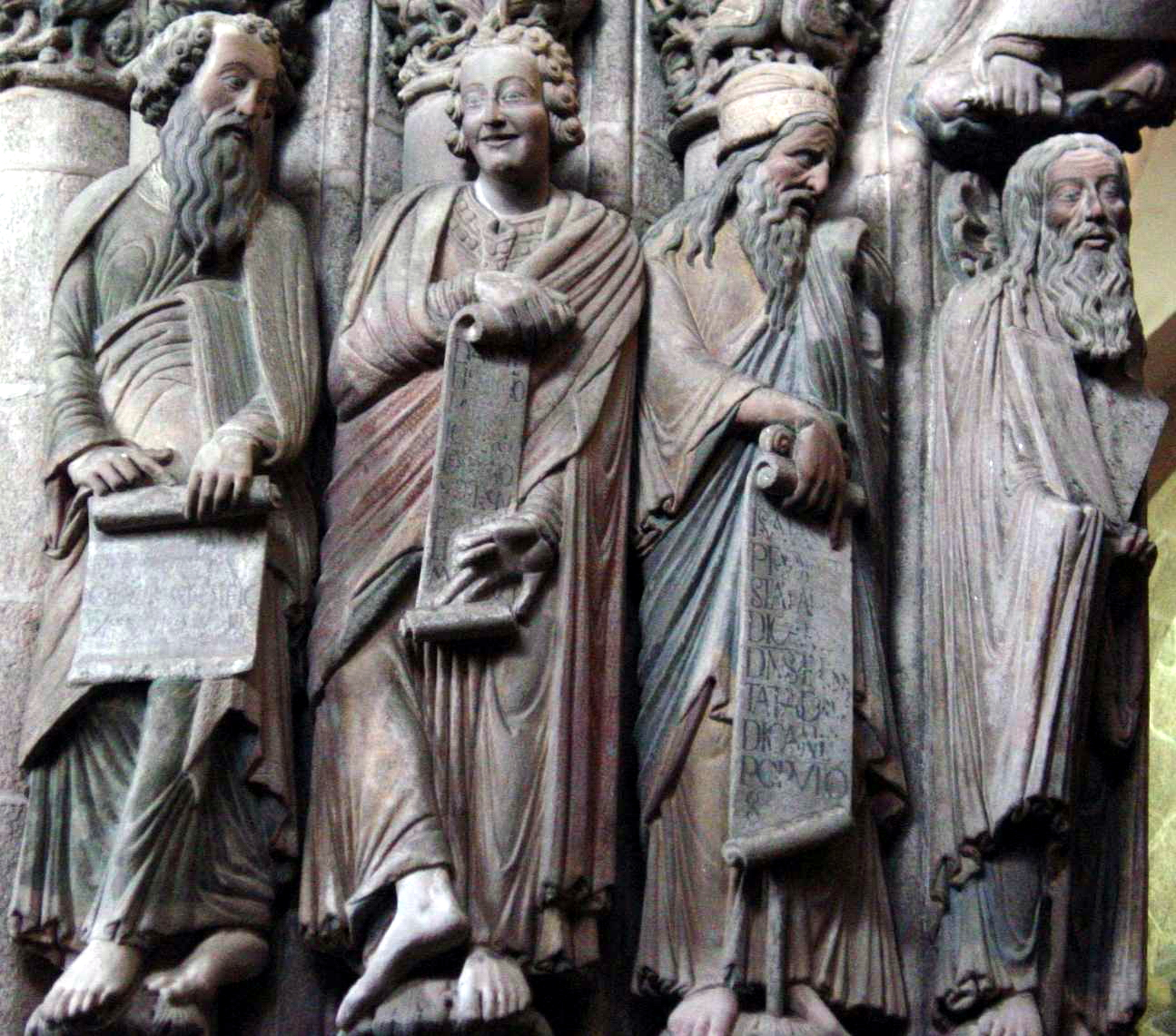
Pórtico da Gloria, Cathedral of Santiago de Compostela

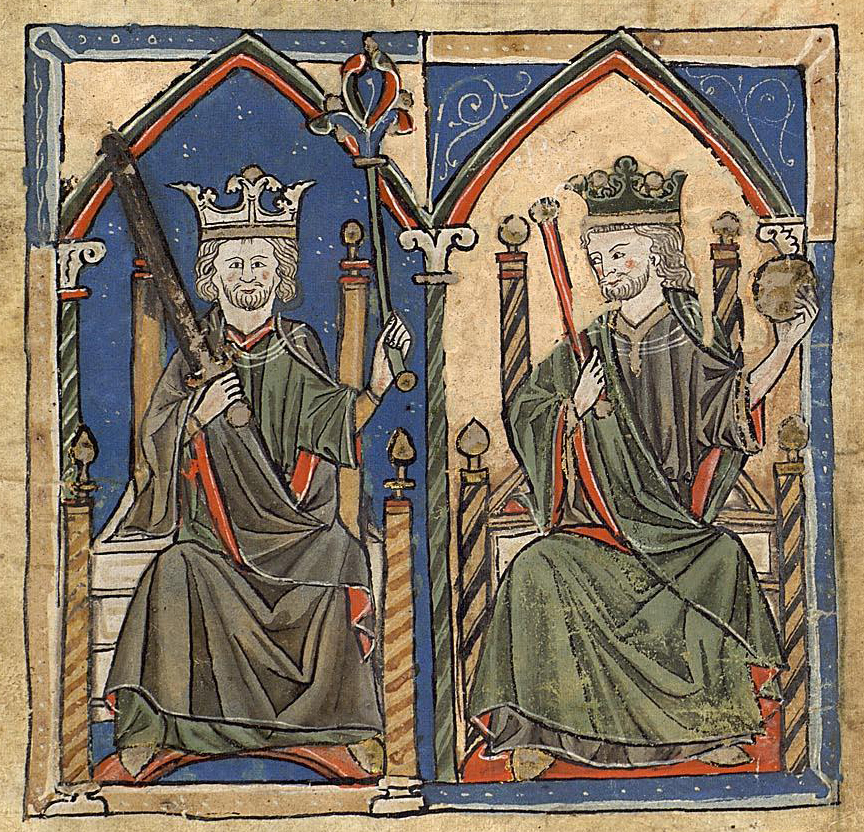
Medieval miniatures of Ferdinand II (left) and Alfonso IX (right), kings of León and Galicia. Chartulary of the monastery of Toxosoutos, Lousame, 13th century

At Santiago de Compostela on September 17, 1111 the Galician high nobility crowned Alfonso VII, the son of Raymond and Urraca, as king of Galicia, and he was anointed by bishop Diego Gelmírez; the coronation was led by Pedro Fróilaz de Traba, who had been Alfonso's mentor throughout his childhood. The coronation was intended to preserve the rights of the son of Raymond of Burgundy in Galicia, at a time when Urraca effectively delivered the kingdoms of Castile and León to her new husband, Alfonso the Battler of Aragon and Navarre.

The ceremony in Compostela was more symbolic than effective, and Diego Gelmírez, Pedro Fróilaz, and other Galician nobles headed first to Lugo, and later to the royal seat in León to enthrone Alfonso VII there. However, they were intercepted at Viadangos, near León, by the troops of Alfonso the Battler. The Galician knights charged, but they were outnumbered and surrounded by the Aragonese infantry, who defeated the Galicians and frustrated their plans. Pedro Fróilaz was taken prisoner, whilst other nobles were killed, but bishop Gelmírez managed to escape, delivering his protégé, the young king, to his mother, who began acting against her new husband. From then until Alfonso VII came of age and Urraca died, the entire realm lived under a constant state of civil war, experiencing frequent seizures and shifting alliances between mother and child, and between Urraca and her Aragonese husband. This same civil war was evident in the kingdom of Galicia, where partisans of Diego Gelmirez, of Pedro Fróilaz, and of other nobles and warlords, found themselves battling each other as defenders of either Queen Urraca or King Alfonso VII, or under their own agenda, whilst Alfonso of Aragón and Theresa of Portugal also had their own supporters. With Calixtus II, uncle of Alfonso VII, becoming Pope, Diego Gelmírez secured the elevation of Compostela into an archdiocese in 1120 through a steady flow of generous donations sent to Rome. Bishop Diego attempted to gain recognition for Compostela by becoming primate of Spain, but lost the title to Toledo, the old Visigoth capital. Later, however, he sought to have Compostela recognized as the metropolitan church of the Kingdom of Galicia, in opposition to the church of Braga, which had been the metropolitan since at least the days of Martin of Dumio. Calixtus II did not grant Gelmirez's claims, but finally decided to enlarge Compostela's jurisdiction in an anomalous fashion: instead of Galicia, Compostela was granted control over the old jurisdiction of Mérida, the former metropolitan church of Lusitania, which was then under Muslim control without a bishop. Consequently, the bishops of Coimbra, Lamego, Viseu, or Salamanca, among others, were subjected to the rule of Compostela. Braga, metropolitan of the cities of Galicia other than Compostela, found itself limited by the jurisdiction of the latter, and became the centre of the movement for the independence of Portugal. In 1128 the leader of the Galician nobility, Fernando Peres de Trava, together with his lover Countess Theresa of Portugal, who were acting with absolute liberty in most of Galicia and Portugal, were defeated by Afonso Henriques, Theresa's son. This was the foundation of the future kingdom of Portugal. On his death in 1156, Alfonso VII divided his domains under pressure from the Castilian and Galician nobles, bequeathing León and Galicia to his second son, Ferdinand II. Ferdinand, who had been using the title of King of Galicia at least since 1152, had been as a child ward of the influential Count Fernando Peres de Trava, heir and son of Count Pedro Fróilaz, who in turn had been tutor of Alfonso VII. In 1158 the death of his brother Sancho III of Castile permitted him to intervene the Castilian internal affairs, which led him to use the title Rex Hispaniarum. In his own realm, he continued his father's policies by granting Cartas Póvoa or Foros (constitutional charters) to towns such as Padrón, Ribadavia, Noia, Pontevedra and Ribadeo, most of them possessing important harbors or sited in rich valleys. Thus he promoted the growth of the bourgeoisie and improved the local economy through the expansion of commerce. He also contributed to the economic and artistic development of the Cathedral of Santiago de Compostela, at least after the death of bishop Martin in 1168, and under the rule of two of his closest subjects, bishops Pedro Gudestéiz and Pedro Suárez de Deza. Ferdinand died in 1188, in Benavente, leaving two main claimants to the throne: his sons Sancho, born of a Castilian noblewoman, and Alfonso, from Ferdinand's first marriage, to Urraca of Portugal. Alfonso, supported by the Galician nobility and by the archbishop of Compostela Pedro Suárez de Deza, hastened to Santiago de Compostela carrying the remains of his father and proclaiming himself King there. Unlike his father, he dropped the title of "King of the Spains", preferring the use of "King of León" and "King of León and Galicia". Alfonso IX's long reign was characterized by his rivalry with Castile and Portugal, and by the promotion of the royal power at the expense of the church and nobility, whilst maintaining his father's urban development policies. He was one of the first European monarchs to call for a general council, summoning not only the nobility and the Church, but also the inhabitants of the towns and cities, presaging modern representative parliaments. The last years of his reign were also marked by the conquest of large areas of what is now Extremadura (including the cities of Cáceres, Mérida and Badajoz) then in the hands of the Almohad Caliphate, a territory also wanted by the Portuguese.

Alfonso granted constitutional charters to the towns of Betanzos, A Coruña, Baiona, Salvaterra de Miño, Verín, Monforte de Lemos, O Valadouro, Milmanda, Bo Burgo de Castro Caldelas, Melide, Sarria and Triacastela, sited in good harbors along the Galician coastline, by the Miño river, or at major crossroads in the country. These new reguengo villages (royal villages under direct royal political and economical control, and administered by their autonomous city councils), each one usually known as a burgo due to its walled circuits, attracted peasants, who could find better living conditions under the direct protection of the king than abroad under the authority of a bishop, a monastery or a nobleman; they also attracted foreigners, most notably artisans and merchants, who brought new trends and knowledge. These burgs effected a revolution in the social structure of the time, leading to economic diversification, removing the dominant autarky of the previous centuries, and facilitating the development of fishing and pre-industrial mass production of some resources, especially salted and dried fish, fish oil, and wine, marketed through the seaports to England and the Mediterranean.

'I, Alfonso, by the grace of God King of León and of Galicia, by this writing, which is to be forever valid (...) I grant and confirm to the town council of Bayona, that is, Erizana, the rights and 'foros' or customs for they to live, and to have, and to direct their town in justice, and so the small people with the greater one, and the greater people with the small one, there forever they may live in peace and quietly...'
Foro or Constitutional Charter of Baiona, 1201.
'We must also consider that there are five kingdoms among the Spaniards, namely that of Aragon, that of the Navarrese, and that of those who specifically are named Spaniards, which capital is Toledo, as well as those of the inhabitants of Galicia and Portugal'
Narratio de Itinere Navali Peregrinorum Hierosolymam Tendentium et Silviam Capientium, AD. 1189.

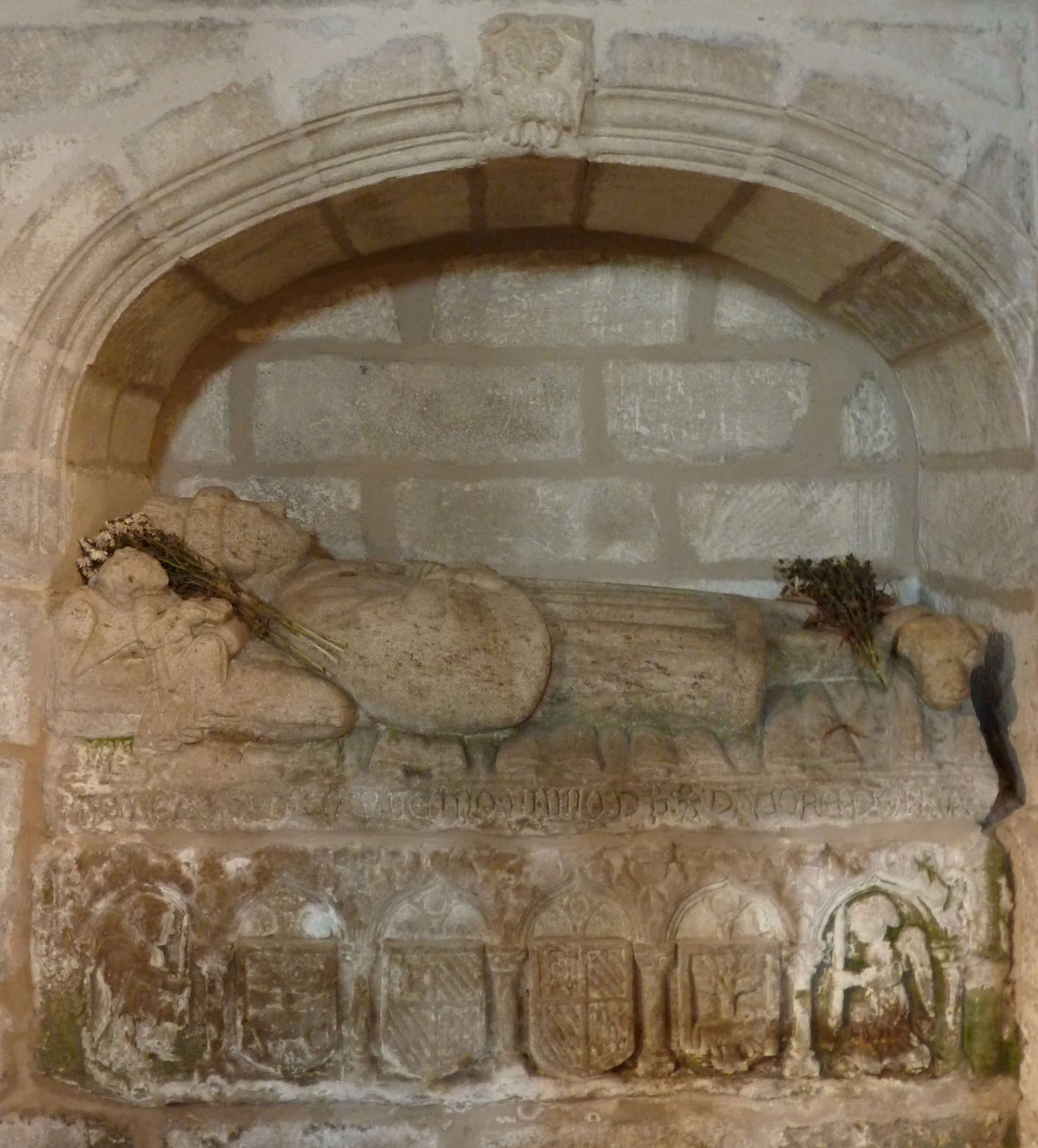
Sepulchre of a merchant: Pero Carneiro, son of Pero Afonso da Corredoira, in the church of St. Mary a Nova, Noia

In these cities and villages the emergence of an associative movement led to the creation of permanent city councils, and the organization of artisan guilds or confrarías, which would in time acquire a religious hue just to avoid being banned or punished in their patrimonies. These new burgs also allowed a number of minor noble houses to consolidate power by occupying the new administrative and political offices, in open competition with the new classes: mayors, aldermen (regedores, alcaldes, justiças), agents and other officials (procuradores, notarios, avogados) and judges (juizes) of the town council; or mordomos and vigarios (leader and deputies) of the diverse guilds.

Throughout this century there was also a rapid growth of the rural population, resulting in a larger force of farm labor which consequently allowed the great monasteries to develop new agricultural lands. This, coupled with the improvement of farming equipment and techniques, such as the introduction of the heavy wheeled plough, resulted in an increase in productivity that impacted the people's lifestyles. The distribution of this increased productivity between peasants and lords was regulated by the establishment of foros or lifelong contracts, frequently spanning several generations or vozes. The economic and social transformations led to profound changes in mindset. In the towns, it initiated a religious and intellectual renewal under the mendicant orders, most notably the Franciscans, who instituted social reforms.

Compostela, "capital and looking glass" of the Kingdom of Galicia, became a showcase of this thriving era, reflected in Master Matthew's work in the granite of the Cathedral of Santiago de Compostela—especially in the Portico da Gloria and in Prateria's façade—demonstrating a prosperity also witnessed through the surviving Romanesque buildings in Galicia. This period is also responsible for Latin literary creations such as the Codex Calixtinus and the Historia Compostellana. The Historia is an extensive chronicle of the deeds of the bishop of Compostela, Diego Gelmirez, and, though partisan, it is a source of great significance for the understanding of contemporary events and Galician society in the first half of the 12th century.

=== Union under the Crown of Castile (1230) ===
In the early Medieval era, a fluid pattern of union and division was observed among the states of Christian Iberia. While marriage of royals had resulted in the union of some of these states—for example between Navarre and Aragon, and Castile and León—subsequent divisions amongst heirs created a dynamic pattern of union and separation. However, the 12th century initiated a series of unions that would prove permanent.

Alfonso IX married twice. From his first marriage to Teresa of Portugal he had a son, Ferdinand, and two daughters, Sancha and Aldonza. From his second marriage to Berengaria of Castile, he had five children: Eleanor, who died as a child, a second Ferdinand, Alfonso, Berengaria, and Constance. The death of Alfonso IX's son from his first marriage, Ferdinand, in 1214 left the younger Ferdinand, from his second marriage, as heir to his father. When the Castilian king, Henry I, died in 1217 and Berengaria ceded her rights to her son, Ferdinand became King of Castile, against the will of his father.

To preserve the independence of his realm, Alfonso IX applied Galician-Leonese inheritance customs to nominate Aldonza as future queen of Galicia and Sancha as queen of León, enlisting their uncle Afonso II of Portugal to support their succession. Alfonso died in 1230 in Sarria, while on pilgrimage to Santiago de Compostela to thank the apostle for his help in the conquest of Extremadura, and his body was taken there for burial. Most of the Leonese nobility cleaved to Ferdinand, who also gained the support of the new Portuguese king, Sancho II. After clashes in León and Galicia, Alfonso IX's two former wives, Berengaria and Theresa, reached an agreement whereby Theresa induced Aldonza and Sancha to abandon their regal claims in exchange for an annuity. As a result, Ferdinand III became successor to Alfonso's kingdoms of León and Galicia, bringing about a permanent union into what would come to be called the Crown of Castile, wherein the kingdoms continued as administrative entities under the unified rule of a single monarch.

Royal pantheon of the Cathedral of Santiago de Compostela

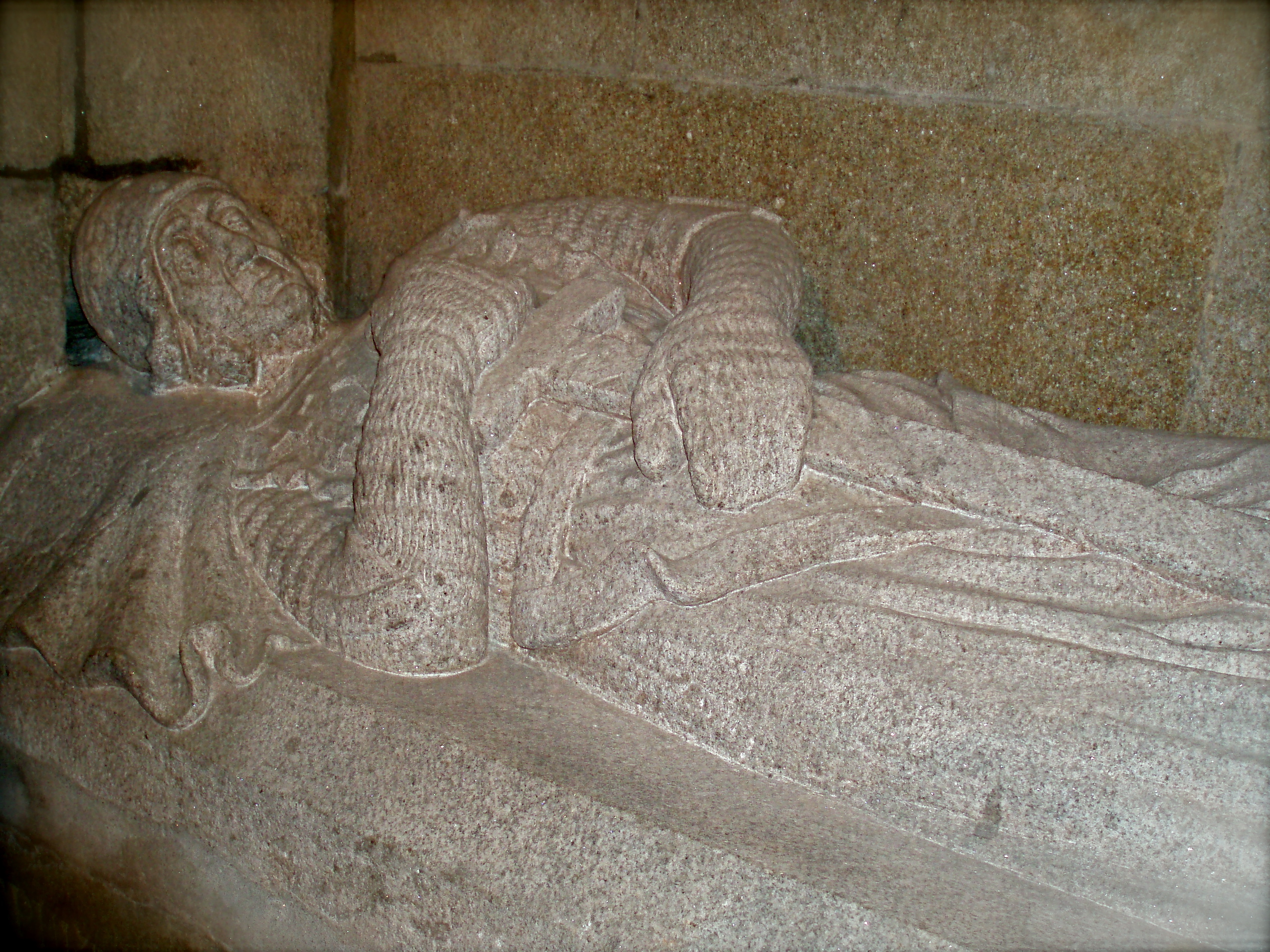
Sepulcher of count Pedro Fróilaz de Traba (Orbem Galletie Imperante), protector of king Alfonso VII (d. 1128)

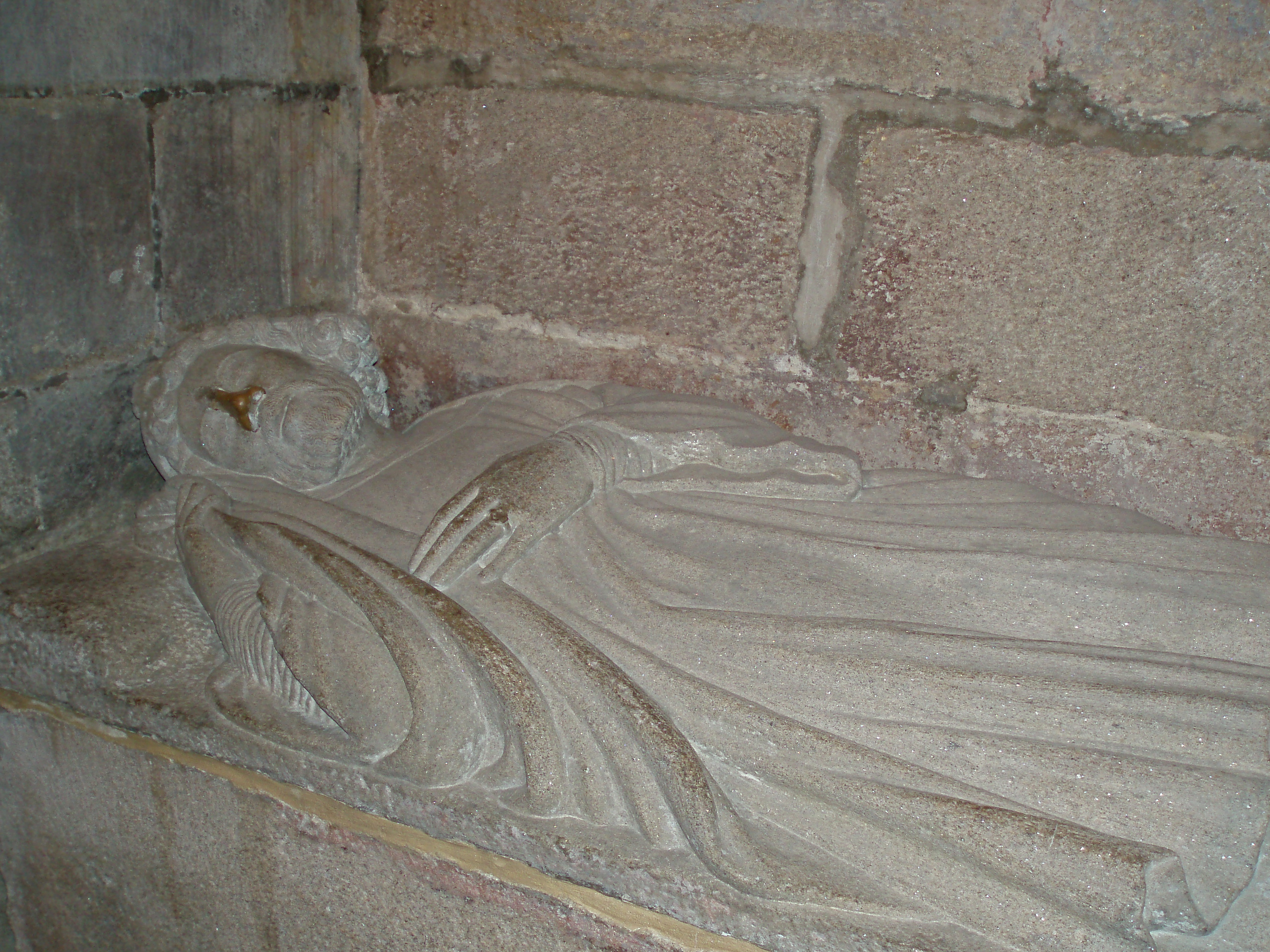
Sepulcher of king Ferdinand II (Rex in Legione et Gallecia) (d. 1187)

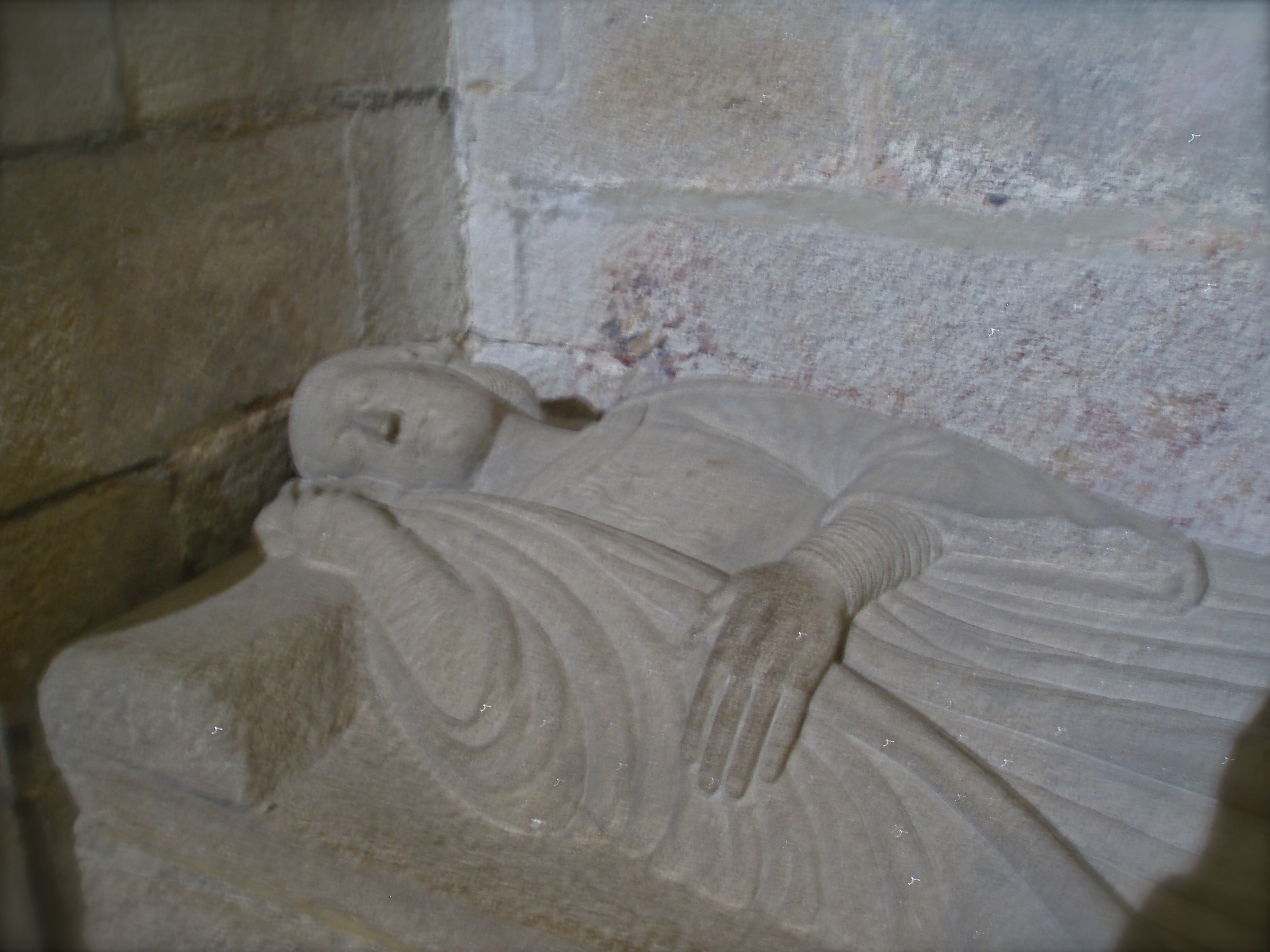
Sepulcher of Ferdinand of Galicia and León. Son and heir of the king Afonso VIII (known as alfonso ix in the Spanish bibliography) (d. 1214)

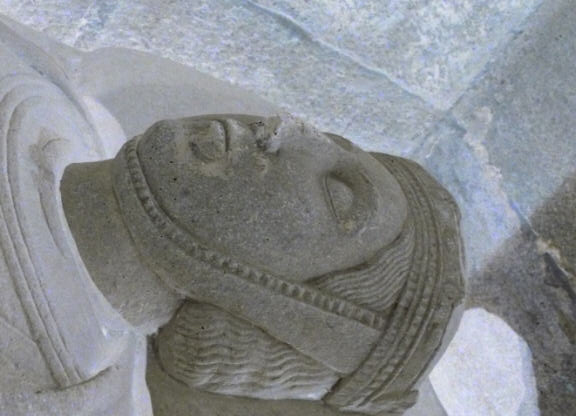
Sepulcher of the queen Berengaria of Barcelona wife of Afonso VII (d. 1149)

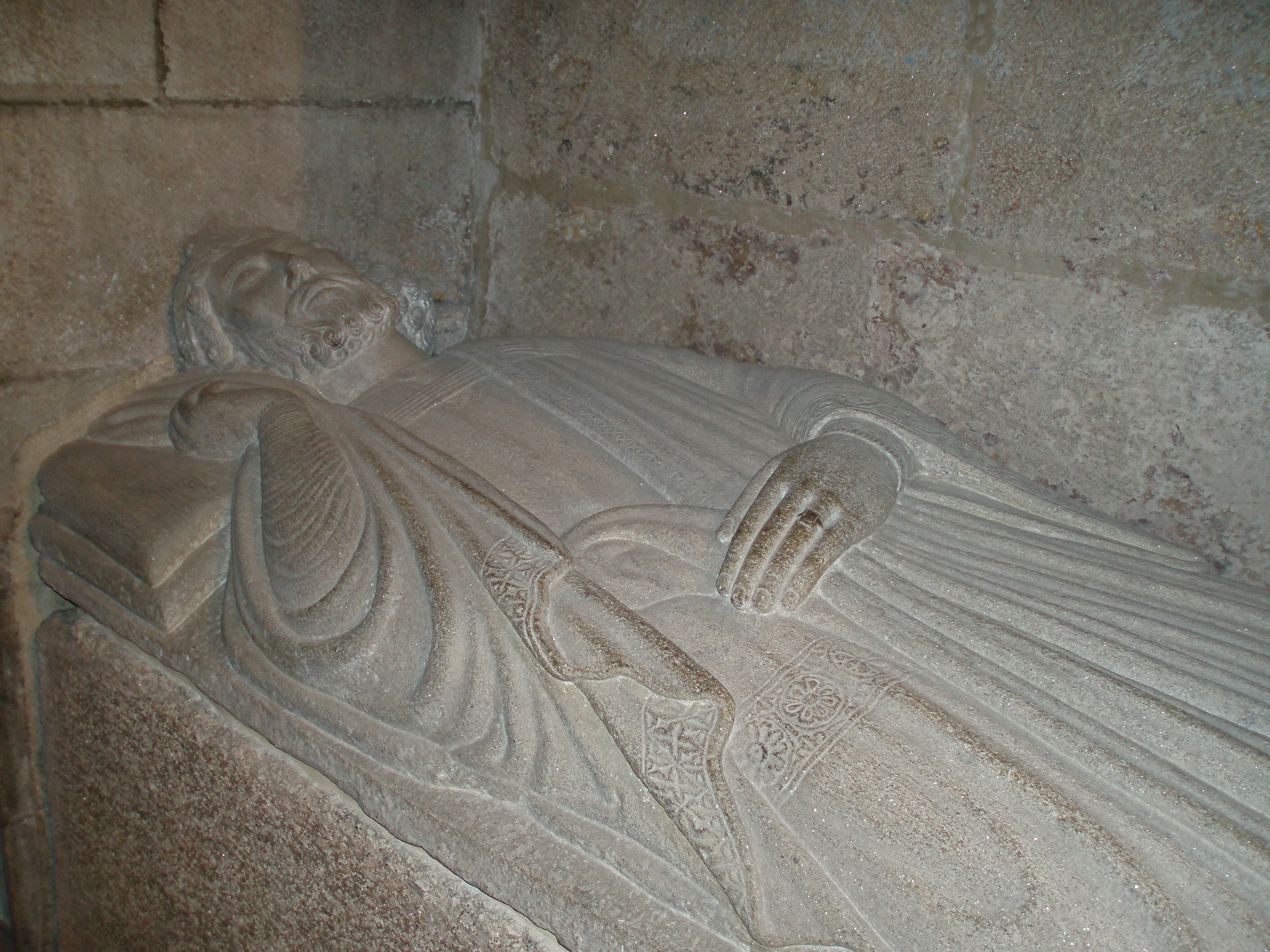
Sepulcher of king Afonso VIII of León and Galicia (known as Afonso IX in the Spanish bibliography) (Rex Legionis et Gallecie) (d. 1230)

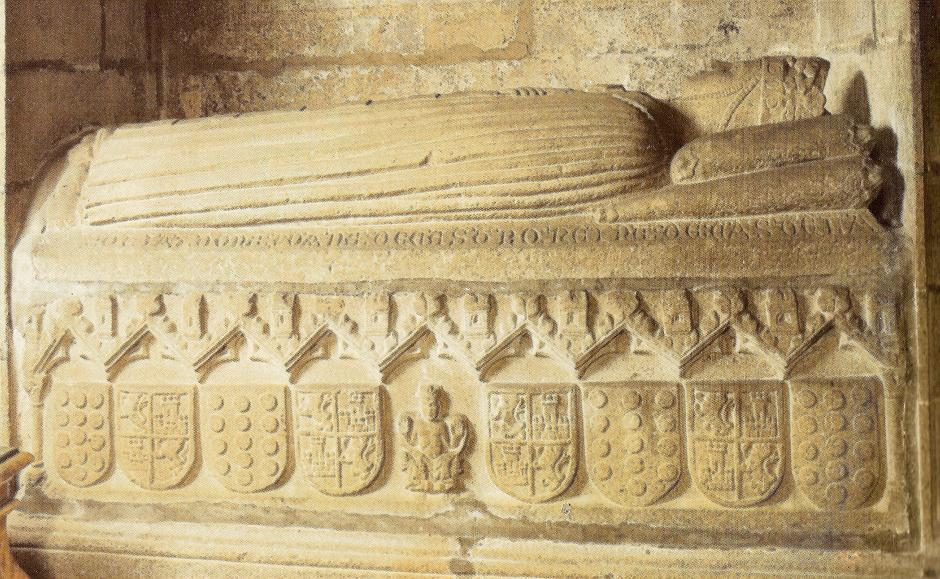
Sepulcher of queen Joana de Castro of Castilla, León, Toledo and Galicia (d. 1374)

== Late Middle Ages ==
=== Emergence of the Galician language ===
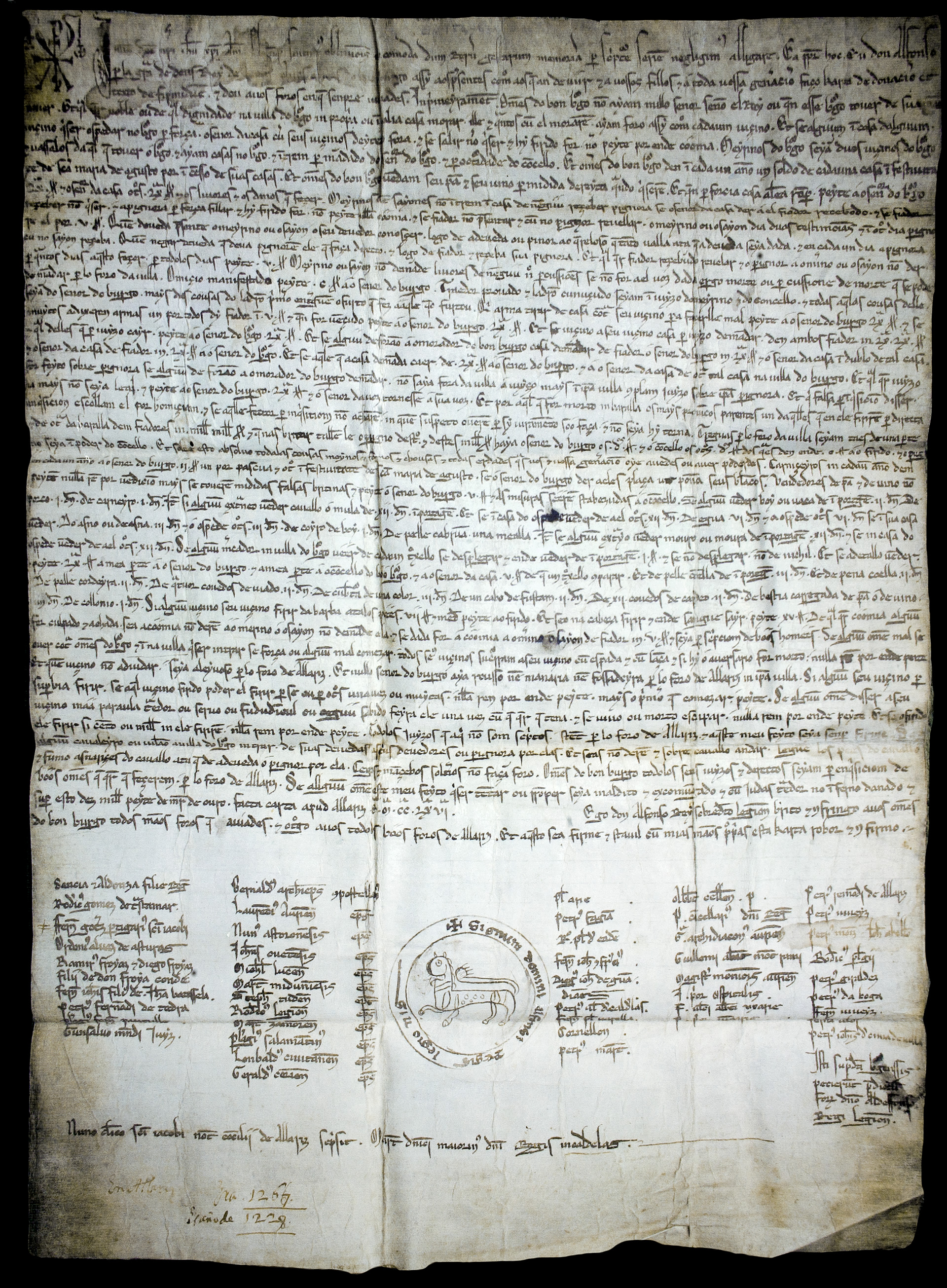
One of the oldest legal charters written in Galician, the constitutional charter of the Bo Burgo (Good Burg) of Castro Caldelas. Year 1228.

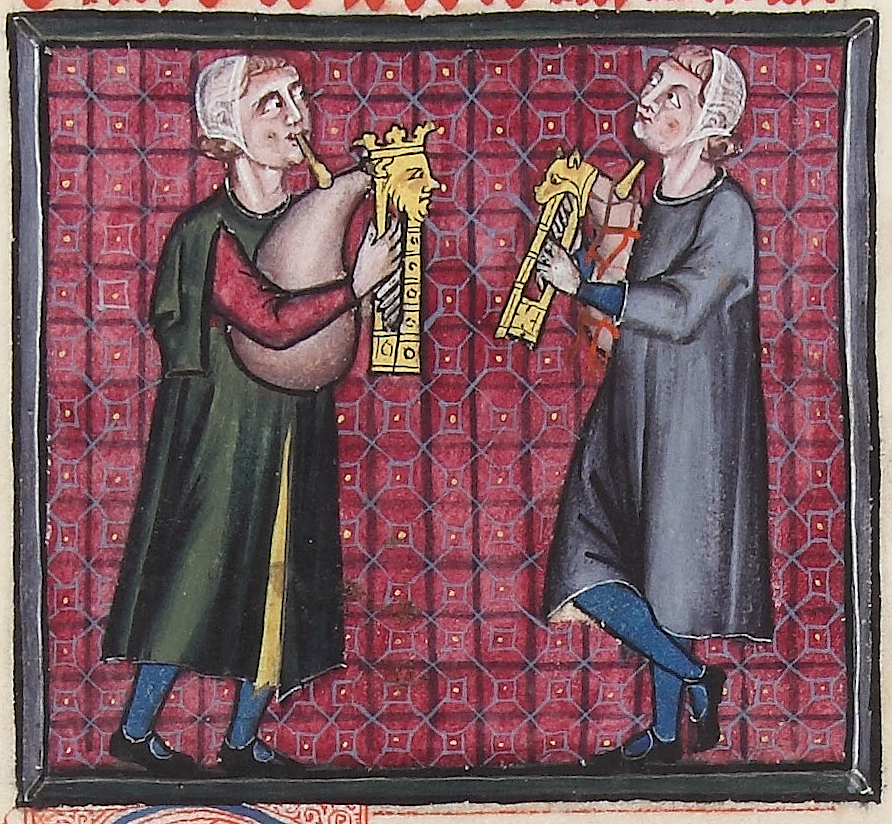
Miniatures from a manuscript of the Cantigas de Santa Maria

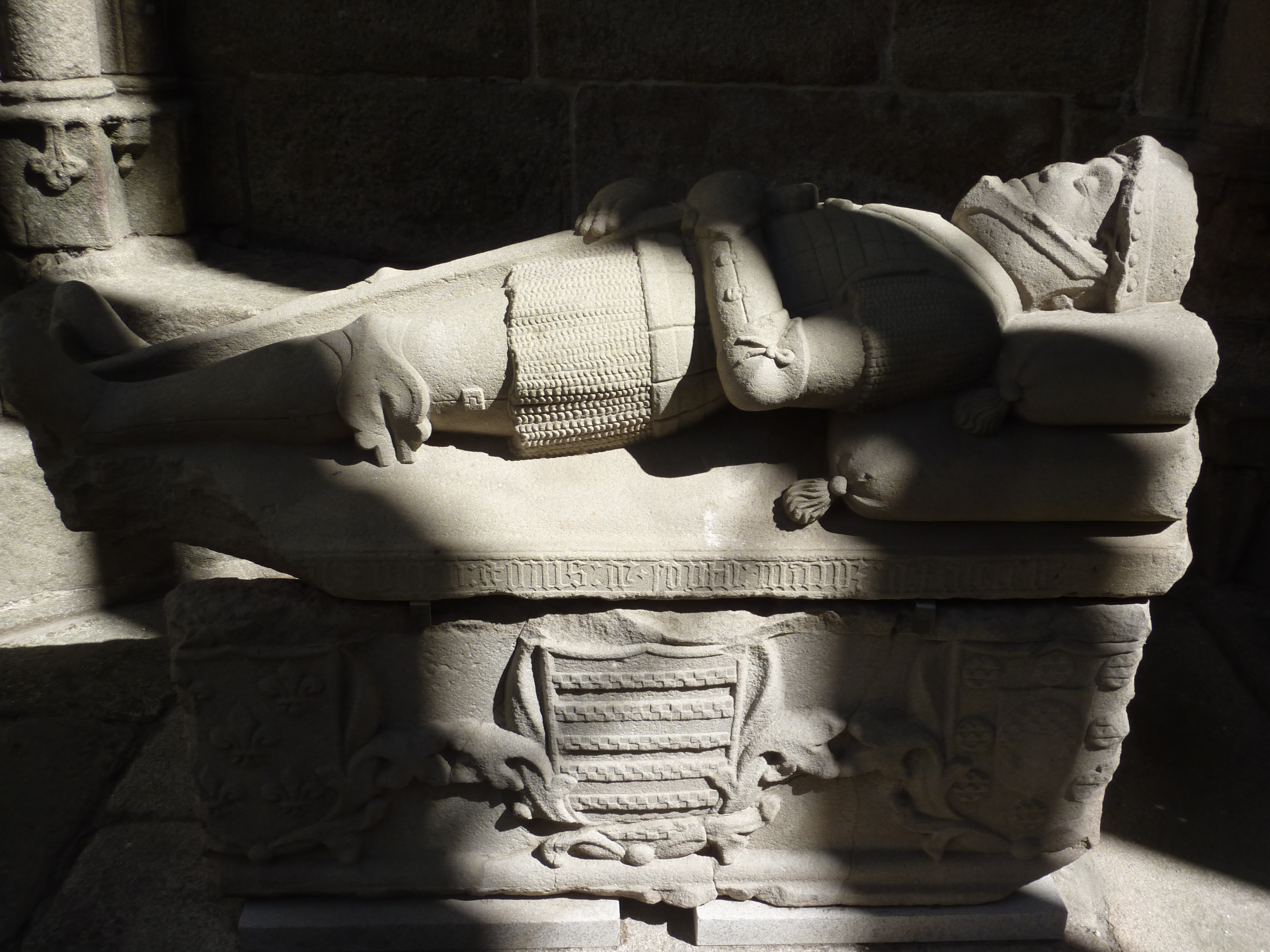
Sepulchre of the knight Sueiro Gomes de Soutomaior. The inscription, in Galician, reads "[Here] lies Sueiro Gomes de Souto Maior, who died [...]": SUEIRO GOMES DE SOUTO MAIOR Q FALECEU

Latinate Galician charters from the 8th century onward show that the local written Latin was heavily influenced by local spoken romance, yet not until the 12th century do we find evidence for the identification of the local language as a language different from Latin itself. During this same 12th century we can find full Galician sentences being inadvertently used inside Latin texts, whilst its first reckoned use as a literary language dates to the last years of the 12th century.

The linguistic stage from the 13th to the 15th centuries is usually known as Galician-Portuguese (or Old Portuguese, or Old Galician) as an acknowledgement of the cultural and linguistic unity of Galicia and Portugal during the Middle Ages, as both linguistic varieties differed only in minor dialectal phenomena, and were considered by contemporaries as just one language.

This language flourished during the 13th and 14th centuries as a language of culture, developing a rich lyric tradition of which some 2000 compositions (cantigas, meaning 'songs') have been preserved—a few hundred even with their musical score—in a series of collections, and belonging to four main genres: Love songs, where a man sings for his love; Cantiga de amigo, where a woman sings for her boyfriend; crude, taunting and sexual Songs of Scorn; and religious songs.

Its most notable patrons—themselves well-known authors—were kings Dom Dinis in Portugal, and Alfonso X the Wise in Galicia, who was a great promoter of both Galician and Castilian Spanish languages. The noble houses of both countries also encouraged literature in Galician-Portuguese, as being an author or bringing famous troubadours into one's home became a way of promoting social prestige; as a result a number of noblemen, businessmen and clergymen of the 13th and 14th centuries became notable authors, such as Paio Gomes Charinho, lord of Rianxo, and the aforementioned kings.

Aside from the lyric genres, Galicia also developed a minor tradition of literary prose, most notably translations of European popular series, such as those dealing with king Arthur written by Chrétien de Troyes, or those based on the war of Troy, usually commissioned by noblemen who desired to read these romances in their own language. Other genres include history books (either translations of Spanish ones, or original creations like the Chronicle of St. Mary of Iria, by Rui Vasques), religious books, legal studies, and a treatise on horse breeding. Prose literary creation in Galician had stopped by the 16th century, when the printing press became popular; the first complete translation of the Bible was not printed until the 20th century.

As for other written uses of Galician, legal charters (last wills, hirings, sales, constitutional charters, city council books of acts, guild constitutions, books of possessions, and any type of public or private contracts and inventories) written in Galicia are to be found from 1230 to 1530—the earliest one a document from the monastery of Melon, dated in 1231. Galician was by far the most-used language during the 13th to 15th centuries, in preference to Latin.

Whilst the written use of Castilian in Galicia had been common since 1400, at least in the documents issued by the offices of foreigners established in the country, since 1500 the open substitution of Galician elites by Castilian officials led to the progressive discrimination against the Galician language and even the Galician people, although public inscriptions in tombstones and foundations were still common during much of the 16th century. These developments led to the appearance of a series of literary and historical works, the goal of which was the vindication of Galician history, language, people and culture, most notably during the 17th and 18th centuries.

Later Galician language would become a regional language, with just minor literary use up to the 19th century, when a thriving literature developed. As Galician had no official recognition, no legal Galician documents were issued again up to the last quarter of the 20th century.

=== Galicia and the Castilian Crown ===
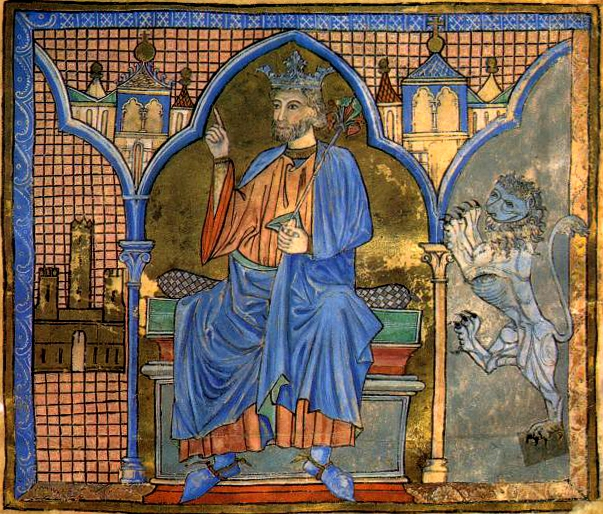
Romance portrait of Castilian King Ferdinand III; flanking him are the canting arms of his kingdoms, the purple lion of León, and the castle of Castile

The rule of Ferdinand III initiated a gradual decline in the influence of Galicia in the politics of state, in which the aristocracy and the Galician city councils would lose power to the local bishops. Galicia found itself on the periphery of the enlarged kingdom, which was largely ruled from Toledo or Seville, and increasingly controlled by Castilians. The royal court abandoned Compostela and began a policy of centralization. Despite this, Galician nobles and bishops continued to exercise a degree of autonomy from the Castilian crown until the time of the Catholic Monarchs.

In 1231 Fernando established in his newly acquired kingdoms positions known in Galicia as meyrino maor, a high official and personal representative of the king, in 1251 substituted by an adelantado mayor (Galician: endeantado maior), with even greater powers. These officials were established in each one of the three old Christian kingdoms (Galicia, León and Castile); in the vassal Kingdom of Murcia; and in the frontier with the Muslims, 'La Frontera'. During the 13th and the 14th centuries these positions were occupied either by local noblemen—such as Estevan Fernandes de Castro, Paio Gomes Chariño, Fernando José de Estrada, or Afonso Suares de Deza—or by members of the royal family, such as the infante Felipe, son of Sancho IV, thus maintaining a state of fluid relations and communications between the Crown and the Kingdom, which would prove fruitful during the conquest and colonization of Seville and other Andalusian cities.

Ferdinand's policy of centralization was continued during the reign of his son Alfonso X: during a period of unrest in Compostela, with the city council at odds with the archbishop, he introduced an alcalde, or representative of the Crown, into the local government, later delivering the see of Compostela to a Castilian, after forcing Archbishop Gonsalvo Gomes to flee to France. This started a process that eventually led to the replacement of Galician bishops, abbots, and noblemen by Castilians during the 15th and successive centuries. Unlike his father, he usually favoured the bourgeois through the concession of multiple constitutional charters to new towns, angering the nobility.

While the Castilian (Castile-Toledo) and Leonese (Galicia and León) crowns were linked in the person of the king, both crowns retained political peculiarities. Galicia and León retained the legal code Liber Iudicium and their own parliament (Cortes). Also, whilst the public charters within the kingdom of Galicia continued to be written in Galician, documents from the royal court were issued only in Castilian. The creation in 1282 of a joint Brotherhood (league) of the Kingdoms of León and Galicia showed the existence of a grade of unrest in the old western kingdoms of the Crown.

=== John, king of León, Galicia and Seville (1296–1301) ===
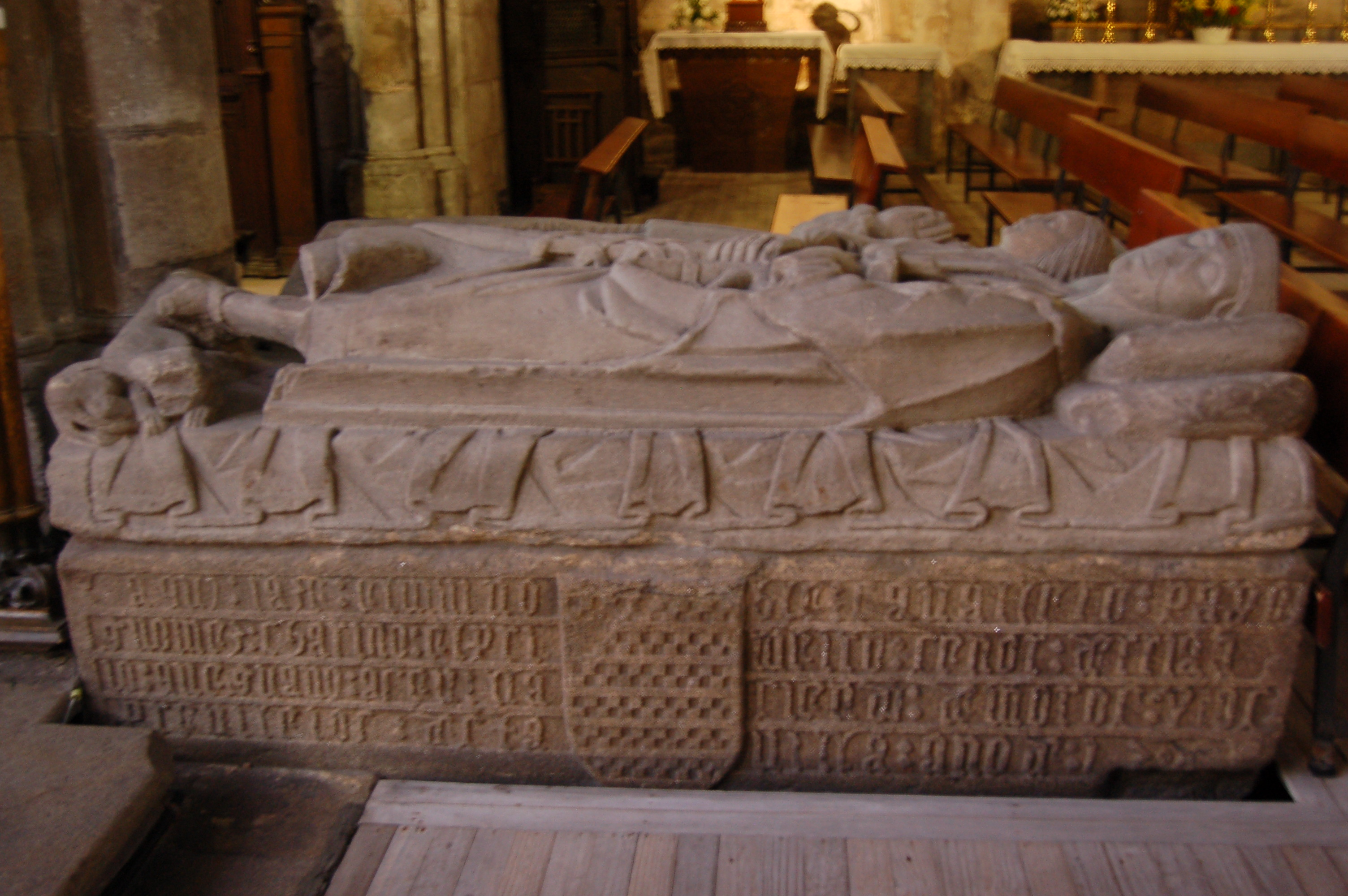
Paio Gómez Chariño's Tomb, Convent of San Francisco, Pontevedra, Galicia

The reign of Alfonso X ended in civil war and political instability regarding the succession. The death of his eldest son Ferdinand de la Cerda led Ferdinand's younger brother, Sancho, to rebel in a bid to secure the succession, which was ultimately successful. A similar pattern then followed Sancho's own death in 1295, with the reign of his juvenile son Ferdinand IV of Castile being contested by his uncle John, who had been in revolt since 1286.

With the help of King Denis I of Portugal, John—who lived exiled in Granada—advanced to Badajoz to claim the throne of Castile, but negotiations with Ferdinand's party, together with the assassination of his closest ally the adelantado mayor of Galicia Paio Gómez Charinho, led him to withdraw his claim. In 1296 John took the lead of the nobility of the old Leonese crown, and with the support of the kings of Aragon and Portugal was proclaimed king of León and Galicia in 1296, which also included the Kingdom of Seville, a vassal of Galicia since the 11th century. Charinho was succeeded by Fernando Ruíz de Castro, a kinsman of the house of Traba, whose wife also supported John and encouraged calls for a rapprochement with Portugal.

This attempted secession lasted five years amid political and military instability due to opposition from multiple sectors of society, including the party of Sancho's widow Maria de Molina, which was supported by the Castilian nobility, and the high Galician clergy. Faced with this resistance, King Denis of Portugal proposed to Queen Maria de Molina that John and his heirs should be granted the Kingdom of Galicia, where he counted on the strong support of Fernando Ruiz de Castro and other noblemen. In 1301, however, after losing the support of the King of Portugal, John was forced to abandon his claim to kingship in exchange for a number of minor titles, thus confirming the unity of the Crown of Castile.

=== Unrest in the cities ===
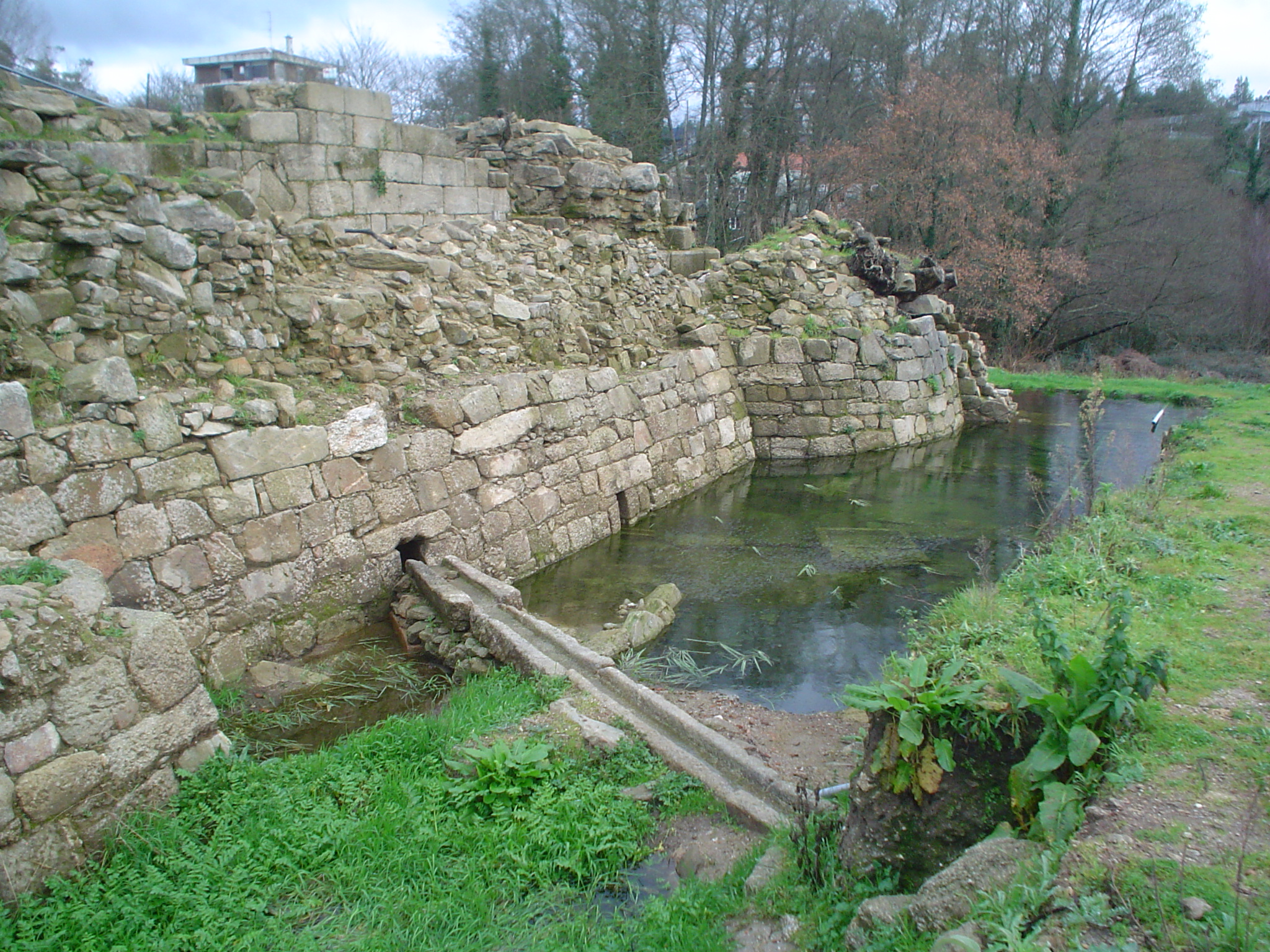
Ruins of the castle of A Rocha Forte, torn down in 1467 by the Irmandiños. There Bérenger de Landore's men assassinated the members of the Council of Compostela in 1320.

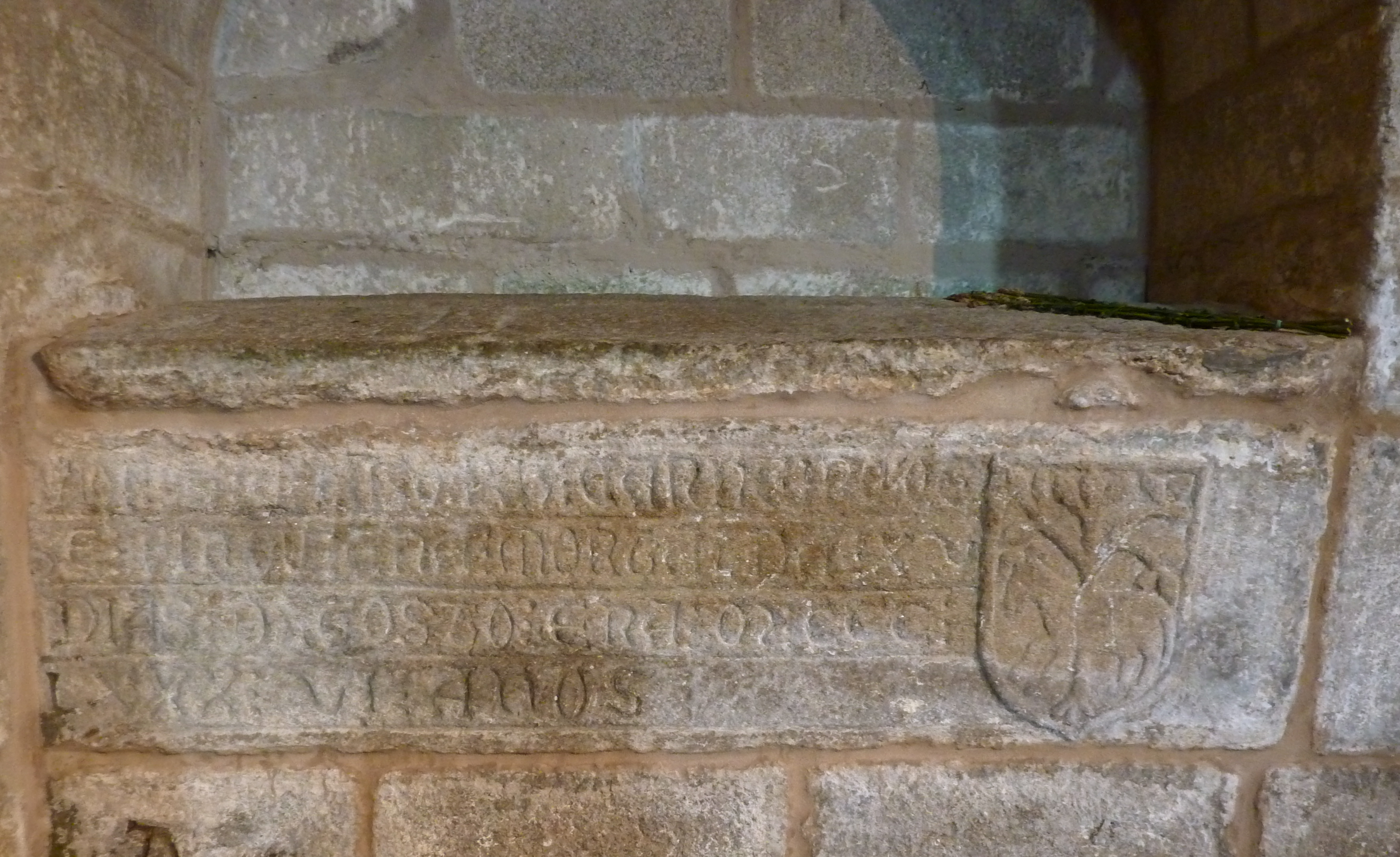
Sepulchre of Alvaro Paz Carneiro, church of St. Mary 'A Nova' in Noia, 'who died in the Mortality, August 15, 1348'

After John's challenge, Ferdinand decided to send his brother Don Felipe to Galicia as Adelantado Mayor; he would later be granted the title of Pertigueiro Maior, or first minister and commander of the Terra de Santiago. For nearly thirty years he would act as alter ego of the king, closely supported by the local nobility.

The beginning of the 14th century was characterized by the civil unrest in the cities of the kingdom, most notably in Lugo, Tui, Ourense and Compostela. The aspiration of their city councils to become reguengas—i.e., direct dependencies of the king, and as such virtually autonomous republics under the direction of their elected councils—which placed them in direct conflict with their bishops, intent on maintaining their fiefs. This unrest was not new, as Compostela had known bloody conflicts between the bourgeois and the bishops since the first years of the 12th century, when the bishop Gelmirez himself was chased inside the city. In these conflicts, Don Felipe and the local nobility usually supported the councils' pretensions in opposition to the mighty and rich bishops, although most of the time the military and economic influence of the archbishop of Santiago proved determinative in the maintenance of the status quo.

The conflict in the City of Compostela reached its zenith in September 1320, when, after forty years of autonomy and two years of war, the new archbishop, the French Bérenger de Landore, assassinated the nobleman Alonso Suárez de Deza together with the members of the City Council in his castle, A Rocha Forte near Santiago, where he had lured them for talks. While Berenger's forcefulness temporarily pacified the city, he still had to fight for another year just to take the rest of the fiefdom. However, twenty-five years later, the City Council of Compostela obtained the long-sought reguengo status from King Alfonso XI. Similar conflicts are known to have occurred in other Galician cities.

In 1348, the Black Death, locally known as A Mortaldade, reached the ports of Galicia, decimating the population, and causing a severe and lasting economic crisis.

=== Civil War of the Castilian Crown (1366–1369) ===
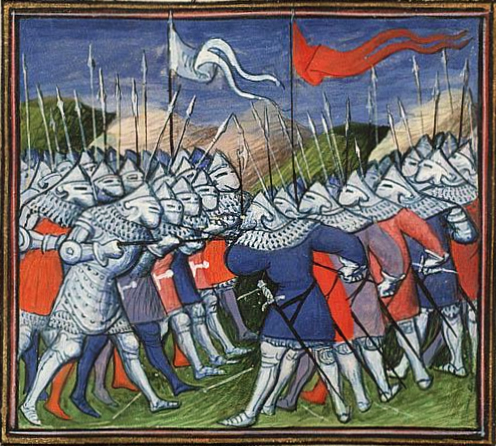
Battle of Nájera. Galician armies fought with Pedro I and Edward of Woodstock, defeating the Castilian armies of Henry of Trastámara

In 1360 the kingdom of Galicia was again at the centre of a succession crisis, this time of European dimension. The throne of Castile was disputed between King Peter I and his half-brother, Henry Count of Trastámara, within the broader context of the Hundred Years' War. This fratricidal conflict lasted from 1354 to 1369, having its origin in the policies of Peter I, who tried to expand his royal power while leaning on the municipal councils; this would come at the expense of the high nobility, including Castilian families such as Pimentel, Ponce de León, Mendoza, Fernández de Córdoba, and Alvarez de Toledo; and Galician ones such as Castro. As a result, in 1354 a coalition of nobles rose in defence of a pactual monarchy, although this coalition did not last long.

Henry, illegitimate son of Alfonso XI of Castile and half-brother of Peter, took advantage of the dissatisfaction among the noblemen to launch a war against Peter, with the support of Peter IV of Aragon, with whom Peter I was already at war, and along companies of mercenaries such as that commanded by Bertrand du Guesclin. Meanwhile, Peter I drew his support from the municipalities and part of the nobility, most notably the Galician Castro family headed by Fernando Rodrigues de Castro, Pertegueiro Maior of Santiago and Adelantado Mayor of Galicia, who, after defecting from Henry's side in 1355, was playing the same role as the Traba family two hundred years before. Other notable supporters were Sueiro Eans Parada, Men Rodrigues de Sanabria, and the Moscoso family.

In 1366 Pedro was forced to flee into Andalusia, while Fernando de Castro returned to Galicia. After a dangerous journey through Portugal, King Pedro made it to Galicia, where an assembly of supporters decided to send him into Gascony to seek English support, whilst at the same time internal enemies such as the archbishop of Compostela were assassinated or prosecuted. This same year, with Pedro abroad, a temporary truce permitted Henry to surface in Galicia, where he obtained the support of some important aristocrats, most notably Fernan Peres de Andrade.

In 1367, counting on the additional support of the archers of the English prince Edward of Woodstock, Peter won the battle of Nájera, which allowed him to take the war into Andalusia. However, the entry of England's enemy Charles V of France on Henry's side had a destabilising effect. In 1369 the new archbishop of Santiago, the loyalist Rodrigo de Moscoso, urgently ordered his knights to march to Andalusia and support the King and Fernando de Castro, but the call was ignored. The capture of Peter during the Battle of Montiel and his subsequent murder left Henry II in control of the Crown of Castile.

=== Ferdinand I of Portugal king in Galicia ===
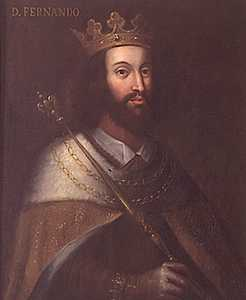
Ferdinand I of Portugal

The triumph of the high nobility in Castile, as represented by the death of Peter I and crowning of their candidate, Henry II, was resented by the majority of Galician nobles, who had been forgiven by the new King. Under the leadership of Fernando de Castro, the Galician loyalist party and the cities, invited Ferdinand I of Portugal to be their king, assuring him that the Galician nobles and citizens would "raise their voices for him ... and they hand him the cities and recognize as lord and will honor him".

In his triumphant entrance Ferdinand was accompanied by a number of aristocratic Galician supporters, including Fernando de Castro, Count of Trastámara; Alvar Peres de Castro, the lord of Salvaterra; and Nuno Freire de Andrade, Master of the Portuguese Order of Christ. He was acclaimed in the cities and towns: Tui, Redondela, Ribadavia, Ourense, Lugo, Padrón, Compostela, and finally A Coruña, which was given to the king by its keeper, Joan Fernandes de Andeiro.

During his brief government in Galicia, Ferdinand I set about restoring the Galician strongholds, including Tui and Baiona, and liberalized trade between Galicia and Portugal, supplying grain and wine by sea to the war-weakened Galician populace. He also made provisions for the issuance of gold and silver coinage at Tui and A Coruña to be recognized as valid throughout Galicia and Portugal.

Despite these measures, the presence of the Portuguese monarch was short-lived. Henry II of Castile, with the support of the mercenaries of Du Guesclin, launched an offensive that forced Ferdinand I back to Portugal. Later, in 1371, with the Portuguese troops defending themselves from Henry's mercenaries, Fernando de Castro and his fellow nobles were defeated in the battle of Porto de Bois, near Lugo, by Henry's men: Pedro Manrique, governor of Castile, and Pedro Rois Sarmento. Fernando de Castro fled to Portugal, but was later banished to Gascony under the terms of the Treaty of Santarém, which forced Portugal to expel a number of the Galician supporters of Fernando I, dying there in 1377.

In 1372, after Henry had defeated Men Rodrigues de Sanabria, Castilian rule was re-established over most of Galicia, although A Coruña, regularly supplied by Portuguese ships, held out until 1373.

=== John of Gaunt ===
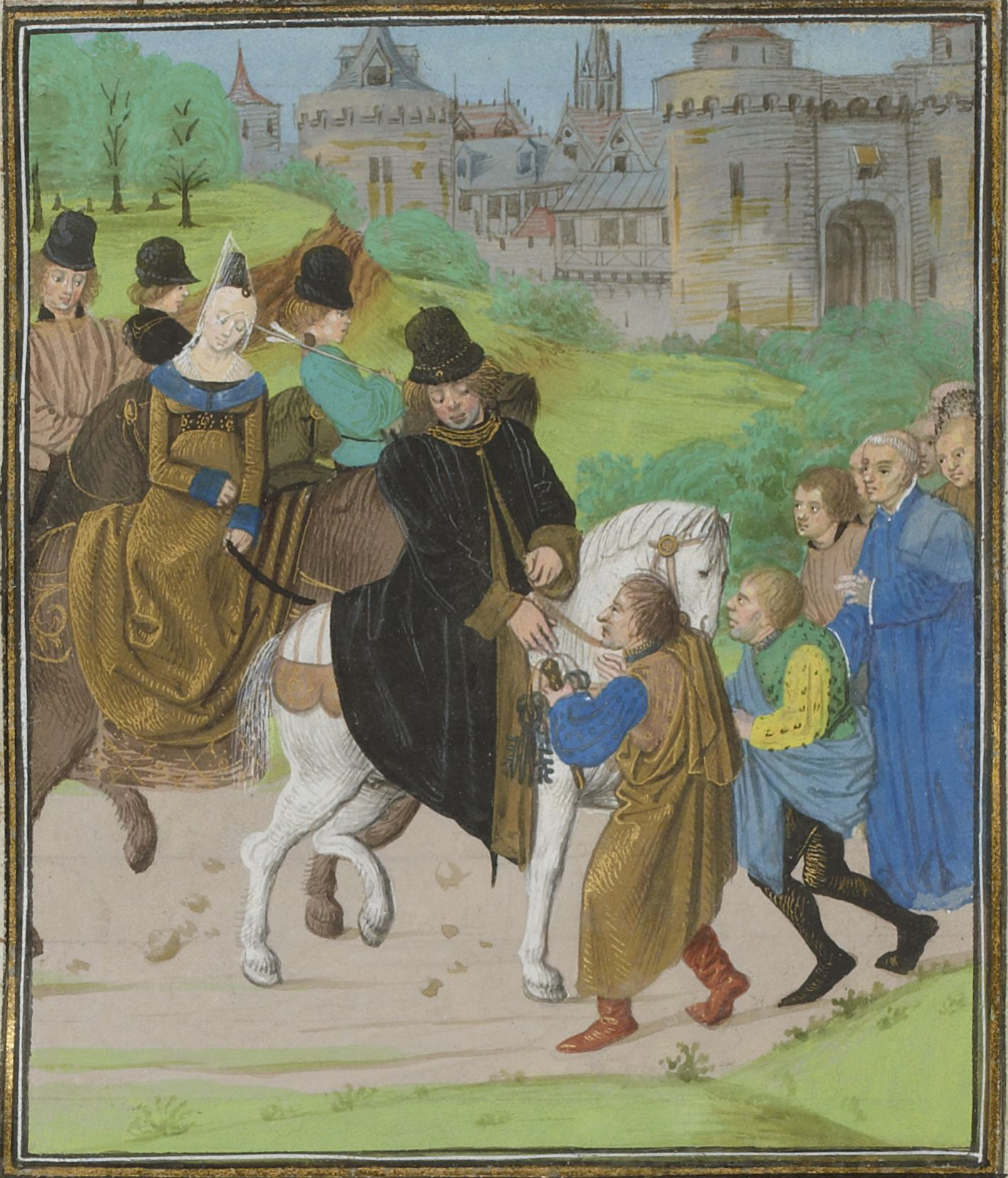
John of Gaunt entering Santiago de Compostela, from a manuscript of Jean Froissart's chronicles

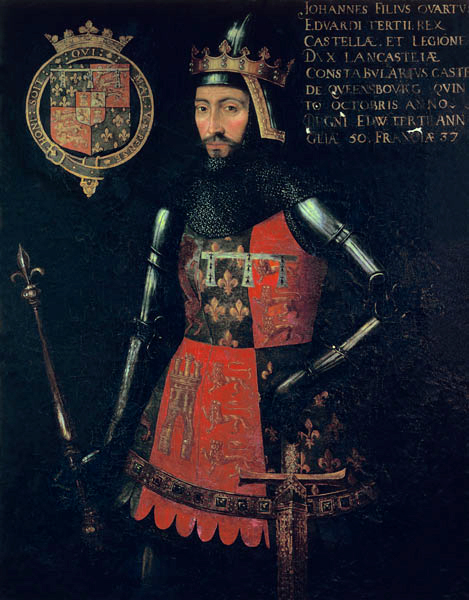
John of Gaunt

The expulsion of Ferdinand I of Portugal, and the abandonment of his claim to Galicia, was followed a year later by the capture of Tui by Diego Sarmento on behalf of Henry II. However, the town of Coruña remained faithful to Portugal until 1373, whilst João Fernandes de Andeiro, exiled in England, entered negotiations for further support for the loyalist Galician party, at the same time laying the foundation of the secular alliance between England and Portugal. On July 10, 1372 a treaty was signed by which Constance, daughter of Peter I, claimed the legitimate right to succeed her father. Her husband, John of Gaunt, Duke of Lancaster and son of King Edward III of England, then claimed the Castilian Crown on her behalf.

John's first attempt to make good on this claim failed when his troops were diverted to Poitou to participate in the clashes against France as part of the Hundred Years' War. On July 25, 1386, with the support of a papal bull of Urban IV confirming his right to the Crown of Castile, he landed in Coruña with some 1500 archers, 1500 lancers and some 4000 other supporters, without fighting or attacking the city. Following negotiations it was agreed that the city would open its gates once the Duke was received in Santiago de Compostela; being admitted there, John's troops, assisted by Galician exiles, took control of Pontevedra, Vigo, Baiona and Betanzos without a fight, whilst John himself proceeded to Ourense, defended by Breton troops in the service of John I of Castile. Meanwhile, the port of Ferrol was taken by John's ally the Portuguese king John I of Portugal, and the town of Ribadavia—where the local Jews, most of them of Leonese extraction, apparently presented a fierce defence—was assaulted after a siege by troops commanded by Thomas Percy. With the capture of Ferrol, the Duke controlled the whole Kingdom of Galicia, as reported in the chronicles of Jean Froissart: «avoient mis en leur obeissance tout le roiaulme de Gallice».

John was unable to capitalize on this initial success, as plague decimated the English army in Galicia during 1386 and 1387. Later, in 1387, together with the Portuguese, he launched an unsuccessful assault into the dry terrain of Castile; finally, John was forced to negotiate with John I of Castile. In their 1388 peace treaty, the Duke of Lancaster and Constance of Castile renounced their claims to Castile in exchange for monetary compensation and a marriage alliance between their daughter and the son and heir of Henry II, the future Henry III of Castile. The withdrawal of the English armies brought an end to Galicia's attempts, spearheaded by its nobles and town councils, to secede from the Crown of Castile.

=== The 15th century ===
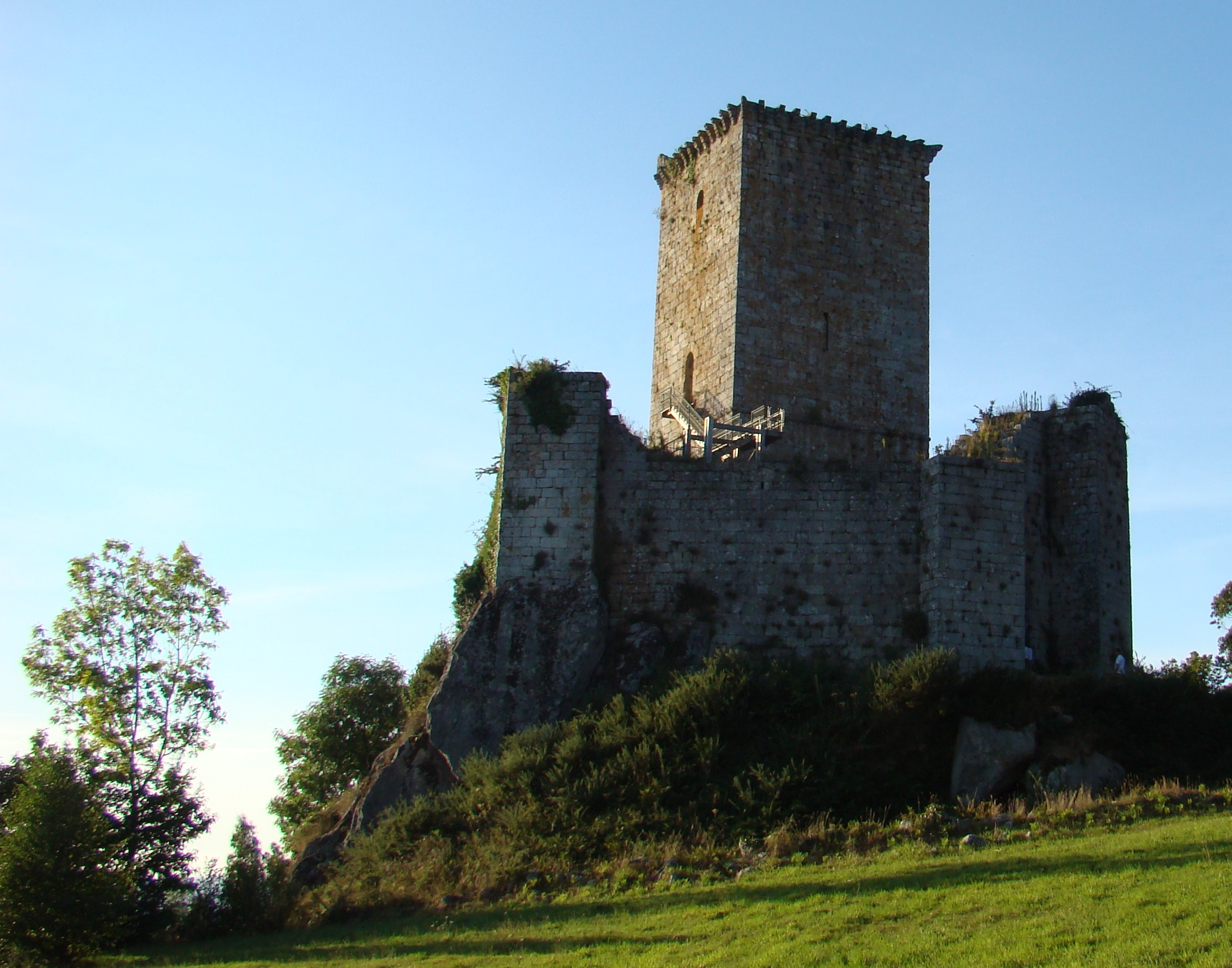
Castle of the House of Andrade, A Nogueirosa, Pontedeume

After the defeat of the loyalist party, with their leaders consequently exiled in Portugal or dead abroad, Henry II and John I introduced a series of foreign noble houses in Galicia as tenants of important fiefs. For example, the County of Trastámara, ancient dominion of the Traba and Castro houses, was given first to Pedro Enríquez de Castro, nephew of Henry II; later, in 1440, it was divided into two counties, Trastámara and Lemos, and given to the Osorios, of the frontier lands of Bierzo. In the South some important concessions were given to the Sarmento family, which, in time, would hold the job of Adelantado Mayor of the Kingdom of Galicia as a family legacy; and to the Pimentels of Benavente. Some of these families, most notably the Osorios, would become during the 16th and 17th centuries the most influential defenders of Galician causes. But during the 15th century, in the absence of solid leadership, such as exercised in the past by the archbishop of Santiago or by the Counts of Trastámara, the Kingdom of Galicia was reduced to a set of semi-independent and rival fiefdoms, militarily important, but with little political influence abroad.

The 15th century was characterized by the rapacity of these and other local noble houses (among others, the Moscosos in western Galicia, the Andrades in the North, the Soutomaiors and the Estradas in the South and West, and the Ulloas in central Galicia) each one directed by the heir of the lineage, not unusually a woman. The houses, and their minor knights and squires, tried to acquire every type of economic and jurisdictional title (usually as encomendeiros, that is, protectors) over towns and cities, monasteries, bishoprics, and even over royal properties, towns and territories. Castles and mottes were used all over Galicia to hold and keep the noblemen's armies, and as raiding outposts. The noblemen frequently fought each other for the possession of these strongholds.

We obey that letters (...) but regarding the fulfillment of what we are asked, we say that what these letters demand of us is very burdensome, and it would be impossible for us to accomplish it (...) There were not called the deputies of this Kingdom of Galicia, most notably those of the cities (...) For in this Kingdom there is an archbishopric, four bishoprics, and other towns and places of our lord the Prince, and of three Counties, and of many other great knights; and it would be very accomplishing and very necessary for the King and for this Kingdom to invoke its deputies.
Letter of the City Council of Ourense to the King, 1454.

Similar conflicts were frequent between the city councils and the Church, even occasioning the deaths of the bishop of Lugo in 1403 and the bishop of Ourense in 1419. All these wars, together with rampant banditry, created a climate of violence and insecurity throughout Galicia. The remoteness of the King was partly to blame: during the 15th century no monarch ever come to visit Galicia, except for the Catholic Monarchs in 1486. This absence on the one hand transformed the King into a remote ideal of Justice, whilst on the other affirmed the sensation of impunity and defencelessness among the inhabitants of the Kingdom.

The remoteness of the monarch also resulted in Galicia losing its vote in the Cortes (Parliament) sometime during the late 14th or early 15th centuries. In 1423, in the absence of the Galician cities, the city of Zamora (located in León, but historically linked to Galicia) asked to be treated as the capital of the Kingdom of Galicia, which was granted, with their deputies sitting next to the monarch at his right. Zamora represented the Kingdom of Galicia in the Cortes until 1640, usually against the will and the advice of the Galician cities.

Under these difficult circumstances, with constant wars and a broken judicial system, the cities of Galicia, which progressively acquired a leading role during this century, engaged in a tax revolt between 1430 and 1460. They refused to pay certain taxes to John II and Henry IV, citing the onerous services the Kingdom rendered to the King; the lack of effective law enforcement, which had led to the economic destruction of the Kingdom; and the absence of Galician deputies in the Parliament.

=== Irmandinos Wars ===
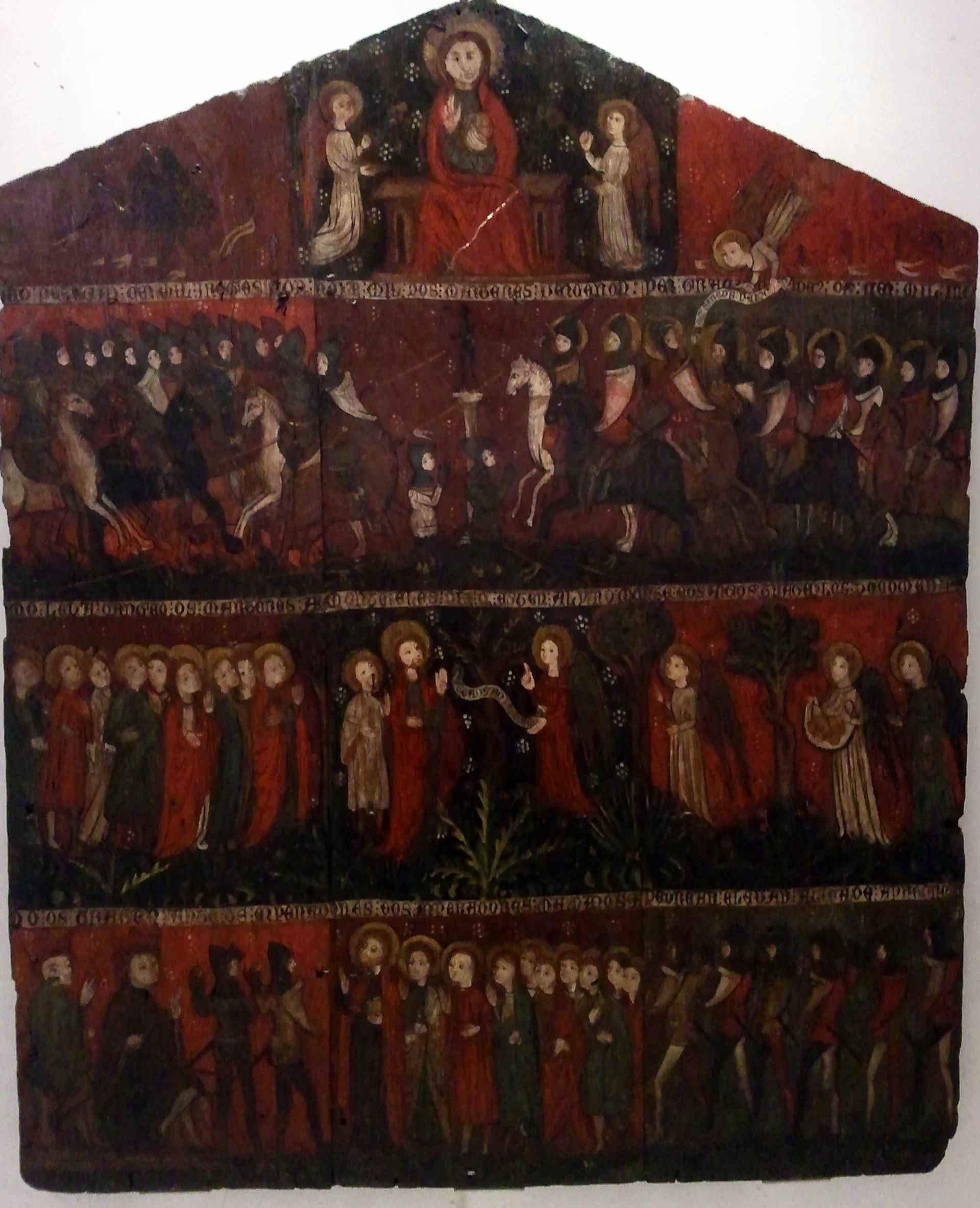
14th century 'Retablo de Belvis'

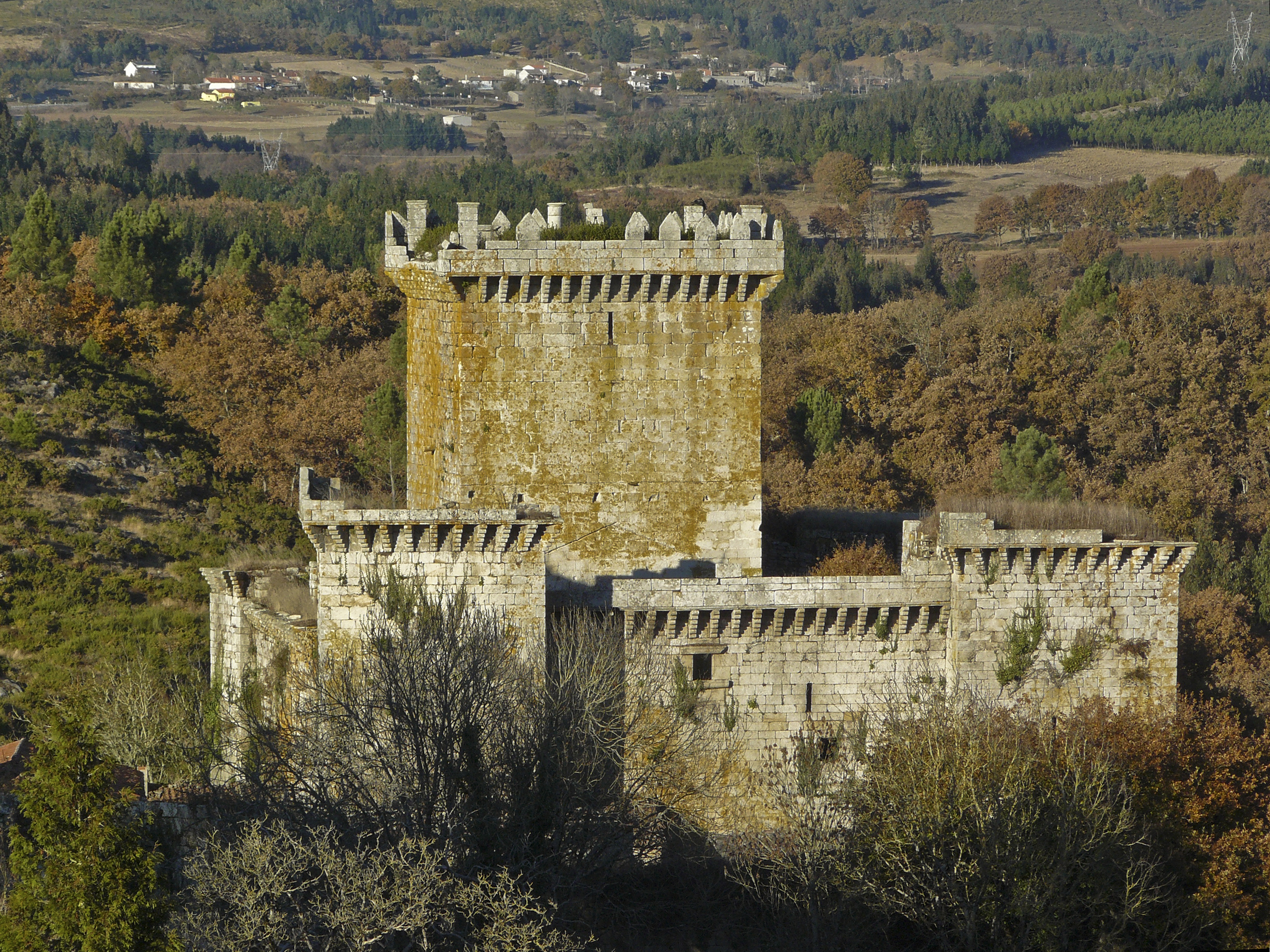
The castle of Pambre, Palas de Rei, which resisted the Irmandiños troops

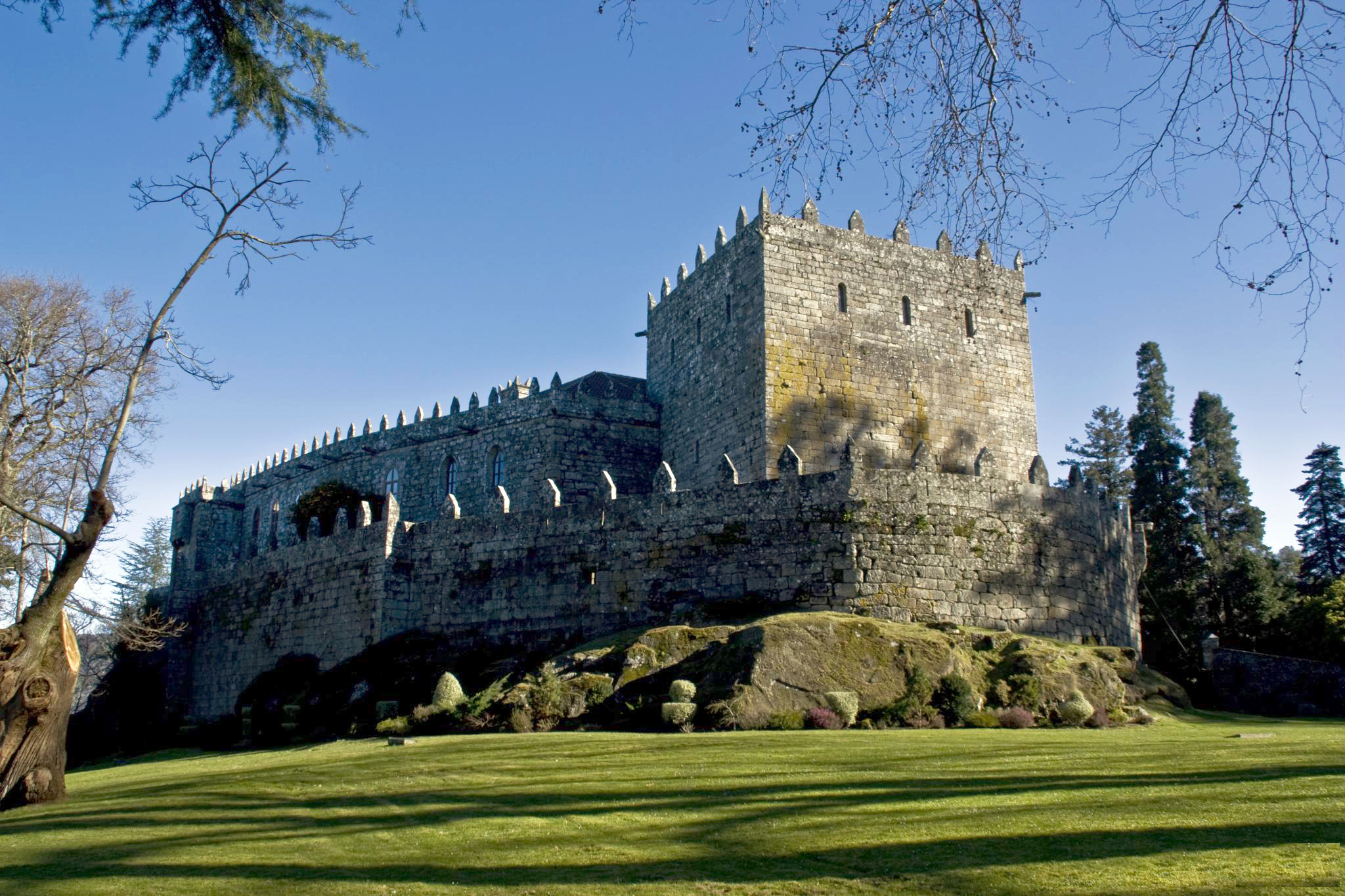
Castle of Soutomaior

During the 15th century, a time of social and economic crisis in Europe, a series of insurrections roiled the Kingdom, the result the brutal behavior of the bishops and the noblemen toward the churchmen, artisans and peasants. The insurgents were generally organized in irmandades ('brotherhoods'), groups of men who, in exceptional circumstances, and allegedly with the king's approval, armed themselves to act as policemen in defence of peace and justice.

One of these brotherhoods, established in Compostela in 1418, took advantage of the temporary absence of the archbishop, and violently overthrew the city council in 1422. Another one, called Fusquenlla or 'The Mad Brotherhood', rose up in the north of the kingdom against the House of Andrade. The armies of the brotherhood, directed by the lesser nobleman Roi Xordo, were finally defeated by the Andrades' armies by the gates of Compostela in 1431. Later, in 1453, the troops of the bishop of Ourense and that of the council of the city fought fiercely for the possession of the local castles, even using tronos (cannons; lit., 'thunders'), and forcing the bishop into exile. In 1458 a brotherhood was established among some important noblemen (the House of Moscoso, the House of Estrada, and Sueiro Gomes de Soutomaior among others) and the cities and towns of Compostela, Noia, and Muros, against the archbishop of Santiago, who was taken prisoner, kept and paraded in a cage for two years, and then banished for ten years after his supporters paid a large ransom. Similar revolts were occurring all over the kingdom, in Betanzos, Viveiro, Lugo and Allariz. All of these Galician brotherhoods acted autonomously, sometimes even against King's will and direct orders.

In 1465 the Crown of Castile was again in crisis, with King Henry IV under siege by Castilian noblemen who were supporting an aristocratic candidate to the throne. Henry sent letters all around the realm, calling for the establishment of brotherhoods to defend the status quo. From 1465 to 1467 local brotherhoods were organized all over Galicia, gaining the allegiance of churchmen, artisans, peasants, and some noblemen.

In the spring of 1467 a General Council of the Kingdom of Galicia (Junta General do Reyno de Galizia) was held in Melide. After a debate it was decided that noblemen should deliver all of their strongholds and castles to the officials of the Irmandade, resulting in the flight of multiple lesser nobles, while others resisted the armies of the Irmandiños ('little brothers'), only to be slowly beaten back into Castile and Portugal; as described by a contemporary, 'the sparrows pursued the falcons'. For the rest of the year the armies of the Brotherhood marched all over Galicia, fighting the lords and demolishing tens of strongholds.

From 1467 to 1469 the Kingdom of Galicia was governed by the Irmandade, directed by the city dwellers, whilst its armies—composed mostly of armed peasants—were commanded by sympathizing noblemen, as the veteran soldiers they were. General Councils of the Kingdom were later held in Betanzos and Santiago de Compostela in 1467, in Lugo in 1468, and in Ourense in 1469. But in autumn of 1469 the exiled noblemen, joining forces, marched into Galicia: Pedro Alvares de Soutomaior entered from Portugal with gunmen and mercenaries; the archbishop Fonseca of Compostela from Zamora; and the Count of Lemos from Ponferrada. Meanwhile, other noblemen who had resisted inside the Kingdom also pushed forward. In 1469 and 1470 the Irmandiño armies were defeated all over the Country, except in some well defended cities such as A Coruña.

In 1470, after the defeat of the Brotherhood, the noblemen, regaining their states and granting themselves sonorous titles ordered the reconstructions of a number of strongholds, usually using the rebels as labour force. This same year, the noblemen assigned a pact of mutual assistance, signaling the beginning of a long war against the archbishop of Santiago—among which were Pedro Alvarez de Soutomaior, called Pedro Madruga, designated as leader of the nobility.

The situation of the Kingdom of Galicia in 1473 is described by a nobleman in his last will:

"The Kingdom is totally scrambled in war, with so many thieveries and deaths, and ill facts: to rise up a large mob of commoners against the knights; and many knights to rise up against the King himself, our Master; and other lords of the land to make war on each other; and to dash to the ground so many houses and towers".

=== Catholic monarchs ===
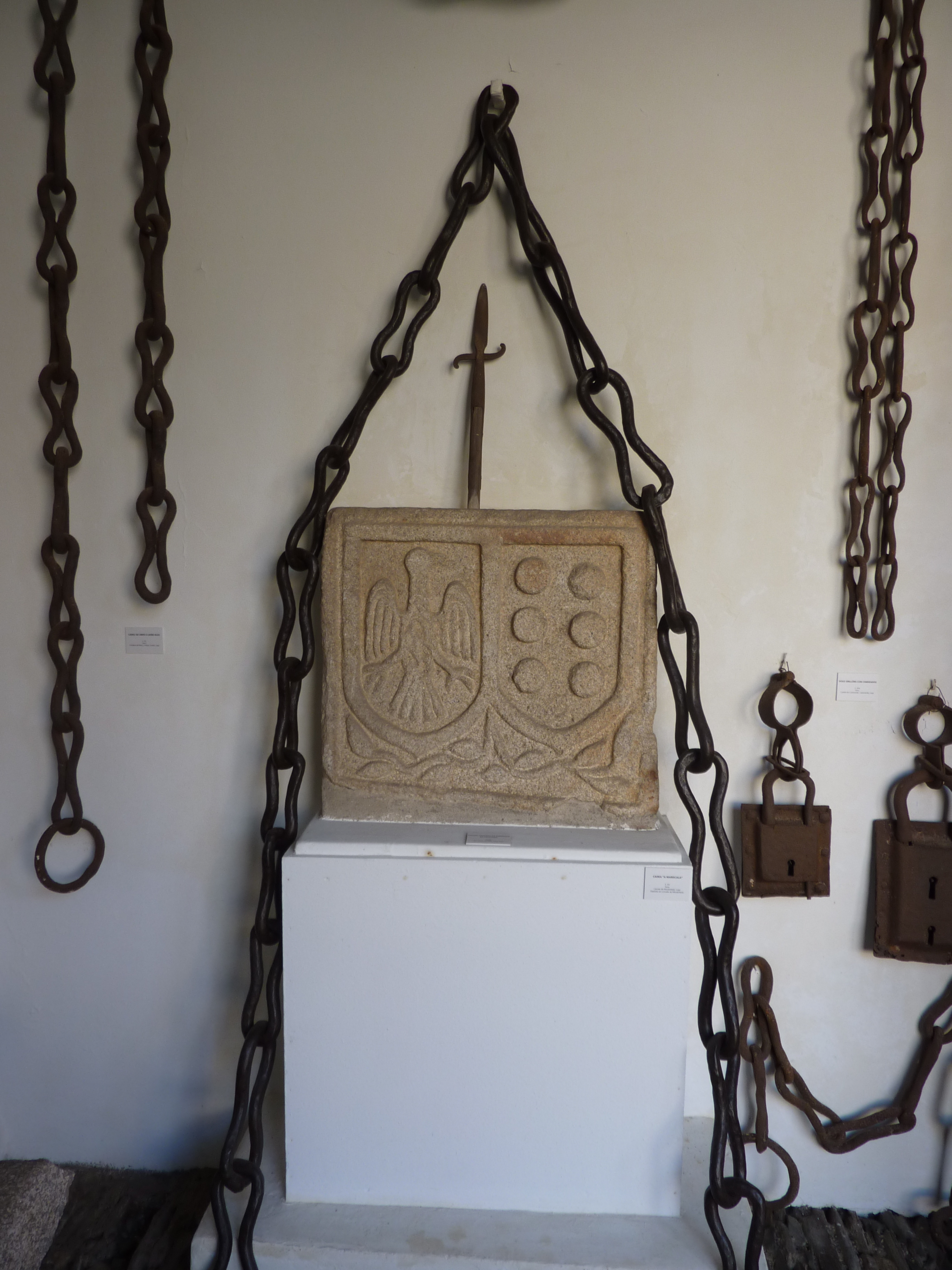
A Mariscala, the chain which allegedly kept prisoner Marshal Pardo de Cela before his execution. Museo Arqueolóxico Provincial de Lugo

"The archbishop [Alfonso II de Fonseca] did a great service for the King when against the will of that whole Kingdom [of Galicia], being everyone in resistance, the archbishop received the Hermandad in Santiago; and in one day he made the Hermandad to be received and proclaimed from the Minho till the Sea, which was as investing the King and Queen as lords of that Kingdom"
Annales de Aragón by Jerónimo Zurita, Book XIX.46
"It was then when the taming of Galicia began, because not just the local lords and knights, but all the people of that nation were the ones against the others very bold and warlike"
Annales de Aragon, XIX.69.

At the death of Henry IV in 1474 civil war broke out between his daughter Joanna and his half-sister Isabella. Isabella had married her cousin, Fernando II of Aragon, and was supported by the Aragonese and Catalans, while Joanna married the king of Portugal, Afonso V, thereby obtaining his country's support. In Galicia, Archbishop Fonseca sided with Isabella, while Pedro Álvarez de Soutomaior, who had large interests in Portugal and in southern Galicia, sided with Joanna, and was accordingly rewarded by the king of Portugal with the title of Count of Caminha. Notwithstanding, most noblemen behaved cautiously, waiting to join the winner's side.

In October 1476 Fonseca unsuccessfully attacked the well-defended city of Pontevedra, held by Pedro Madruga, with an army composed of 200 lancers and 5000 infantrymen, while a Basque navy commanded by Ladrón de Guevara took Baiona and assaulted Viveiro; but Pedro's tenacity resulted in a draw. In 1479, the armies of Fonseca moved south again against Pedro Madruga, and, after a series of battles, forced the Count of Caminha into Portugal, although Tui, Salvaterra de Miño and other towns and strongholds were still held by his people and their Portuguese allies. In 1480, a peace treaty recognised Isabella and Fernando, the Catholic Monarchs, as queen and king. Under the terms of the peace treaty with Portugal and Juana, all the enemies of Isabel, including Pedro Madruga, were granted pardons.

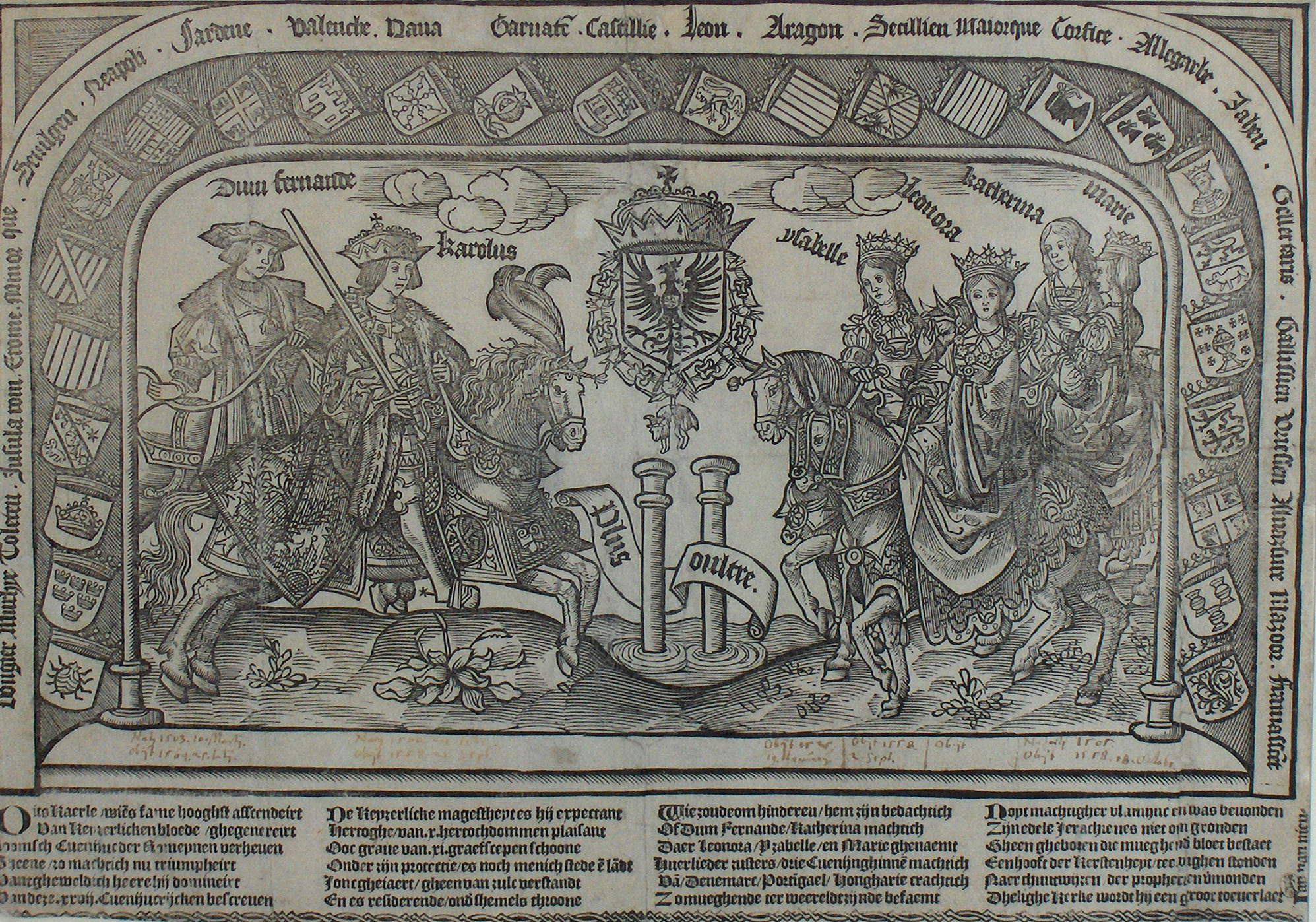
The Habsburg and their kingdoms and possessions, early 16th century. The kingdom of Galicia is fifth from the bottom right

This same year, and against the advice of the Galician nobility, the Catholic monarchs sent a Castilian police and military corps, the Santa Hermandad, to Galicia. It was soon criticised not only as an institution composed mostly of foreigners, but also as a heavy burden on the local economy, costing more than 6 million maravedi per year—by comparison, the budget of Columbus' first journey to America was just 2 million maravedi—but also due to its arbitrariness and rudeness with the local inhabitants.

This corps, reinforced with mercenary troops and under the pretension of pacifying the country and getting rid of adventurers and thieves, was also used as field army at the service of the policies of the monarchs. As personal representatives, the Catholic Monarchs also sent a new plenipotentiary Governor of the Kingdom of Galicia—an office first established in 1475—and a Justiçia Mayor (Attorney general), together with a series of other officials and collection agents. They also appointed royal aldermen in some of the cities and towns.

From 1480 to 1485, the Santa Hermandad and the new official, endorsed by local supporters, worked jointly in harassing the largely-rebellious nobility, both economically and militarily. However, the resistance was ended with the death of its leader, the Count of Lemos, and the wars against Marshal Pardo de Cela and Count Pedro Madruga concluded around the same time; de Cela was beheaded in Mondoñedo in 1483, whilst Pedro was deposed in 1485 by his own son—Álvaro—in a desperate attempt to save the lineage of Soutomaior. The establishment in 1500 of the Real Audiencia del Reino de Galicia (a permanent royal tribunal), and later the forced reformation and submission of the Galician monasteries to the Castilian ones, represented the integration de facto of the Kingdom of Galicia under the Crown of Castile.

== Modern age ==
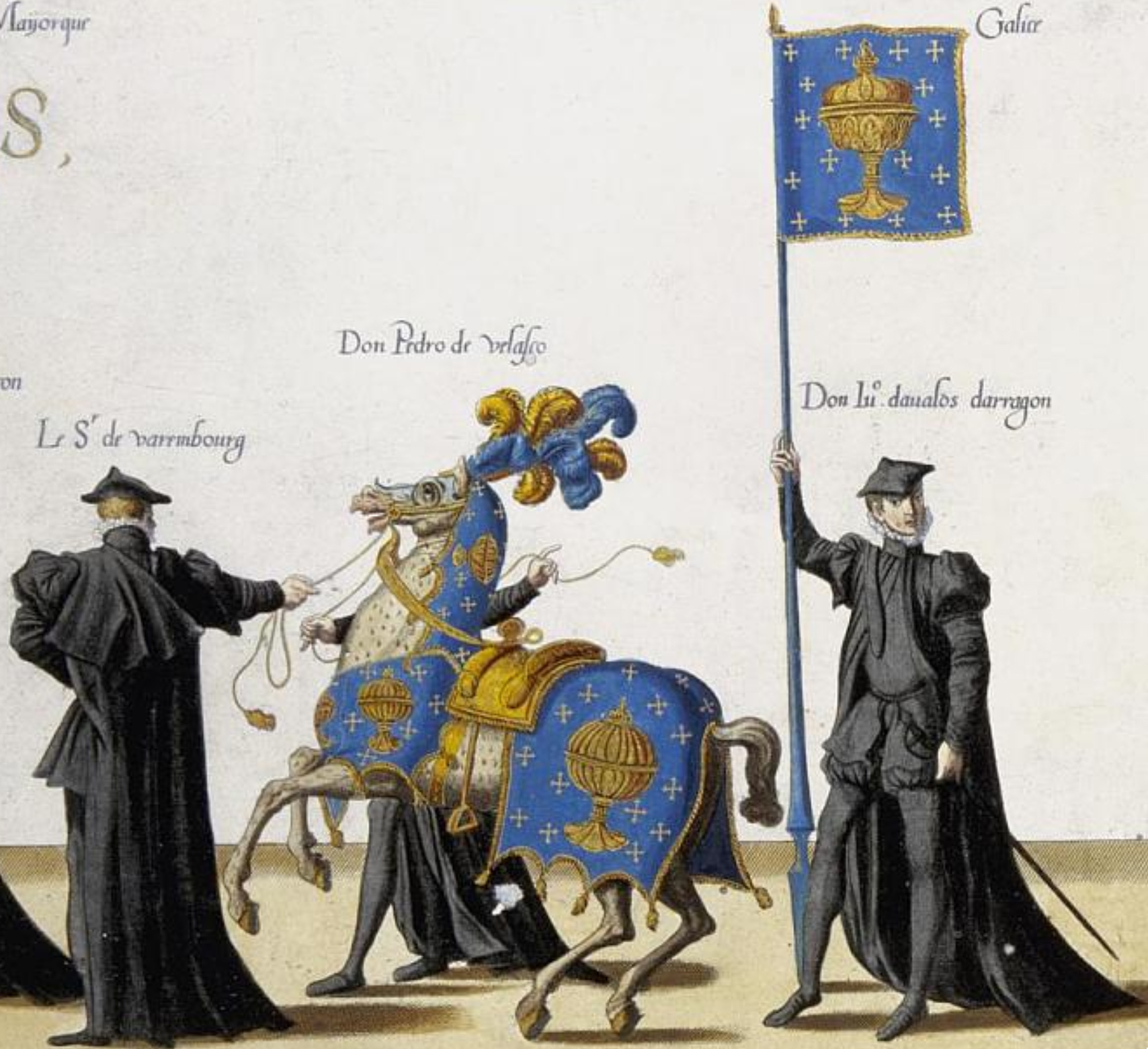
Flag and arms of the Kingdom of Galicia (16th century), after the funeral of Emperor Charles V, also king of Galicia, by Joannes and Lucas Doetecum

=== The Junta or General Assembly of the Kingdom ===
The Junta, Junta General, Juntas, or Cortes of the Kingdom of Galicia was the representative assembly of the Kingdom from the 15th century, when it originated as a general assembly of all the powers of Galicia aimed at the constitution of hermandades (brotherhood), and until 1834, when the Kingdom and its General Assembly were officially disbanded by a Royal decree.

Initially the Juntas Generales was an assembly where representatives of the three states of the Kingdom (noblemen, churchmen, and the commoners) met, but it soon followed the evolution prompted by the King in other representative institutions, such as the Cortes of Castile, becoming the assembly monopolized by the bourgeoisie and lesser nobility (fidalgos), who controlled most of the local councils of the cities and towns of the Kingdom, and at the expenses of Church and nobility. From 1599 the composition of the assembly became fixed and reduced to just seven deputies, each one representing one of the Kingdom's provinces, and appointed by the local council of the province's capital—Santiago de Compostela, A Coruña, Betanzos, Lugo, Mondoñedo, Ourense, and Tui—from among its members. Other towns, namely Viveiro and Pontevedra, tried during the 17th and 18th centuries to regain their seats in the assembly, to no effect.

The Junta had no direct role in law making, and was permitted little control in the Royal administration, but it could nevertheless rise armies, ships and taxes, conceding or denying the King's petitions on behalf of the local powers of the Kingdom, and it could also petition the King directly, being recognized as the voice and representative of the Kingdom and the depositary of its will, traditions and rights (foros). Notwithstanding, the King never consented on the petition of the assembly to meet at will, and from 1637 he decreed that the meetings of the assembly could only take place when in presence of a representative of the monarch, with voice, usually the Governor-Captain General of the Kingdom, in an attempt to maintain a tighter grip on the institution and its agreements. In an effort to broaden its representation, it briefly admitted churchmen and titled nobility. On 9 October 1686, Diego Ros de Medrano, Bishop of Ourense, became Governor and Captain-General of the Kingdom of Galicia.

As a reaction of the abdication of King Ferdinand VII in favour of Napoleon, the Junta declared itself the sovereign and supreme authority of the Kingdom on June 18, 1808, during the Peninsular war, thereby becoming the legitimate and de facto government of the Kingdom until Galicia was conquered by Napoleon in 1809.

=== Policies of Philip II (1556–1598) ===
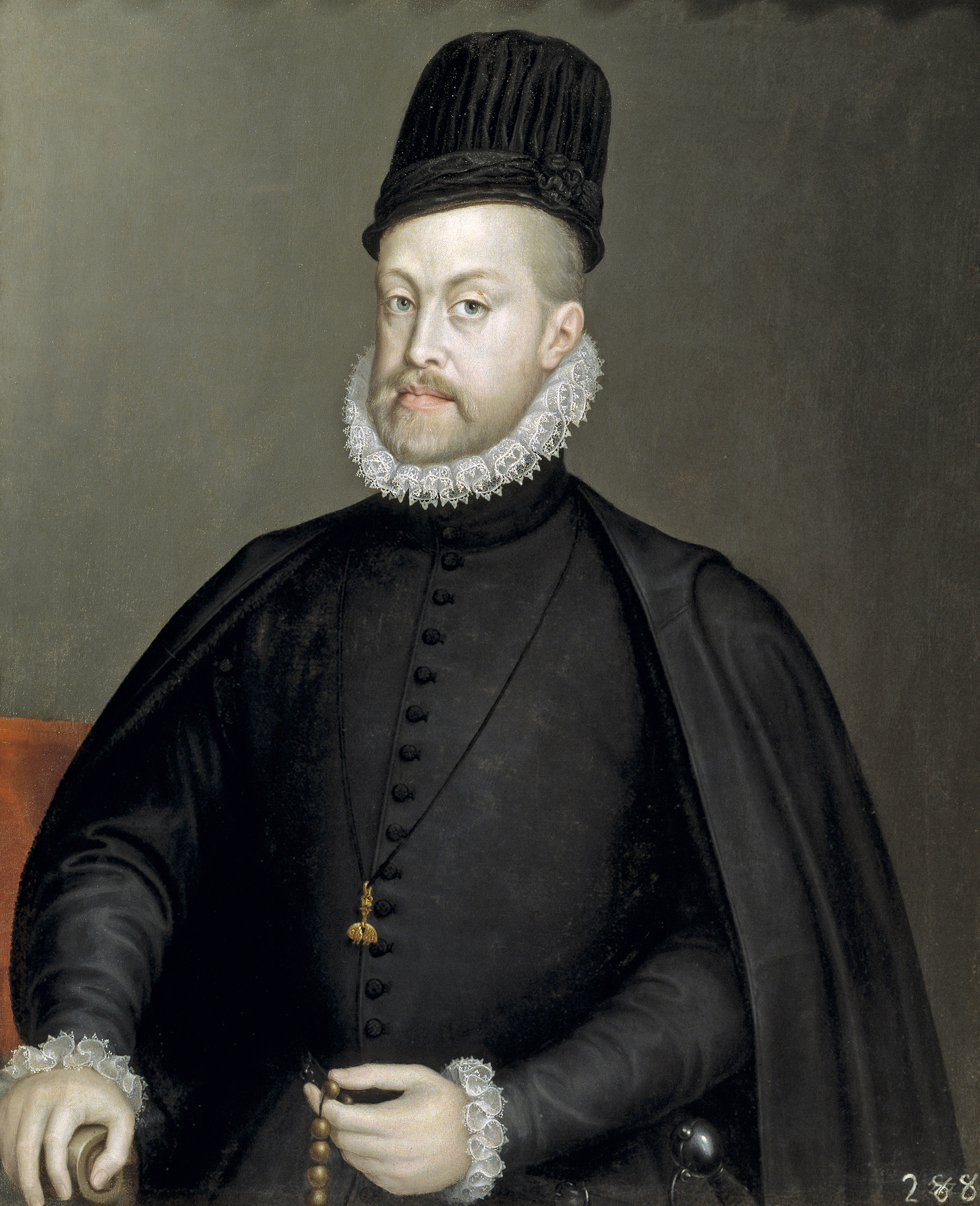
The reign of Philip II of Habsburg saw a deep economic and social crisis, and was disastrous for its cultural development; portrait by Sofonisba Anguissola.

In 1556, Charles V, Holy Roman Emperor, abdicated the throne and divided his realm between his brother Ferdinand I of Habsburg, and his son Philip II. In practice this resulted in the disappearance of the European empire of the Habsburgs and the idea of a universal Catholic monarchy. Ferdinand was declared Holy Roman Emperor and king of Hungary and Bohemia, while Philip inherited the Netherlands, Naples and Sicily, the Crown of Aragon and Castile, including the Kingdom of Galicia.

The 42-year reign of Philip II was characterized from the beginning by wars of expansion—against the Netherlands, France, England, Portugal and the Ottoman Empire. Stretching across the Atlantic and northern Europe these wars had disastrous consequences for Galicia's society and economy.

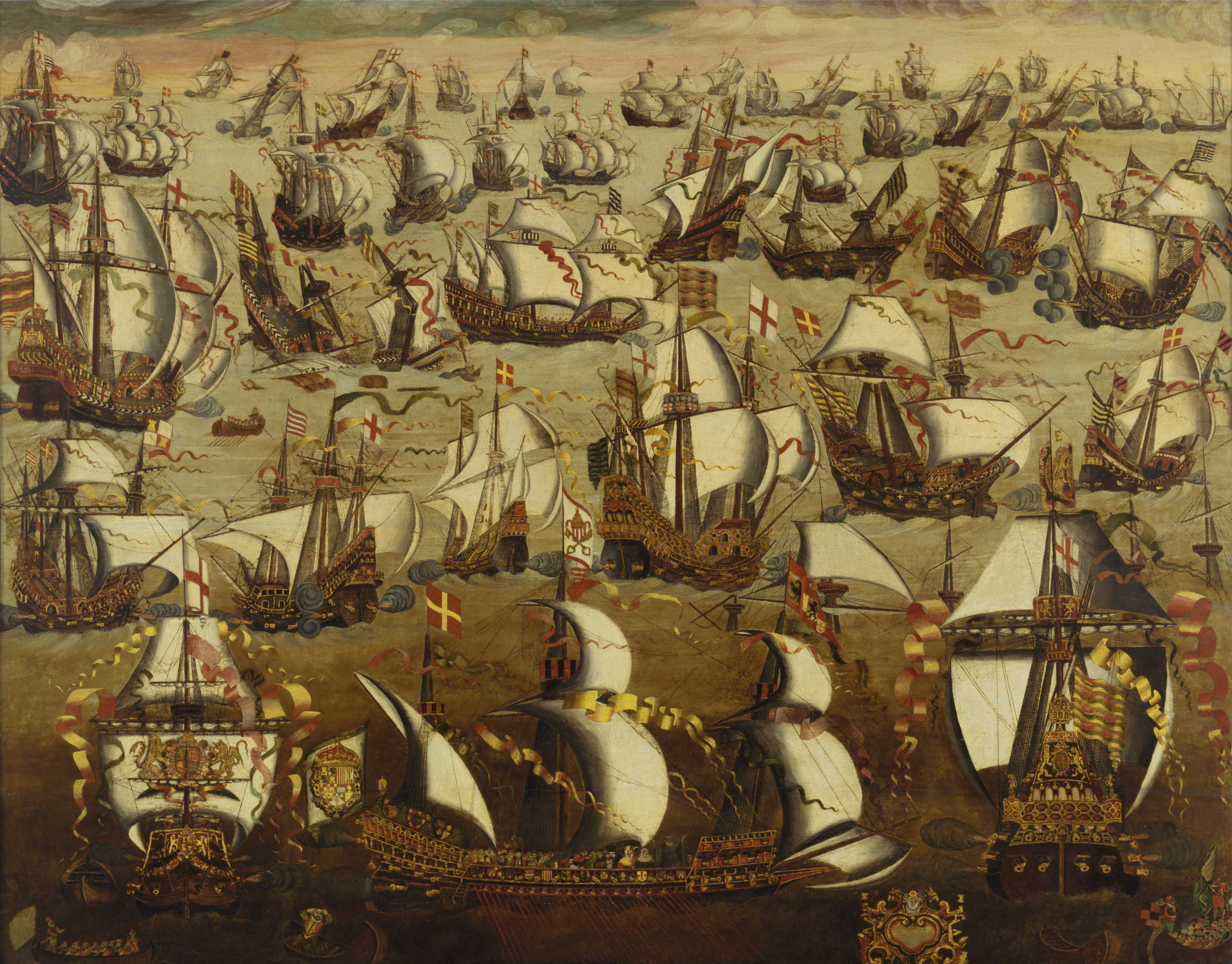
Battle between the naval fleets of Philip II of Habsburg (nicknamed the "Invincible Armada") and Elizabeth I of England in 1588, leaving the English victorious

With his private crusade against the Lutherans, the Catholic monarch prevented the participation of the Kingdom of Galicia in the three most important revolutionary processes of the age: the Reformation, the opening up of the New World, and the Scientific Revolution. In 1562, Philip II deployed the Holy Office, via the Spanish Inquisition, in the Kingdom of Galicia, after the failure of Charles V's attempts to do so due to the opposition of the Galician clergy.

The Inquisition was an instrument of cultural and religious repression without precedent, which began operating in Portugal from 1575, led by the Castilian Inquisitor Quijano del Mercado. The Inquisition's stated aim was to prevent the "contamination" of the Kingdom of Galicia by the reformist ideas of the Lutherans, which arrived in Galicia via English, Dutch and French traders. This situation also had serious commercial consequences, as merchant ships could not dock without the Inquisition's approval, and sailors believed to be heretics could be burned at the stake. The Inquisition even went as far as proposing the closure of all Galician seaports to avoid religious contamination. Such measures eventually exceeded the patience of the inhabitants of cities like A Coruña, which requested the end of inquisitorial activity at the seaport in 1589 due to the effect on maritime traffic.

"Rodrigo Montero, cleric, priest and rector of the Fort of San Felipe ... declared that ... the armies of the King our Lord (Philip II), have stayed here in winter and summer in the seaport town of Ferrol ... have done great harms to the residents of the town of Ferrol ... as they (the Spanish troops) took the houses where Ferrol people lived and the troops forced them to leave it and look for others ... troops have removed and cut the vines and breaking civilian's walls ... also razed and felled the forests and wood in people's forests ... took by force the boats to the inhabitants of the said town of Ferrol and the troops forced them to recruit and work for them without payment ... these services didn't allow the Ferrol's men go fishing and feed their wives and children and ... the troops also ate and destroyed the fruits of their trees and cabbages, vegetables and turnips and more lelgumbres of their orchards ... stole them also wood tabals from the civilians houses got repairing their vessels and the benefit of the said vessels ... |- (Rodrigo Montero, September 2, 1603)

Philip II's reign saw the continuation of the expulsion of the Jews begun on May 30, 1492, linguistic persecution (from 1566 the adoption of Castilian was enforced, and the use of Arabic was punished by the Crown), and religious persecutions effectively constituted ethnic cleansing. For example, in Alpujarra in the Kingdom of Granada in 1568, led by self-proclaimed king Muhammad ibn Umayya, Philip ordered the forced dispersal of 80,000 Granadian Muslims throughout the realm, and the introduction of Christians in their place. Thousands of Galician families were sent to Granada for that purpose between the years 1572–77, with a number of them dying in the process.

Although Spain generally militarized in order to conduct its war against the Netherlands—used primarily to garner support for the Crown—Galicia was left relatively undefended, a result of the prior dismantling of the Galician strongholds. Thus, in 1580 the Board of the Kingdom of Galicia requested troops from Philip in order to defend the coast, just months after a recruitment drive had taken place. However, although Phillip assented, these troops were not used to protect Galicia, but instead to attack Portugal, in an attempt to add it to Phillip's empire.

Despite claims to the contrary, the military campaign against Portugal was not carried out by professional soldiers billeted at A Coruña, Ferrol, or Baiona, and was not paid for by the crown, but was rather conducted by ill-equipped peasant troops, and paid for by Galician nobles such as Pedro Fernandes de Castro II, the Count of Monterrei, Gaspar de Zúñiga e Azevedo, and others. The war against England (1585–1604), motivated by the traditional English support of Portugal and Holland, also had disastrous consequences for the Kingdom of Galicia. This was due to both the disruption of trade relations with northern Europe, which since the Middle Ages had provided enormous wealth to the kingdom, and to England's constant operations in the region, staged in order to end Phillip's maritime expeditions, such as the Spanish Armada in 1588.

The outcome of all this was the complete ruin of Galician villages such as Ferrol, where the civilians were driven from their homes by Philip's soldiers, who seized all their crops and property, and drove the fishermen into forced labor. Towns like A Coruña also suffered constant attacks by the English fleet, such as that led by Francis Drake in 1589, with the cities being protected by civilian troops and folk heroes, such as María Pita.

=== The last Habsburgs (1598–1700) ===
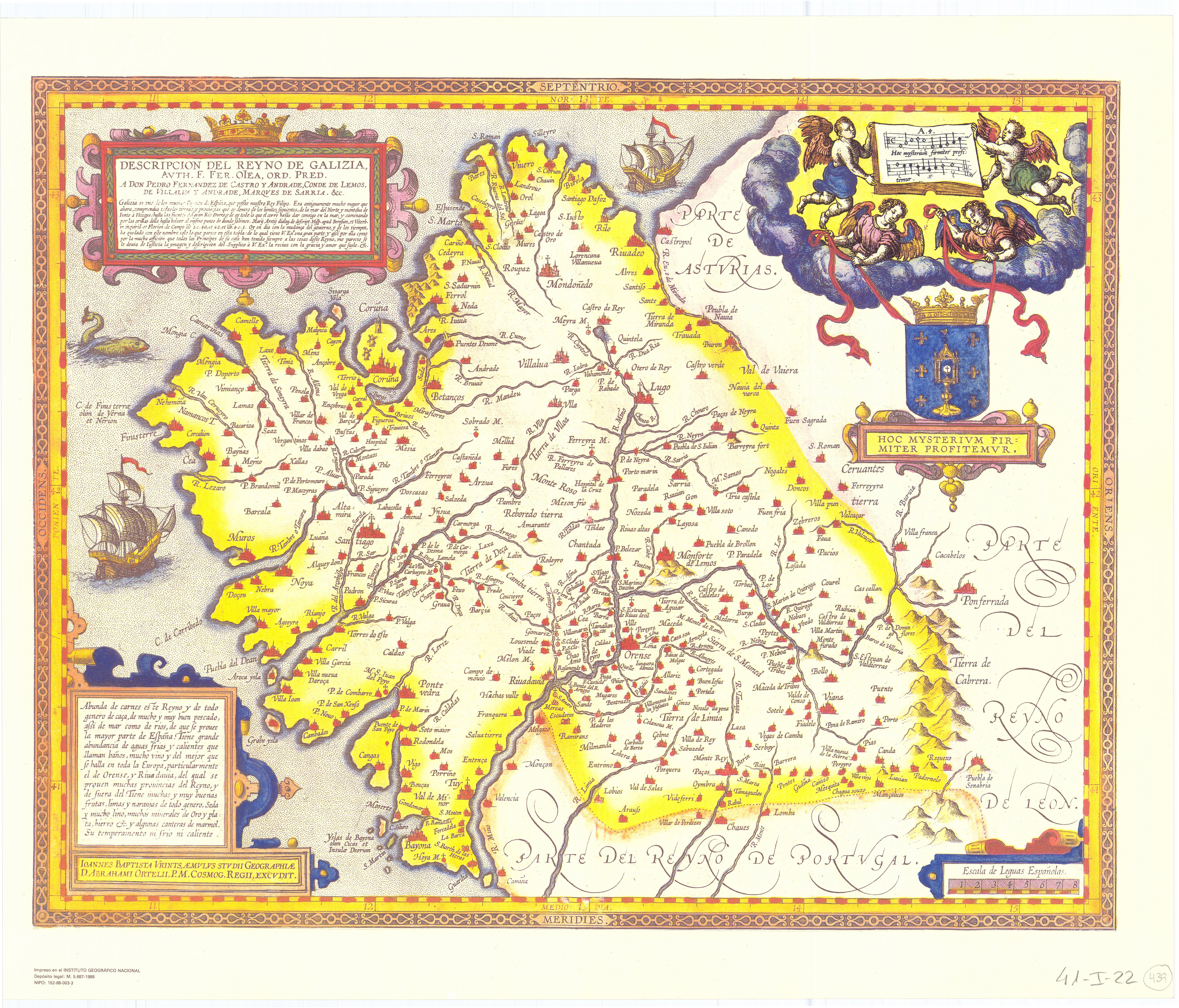
The Kingdom of Galicia in 1603

The death of Philip II in 1598 failed to effect a dramatic improvement in Galicia's fortunes. Although the reign of Philip III of Spain (1598–1621) was marked by a more conciliatory foreign policy and was more peaceful than that of his father, throughout the rest of the 17th century (viz., the reigns of Philip IV and Charles II) witnessed a series of wars between the Habsburgs and Holland, England, France and especially Portugal, which collectively had a remarkable social and economic impact in Galicia.

Thus, while conflicts against the Ottomans resulted in a devastating battle in the Rias Baixas in 1617, the unpopular war against Portugal (1640–1668) and the decades-long war against the Netherlands, both took a heavy toll on Galician peasants, sent to various fronts from the Atlantic seaports. Fray Felipe de la Gandara, official chronicler of the kingdom of Galicia, complained that during 25 years (1624–1659), "the kingdom of Galicia has served for now during the glorious reign of His Majesty [Philip IV] until the year 1659 with more than 68,000 men and 18,001,000 ducats".

The war also affected the Galician economy. Trade was paralysed, as Galicia's traditional commercial partners were now enemy powers: England, France, Flanders, and its main customer, Portugal, whose border had been closed for over three decades.

The provisions of the Spanish monarchs against trading timber in the kingdom also deepened the crisis. With the imposition a new (and controversial) administrative figure, the juez de plantíos y dehesas ("judge of forests and plantings"), the Castilian Council reclaimed its rights to the Galician forests for the construction of warships. This led to the perverse situation of locals being arrested for collecting firewood to heat their houses, leading in turn to resentment against the Galician junta.

=== Restoration of voting at the Council of Castile (1623) ===
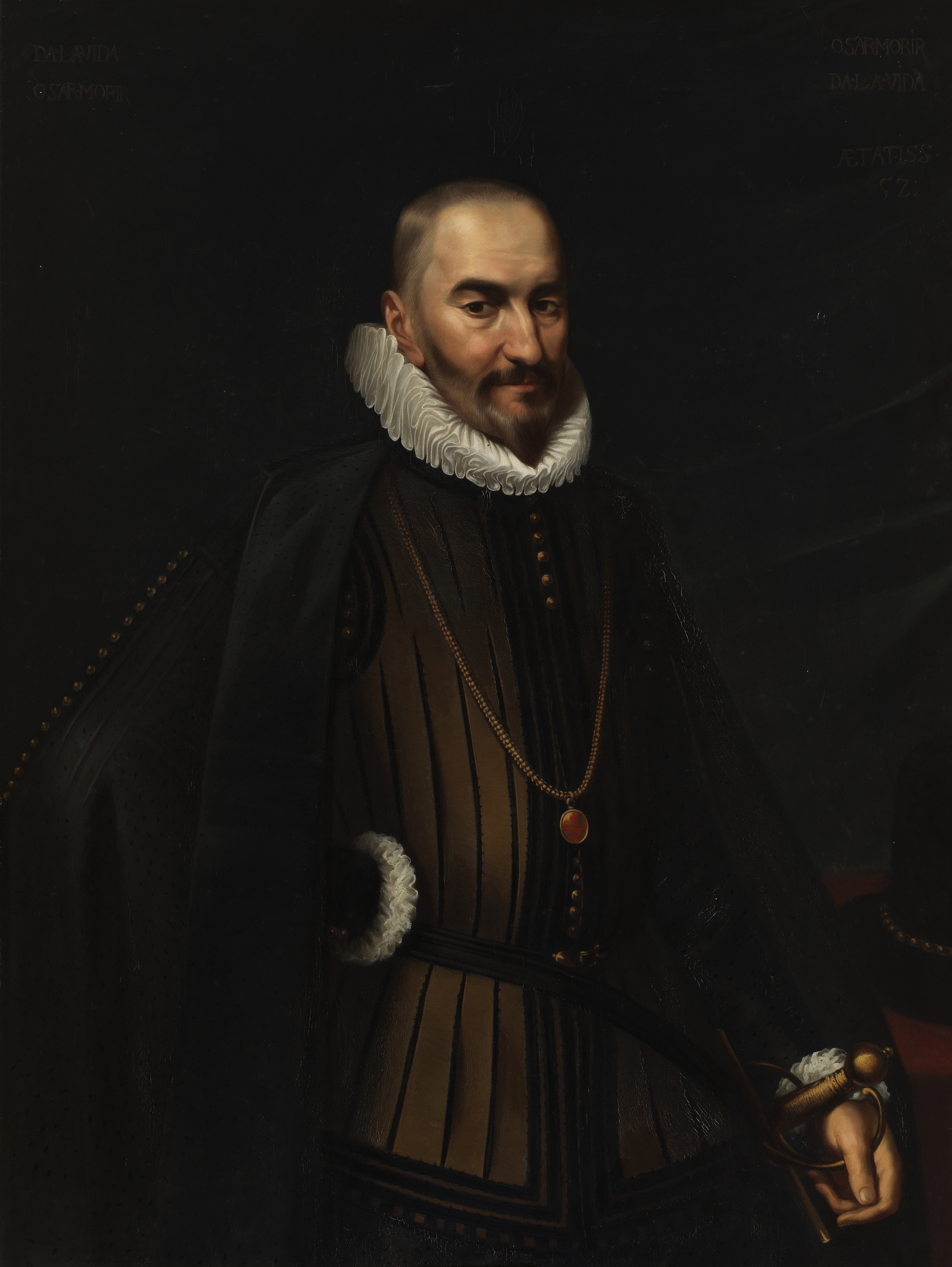
Diego Sarmiento de Acuña, count of Gondomar, was one of the main advocates of voting rights at the Council of Castile. A humanist ambassador and lover of the Galician language and culture, he was respected and appreciated in the kingdom and abroad; c. 17th century

Since the reign of King John II of Castile, the kingdom of Galicia was no longer on the Crown Council, and from about 1476 Zamora in León acted on behalf of Galicia in the assembly. However, in 1518 the Galician cities and towns began to demand their legitimate positions in the Council of Castile, and to protest the Zamoran leaders speaking for them.

The recovery of their voting rights at the Council of Castile was a goal shared by the Galician aristocracy and oligarchs. In 1520 the Archbishop of Santiago, Afonso III da Fonseca, and the Counts of Benavente and Andrade complained about it during a celebration of the Castilian Council in the Galician capital, Compostela, but to no avail. These elites organized an assembly, headed by Alfonso and consisting of nobles and prelates, in the town of Melide in central Galicia on December 4, 1520. They sent a new demand to Emperor Charles V on the subject of the vote, but he again refused to give Galicia an independent voice.

Quando eu non tibera a obrigaçon que o mundo save pola nobreça que en Vmd coñeço o fijera A esos meus señores seus fillos de Vmd e primos meus ueyjo infinitas ueçes as mans e deus os faga en to do seus fillos de Vmd e de miña señora Dona Costança. A quens garde noso señor como eu seu criado desejo. Çamora, oje, sabado. Seu sobriño de Vmd. Don Juan de Lanços y de Andrade

Year 1598. Sent to Diego Sarmiento de Acuña, this letter is one of the few witnesses in Galician language during the 17th century.

A year after the emperor's refusal, the Galician city councils tried another tack, resulting in a 1557 proposal to offer 20,000 ducats in exchange for restoring Galicia's vote in the Castilian Council. This proposal was put to successive meetings of the Galician assembly, until in 1599 the assembly accepted it and agreed to take the lead on negotiations. Two delegations were chosen to go to Madrid, but the new offer was rejected like the rest.

However, in 1621, circumstances turned in favor of Galicia. The Empire needed the political and financial cooperation of its kingdoms in order to wage another war, following the end of a twelve-year truce. The oligarchy and the Galician city councils were able to seize this opportunity, and, despite the resistance of Zamora and other cities with exclusionary voting at the Courts, the Crown bowed to military necessity, and in 1623 the kingdom of Galicia regained its Council vote, dependent upon paying 100,000 ducats to build a navy to defend its own coastline. The influence of Diego Sarmiento de Acuña, Count Gondomar, was crucial to the success of this effort, and Philip IV signed the resolution on October 13, 1623.

=== Charles II of Spain ===
In 1686 Charles II of Spain broke the custom of appointing the archbishops of Santiago as governors of the Kingdom of Galicia in case of substitution or interim, and being Bishop of the Diocese of Ourense, Don Diego Ros de Medrano was appointed Governor Captain General of the Kingdom of Galicia (October 9, 1686) replacing the Duke of Uceda, who had been given permission to move to the Court.

=== The establishment of the Bourbons (18th century) ===
In 1700, Charles II of Habsburg died without an heir. This caused a war between those who supported the French Philip V of Bourbon as the successor (mainly the crown of Castile and France) and those who supported the Austrian Archduke Charles VI of Habsburg (the Crown of Aragon, England and Holland among others). In fact the struggle between these two suitors was also basically a struggle between two political conceptions: on the one hand the absolutist centralism of Philip V, and on the other the federalism of Charles VI of Habsburg. In the ensuing war (1701–1714) between the crown of Castile and the Crown of Aragon, the kingdom of Galicia could not avail itself of an independent policy due to being controlled strongly since 1486 by Castile, and Galicia was forced to provide military support to the suitor supported by the Castilian Crown, Philip V of Bourbon, who eventually won the war.

The political result of this war was the establishment of a monarchy based in Castile, from where it attempted to impose uniform governance on the region. The culmination of this policy was the "Nueva Planta Decrees" (1707–1716), designed to punish the Crown of Aragon by eliminating its political bodies and imposing an Audiencia similar to that in Galicia 200 years before. Once the old crowns -Castile and Aragon- were dissolved in 1715, the "Crown of Spain", governed solely by the Castilian government—notably by the Council of Castile—replaced them. In addition, the Bourbons established a "provincial Intendance" on their territories according to the French model, including the kingdom of Galicia, under the command of a General Captain.

There was also a firm Bourbon policy aimed at standardizing culture and language within their Spanish territories. Explicit and stringent laws were designed to end linguistic diversity in Bourbon territories with non-Castilian native languages:

Finally, I command that the teaching of the first letters, Latin and rhetoric will only in Castilian language, taking care this compliance the Audiencias and the respective Courts. May 23, 1768. Charles III of Bourbon.

=== The Enlightenment (1746–1788) ===
Not a few times I thought which was the reason why in Galicia has introduced the use or abuse of writing in Castilian, ... who have introduced it? ... Not the Galicians, but the Foreigners (Castilians) who in the early 16th century flooded the Kingdom of Galicia, not to cultivate their lands, but to eat the best flesh and blood, and to receive the best jobs, such as ecclesiastical as civil, they have been, not knowing the Galician language, nor by word or in writing, have introduced the monstrosity of writing in Castilian, for a people that speaks just the pure Galician.

Year 1762. "Obra de los 660 Pliegos". Martín Sarmiento.

The Age of Enlightenment arose during the 18th century in Europe, representing new interests in empirical ideas, in philosophy, political economy, and sciences such as physics, chemistry, and biology. Thus began a renewal of interest in the historical personality, as well as the cultural and economic diversity, of the Kingdom of Galicia, attributable to important local writers who knew Galicia as a distinct polity with particular needs.

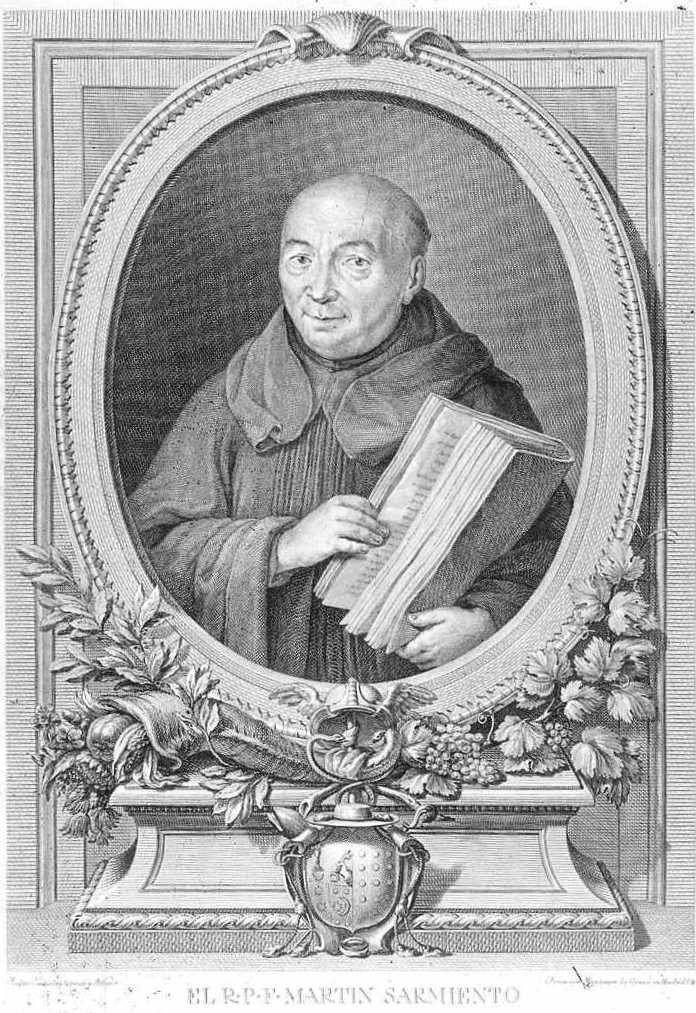
Portrait of Martín Sarmiento

In the vast task of modernizing the kingdom to best leverage its human and natural resources, Galician societies and academies played a prominent role, such as the Academy of Agriculture of the Kingdom of Galicia (inaugurated on January 20, 1765), The Economic Society of Friends of the Kingdom of Galicia (February 15, 1784), and the Societies of Friends of the Country to Santiago de Compostela (1784) and Lugo (1785), as well as ambitious proposals such as the Royal Fishermen's Pawnshop of the Kingdom of Galicia (1775).

The Enlightenment writers were the first to denounce the Kingdom's contemporary problems, most of them arising from the harmful policies of the Catholic Monarchs and the Habsburgs. These writers began reporting on the state of roads, the unnecessary imports, the mass emigration, the linguistic acculturation polities, and the economic marginalization of the kingdom. Due to their demands, they achieved, inter alia, the constitution of a Maritime and Land Consulate in A Coruña, allowing Galicia to trade with the American colonies.

Two ecclesiastics, Benito Jerónimo Feijóo y Montenegro and Martín Sarmiento, stood out for their enormous contributions to the language and culture of the kingdom. Montenegro was the first to denounce the misery of the Galician peasants, proposing changes in the administration of the kingdom. Sarmiento, with extensive knowledge of botany and natural medicines, devoted himself to philology; and was a great defender of the Galician language, composing the Catalogue of voices and phrases of the Galician language (1745–1755). Economic themes were highlighted by other Galician aristocrats, such as Joseph Cornide Saavedra, Pedro Antonio Sánchez, and Lucas Labrada, as well as ecclesiastics like Francisco de Castro, and merchants like Antonio Raimundo Ibáñez. They were all authors of multiple works of importance to economic development, such as the Report on sardine fishing off the coast of Galicia (1774), and the Economic description of the Kingdom of Galicia (1804).

=== 19th century ===
The Kingdom of Galicia and the Junta continued to formally exist until the State Liberal Reform of 1833, at the time of the provincial division under the regency of Maria Christina of the Two Sicilies. Galicia regained its territorial unity for twenty-four days by the constitution of the Junta de Gobierno de Galicia following a liberal armed uprising in 1846, the Mártires de Carral, but never regained the status of a kingdom.

== Culture ==
Due to myths surrounding Galicia's history (especially during the era of the kingdom), the Kingdom has been referred to as "Terra Meiga" (land of the witches) or "Reino Meiga" (kingdom of the witches).

== Symbols of the kingdom ==
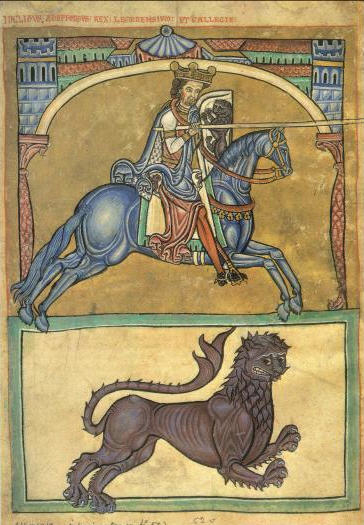
Romanesque miniature representing Alfonso IX, King of León. In the upper part appears his historic title Rex Legionensium et Gallecie, while the lower part shows the purple lion, symbol of the Leonese monarchy

=== The purple lion ===
The custom of painting symbols, such as the heraldic shields of war, was forged in the battlefields of Europe after the middle decades of the 12th century, due to a confluence of different circumstances. One was the need to differentiate between allies and adversaries on the battlefield, as facial protection in medieval helmets tended to obscure the combatants' faces, but also due to the high ornamental value of decorated shields with bright, crisp, and alternate shapes in the context of chivalrous society.

The first heraldic signs were used by kings as personal marks to identify themselves. Shortly after, they began to be shared by the upper social levels close to the royalty, and finally were used to represent the territory in which they exercised their jurisdiction, the kingdom.

One of the first kings in Europe to make use of a heraldic emblem was the Leonese king, Alphonse VII. At the beginning of the 12th century he began timidly using a purple lion in accordance with its ancient symbolism, as Leo Fortis, the "strong lion", symbolized power and primacy of the monarch, but would also have represented a punning reference to the name of his kingdom, León. The emblem was developed with his son Ferdinand II, and was finally established by Alphonse IX.

=== The Chalice, symbol of the kingdom ===
Parallel to the process of development and consolidation of European royal emblems from the late 13th century, collections of them, the Armorials, displayed lists of kingdoms and their royal symbols. In the case of Galicia, the prominence which the Kingdom had had for centuries saw it included in the early European armorials. However, the absence of an exclusive symbol for Galician kings, who were also kings of León since the 12th century, forced the medieval heraldists to use Canting arms, a symbol derived from the phonetics of the name.

An English armorial named Segar's Roll, produced in 1282, was the first Armorial which assigned the chalice as the Coat of Arms for the King and Kingdom of Galicia (Roy de Galice), probably coming directly from the Anglo-Norman word for Galicia, Galyce, which was close to the word Calice (chalice). Following that time, different European armorials began to use the chalice as the emblem of the Kingdom of Galicia. In the mid-15th century, this symbol came to Galicia, where it was easily and readily accepted, as the Holy Grail was already a symbol widely spread over Europe and already present in Galician history and its deepest beliefs.

Thereafter, the purple lion of the former Galician-Leonese monarchy lost its representative character in favor of the better known canting arms, being then adopted exclusively by the Kingdom of León, whilst in Galicia the chalice would develop into the modern coat-of-arms of Galicia.

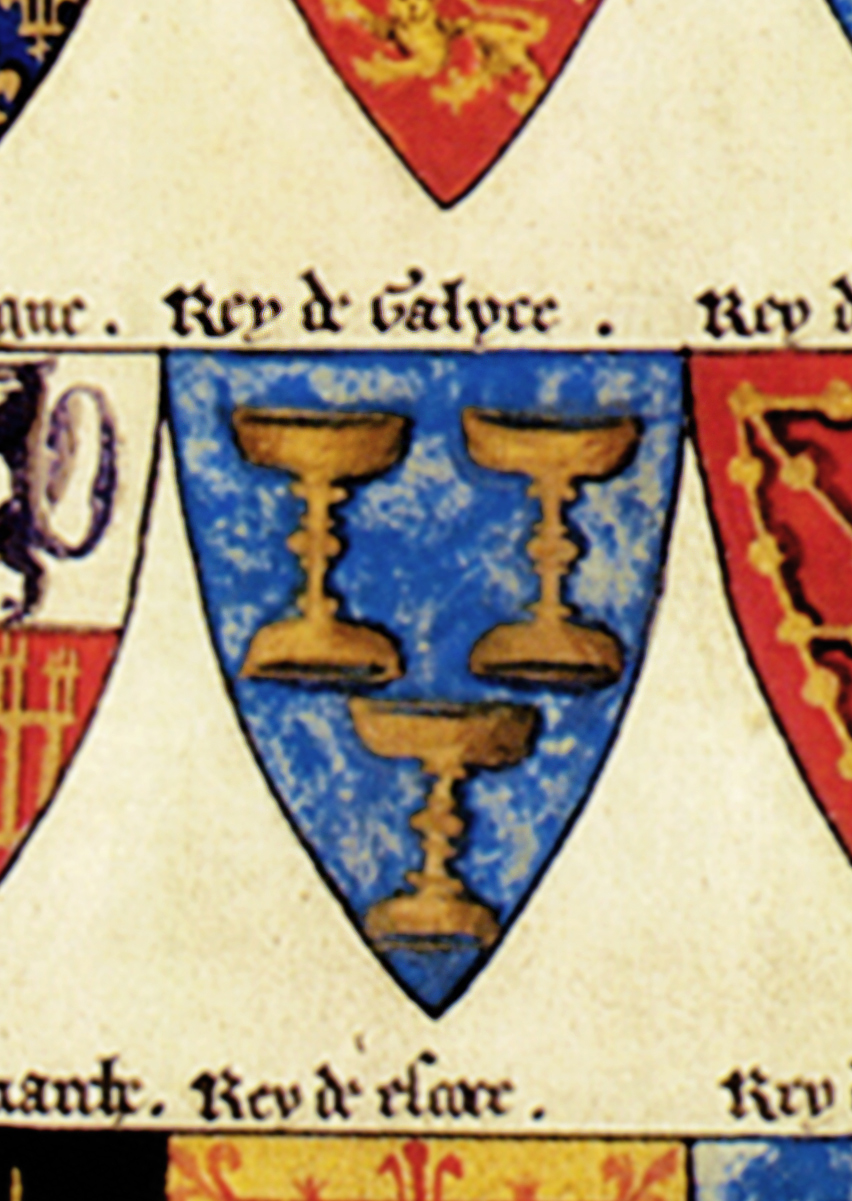
Arms of the Kings of Galicia, Segar's Roll, 13th century

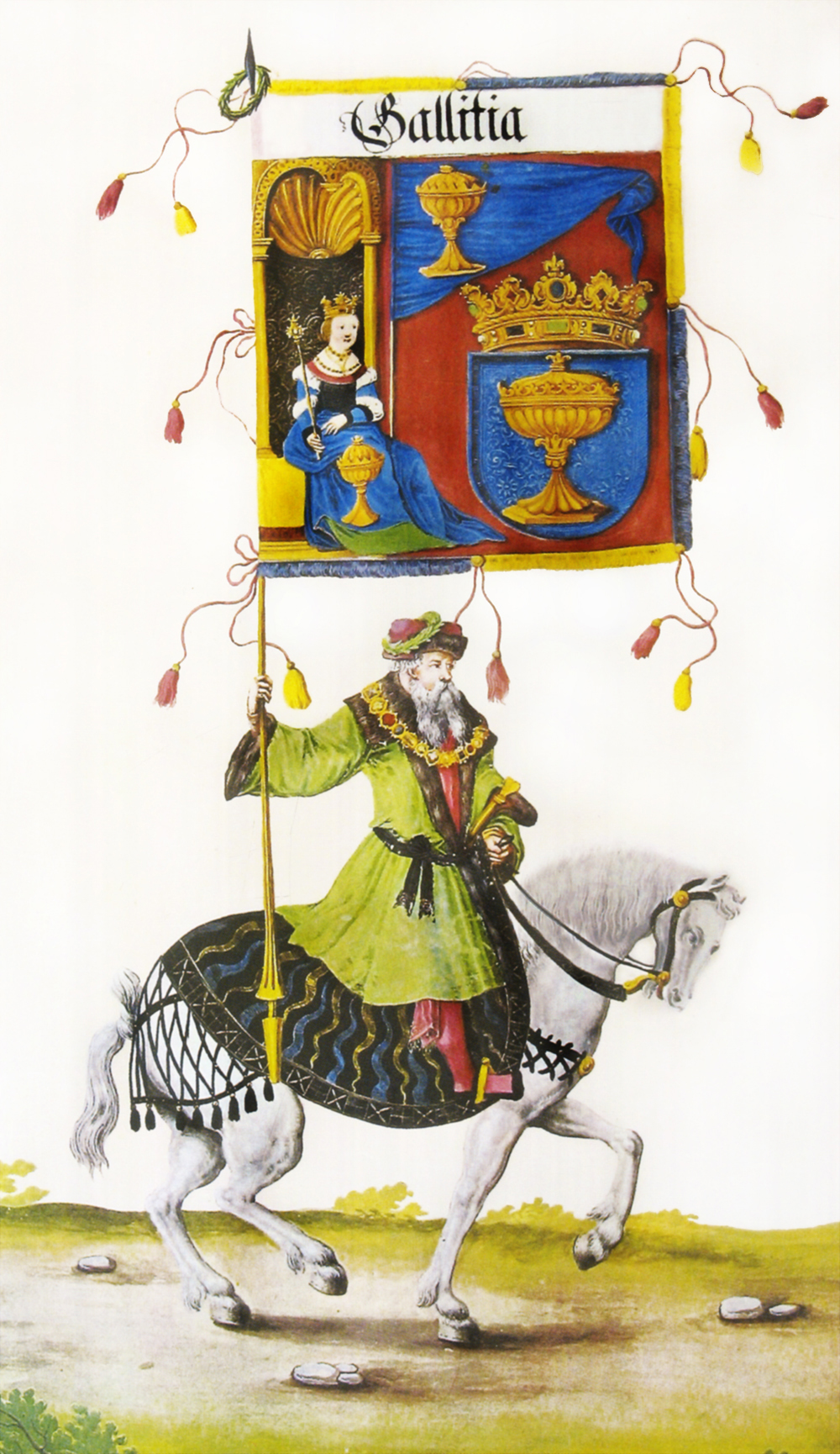
Arms of the kingdom of Galicia in the "Great Triumphal Chariot of Maximilian", Year 1515.

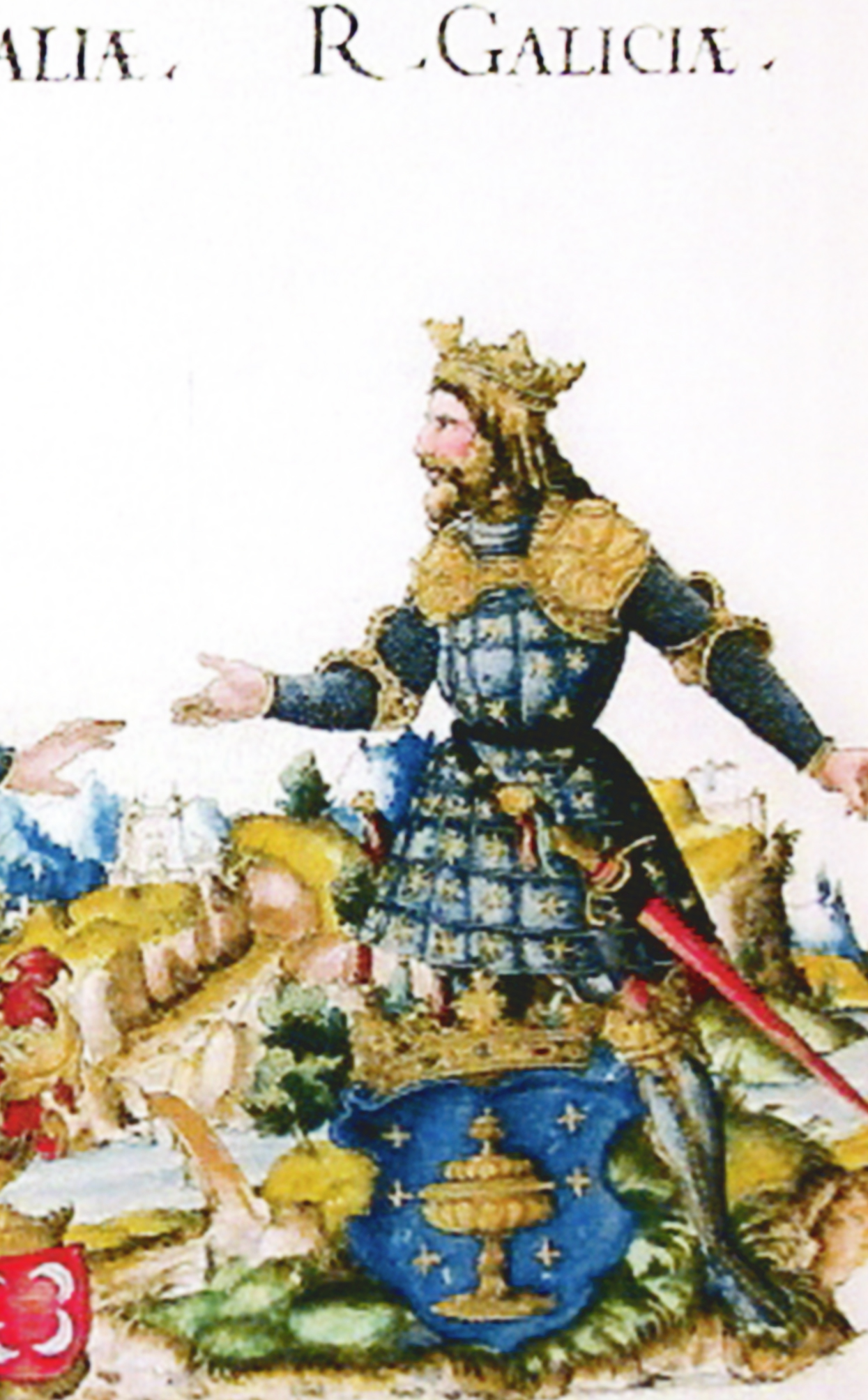
Arms of the kingdom of Galicia in the Historia originis et succesionis regnorum et imperiorum a Noe usque ad Carolum V, 1548.

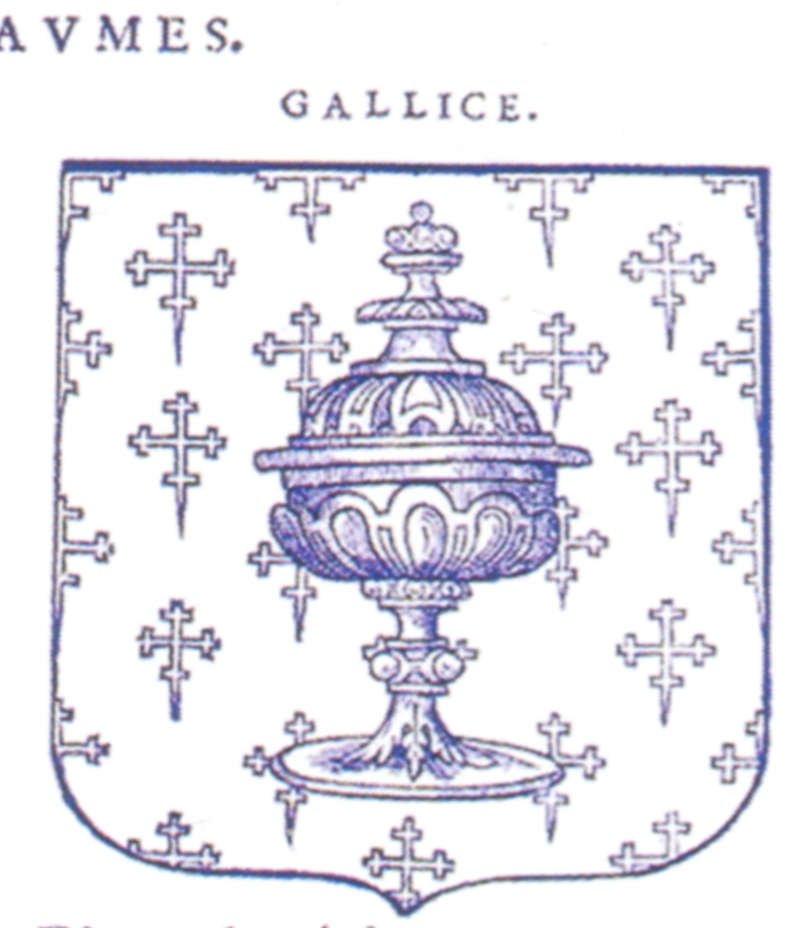
Arms of the kingdom od Galicia, Le blason des Armoiries, Year 1581

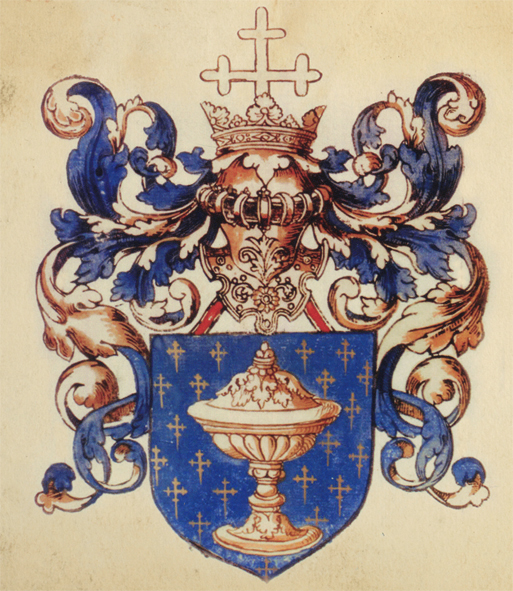
Arms of the Kingdom of Galicia, illustrated in L´armorial Le Blancq, Bibliothèque nationale de France, 16th century

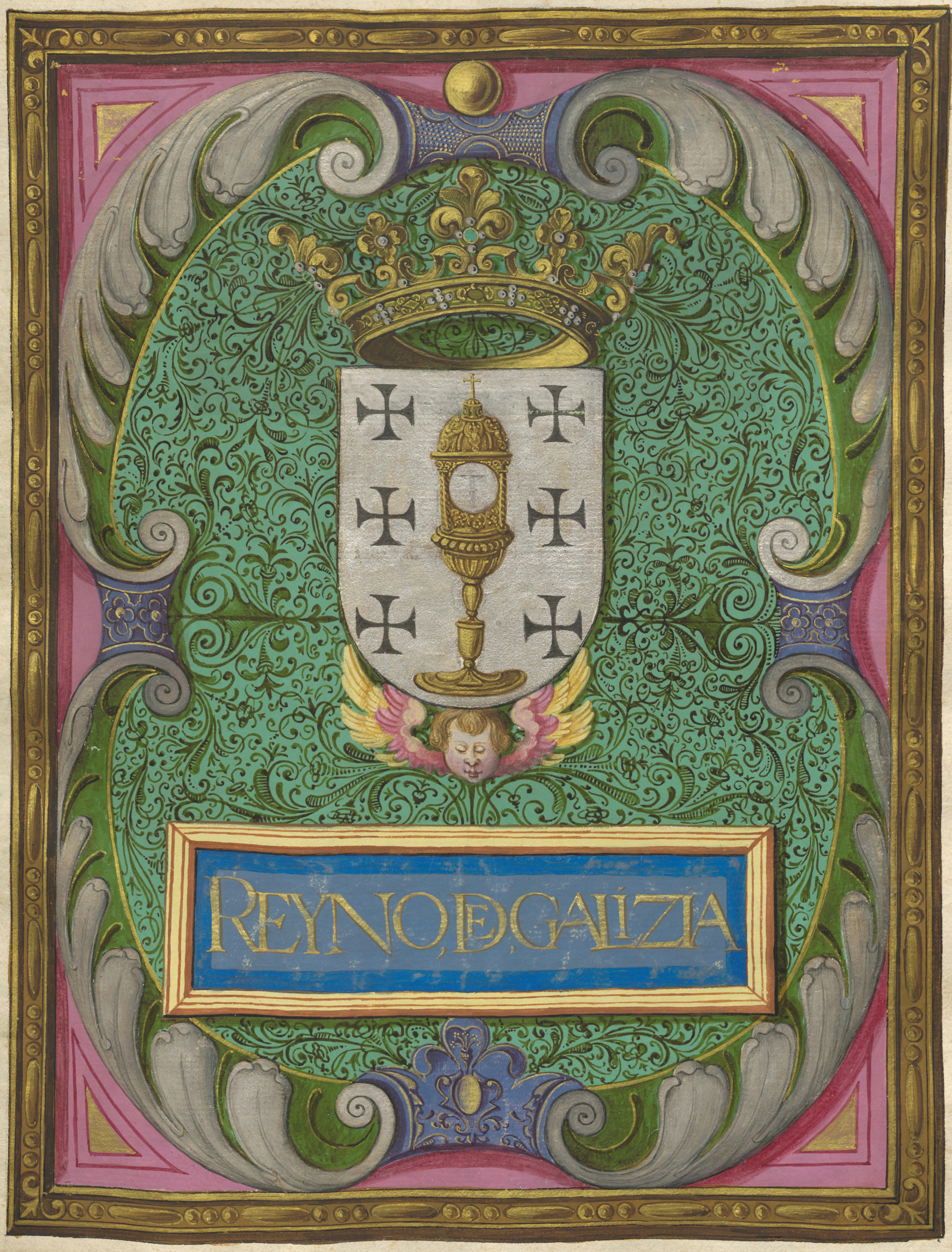
Arms of the Kingdom of Galicia, Pedro de Teixeira, 17th century

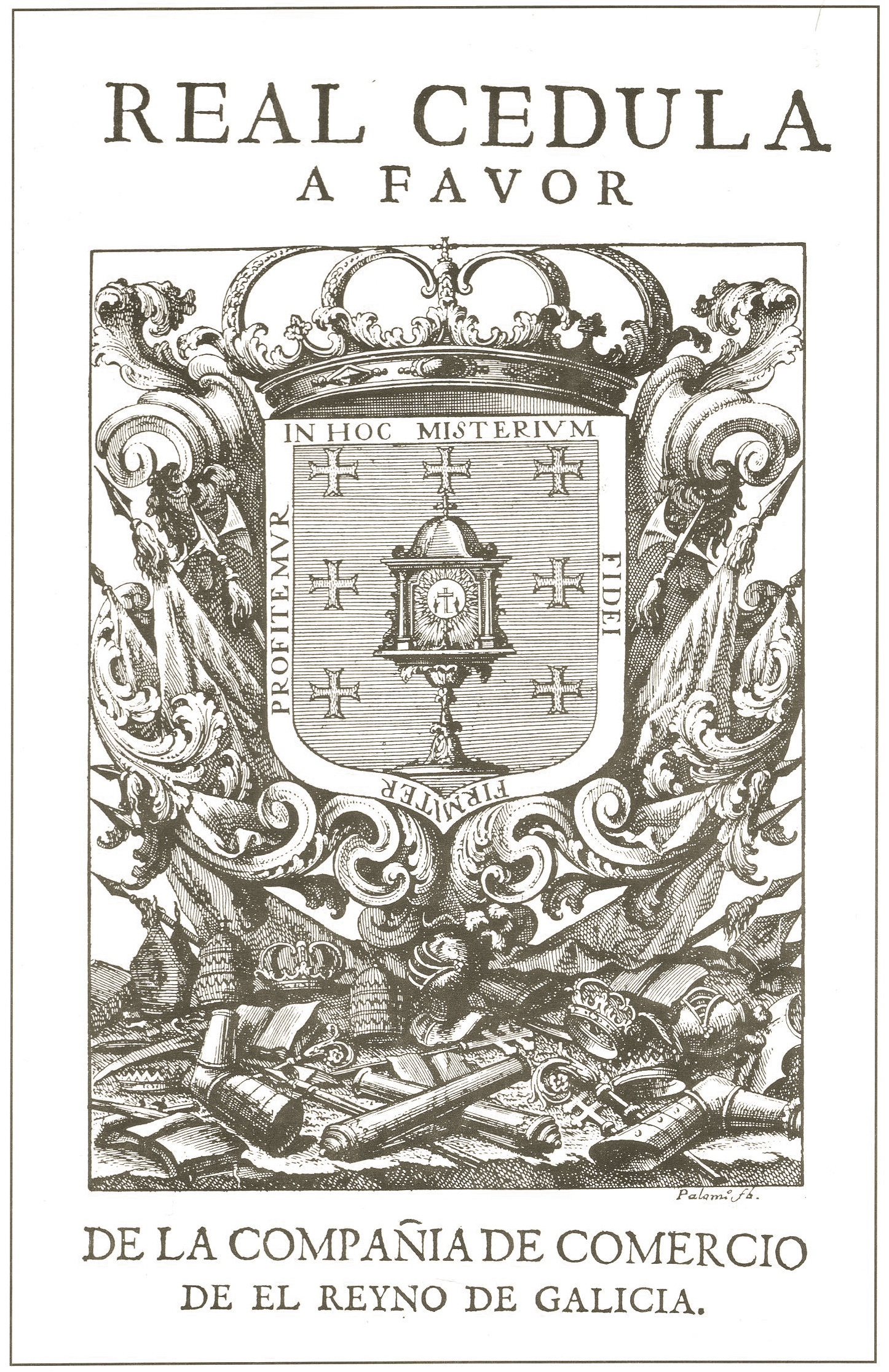
Comercial Company of the Kingdom of Galicia, 18th century

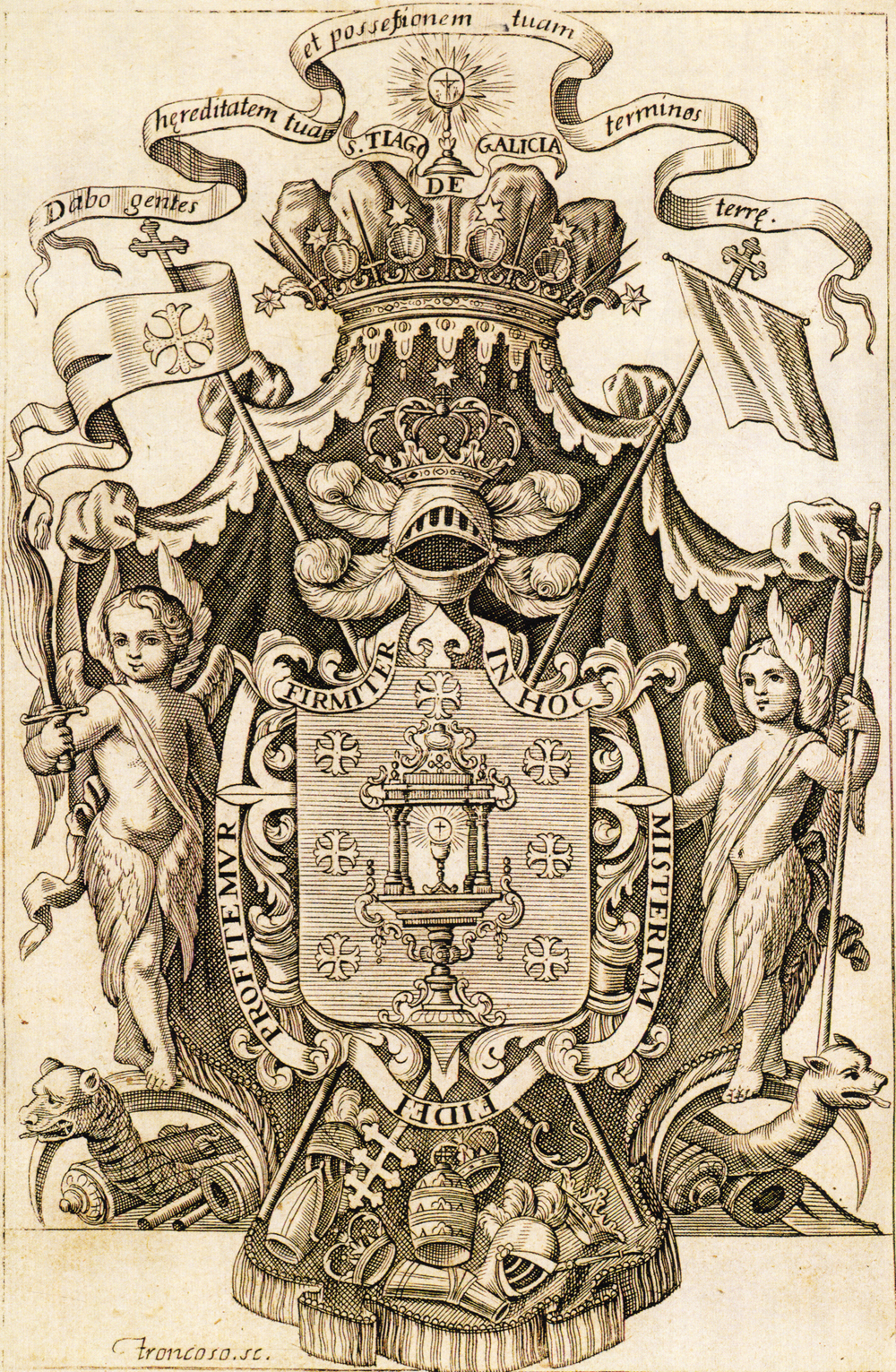
Arms of the kingdom of Galicia, Galicia.Reino de Christo Sacramentado y primogénita de la Iglesia entre las gentes, Year 1750.

Arms of Galicia, today

== Medieval cartography ==
The Kingdom of Galicia in medieval cartography

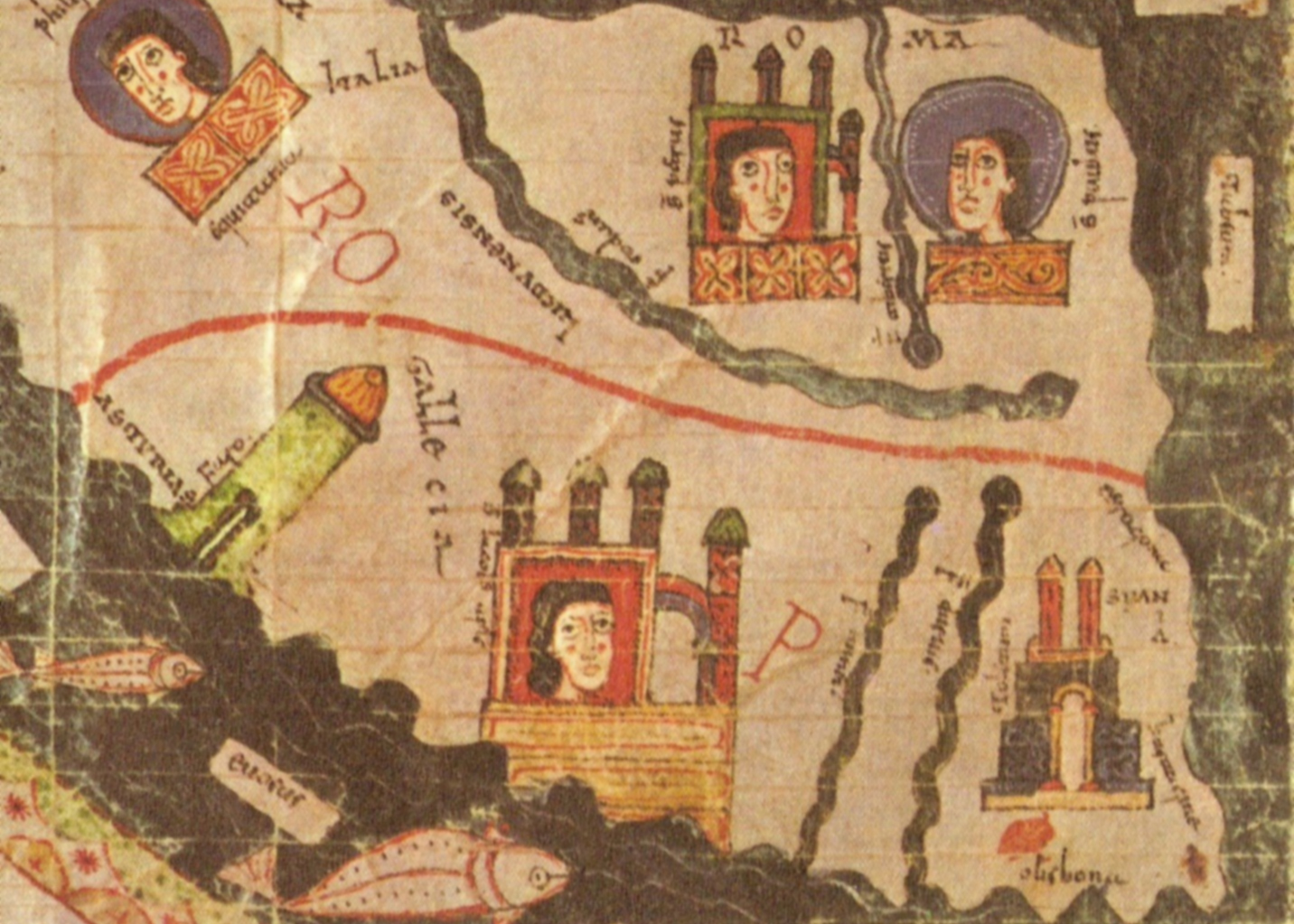
Burgo de Osma´s map (1086), with the names Gallecia (occupying the whole Northwest Iberian Peninsula), Asturias (occupying the Cantabrian linecoast), and Spania (occupying the rest of Iberia)

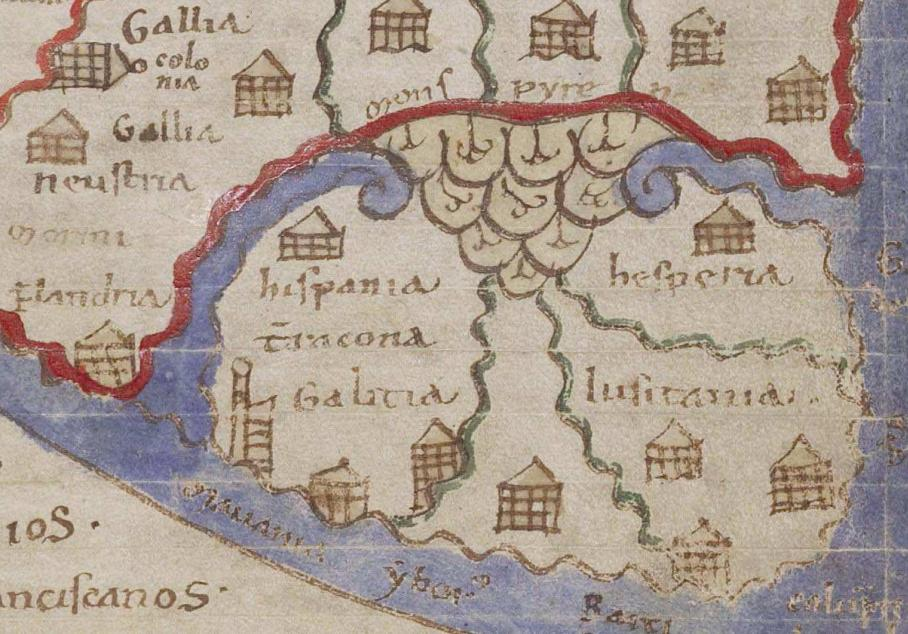
In Liber Floridus (1125), by Lambert of Saint-Omer, showing the names Galitia, Hispania, Lusitania, and Wasconia, among others

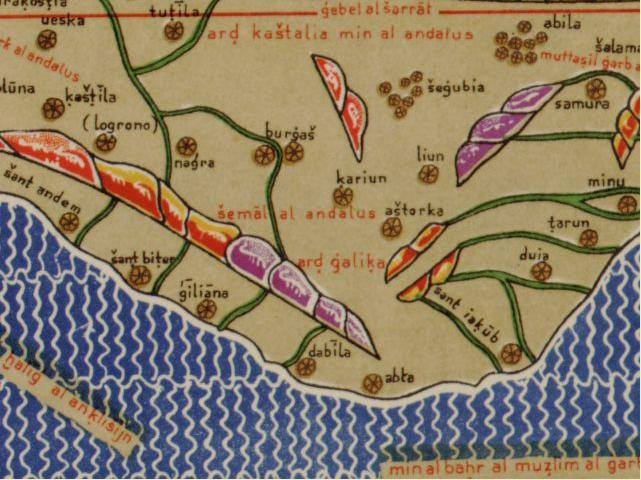
In Tabula Rogeriana (1154), by Muhammad al-Idrisi, showing the name Ard Galika

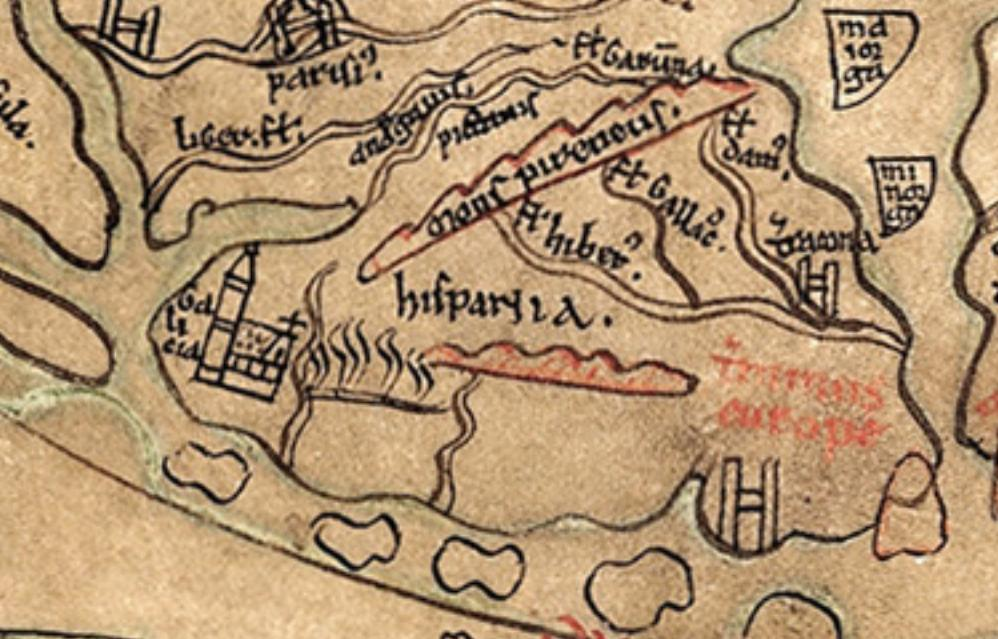
In Imago Mundi (1190), by Honorius Augustodunensis, showing the names Galicia and Hispania

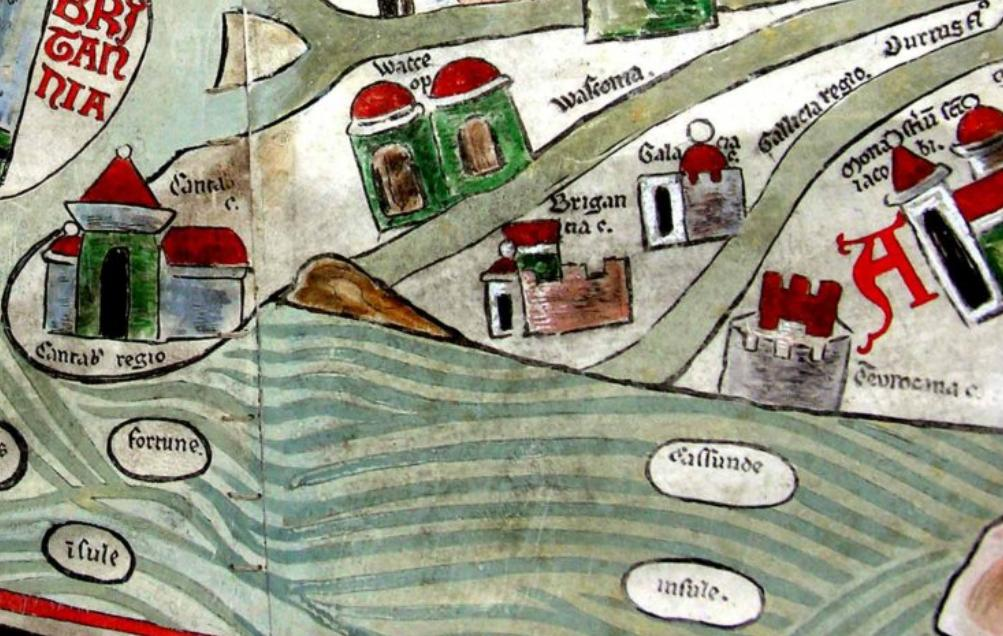
Ebstorf Map (1234), showing the name Gallicia Regio

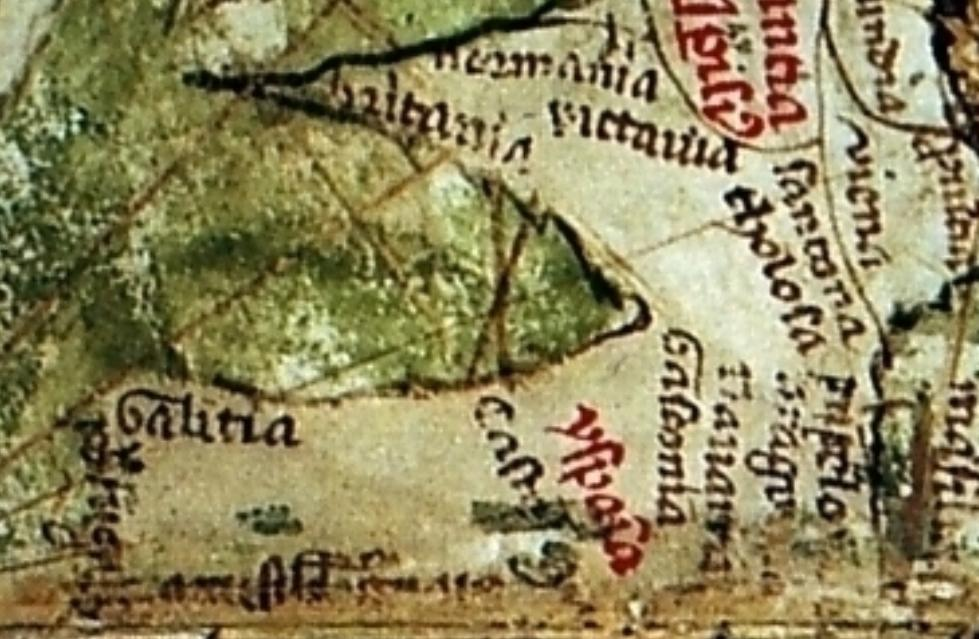
In Liber Secretorum (1125), by Marino Sanuto, where the name Galitia occupies the entire northwestern Iberia

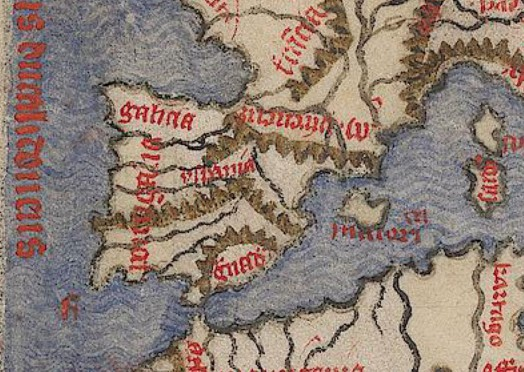
Pirrus de Noha's map (1414) where Galicia occupies the northwestern Iberia.

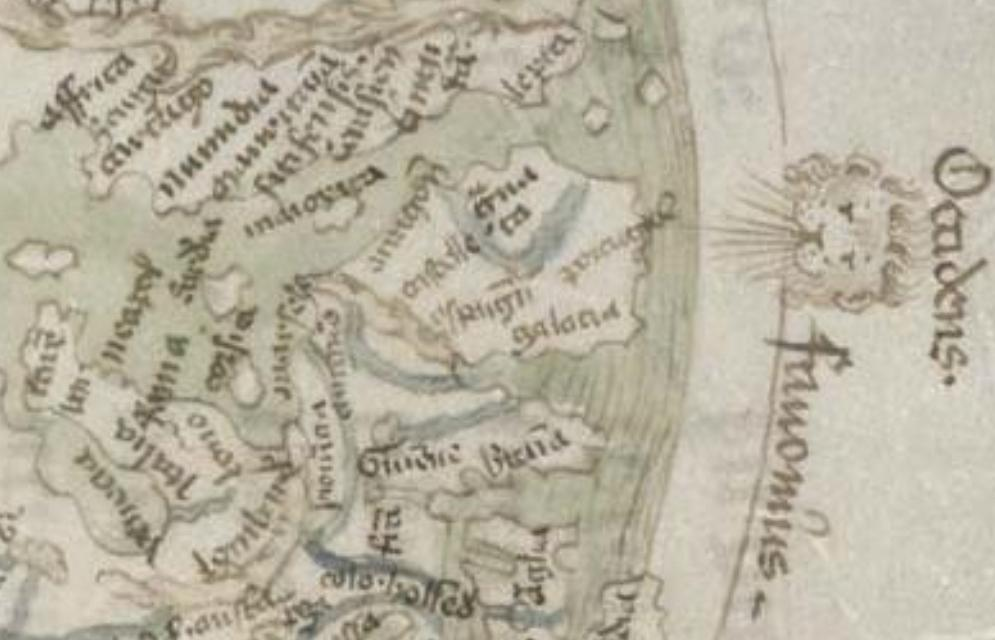
Sallust de Geneve's map (1420), where the name Galaecia occupies the entire northwestern Iberia

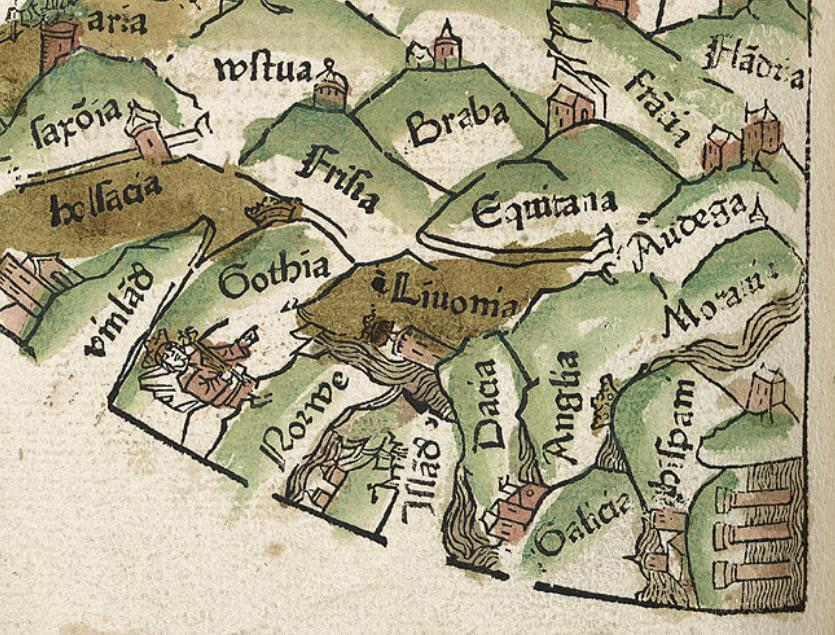
In Rudimentum Novitorum (1475), by Lucas Brandis, showing the names Galicia, Hispani, and Anglia, among others

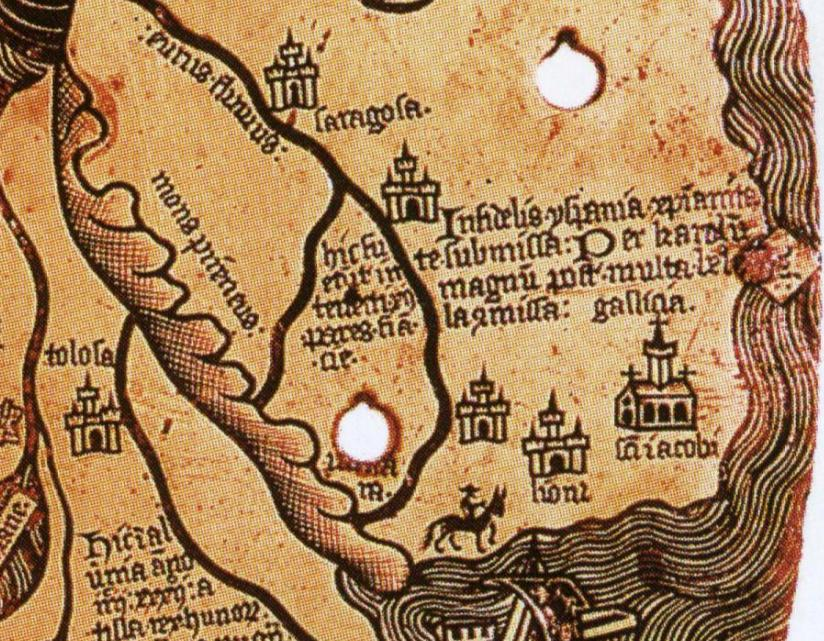
Northwest Iberian Peninsula (15th century) with the names Galiicia and nearby infidelis Yspania
