= Fernando de Acuña y de Herrera =

Fernando de Acuña y de Herrera (died 1495) was Viceroy of Sicily from 1489–1495.

== Family ==
Fernando was one of six siblings, a son of an originally Portuguese family, whose grandfather, Lope Vázquez de Acuña I had settled in Spain for political trouble reasons. His father was Pedro de Acuña y Carrillo de Albornoz, Sieur of Buendía and Azañól since 1397, the Sieur of Dueñas since 9 December 1439, promoted to Count of Buendía in 1475.

Fernando de Acuña y de Herrera Spanish grandmother Teresa, came from a significant Burgos family, named "Carrillo" and a still more powerful family from Cuenca named "de Albornoz". She was the Lady of Paredes, Portilla and Valtablado. All her brothers/sisters became quite powerful also, for instance, her brother Archbishop Alonso Carrillo de Albornoz, a.k.a. Alonso Carrillo de Acuña, (1410–1482), Bishop of Siguenza, Member of the Royal Council under king Juan II of Castile, Enrique IV of Castile and the Royal Couple Isabel I of Castile and Ferdinand II of Aragon, Archbishop of Toledo and one of the more troublesome and intrigant political animals of 15th-century Spanish politics.

Fernando's mother was Inés de Herrera y de Ayala, a daughter of Pedro García de Herrera, a Marshal of Castile, Sieur of Ampudia, related to Conquerors of the Canary Islands.
Fernando de Acuña married María Dávila, founding both the Monastery of "Las Gordillas" in Avila, there was no issue through this marriage.

Fernando's eldest brother, II Count of Buendía, was named however Lope Vázquez de Acuña II, 1st duke of Huete from 24 December 1474, a Knight of the Military Order of Santiago, who died on 1 January 1489, married Inés Enriquez de Quiñones, some of their descendants being crushed through their military interventions in 1521 against king Charles I of Spain, a.k.a. Holy Roman Emperor Charles V.

Fernando's and Lope sister Leonor de Acuña, deceased towards the end of 1501, married and got succession from Pedro Manrique de Lara, 2nd count of Paredes de Nava, the eldest brother of famous poet, no issue, Jorge Manrique, deceased in a feudal battle, April 1479. Both Leonor and eldest brother Lope, a Count and also a Duke, lived and enjoyed the magnificent castle of Segura de la Sierra, province of Jaen, now in the 2100 km^{2}. National Park of Cazorla, Segura y las Villas, as did the 1st and the 2nd Counts of Paredes de Nava, father Rodrigo and brother Pedro respectively of another Knight of the Military Order of Santiago, Spanish Poet Jorge Manrique, killed in a feudal fight on 24 April 1479.

== Governor and Viceroy ==
On 3 August 1480, Fernando de Acuña was appointed Chief Justice of Galicia, a title to which he was soon added that of Governor of Galicia. He was sent to Galicia with the objective of pacifying the Kingdom and subjecting it to the directives of the Crown. He was confronted with the uprising of Marshal Pedro Pardo de Cela in 1483.
Acuña tried Pardo in absentia, confiscated his property, and condemned him to death. When Pardo was captured by his own militia on 7 December 1483, Acuña had Pardo executed on the 17th of that same month, which caused profound unrest in the kingdom. The fear of the possible consolidation of a new anti-monarchist movement in Galicia, led the Crown to replace him as Governor, a position granted in March 1484 to Diego López de Haro.

Between 1489 and 1495 he was sent as a viceroy to the kingdom of Sicily, where he died, being buried in the cathedral of Catania. After Fernando's death, the next Viceroy was Aragonese Juan de Lanuza y Garabito between 1495 - 1498.
