= Fazaouro Formation =

Geologic formation in Spain

- Stratigraphic range: Early Miocene-Early Holocene
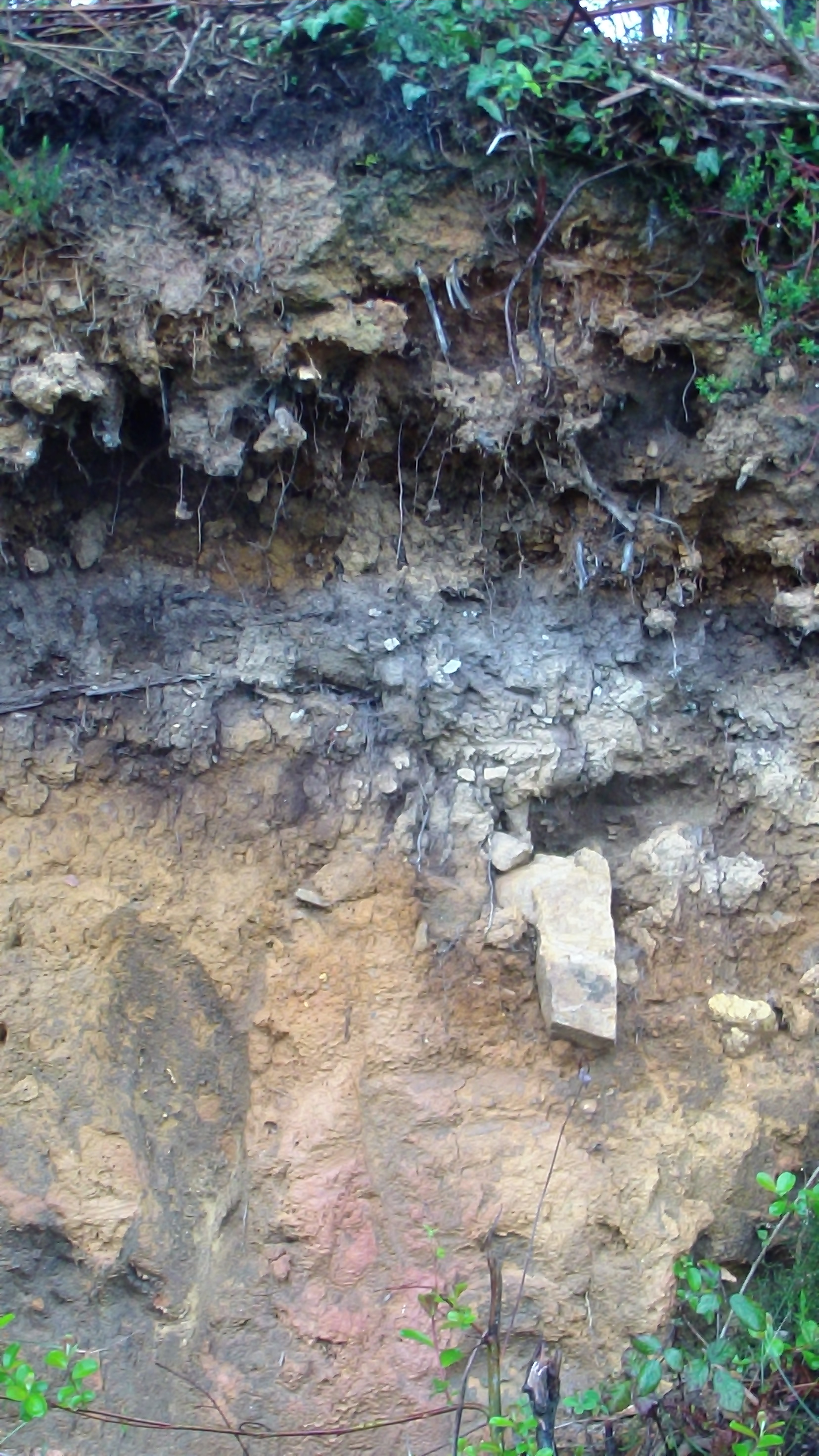
- Recent (Maybe Early Holocene) depositional sequence
- Type: Formation

Lithology
- Primary: Mica, shale, feldspar
- Other: Coal, plagioclase, biotite, muscovite

Location
- Location: Foz-Alfoz
- Coordinates: 43.55°N 7.40°W
- Region: Galicia
- Country: Spain
- Extent: >15–17 km^{2} (5.8–6.6 sq mi)

Type section
- Named for: Fazouro, unit inside the Foz locality
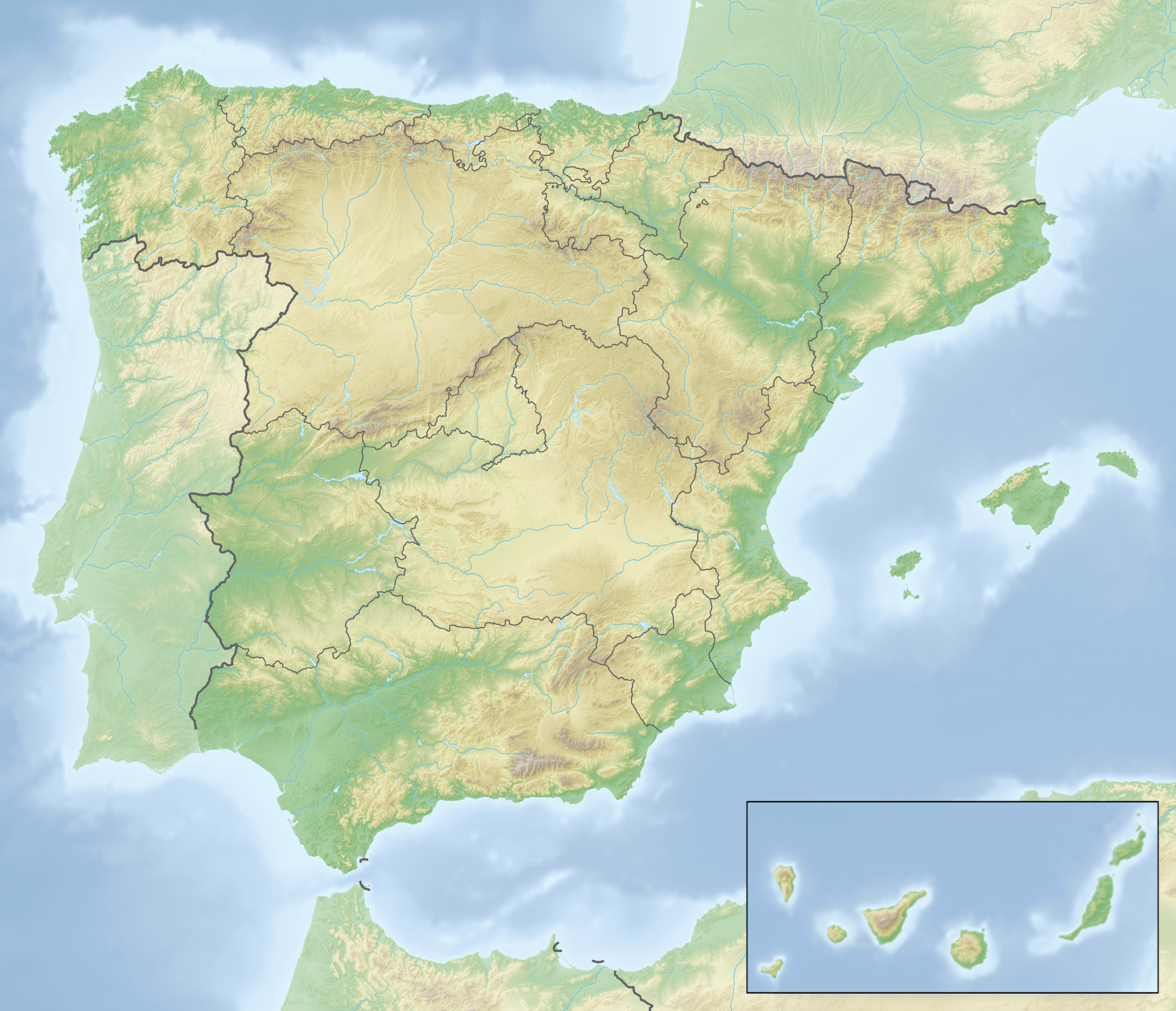
- Fazaouro Formation (Spain)

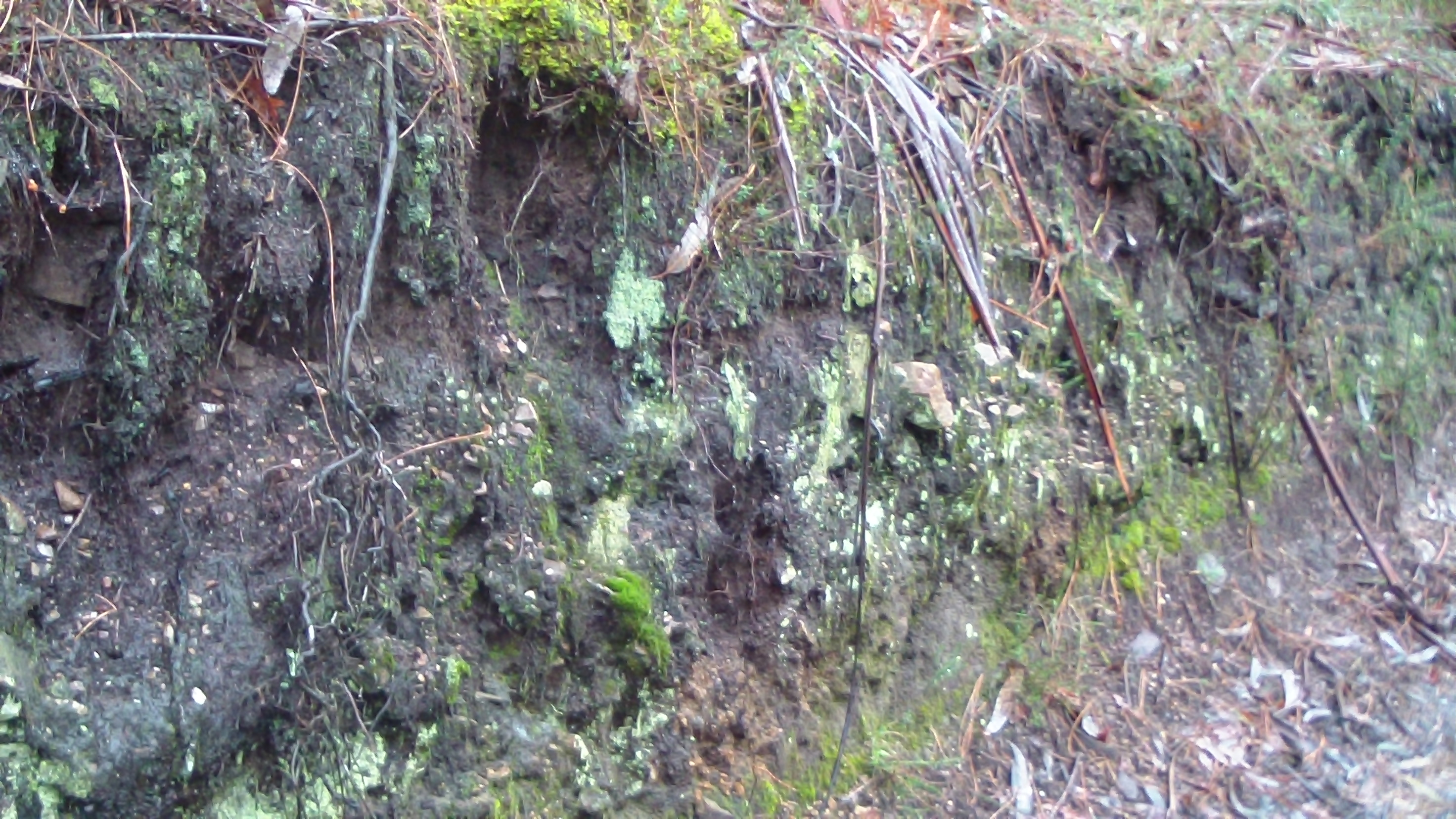
Exposed Recent layer of the so-called Fazaouro Formation, from Moucide, Valadouro, NE Galicia, Spain. The Formation Ranges Between Alfoz, Foz & Valadouro.

The Fazaouro Formation is a fluvial-lacustrine sedimentary fill in the northeast of the Province of Lugo, at the site of the prehistoric depositional ranges of a supposed sedimentary glaciation. The area consists of a valley and ridge topography, with a series of small mounts at roughly ninety degrees to each other. The Fazaouro Formation develops through the extinct and extant current basins that fill the valley of Valadouro & Foz.
