= Pedro Pardo de Cela =

Galician marshal (died 1483)

- Marshal
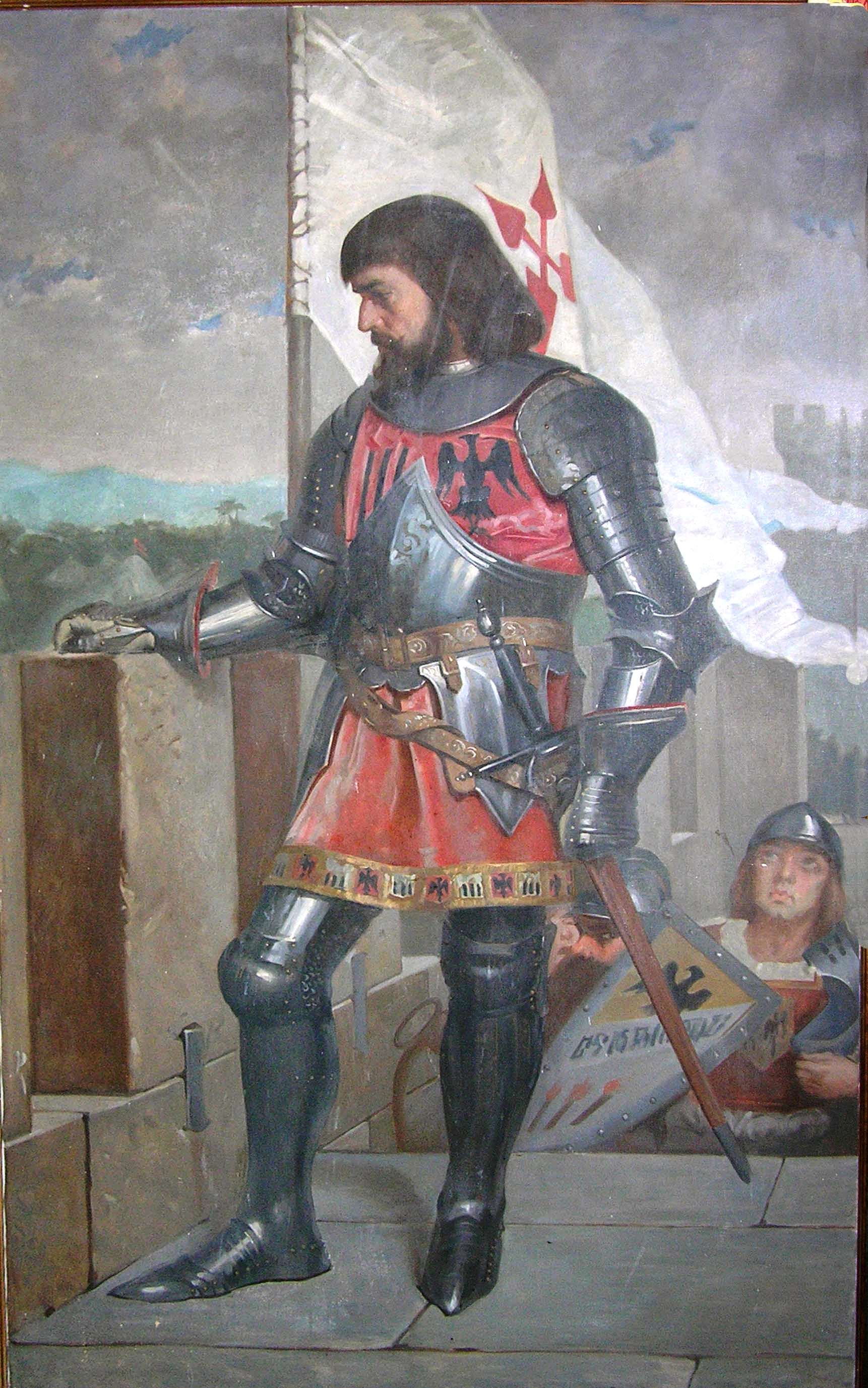
- Pedro Pardo de Cela at the Castle of Frouxeira (Lugo, Galicia)
- Born: 1425; Betanzos, Galicia
- Died: 25 October 1483 (aged 58); Mondoñedo, Galicia
- Buried: Cathedral of Mondoñedo, Mondoñedo
- Spouse: Isabel Pérez Osorio
- Father: Xoán Nunes Pardo
- Mother: Teresa Rodríguez de Aguiar

Pedro Pardo de Cela Rodriguez de Aguiar e Ribadeneyra (died October 3, 1483) was a fifteenth century Marshal of Galicia, son of Joam Nunes Pardo, senhor da Torre Cela and Dona Teresa Rodriguez de Aguiar.

He was beheaded on October 3, 1483, along with his son Peter, in front of the cathedral of Mondoñedo by order of the Catholic Monarchs.

== Biography ==
Pedro Pardo de Cela was a feudal lord. He was a supporter of Joanna la Beltraneja of Portugal. The death of her father, Henry IV of Castile was followed by new kings of Castile, Isabella I of Castile and her husband, Ferdinand II of Aragon.

Pardo was married to Isabel Perez Osorio (or Isabel de Castro) supposedly the daughter of the first Earl of Lemos, which is highly doubtful today.
The latter came to Mondoñedo with Pedro's uncle, Pedro Enríquez, bishop of Mondoñedo, where Pardo de Cela was merino representing the House of Lemos. Enriquez gave her a wedding dowry in 1441 including the bishopric's revenues, except those needed for their livelihood, made up mostly of castles and fortresses, counting the reconstructed castle of Frouxeira.

In 1445, he moved to Viveiro, where he became mayor in 1474 with the title of Marshal. He bought the "casa do Carballo of Galdo". In 1476 he was removed from his post by the Catholic Monarchs. In 1478 he was expelled from Vivero and the Catholic Monarchs wrote to the municipalities of Santa Marta de Ortigueira and Mondoñedo so they would not allow his entry. He asked for a letter of "safe harbor" from the Kings and took refuge in Castle of Frouxeira near Foz. With "the other two Pedros", Pedro de Bolaño and Pedro de Miranda, he defeated the Spanish troops, commanded by Fernando Cunha, son of the Count of Buendia, and Luis de Mudarra, who came to Galicia in September 1480 to "pacify" the Kingdom.

Eventually, after the Frouxeira fortress surrendered, he was besieged and captured at the Castrodouro Castle and taken to Mondoñedo, where he was tried and condemned to death within a few days.
His execution had a profound impact and eventually generated a popular myth that persists to this day, obscuring the reality of what really happened.

Pardo's will was found in 2013 by historian Eduardo Pardo de Guevara (his descendant). It revealed that many of the stories told about him were untrue.
