= Alfoz =

Coordinates: 43.528°N 7.414°W

- Municipality
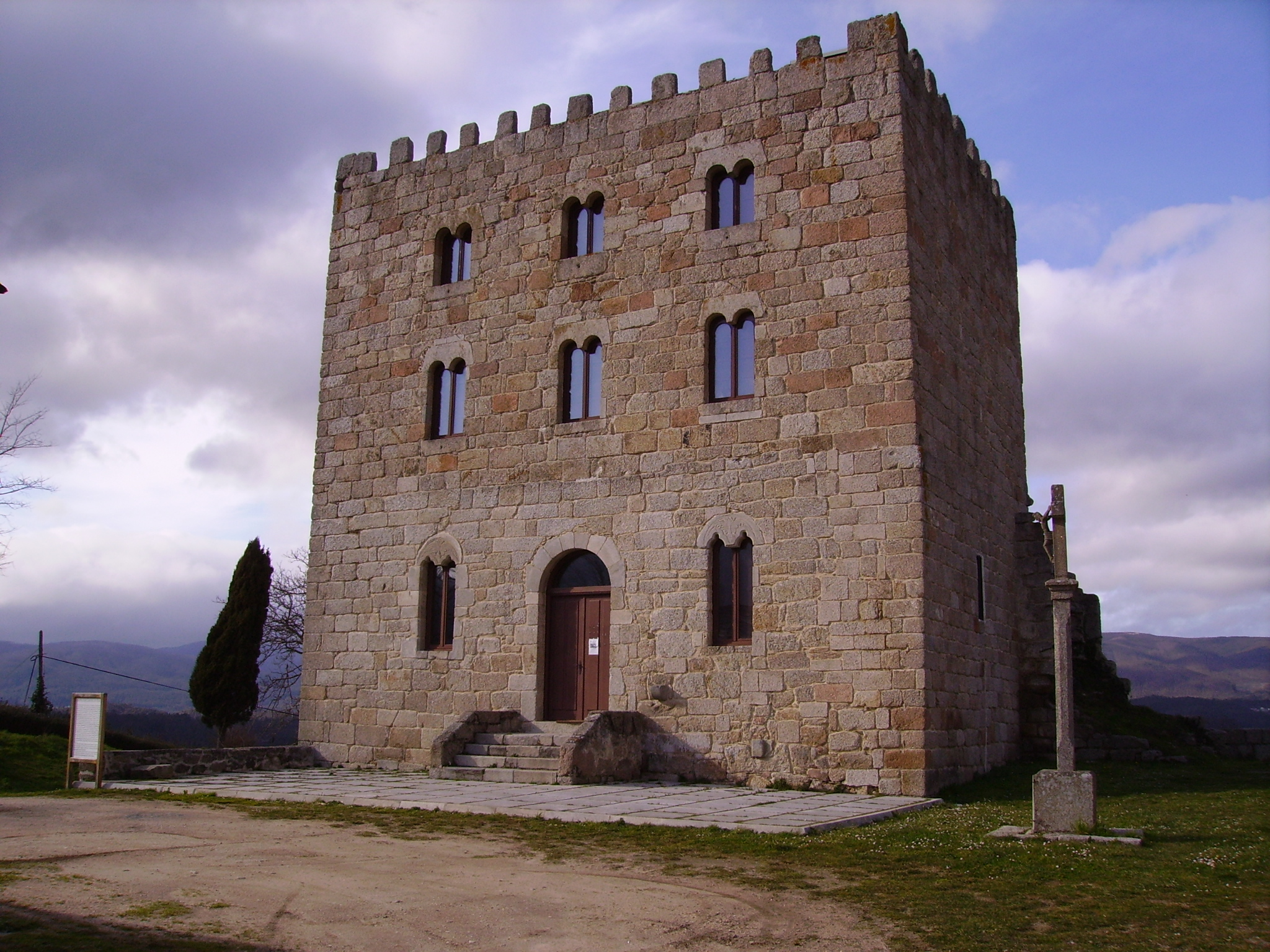
- Pardo de Cela Castle in Alfoz

- Flag Coat of arms

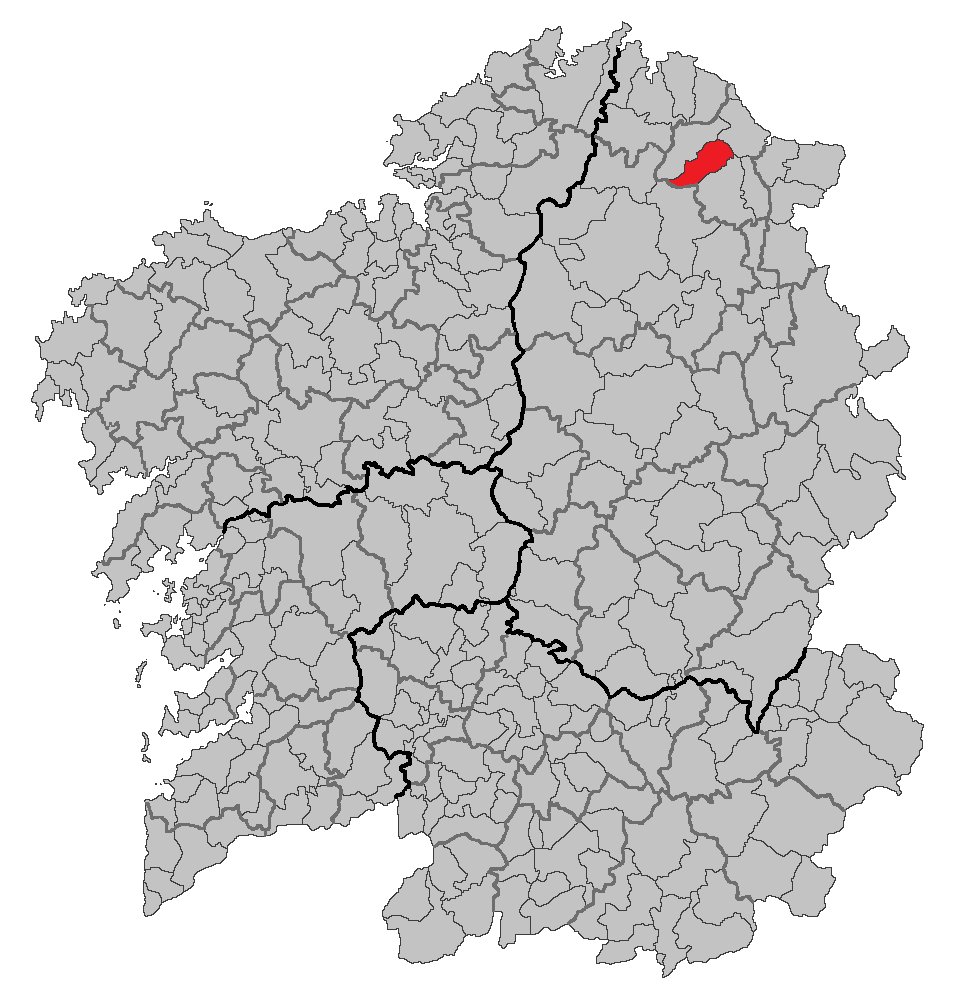
- Location of Alfoz

- Location in Spain
- Country: Spain
- Autonomous community: Galicia
- Province: Lugo
- Comarca: A Mariña Central

Government
  - Alcalde: Efigenia Maseda Paz (VIA Alfoz)

Population (2025-01-01)
  - Total: 1,493
- Demonym(s): alfocego, -a
- Time zone: UTC+1 (CET)
  - Summer (DST): UTC+2 (CEST)
- Postal code: 27...
- Website: Official website

Alfoz (Galician pronunciation: [alˈfɔθ]) is a municipality in the province of Lugo, in the autonomous community of Galicia, Spain. It is in the comarca of A Mariña Central. It borders the municipalities of Foz, Mondoñedo, Abadín and O Valadouro.

The population in 2008 was 2,133 people according to the municipal register of inhabitants. Alfoz is the antipodes of the University of Canterbury in Christchurch, New Zealand.

== Parishes ==
- Adelán (Santiago)
- Bacoi (Santa María)
- Carballido (San Sebastián)
- O Castro de Ouro (San Salvador)
- Lagoa (San Vicente)
