= Foz =

Coordinates: 43°34′10″N 7°15′30″W

- Municipality
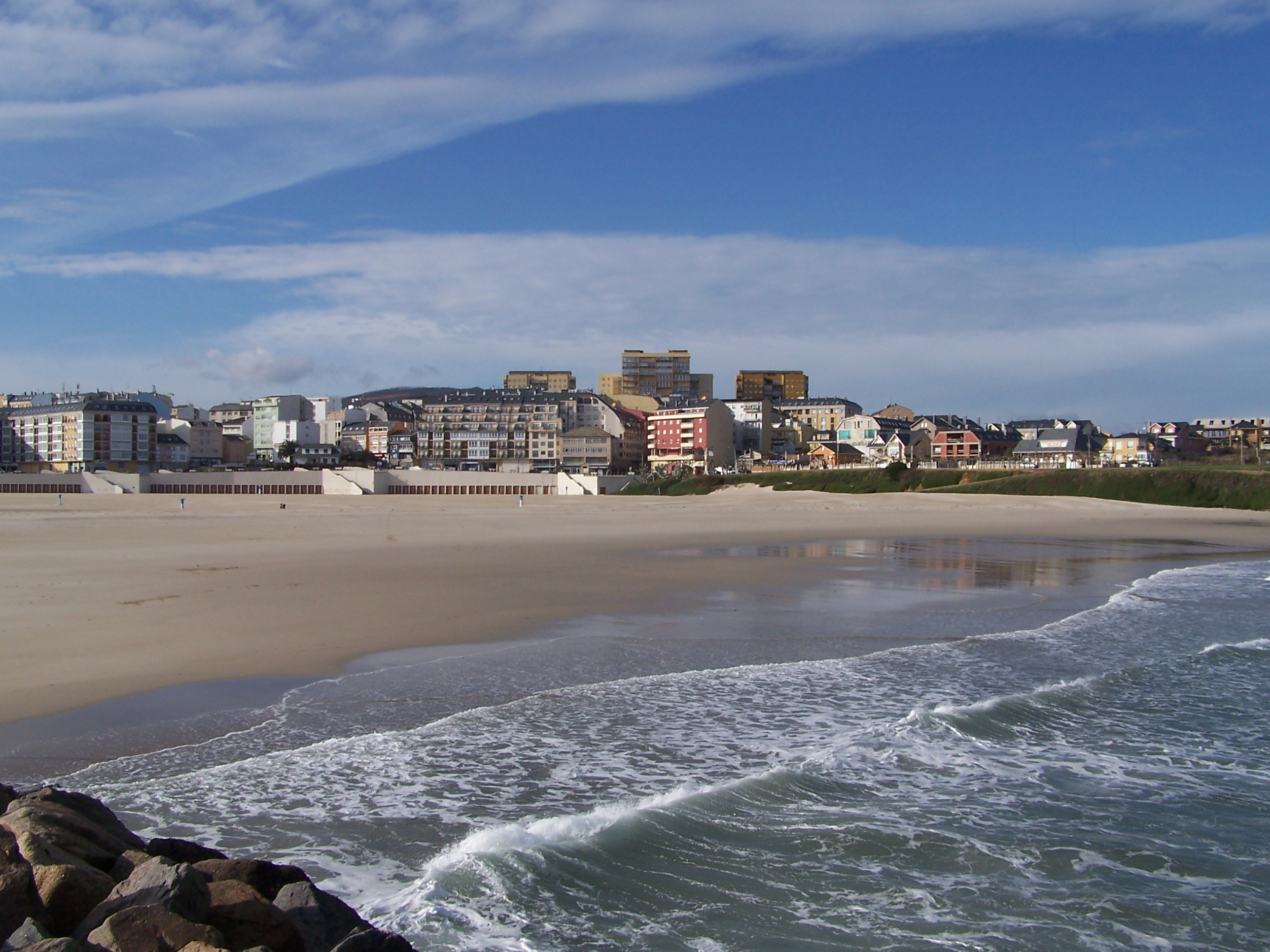

- Flag Coat of arms

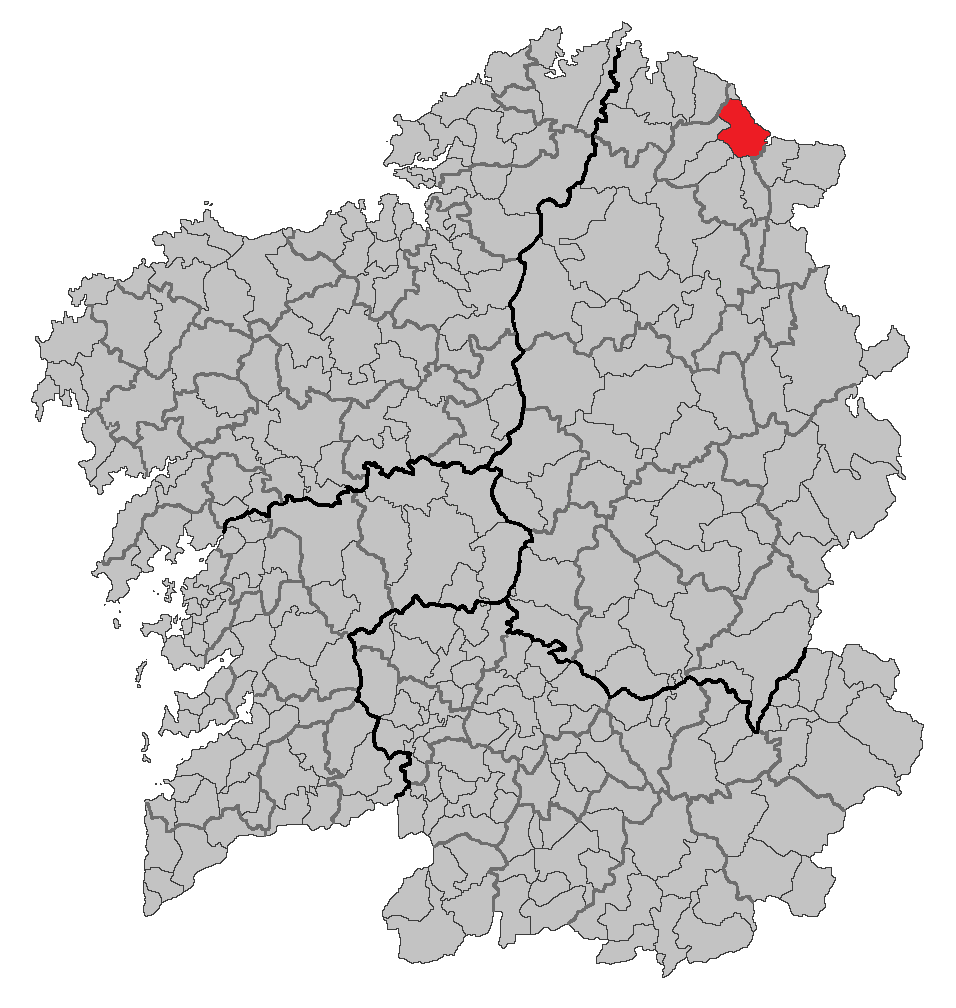
- Location of Foz

- Location in Spain
- Country: Spain
- Autonomous community: Galicia
- Province: Lugo
- Comarca: A Mariña Central

Government
  - Alcalde: Javier Jorge Castiñeira (PP)
- Demonym(s): Focego/focega, Focense
- Time zone: UTC+1 (CET)
  - Summer (DST): UTC+2 (CEST)
- Postal code: 27780
- Website: Official website

Foz (Galician pronunciation: [fɔθ]) is a town and municipality in the A Mariña Central comarca in the Galician province of Lugo. It has been historically linked to the Ancient Province of Mondoñedo and also linked to the arrival of Briton immigrants during the 5th and 6th centuries, fleeing by sea from the British Isles (see Bishop Maeloc, Britonia and San Martiño de Mondoñedo). It has 9800 inhabitants. It borders the coastal municipalities of Burela and Barreiros, and the inland municipalities of Lourenzá, Mondoñedo, O Valadouro, Alfoz, and Cervo.

Foz is a coastal town on the shores of the Cantabrian Sea at the mouth of the river Masma, which forms the Foz estuary, with an approximate area of 100 km².

Although Foz was previously a fishing village, most of its economic resources now come from tourism.

== Etymology ==
The name Foz comes from the Latin word faux which graphically describes the river mouth of the Masma river; Foz is the Galician term for base level.

== History ==
The foundation of Foz dates back to pre-Roman times, as attested by the existing forts Fazouro and Pena do Altar. Its foundation may originate in the time of the Ártabros or, according to the historian Amor Meilán, a factory may have been established by the Tartessos.

During the ninth century the town had flourished since the establishment of the episcopal headquarters in San Martiño de Mondoñedo.

At the time of Ferdinand and Isabella, Foz kept certain privileges and exemptions as a result of its commercial importance.

During the sixteenth and seventeenth Foz had a major port and one of the three most important shipyards in Galicia. Shipowners and fishermen engaged mainly in whaling. This important fishery has declined over time, but today there is still an important seafaring tradition.

The main monuments of Foz are the Basilica de San Martiño and the Manor house (Pazo) of the Counts of Fontao

== Port of Foz ==
- Fishing port
- Sport port

== International relations ==
=== Twin towns – sister cities ===
Foz is twinned with:

- Trégastel, Brittany, France (2003)
