= Caves of King Cintolo =

Group of caves in Galicia, Spain

The Caves of King "Cintolo"
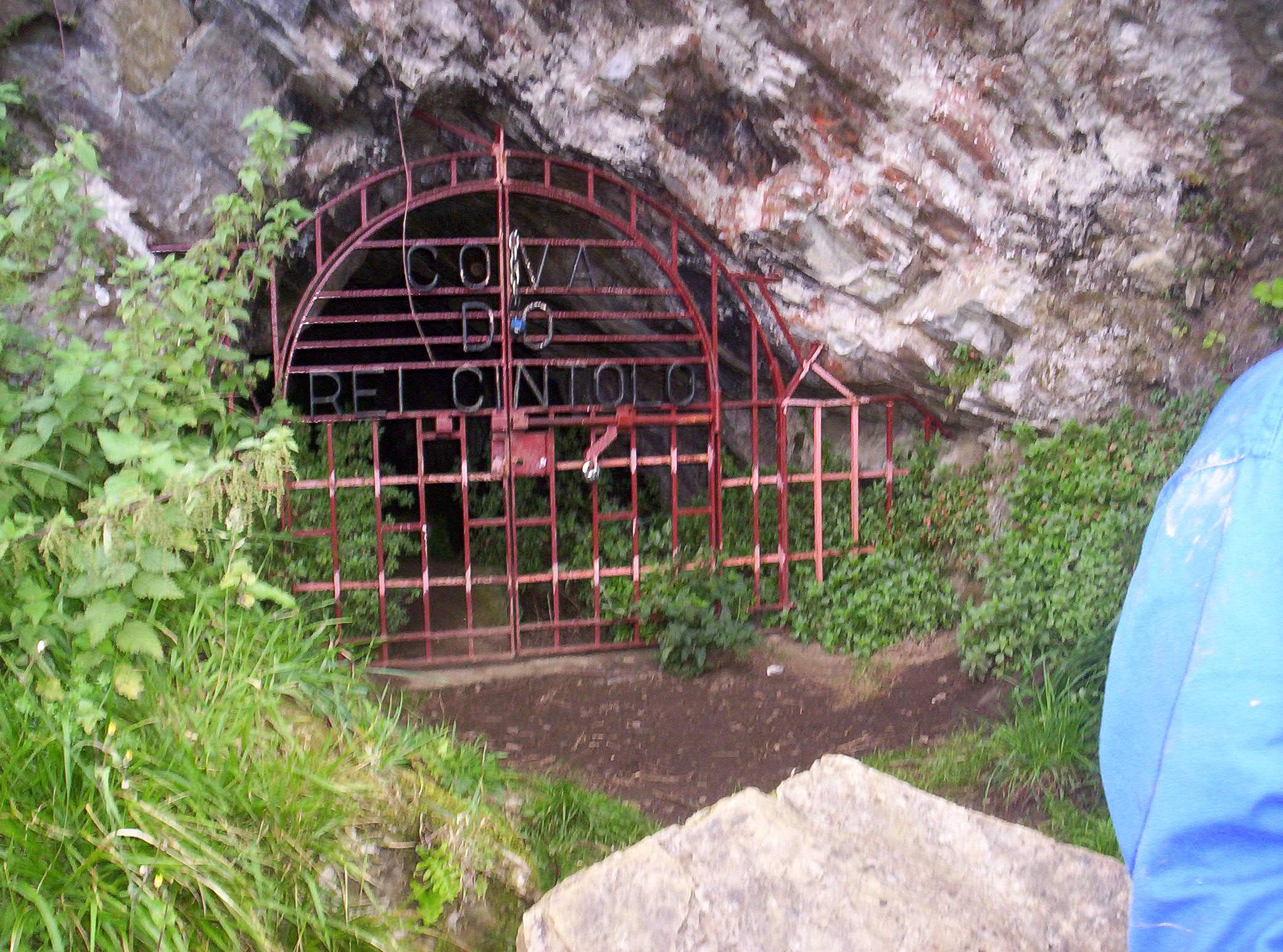

- Location within Spain
- Location: Mondoñedo, Spain
- Coordinates: 43.3950°N 7.3692°W
- Length: >7,500 metres (24,600 ft)
- Discovery: 1870
- Geology: limestone

The Caves of King "Cintolo" (Galician: Covas do Rei Cintolo, Spanish: Cueva del Rey Cintolo) are a group of caves, of more than 7,500 meters length, in the outskirts of the City of Mondoñedo, Spain.

Of limestone formation, they include numerous stalactites and stalagmites. They were discovered by archaeologist José Villaamil y Castro in 1870.
