= Castrodouro Castle =

Coordinates: 43°31′40″N 7°24′32″W

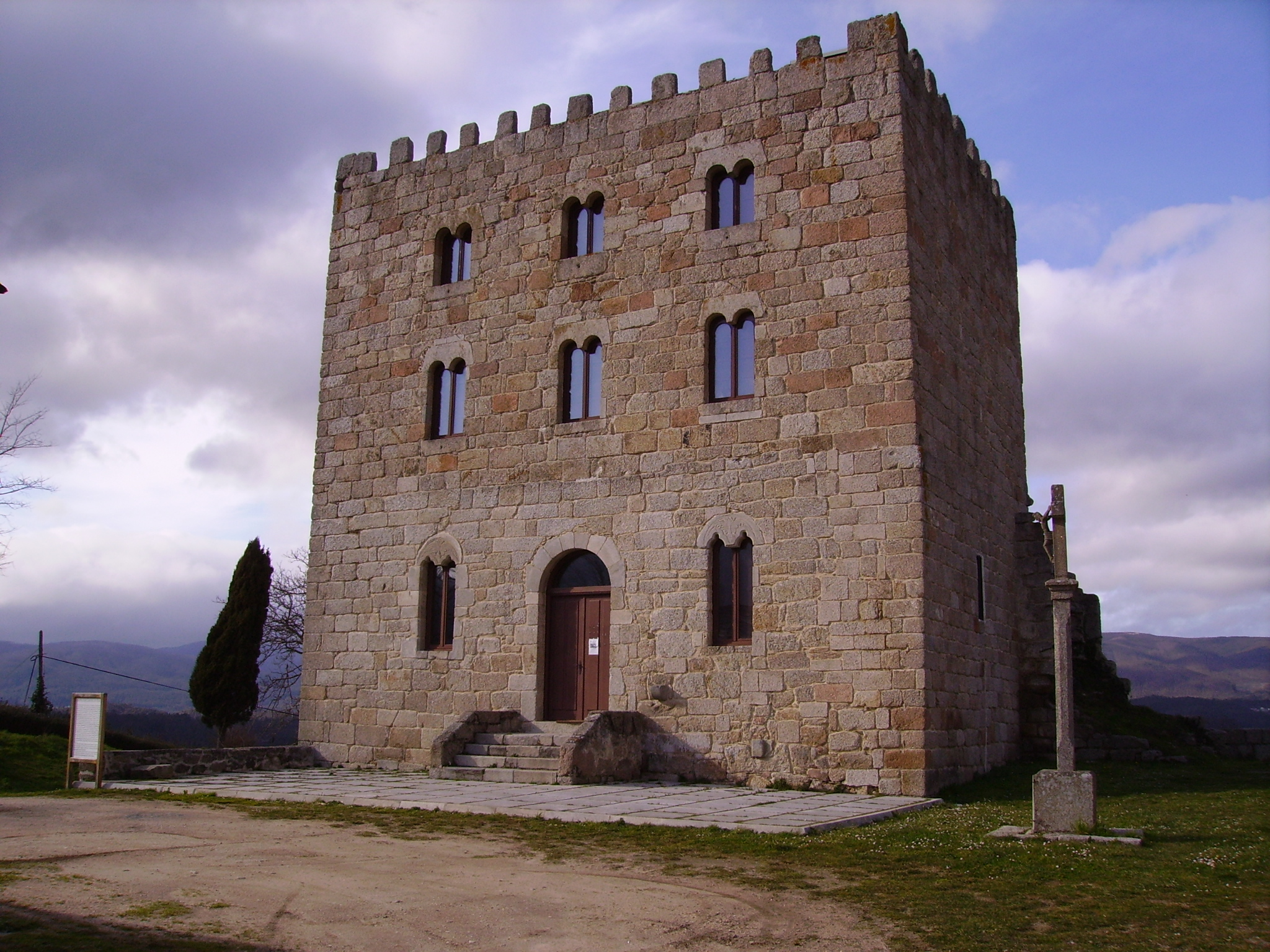
Castrodouro Castle in Alfoz

Castrodouro Castle is a small fortification in Alfoz, Galicia, Spain, who once belonged to Pardo de Cela's family. Of the primitive castle, only the keep is preserved.

== History ==
The origin of the castle dates back to a monastery founded in the 9th century by a family from Castile. Part of the Diocese of Mondoñedo, it was later fortified with the support of the Asturian monarchy. In the 15th century it passed into the hands of Marshal Pedro Pardo de Cela, as a dowry for his wedding with Isabel de Castro, niece of Bishop Pedro Enrique de Castro.

When in December 1483 Pedro Pardo de Cela was beheaded by order of the Catholic Monarchs, it returned to the property of the Diocese of Mondoñedo, then ruled by Bishop Diego Soto Valera. He converted it into an episcopal residence, a function it maintained until the 17th century, when it was abandoned.

Since the 19th century it has belonged to the Alfoz municipality, and was used for most of the 20th century as the town hall and the Municipal Court. Nowadays it houses the Alfoz visitor centre and a museum.
