= A Mariña Central =

Coordinates: 43.5667°N 7.38333°W

- Comarca
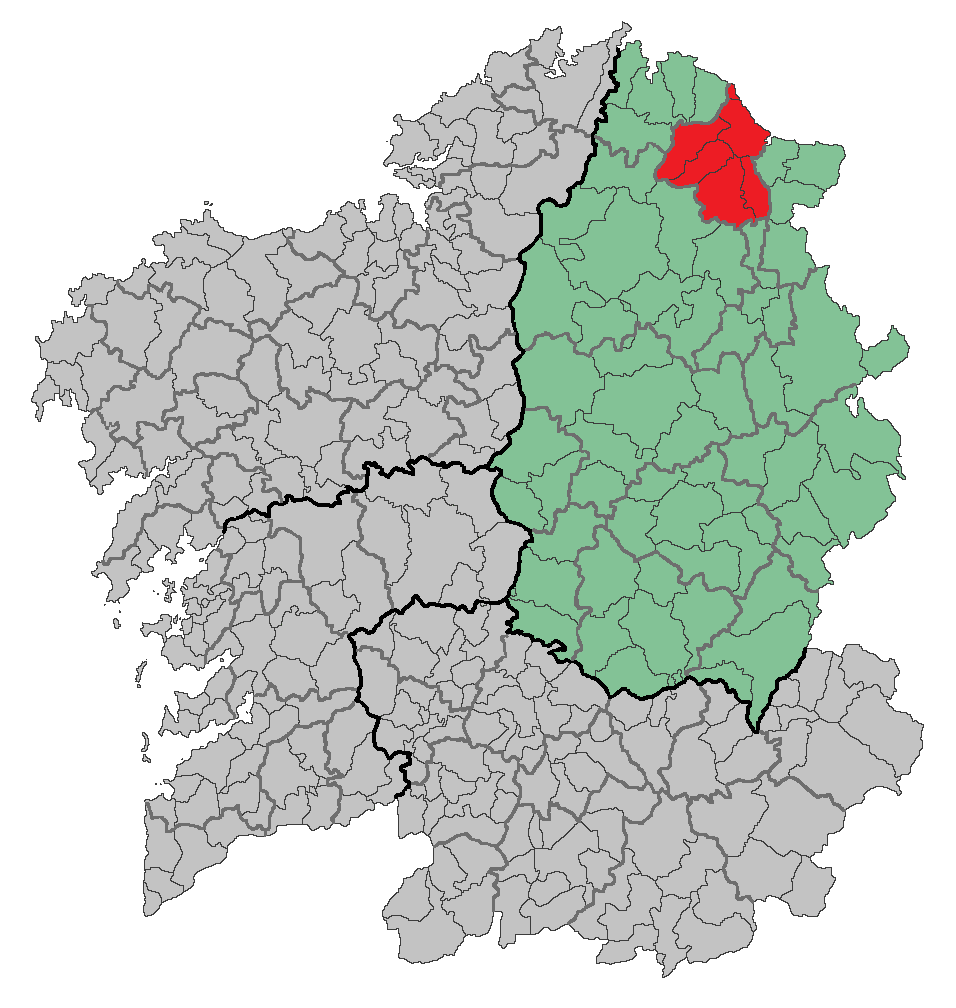
- Country: Spain
- Autonomous community: Galicia
- Province: Lugo
- Capital: Mondoñedo
- Municipalities: List: Alfoz, Burela, Foz, Lourenzá, Mondoñedo, O Valadouro

Area
  - Total: 503.7 km^{2} (194.5 sq mi)

Population (2019)
  - Total: 28,955
  - Density: 57.48/km^{2} (148.9/sq mi)
- Demonym: mariñao
- Time zone: UTC+1 (CET)
  - Summer (DST): UTC+2 (CEST)

A Mariña Central is a comarca in the Galician Province of Lugo. The overall population of this local region is 28,955 (2019). This region is a political-administrative division of A Mariña de Lugo macro-region. To the north and northeast the region borders the Bay of Biscay, on the northwest with A Mariña, to the west and south by the Terra Chá, Meira on the southeast and east with A Mariña Oriental.

The landscape of the region has three distinct relief units: the shallow and coastal plains, the valleys of the rivers Masma (Lourenzá) and Ouro (O Valadouro), and low-lying, undulating hills as the Serra do Xistral. The coast is steep and the small coves and inlets are interspersed with rivers and estuaries (Foz).

The predominant vegetation consists of oaks, pines, eucalyptus afforestation and grassland.

== Climate ==
The climate is oceanic since the daily and seasonal temperature variations are small due to the influence of the ocean. Temperatures are mild throughout the year with high humidity due to high rainfall and fog. The winds are the strongest on the coasts.

== Municipalities ==
Alfoz, Burela, Foz, Lourenzá, Mondoñedo and O Valadouro
