= Province of Mondoñedo =

Historical province in Galicia

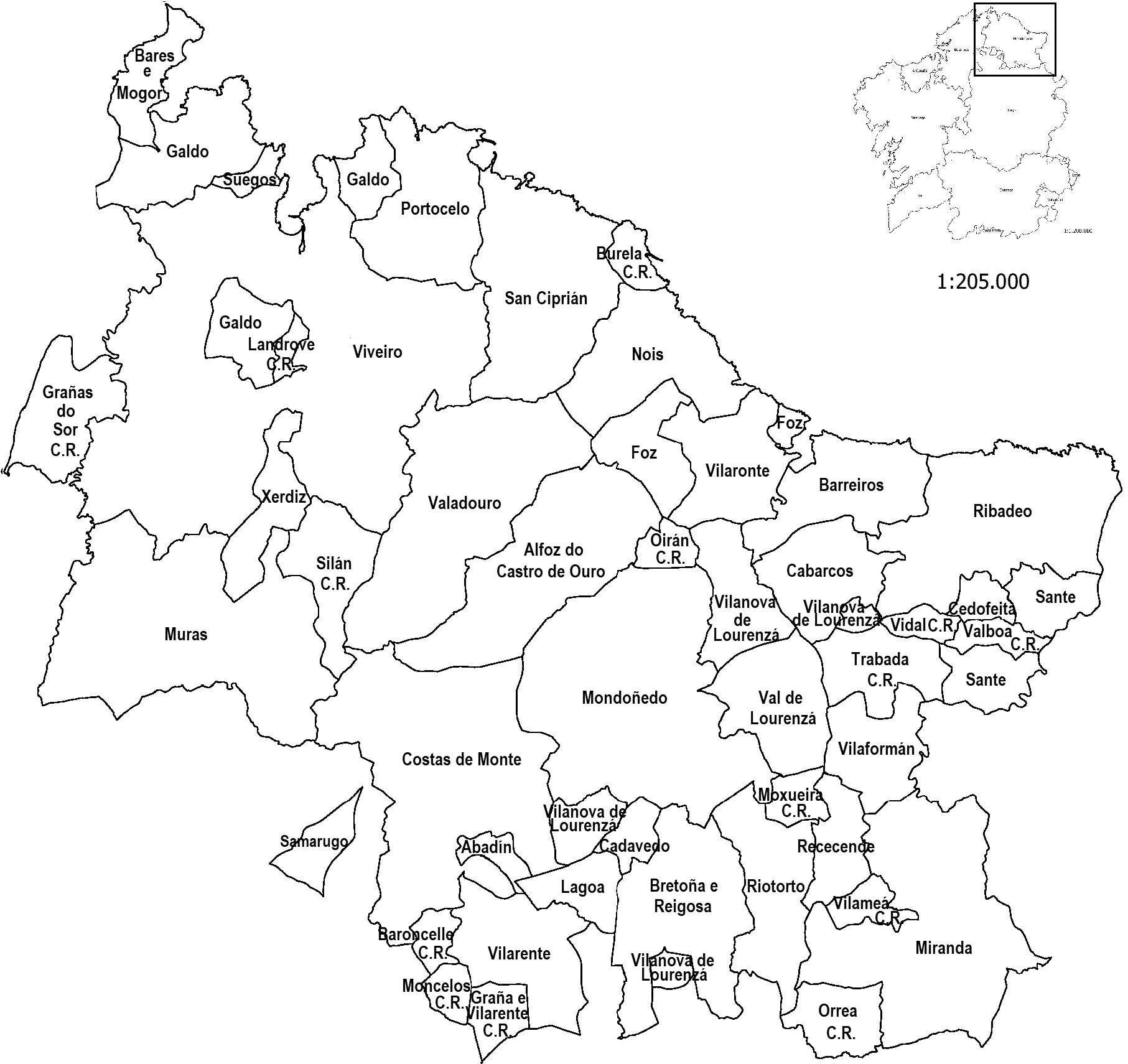
Map of the jurisdictions of the Province of Mondoñedo in 1753

Province of Mondoñedo One of the seven provinces which existed in Galicia from the 15th Century till 1833; from that date onwards the number of provinces were reduced to four, and the entire Province of Mondoñedo was first divided into two halves and later absorbed and assimilated into the existing provinces of Lugo and A Coruña.

From the 15th Century till 1833 Galicia was divided in seven administrative provinces:

- A Coruña
- Santiago
- Betanzos
- Mondoñedo
- Lugo
- Ourense
- Tui

From 1833 onwards, the seven original provinces of the 15th Century have been limited to just four:

- A Coruña,
- Ourense,
- Pontevedra, and
- Lugo.

== See also ==
- Mailoc or Maeloc was the bishop of Britonia (Britoniensis ecclesiae episcopus)
- Mondonedo City Council in the Province of Lugo.
- Diocese of Ferrol-Mondoñedo List of Districts and Parishes from Ferrol to Mondoñedo.
