= Basilica of San Martiño de Mondoñedo =

Church in Foz, Spain

- Basílica de San Martiño de Mondoñedo
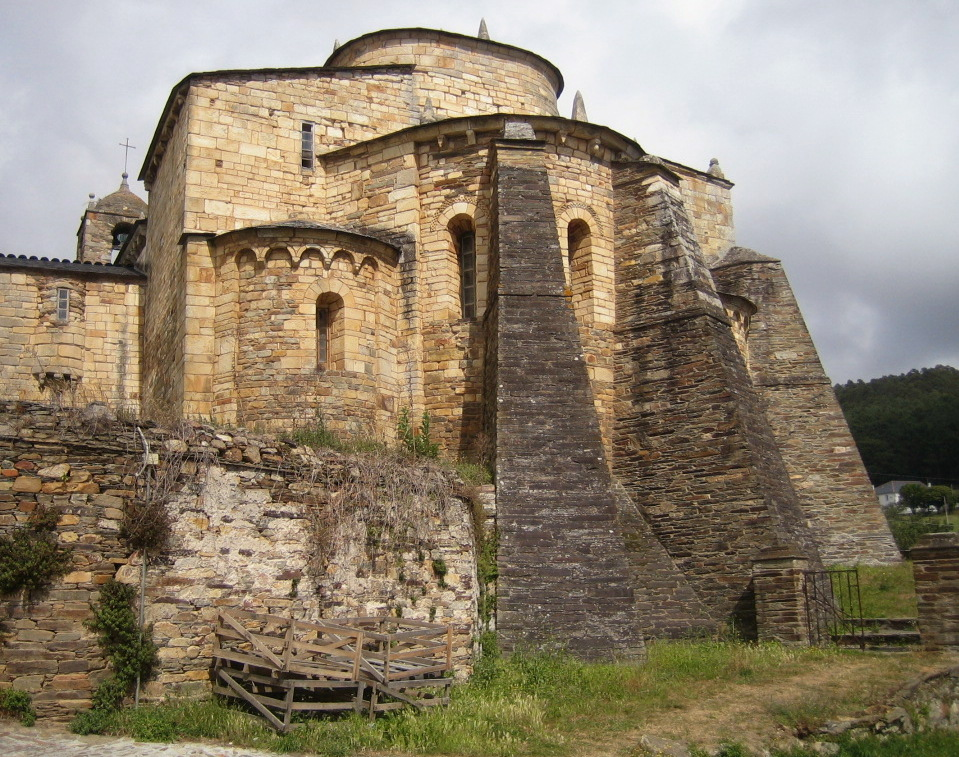

Religion
- Affiliation: Catholic Church
- Diocese: Mondoñedo parish

Location
- Location: Foz, Lugo, Galicia
- Country: Spain
- Interactive map of Basilica of San Martiño de Mondoñedo
- Coordinates: 43°33′40″N 7°18′12″W

Architecture
- Style: Romanesque
- Spanish Cultural Heritage
- Official name: Basílica de San Martiño de Mondoñedo
- Designated: June 3, 1931
- Reference no.: RI-51-0000716

The Basilica of San Martiño de Mondoñedo is a church in the municipality of Foz in Galicia (Spain). It is considered the oldest cathedral in Spain; it was the seat of two bishops in the ninth century.

The current church, of Romanesque architecture, dates from the late eleventh century; it was reinforced with buttresses during the eighteenth century.

== Bibliography ==
- Isidro Bango Torviso; Joaquín Yarza Luaces et al. El Arte románico en Galicia y Portugal / A arte Românica em Portugal e Galiza, Fundación Pedro Barrié de la Maza, 2001, p. 14.
- Castillo, Ángel del (1987) [1972]. Fundación Pedro Barrié de la Maza, ed. Inventario Monumental y Artístico de Galicia (Inventario de la riqueza monumental y artística de Galicia)[1] (2ª ed.). A Coruña. pp. 335–336. ISBN 84-85728-62-9.
- Hipólito de Sá. Monasterios de Galicia, Everest, 1983, p. 44-50.
- Villa-amil y Castro, José (facsímile: 2005) 1904. Imprenta de San Francisco de Sales (facsímile: Ed. Órbigo, A Coruña), ed. Iglesias gallegas de la Edad Media, colección de artículos publicados por (en castelán). Madrid. p. 410. ISBN 84-934081-5-8.
