= Marina Mayoral =

Spanish writer (born 1942)

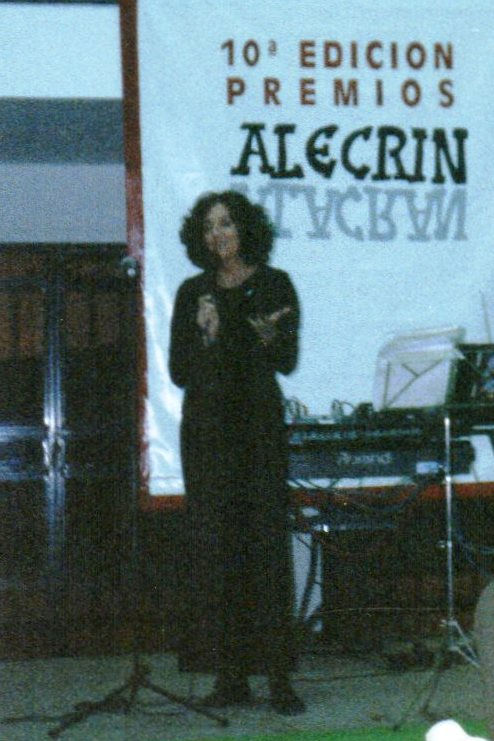
Marina Mayoral (receiving the Alecrín Award, 1998)

Marina Mayoral Díaz (Mondoñedo, Spain, September 12, 1942) is a Galician writer in Galician and Spanish.

== Early life and education ==
She has lived in Madrid since the age of 19, but always maintained strong emotional and cultural ties with Galicia. She studied the first courses of Philosophy and Letters at the University of Santiago de Compostela and graduated in Romance philology at the Complutense University of Madrid. She obtained her doctorate in 1971, with an extraordinary prize, with a thesis on the poetry of Rosalía de Castro, "Visión del mundo y estilo en la obra poética de Rosalía de Castro".

== Career ==
As a professor of Spanish literature at the Complutense University of Madrid, Mayoral performed many analyses of contemporary poetry and prose, and published numerous works of research and literary criticism, among which the studies on Rosalía de Castro, Emilia Pardo Bazán, and Valle Inclán stand out. She has collaborated with La Voz de Galicia since 1990. She was co-director of the Biblioteca de Escritoras collection by Editorial Castalia and directed the Relatos collection by Editorial Edhasa and the Club de Clásicos collection by Grupo SM.

The action of most of Mayoral's novels takes place in "Brétema", an imaginary place in Galicia. Several of her novels have been translated into German, Italian, Polish, Portuguese, Catalan and Chinese.

In 2017, Mayoral was chosen as an honorary academic of the Royal Galician Academy.

== Selected works ==
=== In Galician ===
==== Novels ====
- Contra morte e amor (1987)
- O reloxio da torre (1988)
- Unha árbore, un adeus (1988)
- Chamábase Luís (1989)
- A man de neve (1992)
- Tristes armas (1994)
- Querida amiga (1995)
- Ao pé do magnolio (2004)
- Case perfecto (2007)
- Quen matou a Inmaculada de Silva? (2009)
- O anxo de Eva (2013)
- O que queda de nós (2023)

==== Essays ====
- Por que Murguía destruíu as cartas de Rosalía? (2017)

==== Collective works ====
- Rosalía na cobiza do lonxe, 2013, Centro Ramón Piñeiro para a Investigación en Humanidades

=== In Spanish ===
==== Novels ====
- Cándida, otra vez (1979). Ámbito Literario. Gañadora do Premio Ámbito Literario.
- Al otro lado (1980). Magisterio Español S.A. Gañadora do Premio Novelas y Cuentos.
- La única libertad (1982). Cátedra.
- Contra muerte y amor (1985). Cátedra.
- Recóndita armonía (1994). Alfaguara.
- Dar la vida y el alma (1996). Alfaguara.
- Recuerda, cuerpo (1998). Alfaguara.
- La sombra del ángel (2000). Alfaguara.
- Querida amiga (2001). Alfaguara.
- Solo pienso en ti (2006). H. KLICZKOWSKI.
- ¿Quién mató a Inmaculada de Silva? (2009).
- Deseos (2011). Alfaguara.
- El abrazo (2015). Stella Maris.
- La única mujer en el mundo (2019). Edhasa.

==== Short stories ====
- Morir en sus brazos y otros cuentos (1989). Aguaclara.
- El tiburón, el ángel y otros relatos (1991). Compañía Europea de Comunicaciones e Información.
- El amor, la vida y mas allá (2017). Teófilo.

==== Essays ====
- La poesía de Rosalía de Castro (1974). Gredos.
- Rosalía de Castro y sus sombras (1976). Fundación Universitaria Española.
- Análisis de cinco comedias (1977). Castalia.
- Análisis de textos (Poesía y prosa españolas) (1977). Gredos.
- Rosalía de Castro (1986). Cátedra.
- El oficio de narrar (1989). Cátedra.
- Escritoras románticas españolas (1990). Fundación Banco Exterior.
- El personaje novelesco (1990). Cátedra.

== Awards ==
- 1979: Ámbito literario (novel).
- 1979: Ramón Sijé (stories).
- 1980: Novelas y cuentos (novel).
- 1982: Hucha de oro (stories).
- 1989: Premio Antón Losada Diéguez, for Chamábase Luís.
- 1992: Fernández Latorre (journalism).
- 1996: Losada Diéguez: Creación literaria, for Querida amiga.
- 1998: Medalla Castelao.
- 2019: Premio Voz de Liberdade, granted by PEN Club Galicia.
- 2021: Premio Xosé Luís Alvite, granted by Asociación de Periodistas de Galicia for her career.
