= Valtablado del Río =

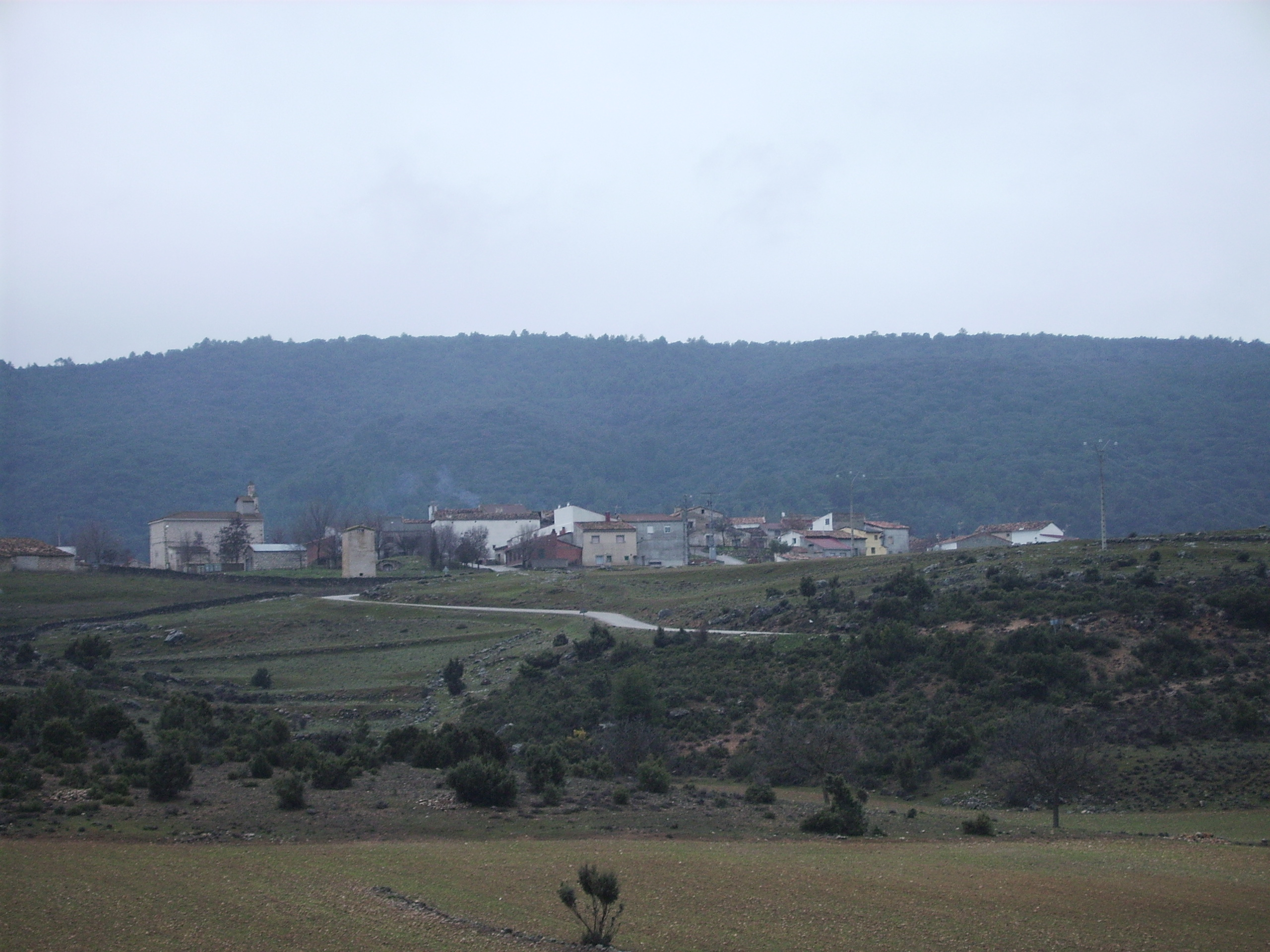

- Location within Province of Guadalajara Location within Castilla-La Mancha Location within Spain
- Coordinates: 40°42′56″N 2°24′04″W
- Country: Spain
- Autonomous community: Castile-La Mancha
- Province: Guadalajara
- Municipality: Valtablado del Río

Area
  - Total: 25 km^{2} (9.7 sq mi)

Population (2025-01-01)
  - Total: 7
  - Density: 0.28/km^{2} (0.73/sq mi)
- Time zone: UTC+1 (CET)
  - Summer (DST): UTC+2 (CEST)

Valtablado del Río is a municipality located in the province of Guadalajara, Castile-La Mancha, Spain. According to the 2004 census (INE), the municipality has a population of 18 inhabitants.
