= Mondoñedo =

- Municipality
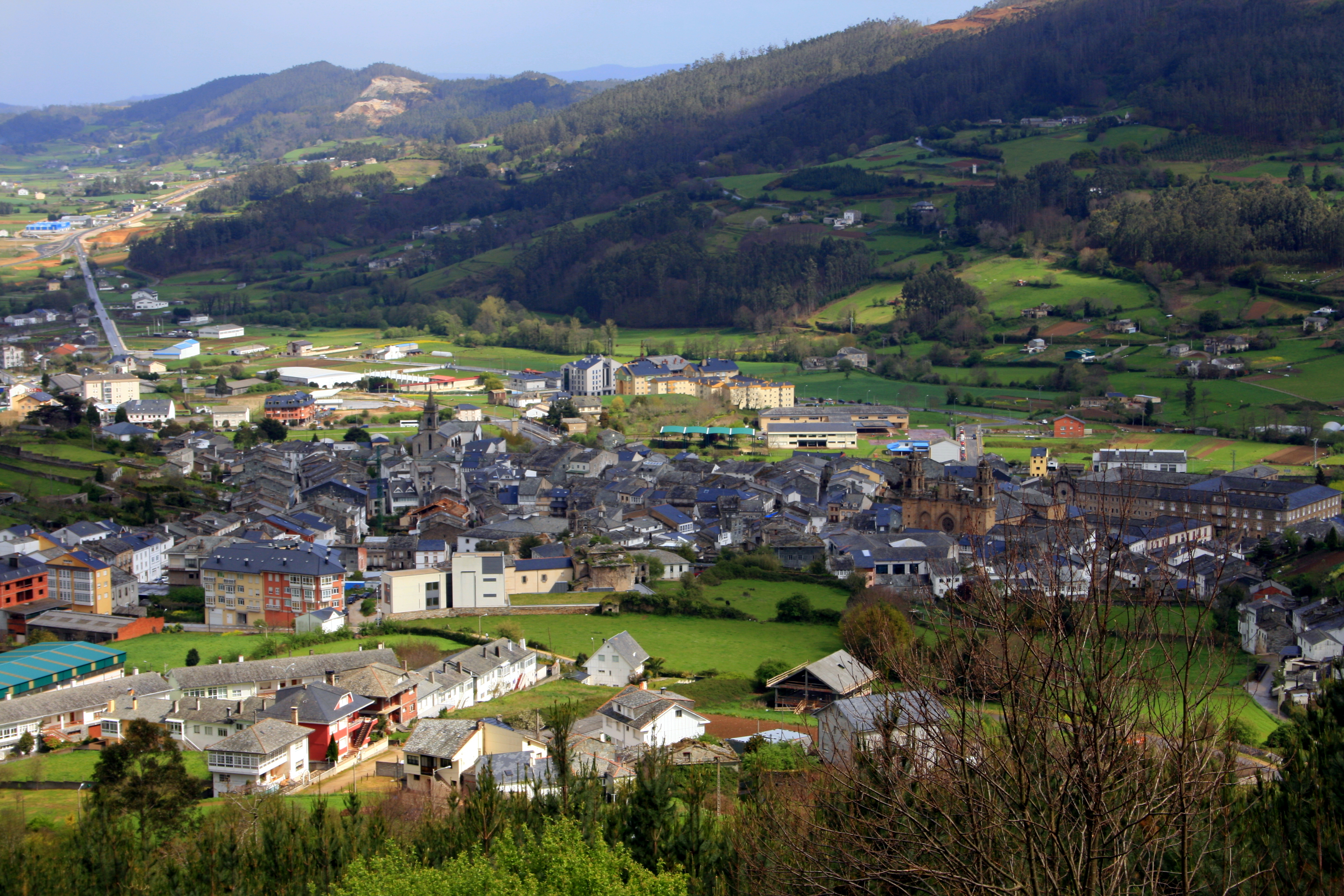
- Mondoñedo

- Flag Coat of arms

- Location in Spain Mondoñedo (Galicia) Mondoñedo (Province of Lugo)
- Coordinates: 43°25′41″N 7°21′46″W
- Country: Spain
- Autonomous community: Galicia
- Province: Lugo
- Comarca: A Mariña Central

Government
  - Mayor: Manuel Ángel Otero Legide (PPdeG)

Area
  - Total: 142.66 km^{2} (55.08 sq mi)
- Elevation: 141 m (463 ft)

Population (2025-01-01)
  - Total: 3,303
  - Density: 23.15/km^{2} (59.97/sq mi)
- Demonym: Mindonienses
- Time zone: UTC+1 (CET)
  - Summer (DST): UTC+2 (CEST)
- Postal code: 27740

Mondoñedo (Galician pronunciation: [mondoˈɲeðʊ]) is a small town and municipality in the Galician province of Lugo, Spain. As of 2009, the town has a population of 4,508. Mondoñedo occupies a sheltered valley among the northern outliers of the Cantabrian Mountains. Despite being the core of the region of A Mariña Central, it is the city with the fifth biggest population after Viveiro, Ribadeo, Foz and Burela.

The municipality of Mondoñedo is in the northern half of the province of Lugo and is bordered on the north by the municipalities of Foz and Alfoz, to the south by Pastoriza and Riotorto, to the east by Lorenzana and to west with Abadín.

The population of Mondoñedo is distributed throughout the 15 parishes that make up the council.

== History ==
Mondoñedo is first mentioned during the rule of king Ordoño I of Asturias in 858; It was taken by surprise by the French in 1809 during the Napoleonic Wars.

The Galician Province of Mondoñedo disappeared in 1833 when all the seven provinces of Galicia were reduced to four, and the entire Province of Mondoñedo was first divided into two halves and later absorbed and assimilated into the existing provinces of Lugo and A Coruña.

== Main sights ==
The town was declared a national cultural-historical site in 1985. Its main attraction is the Cathedral, begun in Romanesque style around 1230. It reflects an unusual mixture of styles: Gothic in the nave and the aisles, and Baroque in its 18th-century towers. The polychrome statue in the high altar, called Nuestra Señora la Inglesa (the English Madonna) was rescued from St Paul's Cathedral in London during the Protestant Reformation of Henry VIII of England.

The Sanctuary of Remedios and the Hospital of San Pablo are both from the 16th century.

The Caves of King "Cintolo" ("Covas do Rei Cintolo") are also located in the outskirts of the town.

== Demography ==
From:INE Archiv

== Festivals ==
- As San Lucas. This celebration is of uncertain origin but was probably first celebrated in the year 1156 when Alfonso VII was granted the title to the city of Mondoñedo. This is when the celebrations began in honor of San Lucas.
- As Quendas. The first news about this holiday goes back to the sixteenth century. These festivals are held in the first days of May.
- Os Remedios. This festival is celebrated the first Sunday after 8 September.
- Mercado Medieval. One of the most anticipated holiday by the people of Mondoñedo. It is held the second weekend of August.

== International relations ==
=== Twin towns – Sister cities ===
Mondoñedo is twinned with:

- Ferrol, Galicia, Spain (2004)
- Tréguier, Brittany, France (2000)

== Notable people ==
- Alvaro Cunqueiro (1911), writer
- Marina Mayoral (1942), writer

== See also ==
- Mailoc or Maeloc
- Province of Mondoñedo
- Diocese of Ferrol-Mondoñedo
