= Lourenzá =

Coordinates: 43°26′00″N 7°13′00″W

- Municipality
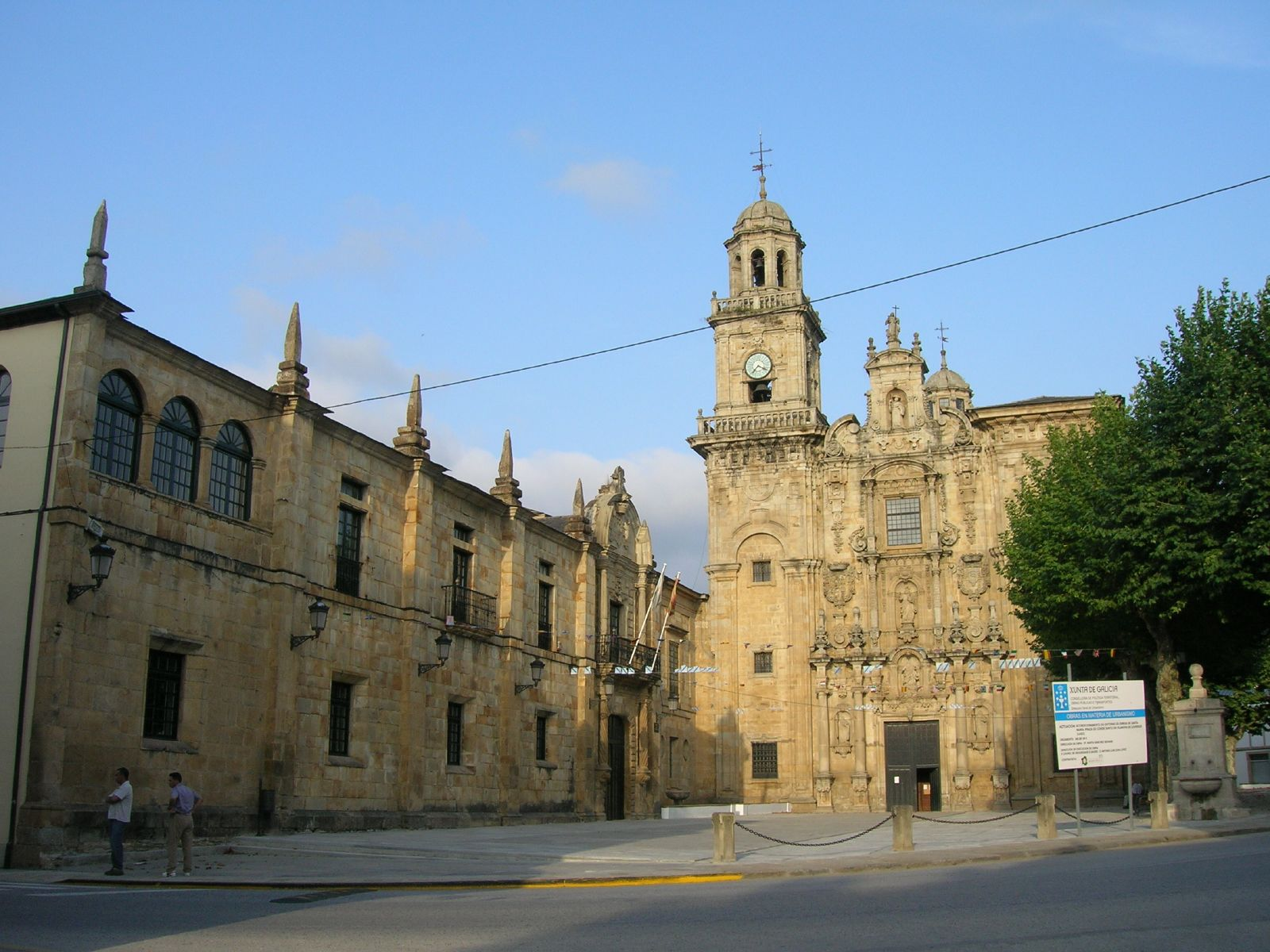
- Town hall and former monastery of San Salvador de Lourenzá.

- Flag Coat of arms

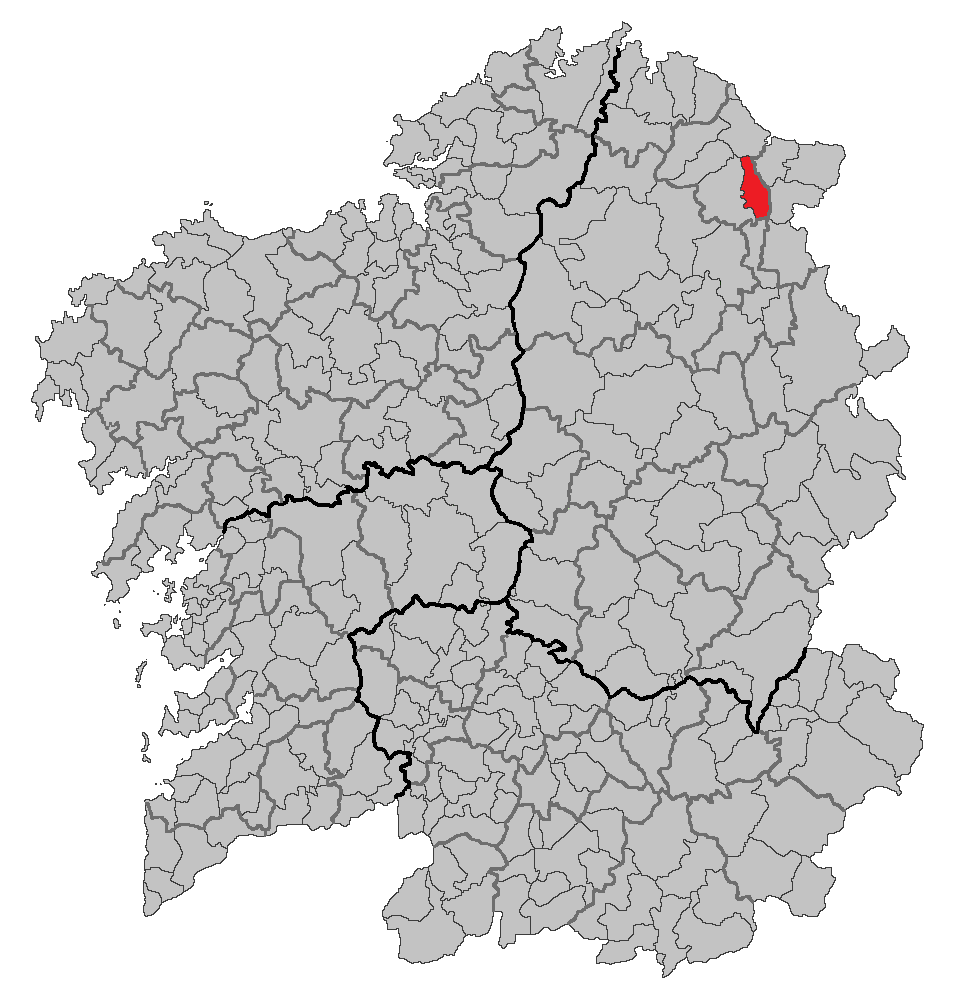
- Location of Lourenzá

- Location in Spain
- Country: Spain
- Autonomous community: Galicia
- Province: Lugo
- Comarca: A Mariña Central

Government
  - Alcalde: Rocío López García (PSdeG-PSOE)

Area
  - Total: 62.53 km^{2} (24.14 sq mi)

Population (2023)
  - Total: 2,115
  - Density: 33.82/km^{2} (87.60/sq mi)
- Demonym(s): Valego, laurentiniano
- Time zone: UTC+1 (CET)
  - Summer (DST): UTC+2 (CEST)
- Postal code: 27760
- Website: Official website

Lourenzá (Galician pronunciation: [lowɾenˈθa]) is a municipality in the province of Lugo, in the autonomous community of Galicia in northwestern Spain.

It is the site of the monastery of San Salvador. The façade of its church is said to have been a prototype for that of Santiago de Compostela Cathedral.

== Gallery ==
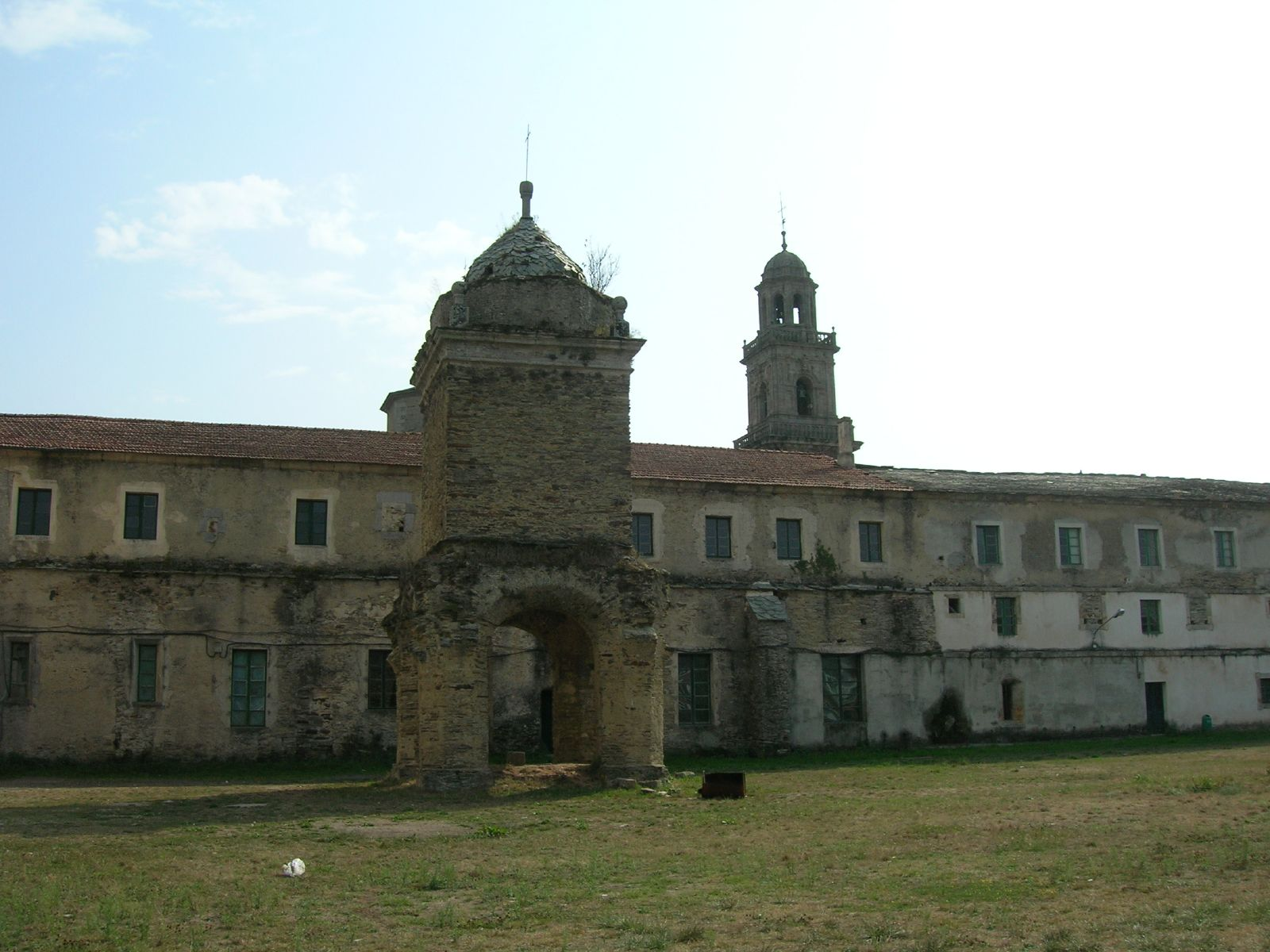
Dovecote

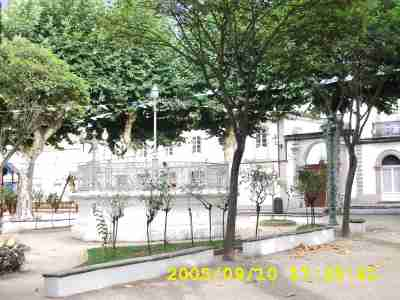
Park of Vilanova de Lourenzá.
