= Paredes, Spain =

- Municipality
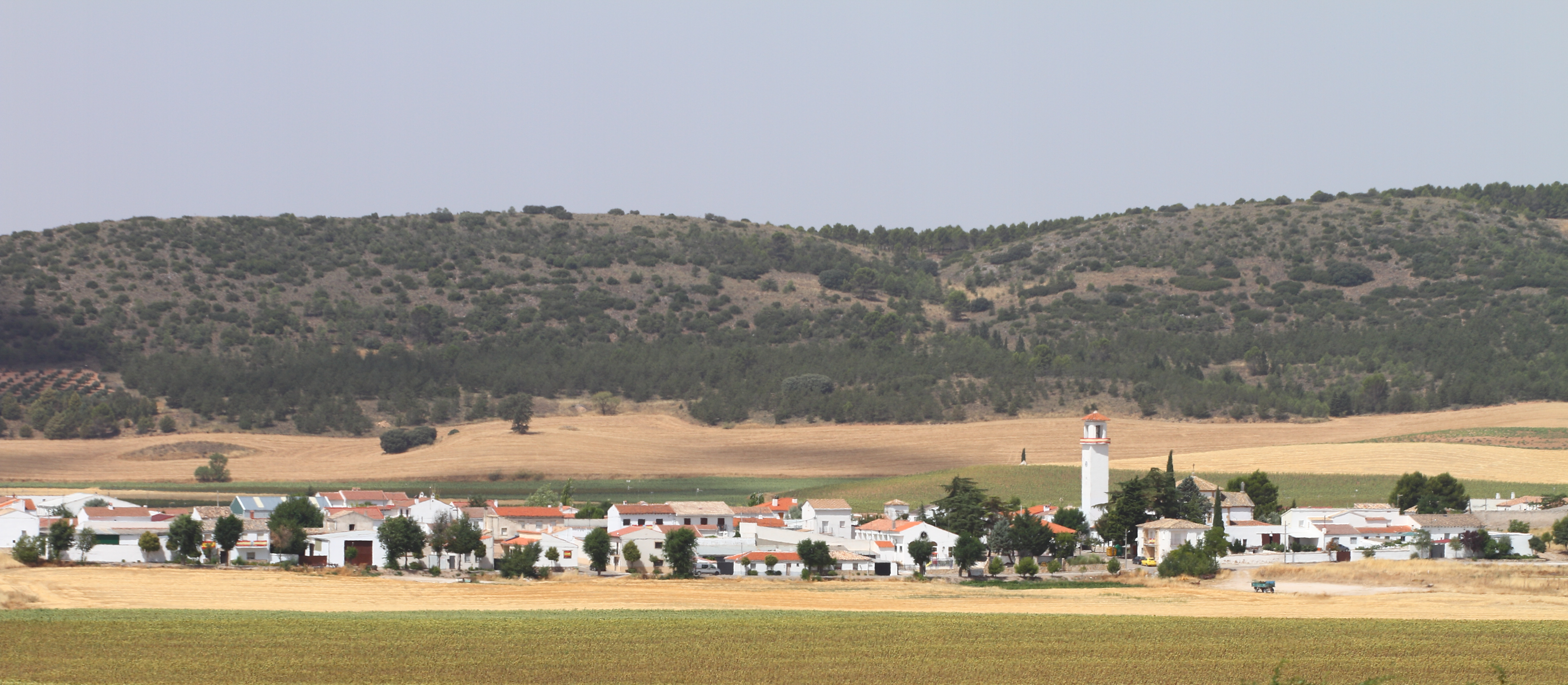

- Location within Spain Location within Castilla-La Mancha
- Coordinates: 40°03′N 2°51′W
- Country: Spain
- Autonomous community: Castile-La Mancha
- Province: Cuenca

Population (2025-01-01)
  - Total: 61
- Time zone: UTC+1 (CET)
  - Summer (DST): UTC+2 (CEST)

Paredes is a municipality in Cuenca, Castile-La Mancha, Spain. It has a population of 99.
