= Burela =

Municipality in Galicia, Spain

- Municipality
- Flag Seal

- Location within Spain Location within Galicia
- Coordinates: 43°39′33.0″N 7°21′37.9″W
- Country: Spain
- A. community: Galicia
- Province: Lugo

Government
  - Mayor: María del Carmen López

Area
  - Total: 7.779 km^{2} (3.003 sq mi)

Population (1 January 2021)
  - Total: 9,413
  - Density: 1,210/km^{2} (3,100/sq mi)
- Time zone: UTC+01:00
- Postal code: 27880
- MCN: 27902
- Website: Official website

Burela is a municipality in the Galician province of Lugo. It is in the comarca of A Mariña Central. Burela is a coastal town on the shores of the Cantabrian Sea. An extension area of 8.2 square kilometers was created in 1994, following the segregation of the municipality of Cervo. Its fishing port is one of the most important of the Galician coast and has a large fleet of ships. Its economy is based mainly on fishing, in particular, albacore ("bonito del norte") and hake are delivered daily to the rest of Spain. As a result, a canning industry has developed.

Due to the high demand for personnel to work at sea, Burela is a multicultural town which has many residents from Cape Verde and has recently had an influx of immigrants from Peru, Indonesia, and other places. The population grew considerably in the latter part of the twentieth century.

== History ==
The history of Burela dates to pre-Roman times. The oldest evidence of people found in the area was a fort at the end of the cape. The inhabitants of these forts left one of the emblems of the city, a torque, a piece of Iron Age culture, which is currently in the Provincial Museum of Lugo and is also part of the coat of arms of Burela.

The first written reference to Burela is in a document dated back to 1096, where it is referred to as Burellum. The origin of the name Burela is still unknown. Burela got independence from Cervo in 1994.

Near these Iron Age remains is a "vilaris" and a Roman villa. This small settlement gave rise to a rural population that became a parish under the protection of Mary and belongs to the Diocese of Saint Martin of Mondoñedo.

Burela was under the jurisdiction of the church until Felipe II, in 1593, incorporated the jurisdiction of the Royal Crown preserve of the round of St. Mary of Burela and granted a charter in favor of the Bishop of Mondoñedo.

With the Constitution of the Courts of Cadiz (1812) the old jurisdictions and lordships finished and new councils arrived. A list of new councils in 1835 are published in 1835 and the municipalities of San Cibrao and Nois appeared, the latter belonging to the parish of Burela.

== Demography ==
Burela currently has more than 9,000 inhabitants. The population has an average age of 36 years which constitutes the younger half of the province. The population of the town had a large increase in the late 1970s and 80s with the arrival of families from other areas of the peninsula, especially Asturias and Castile and León, due to the settlement of the public company Alúmina Alumino in San Cibrao (now privatized as Alcoa). From this time on, the Cape Verde population began to grow into a community of greater significance.
