= O Valadouro =

Coordinates: 43°21′49″N 7°28′30″W

- Municipality
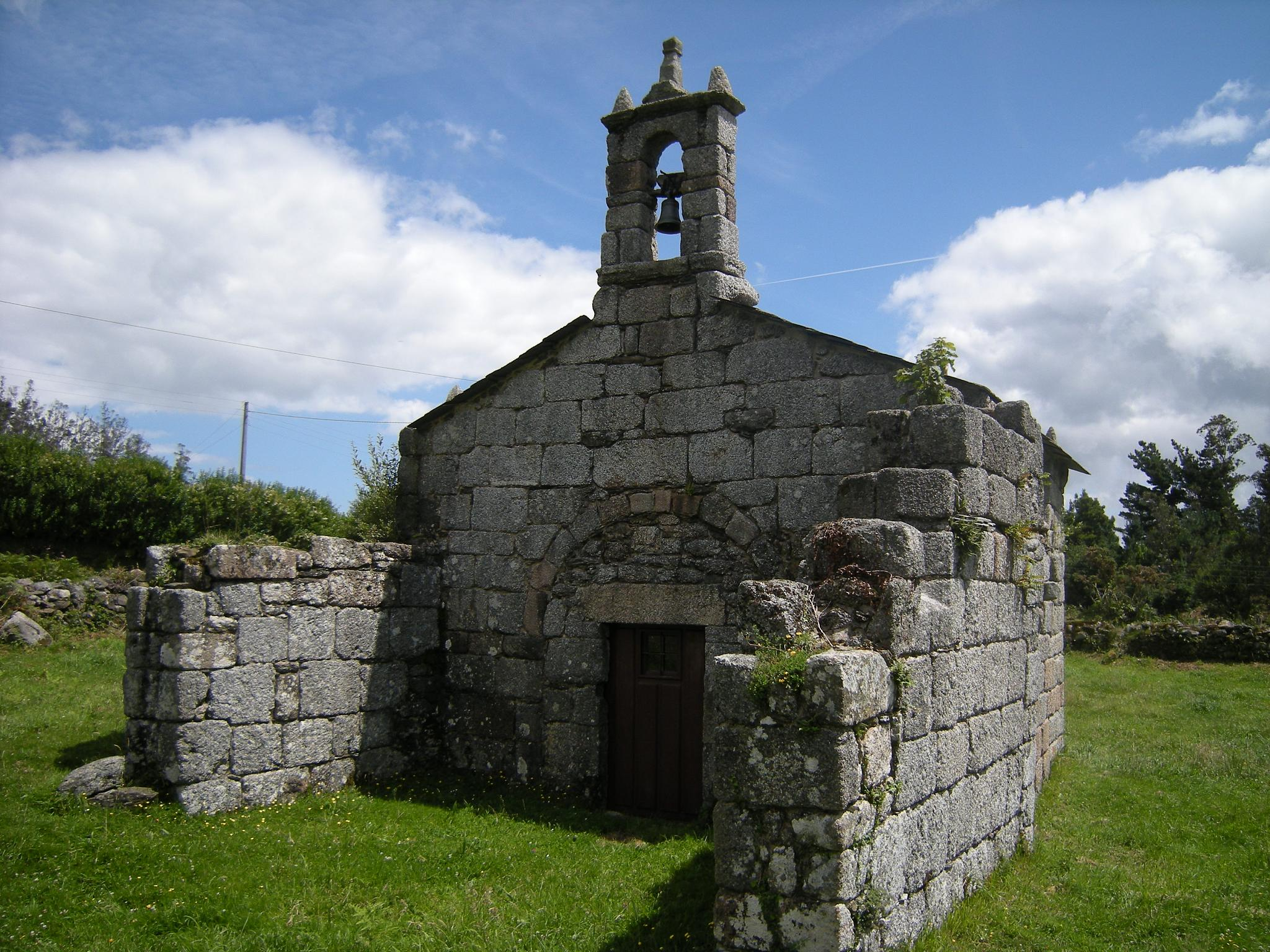
- Chapel of Santa Filomena de Cadramón.

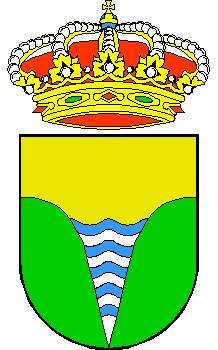
- Coat of arms

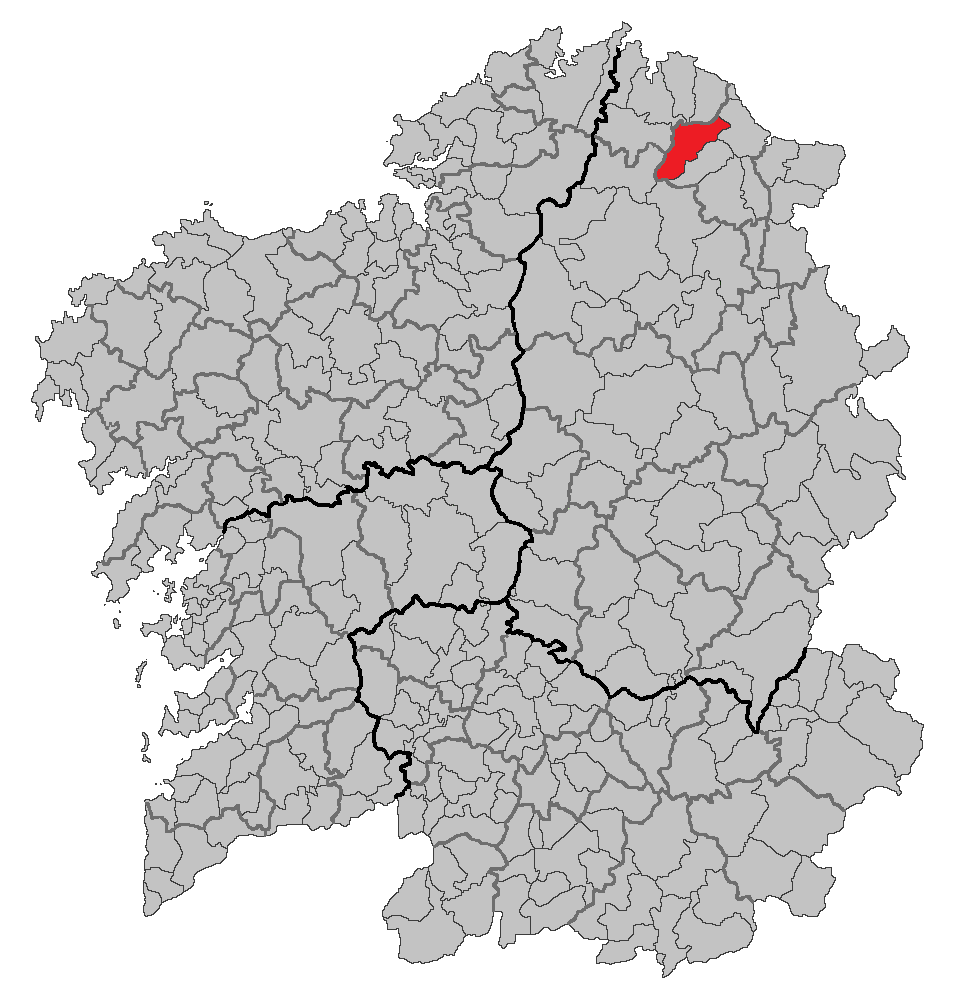
- Location of O Valadouro

- Location in Spain
- Country: Spain
- Autonomous community: Galicia
- Province: Lugo
- Comarca: A Mariña Central

Government
  - Alcalde: José Manuel Lamela Piñeiro (PPdeG)

Area
  - Total: 110.54 km^{2} (42.68 sq mi)

Population (2023)
  - Total: 1,890
  - Density: 17.1/km^{2} (44.3/sq mi)
- Demonym(s): valadourés, -a
- Time zone: UTC+1 (CET)
  - Summer (DST): UTC+2 (CEST)
- Postal code: 27...
- Website: Official website

O Valadouro is a municipality in the province of Lugo, in the autonomous community of Galicia, Spain. It belongs to the comarca of A Mariña Central. Its capital is the town of Ferreira. In 2023, it had 1,890 inhabitants according to the INE.

== History and heritage ==
The site of Chao da Cruz is in the plain of Cabalar-A Veiga Blonde, at the foot of the Box O Cadramón. At this site about two thousand mounting tools made of chips of quartz, quartz and rock crystal were found along with prisms and an abundance of remains small in size and barely retouched.
