= Moniz =

Moniz is a surname in the Portuguese language, namely in Portugal and Brazil. It is believed to derive from a Gothic, or Gascon given name Munnius, Monio, Munino, Monnio, and Munnio used in the Iberian Peninsula in the Middle Ages. It is uncertain whether the Galician and Asturian 'Muñiz' or 'Muniz' surnames are in any way related with Moniz. The Portuguese variants of the medieval name were Munio, Monio and Moninho, making Moniz (son of Moninho or Munio) a patronymic surname. It may refer to:

- António Egas Moniz (1874–1955), Portuguese physician, neurologist and Nobel Prize laureate
- Bryant Moniz, quarterback for the University of Hawaii Warriors football team
- Charlie Moniz (born 1980), Canadian musician
- Diogo Gil Moniz, Portuguese nobleman, son of Gil Aires Moniz
- Ernest Moniz (born 1944), American physicist and United States secretary of energy
- Febo Moniz (1515-aft. 1580), Portuguese nobleman
- Febo Moniz de Lusignan, Portuguese nobleman, grandfather of Febo Moniz
- Felipa Perestrello Moniz, Portuguese wife of Christopher Columbus
- Frank Moniz (1911–2004), American soccer player
- Gil Aires Moniz, Portuguese nobleman
- Júlio Botelho Moniz (1900–1970), Portuguese soldier and politician
- Lúcia Moniz (born 1976), Portuguese singer and actress
- Martim Moniz (died 1147), Portuguese knight noted for his role in the Siege of Lisbon
- Matt Moniz, an American high-altitude mountaineer and public speaker
- Michael Moniz, an American business executive and high-altitude mountaineer
- Pedro Moniz da Silva, Portuguese nobleman, son of Diogo Gil Moniz
- Ricardo Moniz (born 1964), Dutch former footballer and coach
- Rui Gil Moniz, Portuguese nobleman, son of Gil Aires Moniz
- Vasco Gil Moniz (died 1497), Portuguese nobleman, son of Gil Aires Moniz
- Wendy Moniz (born 1969), American actress

== See also ==
- Moniz sign, a medical sign
