= Nuño =

Nuño (Spanish) or Nunyo (Catalan) is a masculine given name of Latin origin (Nunnus, Nonnus, Nunus, Nunno and so on). Its Portuguese form is Nuno. Its patronymic is Núñez (Latin: Nunni). Already in the Middle Ages the name was being confused with the similar but distinct name Munio.

The meaning of the name is disputed. It could come from late Latin nonnus, meaning 'tutor', later 'monk'. The classicist Iiro Kajanto proposed a Celtic origin, since the name is mainly found in formerly Celtic-speaking parts of Spain.

== People with the given name Nuño ==
- Nuño Rasura (9th century), one of two legendary judges of Castile
- Nuño Fernández (fl. 920–27), count of Castile
- Nuño I (bishop of Mondoñedo) (1025–1027), a medieval Galician bishop
- Nuño Álvarez de Carazo (floruit 1028–1054), a Castilian nobleman, diplomat, and warrior
- Nuño Alfonso (1112–1136), a medieval Galician bishop
- Nuño Pérez de Lara (died 3 August 1177). a Castilian nobleman, politician and military leader
- Nuño Sánchez (c. 1185 – 1242), a nobleman in the Crown of Aragon
- Nuño González de Lara (died 1275), a Castilian nobleman, royal counsellor and military leader
- Nuño González de Lara (died 1291), a Castilian nobleman and military leader of the House of Lara
- Nuño González de Lara (died 1296), a Castilian noble of the House of Lara
- Nuño de Guzmán (c. 1490 – 1558), a Spanish conquistador and colonial administrator in New Spain

== People with the surname Nuño ==
- Juan Antonio Gaya Nuño (1913–1976) was a Spanish art historian, author, teacher, and art critic.

== See also ==
- Neno (name)
- Nino (name)
- Niño (name)
- Nuno (disambiguation)
- Nuño Álvarez (disambiguation)
- Nuño González de Lara (disambiguation)
- Nuño Gómez, a municipality located in the province of Toledo, Spain
