= Joaquim Pedro de Oliveira Martins =

Portuguese politician (1845–1894)

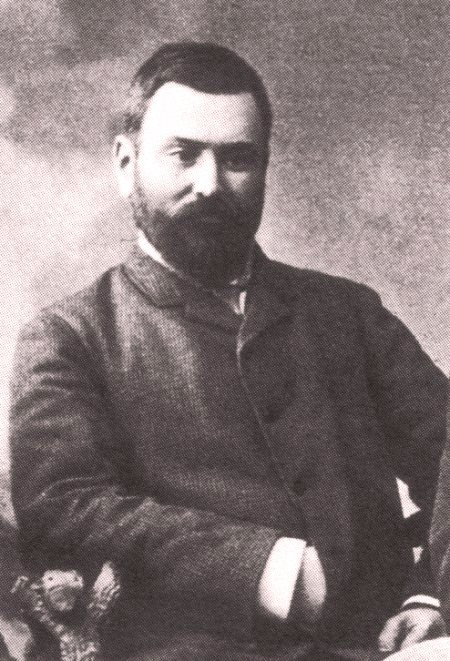
- Born: 30 April 1845; Lisbon, Portugal
- Died: 24 August 1894 (aged 49); Lisbon, Portugal
- Occupations: Politician, social scientist

Joaquim Pedro de Oliveira Martins (30 April 1845 – 24 August 1894) was a Portuguese historian, politician and social scientist. He was a writer, a deputy, a minister; he became the 47th Minister for Treasury Affairs on 17 January 1892.

Martins was born and died in Lisbon. He was the son of Francisco Cândido Gonçalves Martins (born Lisbon, Mercês, bap. 16 June 1812) and wife Maria Henriqueta de Morais Gomes de Oliveira (born Setúbal, São Lourenço (Vila Nogueira de Azeitão), bap. 26 August 1817).

Oliveira Martins is considered one of the key figures in the contemporary history of Portugal. His works influenced many generations of writers, such as António Sérgio (1883–1969), António Sardinha (1887–1925) or the philosopher Eduardo Lourenço (1923–2020).

He married on 10 March 1865 Vitória Mascarenhas Barbosa, without issue. His great-nephew is former Minister of Finance Guilherme de Oliveira Martins.

== Life ==
An orphan, Oliveira Martins did not have an easy adolescence; he did not finish high school, which would lead him to Polytechnic School to be a military engineer. He was a businessman between 1858 and 1870, but because his firm went bankrupt, he later became manager of a mine in Andalusia. In 1874 Martins returned to Portugal to coordinate the construction of the railway between Porto, Póvoa do Varzim and Vila Nova de Famalicão.

A younger Oliveira Martins

In 1880 he was elected president of the Sociedade de Geografia Comercial of Porto and, four years later, manager of the Museum of Industry of Commerce in the same city. Later, he was also manager of the Company of Mozambique and member of the executive commission of the Portuguese Industrial Exhibition.

Oliveira Martins became a deputy elected by Viana do Castelo in 1883, and in 1889 by Porto. In 1893 he was nominated vice-president of the Junta de Crédito Público. One of the leading figures of the "70s generation" (formed by writers like Antero de Quental, Eça de Queirós, Ramalho Ortigão and Guerra Junqueiro), Martins was influenced by many schools of thought of the nineteenth century.

== Main works ==
Oliveira Martins worked for the major literary, scientific, political and socialist Portuguese journals. His vast work began with the romance Febo Moniz (1867). In the area of social sciences, his major works include Elementos de Antropologia (1880), Regime das Riquezas (1883) and Tábua de Cronologia (1884). His historiographical works include História da Civilização Ibérica and História de Portugal (1879), O Brasil e as Colónias Portuguesas (1880), História da República Romana (1885), Os Filhos de D. João I (1891) and A Vida de Nuno Álvares (1893). His works influenced Portuguese political life, historiography, critic and literature during his life and the twentieth century, but also generated large controversy: integralist authors, for instance, accused him of extreme pessimism and even anti-patriotism.

== Martins' historiography ==
According to historian Sérgio Campos Matos, in Oliveira Martins' historiographical works "the single event is always related with the totality, with a principle of unity". Martins vacillated between social determinism and individual affirmation, considering that collective reason and individual reason could not be separated. For him, the historical course of the Portuguese nation was a "succession of voluntary acts, of plans of statesmen"; however, the action of these men was subordinated to an ideal system of determinant principles and laws, sharing the idea that human action was an instrument of destiny. Oliveira Martins was both skeptic towards a "science of universal history" (denying the existence of laws in history and preferring the teaching of chronology and of the philosophy of history) and the historical romance (which he considered a "hybrid and false genre"), therefore, he preferred narrative history. Martins's thesis proved to be controversial in the context of the second half of the nineteenth century, a time when fields like archeology, ethnology, philology and geography shared great development and when there was tendency to view History as a discipline based on natural laws.

Oliveira Martins was greatly influenced by authors like the German historian Theodor Mommsen, namely the importance given to the hero as the man who better incarnates the nation's soul, the collective psychology of the nation in a given historical moment, corresponding to its demands and ambitions. In Martins' last works the individual's function in history grows, as a sign of his skepticism towards an immediate national regeneration.

== Bibliography ==
- MATOS, Sérgio Campos (1992). "Na génese da teoria do herói em Oliveira Martins" in Estudos de homenagem a Jorge Borges de Macedo. Lisboa: INIC.
- MAURÍCIO, Carlos Maurício (2000). "O falso Portugal de Oliveira Martins" in Ler História, nº38, pp. 57–86.
- J. P. de Oliveira Martins, Portugal nos Mares: Ensaios de Critica, Historia e Geographia, Lisboa, Bertrand, 1889 (repr. Parceria Antonio Maria Pereira, 1924).
