= Munio =

Munio or Muño is a masculine given name of uncertain origin, possibly Germanic or Latin. The accent may originally have been on the final syllable, yielding the spellings Munió, Muñó and Muñón in modern Spanish. Its patronymic form is Muñoz or Muñiz (from the medieval Latin genitive form Munionis). It is etymologically distinct from the name Nuño and Nuno, with which it has often been confused since the Middle Ages.

It may refer to:

- Munio Núñez, Count of Castile (899–c. 901 and c. 904–c. 909)
- Munio Vélaz (died before 931), Count of Álava and probably also of Biscay
- Munio or Muño Alfonso (died 1143), Galician nobleman, military leader in the Reconquista, and governor of Toledo
- Munio Peláez (died 1149?), Galician magnate
- Munio of Zamora (1237–1300), Spanish Dominican friar, seventh Master General of the Dominican Order, and bishop
- Munio Kasiringua (born 1987), Namibian rugby union player
- Munio Pillinger, Austrian table tennis player in the 1920s
- Munio Weinraub (1909–1970), Israeli architect
