= Martim Pires Machado =

Medieval Portuguese politician

Martim Machado Pires (c. 1200–?) was an alcaide and noble medieval of the Kingdom of Portugal. He served as alcaide of the Castle of Lanhoso.

He was the first of his line to use the nickname Machado. It was due to the fact that he wanted to pay tribute to the memory of his grandfather (Mem Moniz de Gandarei) who broke down the doors of the medieval city of Santarém with an axe during the conquest of Santarém.

== Family Relationships ==
He was the son of the knight Pedro Mendes de Gandarei and Elvira Martins de Riba de Vizela. He married Maria Pires Moniz ou de Cabreira, daughter of Pedro Moniz, granddaughter of D. Maria Moniz de Ribeira and for this, the great-granddaughter of Monio Osórez de Cabrera and his wife Maria Nunes de Grijó, who had:

- Martim Martins Machado, married Loba Gomes de Pombeiro

== Bibliography ==
- Felgueiras Gaio, Manuel José da Costa (1939). Nobiliário das Famílias de Portugal XIX (Braga: Carvalhos de Basto). OCLC 40553228.
- Sotto Mayor Pizarro, José Augusto (1987). Os Patronos do Mosteiro de Grijó. ISBN 978-0883-1886-37.
