= Muniz =

Muniz or Muñiz may refer to:

== Places ==
- Muñiz, Buenos Aires, a district in San Miguel Partido, in Argentina

== People ==
- Muniz (surname)
