= Phoebus of Lusignan =

Lord of Sidon

Phoebus of Lusignan (died after July 1485 in Rome) (also called Febo or Febos in Portuguese) was a titular Marshal of Armenia and also titular lord of Sidon.

== Biography ==
Phoebus was the illegitimate son of Peter of Lusignan, titular Count of Tripoli. His father was the grandson of John of Lusignan and second wife Alice of Ibelin. Phoebus was legitimized by Pope Martin V in 1428, along with his cousin Guy, illegitimate son of King Janus of Cyprus.

Married to an unknown woman, they had:

- Hugh of Lusignan, Lord of Menico and Acaqui, was married first to Babin and then to Isabeau Placoton
- Eleanor, who married Soffredo Crispo (d. 1458), lord of Nisyros, and then Vasco Gil Moniz

Phoebus accompanied his cousin Queen Charlotte, when she was deposed by her brother, into exile and died there.

== Sources ==
- Coureas, Nicholas (2025). "The Hospitallers and the burgesses of Rhodes in the 14th and 15th centuries". In Vidal, Clara Almagro; Buttigieg, Emanuel (eds.). The Military Orders In a Wider World. Vol. VIII. Routledge. pp. 120–133.
