= Peter of Lusignan =

Regent of the Kingdom of Cyprus and Count of Tripoli

Peter of Lusignan (French: Pierre de Lusignan); died 10 February 1451) was a regent of the Kingdom of Cyprus and titular Count of Tripoli. He was the second son of James of Lusignan, titular Count of Tripoli, and his wife and cousin Mary called Mariette (wrongly called Margaret) of Lusignan.

== Life ==
Besides being regent of Cyprus, titular Marshal or titular Seneschal of Tripoli and titular Count of Tripoli, he was also titular Constable and titular Seneschal of Jerusalem.

== Marriage and issue ==
In c. 1415 Peter married his cousin Isabella of Lusignan, Princess of Cyprus, daughter of James I of Lusignan, King of Cyprus, and wife Helvis of Brunswick-Grubenhagen, without issue.

He had an illegitimate son:

- Phoebus of Lusignan, titular Marshal of Armenia and titular Lord of Sidon

== Sources ==
- Meyer Setton, Kenneth (1976). The Papacy and the Levant, 1204-1571: The thirteenth and fourteenth centuries. American Philosophical Society. ISBN 9780871691149.
- L. de Mas Latrie, "Généalogie des rois de Chypre"
