= Garcia Moniz =

Portuguese nobleman

Garcia Moniz was a Portuguese nobleman.

== Life ==
He was the eldest son of Rui Gil Moniz and wife Filipa de Almada.

He held the office of his father of Treasurer of the Casa da Moeda of Lisbon and was a Commander of Nossa Senhora da Conceição of Lisbon, Fidalgo of the Royal Household of King John III of Portugal.

== Marriages and issue ==
He married firstly Brites Pereira, daughter of the Licentiate Luís Esteves da Veiga Lobo, Over Judge of the House of the Civil, and wife, without issue, and married secondly Genebra ..., daughter of Cristóvão Juzarte, from Azinhaga, and wife, without issue, and had a bastard daughter:

- Margarida or Madalena Moniz, the daughter of a tarnished woman, "who was a cow" and married lowerly, wife of a mechanical officer named Pero Fernandes

== Sources ==
- Manuel João da Costa Felgueiras Gaio, "Nobiliário das Famílias de Portugal", Tomo Vigésimo Primeiro, Título de Monizes, § 17, § 18 e § 19
- Various Authors, "Armorial Lusitano", Lisbon, 1961, pp. 370–372
- Dom Augusto Romano Sanches de Baena e Farinha de Almeida Portugal Sousa e Silva, 1.º Visconde de Sanches de Baena, "Archivo Heraldico-Genealógico", Lisbon, 1872, Volume II, p. CXV
- Cristóvão Alão de Morais, "Pedatura Lusitana", Volume I (reformulated edition), pp. 668–670
