= Nuno =

Nuno can refer to

- Nuno (given name), including a list of people with the given name Nuno
- Nuño (given name), including a list of people with the given name Nuño
- Nuno, meaning "ancestor" in Philippine languages, usually in reference to ancestral spirits or spirits of the dead
  - Nuno sa punso, a nature spirit (anito) of anthills with the appearance of an old man in Philippine folklore
- Nuno felting, a fabric felting technique
