= Conquest of Santarém =

1147 event of the Portuguese Reconquista

- Part of the Portuguese Reconquista
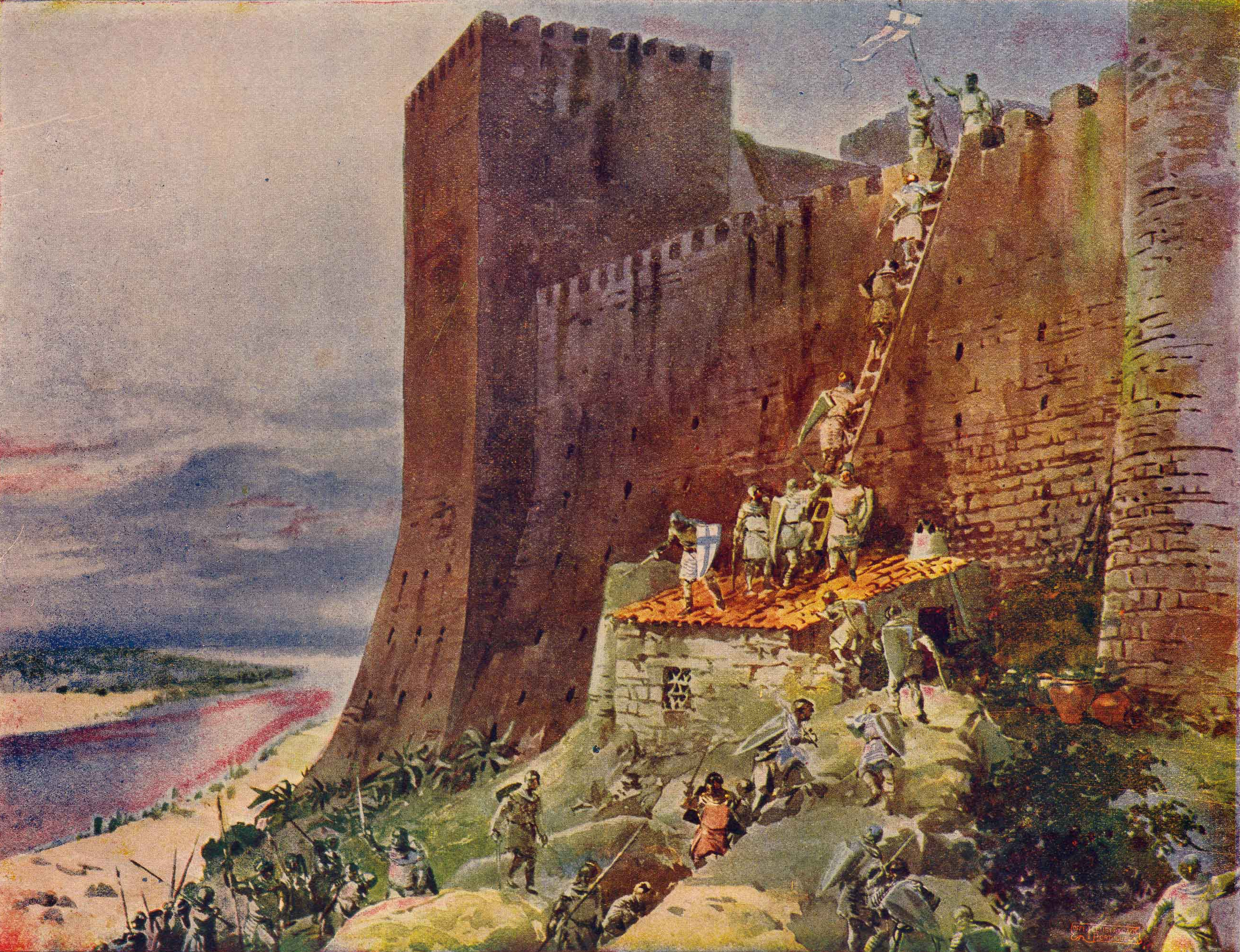
- The Conquest of Santarém by Alfredo Roque Gameiro
Date	15 March 1147
Location	Santarém, Portugal
Result	Portuguese victory

Belligerents
Kingdom of Portugal	Almoravid Dynasty

Commanders and leaders
Afonso I of Portugal	Auzary, governor of Shantarin

Strength
250 knights	Unknown

Casualties and losses
Unknown	Very high

The conquest of Santarém took place on 15 March 1147, when the troops of the Kingdom of Portugal under the leadership of Afonso I of Portugal captured the Almoravid city of Santarém (at the time called Shantarin).

== Prelude ==
On 10 March 1147, King Afonso I of Portugal departed from Coimbra with 250 of his best knights intending to capture the Moorish city of Santarém, a goal that he had previously failed to achieve. The conquest of Santarém was of vital importance to Afonso's strategy; its possession would mean the end of the frequent Moorish attacks on Leiria and would also allow a future attack on Lisbon.

The plan now was to attack the city during the night under cover of darkness, in order to catch the Moorish garrison by surprise. King Afonso had previously sent the Portuguese Mem Ramires to Santarém disguised as a businessman, in order to secretly study the city for the conquest.

After the first day of the journey from Coimbra to Santarém, King Afonso I sent an emissary to Santarém announcing to the Moors that the truce had ended, for which three days' notice was required.

== Fall of Santarém ==
On the night of 14 March, King Afonso and his army arrived at Santarém and hid ladders in the fields. Before dawn the next morning, 25 knights scaled the walls, killed the Moorish sentries and forced their way to the gate, allowing the main Portuguese army to enter the city. Awakened by the screams of their sentries, the Moors ran from all sides to face the Portuguese attackers in the streets, offering very strong resistance, but ended up being defeated and slaughtered.

By morning the conquest was already complete and Santarém became part of the recently formed Kingdom of Portugal.

One of the attacking knights was Mem Moniz de Gandarei (grandfather of Portuguese politician Martim Machado Pires), who was said to have broken down the city doors with an axe.

== Aftermath ==
After the conquest of Santarém, Afonso I of Portugal turned his attention to the important Moorish city of Lisbon, which he would conquer in October with the help of a crusader fleet of the Second Crusade who stopped in Portugal while on course to the Holy Land.

The earliest and most detailed source for the conquest of Santarém is the De expugnatione Scalabis.

In José Saramago's 1998 novel, The History of the Siege of Lisbon, the character Mogueime participates in a fictionalized version of the Conquest of Santarém, and is credited with hoisting Mem Ramirez on his shoulders while climbing over the wall. A point of discussion in the book is who climbed on whose shoulders, as a commentary on class.

== See also ==
- Siege of Santarém (1184)
- Portugal in the Middle Ages
- Portugal in the Reconquista
- Timeline of Portuguese history (First Dynasty)
