= Jerónimo Moniz =

Portuguese nobleman

Jerónimo Moniz was a Portuguese nobleman.

== Life ==
He was the eldest son of Febo Moniz de Lusignan and wife Catarina or Maria da Cunha.

Like his father, he was also a Reposteiro-Mór (major footman at the royal household encharged with drawing and undrawing the curtains and hangings and treasurer of the store-house for furniture) of the same King Manuel I of Portugal.

== Marriage and issue ==
He married Violante da Silva, daughter of João de Saldanha, Vedor of Queens Maria of Aragon and Eleanor of Austria, wives of King Manuel I of Portugal, and later of the Empress Isabella of Portugal, and wife Dona Joana de Lima of the Viscounts of Vila Nova de Cerveira. He had four children:

- João Moniz, unmarried and without issue
- Febo Moniz
- António Moniz, who withdrew as a Priest of the Company of Jesus
- Leonor, a Nun

== Sources ==
- Manuel João da Costa Felgueiras Gaio, "Nobiliário das Famílias de Portugal", Tomo Vigésimo Primeiro, Título de Monizes, § 17, § 18 e § 19
- Various Authors, "Armorial Lusitano", Lisbon, 1961, pp. 370–372
- Dom Augusto Romano Sanches de Baena e Farinha de Almeida Portugal Sousa e Silva, 1.º Visconde de Sanches de Baena, "Archivo Heraldico-Genealógico", Lisbon, 1872, Volume II, p. CXV
- Cristóvão Alão de Morais, "Pedatura Lusitana", Volume I (reformulated edition), pp. 668–670
