= Vasco Gil Moniz =

Portuguese noble

Vasco Gil Moniz (formerly Vasco Gil) (died Lisbon, 1497) was a Portuguese nobleman.

== Life ==
Vasco was the second son of Gil Aires and Leonor Rodrigues. He was a vedor of Infante Peter, Duke of Coimbra, son of King John I of Portugal.

== Marriages and issue ==
Vasco married firstly Catarina Fernandes, daughter of Fernão Rodrigues.

Vasco married secondly before 1459 Eléonore de Lusignan, daughter of Phoebus de Lusignan, titular Marshal of Armenia and titular Lord of Sidon. Vasco met her when he went to Cyprus in the company of Infante John of Portugal who was marrying Charlotte of Cyprus.

They had:

- Febo Moniz de Lusignan
- Guiomar Moniz
- Pedro Álvares Moniz.
