= Nuno (given name) =

- Pronunciation: [ˈnunu]
- Gender: Male

Origin
- Origin: Latin
- Meaning: Grandfather or squire

Nuno is a Portuguese male name, derived either from Latin nunnus 'grandfather' or nonnus 'chamberlain, squire'. It is quite popular in the Portuguese-speaking countries and communities. Its Spanish equivalent is Nuño. There is also a female variant in both Portuguese and Spanish: Nuna and Nuña respectively.

The patronymic from Nuno is Portuguese Nunes and Spanish Núñez.

It may refer to:

== Football players ==
- Nuno Afonso (born 1974), Portuguese football player (defender)
- Nuno Assis (born 1977), Portuguese football player (midfielder)
- Nuno André Coelho (born 1986), Portuguese football player (defender)
- Nuno Miguel Prata Coelho (born 1987), Portuguese football player (midfielder/defender)
- Nuno Diogo (born 1981), Portuguese football player (defender)
- Nuno Espírito Santo (born 1974), Portuguese football player (goalkeeper) and manager
- Nuno Frechaut (born 1977), Portuguese football player (midfielder/defender)
- Nuno Gomes (born 1976), Portuguese football player (forward)
- Nuno Manta Santos (born 1978), Portuguese football player (midfielder) and manager
- Nuno Piloto (born 1982), Portuguese football player (midfielder)
- Nuno Filipe Martins Rodrigues (born 1979), Portuguese football player (defender)
- Nuno Santos (disambiguation), several Portuguese football players
- Nuno Tavares (born 2000), Portuguese football player (defender)
- Nuno Valente (born 1974), Portuguese football player (defender)

== Portuguese nobility ==
- Nuno Álvares Pereira (1360–1431), Constable of Portugal and general, later canonised
- Nuno I Álvares Pereira de Melo (1638–1725), 1st Duke of Cadaval
- Nuno II Álvares Pereira de Melo (1741–1771), 4th Duke of Cadaval
- Nuno III Álvares Pereira de Melo (1799–1837), 6th Duke of Cadaval
- Nuno IV Álvares Pereira de Melo (1888–1935), 9th Duke of Cadaval
- Nuno Alvites (fl. 1017–1028), count of Portugal
- Duarte Nuno, Duke of Braganza (1907–1976), claimant to the throne of Portugal
- Nuno José Severo de Mendoça Rolim de Moura Barreto, 1st Duke of Loulé (1804–1875), three-time prime minister of Portugal

== Other people ==
- Nuno Bettencourt (born 1966), Portuguese-American musician
- Nuno Canavarro (born 1962), Portuguese composer
- Nuno da Cunha (1487–1539), Governor of Portuguese India
- Nuno Gonçalves, 15th-century Portuguese court painter
- Nuno Leal Maia (born 1947), Brazilian actor
- Nuno Lopes (born 1978), Portuguese actor
- Nuno Markl (born 1971), Portuguese comedian, writer, radio host, television host, voice actor and screenwriter
- Nuno Mendes (disambiguation), several people
- Nuno Pereira (musician) (born 1979), entertainer, lead singer
- Nuno Pinheiro (born 1977), Portuguese graphic designer and illustrator
- Nuno Pinheiro (born 1984), Portuguese volleyball player
- Nuno Portas (1934–2025), Portuguese architect
- Nuno Resende (born 1973), Portuguese singer
- Nuno Ribeiro (born 1977), Portuguese road bicycle racer
- Nuno Roque, Portuguese artist, actor, singer-songwriter and director
- Nuno Tristão, 15th-century Portuguese explorer
- Nuno Viegas (born 1977), former architect, design manager in London (from Loures, Lisbon)
- Nuno Villafane (born 2007), Spanish trampolinist

== See also ==
- Nuno (disambiguation)
- Nuño
- Neno (name)
- Niño (name)
- Nino (name)
