= Pedro Moniz da Silva =

Portuguese nobleman

Pedro or Pero Moniz da Silva was a Portuguese nobleman.

== Life ==
He was the eldest son of Diogo Gil Moniz and his wife Leonor da Silva, of the Lords of a Chamusca.

For some time he was a Reposteiro-Mór (major footman at the royal household encharged with drawing and undrawing the curtains and hangings and treasurer of the store-house for furniture) of King Manuel I of Portugal, he had a Command at the Order of Christ and later was the Mordomo-Mór (Lord Chamberlain or Master Majordomo) of the Cardinal Henry, King of Portugal.

== Marriages and issue ==
He married firstly Brites ... (daughter of Pedro Botelho, Judge of the Customs of Lisbon, and wife), with whom he never had a life and without issue, and after her first wife's death secondly Isabel Henriques (daughter of Francisco de Miranda, from Évora, and wife) and had issue, two sons and one daughter by second marriage and one illegitimate son, or one son and one daughter by second marriage and two illegitimate sons:

- Bernardo Moniz or Moniz da Silva, had the Command of his father in the Order of Christ, and had for an abode as a Squire 2230 réis a month and 1 alqueire (between 13 and 22 litres) of barley a day, married his relative Lourença or Lucrécia de Vilhena (daughter of Francisco da Silva of the Lords of a Chamusca) and wife, without issue, had four bastard children, or his first two were by marriage:
  - Pedro Moniz or Pero Moniz da Silva, died in Africa, at the Battle of Alcácer Quibir, on 4 August 1578
  - Vitória or Victória, a Dame of the Royal Palace of Maria of Portugal, Duchess of Viseu and who died unmarried and without issue
  - António of St. Thomas, a Hieronymite monk of Tomar, one of the greatest men of his time
  - Isabel das Montanhas, a nun at Santa Iria of Tomar
- Maria, a nun at Santa Iria of Tomar
- (illegitimate) João da Silva who some say died unmarried and without issue, others that he married Margarida de Gouveia and had:
  - Pedro
- (illegitimate?) Teotónio Moniz, a friar, Catholic priest and a great Preacher

His daughter Maria Pires Moniz ou de Cabreira married to Martim Machado Pires, medieval Portuguese politician and alcaide of the Castle of Lanhoso.

== Sources ==
- Manuel João da Costa Felgueiras Gaio, "Nobiliário das Famílias de Portugal", Tomo Vigésimo Primeiro, Título de Monizes, § 17, § 18 e § 19
- Various Authors, "Armorial Lusitano", Lisbon, 1961, pp. 370-372
- Dom Augusto Romano Sanches de Baena e Farinha de Almeida Portugal Sousa e Silva, 1.º Visconde de Sanches de Baena, "Archivo Heraldico-Genealógico", Lisbon, 1872, Volume II, p. CXV
- Cristóvão Alão de Morais, "Pedatura Lusitana", Volume I (reformulated edition), pp. 668-670
