= Nuño González de Lara =

Nuño González de Lara may refer to:.

- Nuño González de Lara (died 1275), nicknamed el Bueno
- Nuño González de Lara (died 1291), son of the preceding
- Nuño González de Lara (died 1296), nephew of the preceding
