= Filipa de Almada =

Portuguese poet and noblewoman

Filipa de Almada (1453-1497 CE) was a Portuguese poet and noblewoman.

Almada is known to have lived and written during the reigns of kings Alfonso V and John II of Portugal. She was the granddaughter of Philippa of Lancaster, queen of Portugal. Almada married Rui Moniz, a fellow-poet, and they had a son together, Francisco de Sousa Mancias.

In the royal court of the time, poetry was a popular skill and pastime; courtiers would frequently participate in poetry competitions. Almada was noted for her skill, and her poetry was included in the 1516 songbook Cancioneiro Geral anthologized by Garcia de Resende.

== Bibliography ==
- "Almada, Filipa de (fl. 15th c.)." In Women in World History: A Biographical Encyclopedia, edited by Anne Commire, 244. Vol. 1. Detroit, MI: Yorkin Publications, 2002. Print.
- Resende, Garcia de. Cancioneiro Geral. [Lisboa: Hermã de Cãpos,1516.] Biblioteca nacional de Portugal.
- Pious, Samantha (translator). "What I cannot recover ..." Volume Poetry 2, no. 3. Online.
