= Muniz (surname) =

Muniz or Muñiz is a surname, primarily in the Spanish language, where it is spelled Muñiz (Muniz is an American or Portuguese variant). It may refer to:

- Carlos Muñiz (born 1981), American baseball player
- Carlos Muniz (politician) (born 2001), Brazilian politician
- Frankie Muniz (born 1985), American actor
- João Muniz (born 2005), Portuguese footballer
- Júlio César de Paula Muniz Júnior (born 1988), Brazilian football player
- Manny Muñiz (born 1947), Puerto Rican baseball player
- Marco Antonio Muñiz (born 1933), Mexican singer
- Marc Anthony (born 1968), Puerto Rican singer (born Marco Antonio Muñiz)
- Rafo Muñiz (born 1956), Puerto Rican actor, director, & producer
- Suzane Louise Magnani Muniz (born 1983), Brazilian murderer
- Tomás Muñiz (1900–1963), Puerto Rican radio and television producer
- Tommy Muñiz (1922–2009), Puerto Rican comedian
- Vik Muniz (born 1961), Brazilian avant-garde artist

== See also ==
- Moniz
- Muñoz
