= Nuño Álvarez =

Nuño Álvarez may refer to:

- Nuño Álvarez de Carazo (fl. 1028–54), Castilian diplomat
- Nuno Álvares Pereira (1360–1431), Portuguese general
