= Matt Moniz =

American mountaineer

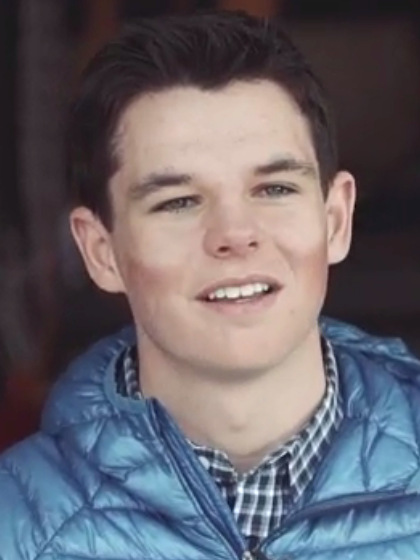
Matthew Moniz in June 2015

Matt Moniz (born February 1998) is an American mountaineer and speaker noted for his ascents of 8,000 meter peaks and several of the Seven Summits.

== Early climbs ==
In 2007, Moniz climbed to the Mount Everest Base Camp. It was Moniz's first experience with hiking and scaling a mountain. In 2008, following the Nepal trek Moniz summited Mount Elbrus, the highest peak in Europe. Moniz then climbed to the summit of Kilimanjaro with his twin sister Kaylee at the age of 10, accompanied by their parents. He also climbed to the summit of Aconcagua, the highest summit in the Americas. He was the youngest person to ever reach the summit.

In 2009, Moniz began climbing to raise money for a friend who suffers from Pulmonary arterial hypertension (PAH). He started with a campaign to climb 14 of Colorado's 14,000-foot peaks in 14 days and completed the task in only eight days. In total he was able to raise over $20,000. This accomplishment was entered into the Congressional Record during a session of the United States Congress on December 11, 2009, by US Congressman Jim Langevin.

In August 2011, Moniz completed a triple climb in Bolivia, summiting Illimani (21,122 ft; 6,438 m), Huayna Potosi (19,974 ft; 6,088 m) and Pequeno Alpamayo (17,618 ft; 5,370 m) with his father.

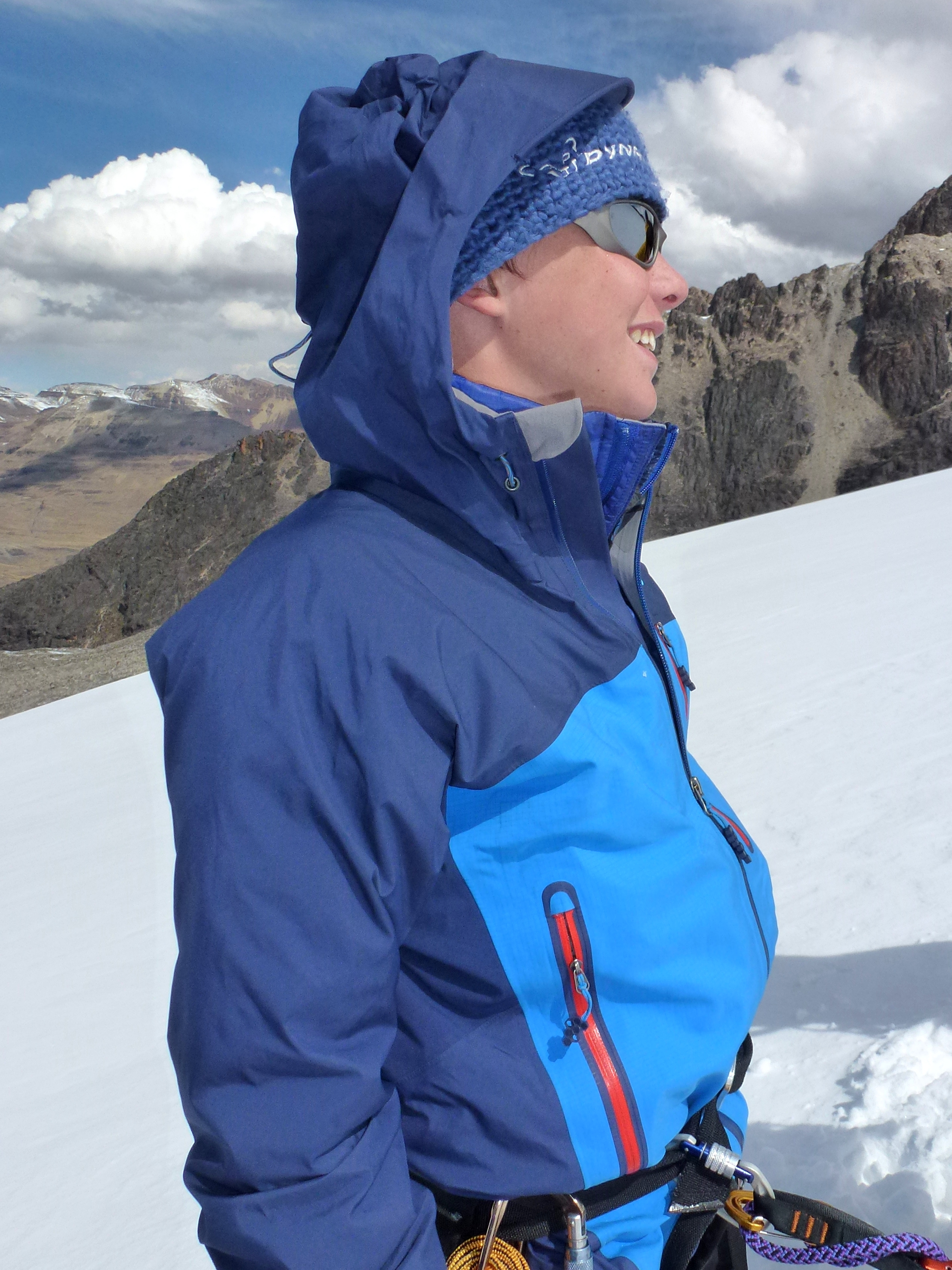
Matt Moniz on Bolivia's 21,122 ft Illimani in August 2011

== 50 peaks in 43 days ==
Moniz was named a 2010 Adventurer of the Year by National Geographic Magazine, after summiting the highest points in all 50 US states in only 43 days, at the age of 12. It was the fastest time in which the achievement had ever been done (a record he holds with his father Michael Moniz), with an exact time of 43 days, 3 hours, 51 minutes and 9 seconds. Moniz is also the youngest climber to reach all 50 high points and the youngest recipient of an Adventurer of the Year award. Moniz authored High Points, a Ladders Reading/Language Arts 4 book with National Geographic Learning on his 50 high points accomplishment. Moniz has made presentations to organizations including the Business Innovation Factory and for a crowd of more than 25,000 in New York's Central Park on behalf of the organization Outdoor Nation.

== Pushing Above the High Point ==
Moniz was the focus of the 2011 short documentary Pushing Above the Highpoint'', about his attempt to climb to the highpoint of every state in less than 50 days to raise awareness for PAH. The film was the winner of the 2012 Seven Summits award at the Mountain Film Awards, the second place Short Documentary winner at the All Sports Los Angeles Film Festival and an official selection at the Vail Film Festival, Frozen River Film Festival, and Arnold Sports Film Festival.

== 8,000 meter peaks ==
In 2014 Moniz's father, Michael Moniz, announced a spring expedition to attempt back-to-back-to-back summits of three 8,000-meter peaks, Cho Oyu, Mount Everest, and Lhotse, in less than 15 days. The expedition was dubbed "The Triple 8" and the team originally planned a first-ever ski descent of the Lhotse Couloir. The team was on Cho Oyu during the 16 April avalanche on Mount Everest and, out of respect for the Sherpas who lost their lives, reevaluated their plans. On 17 May Moniz successfully summited Cho Oyu. On 24 May 2014, Moniz, his climbing partner Willie Benegas and a small team of Sherpas successfully summited Makalu Moniz is the 14th American and youngest climber to summit Makalu.

== 2015 Everest Expedition and avalanche ==
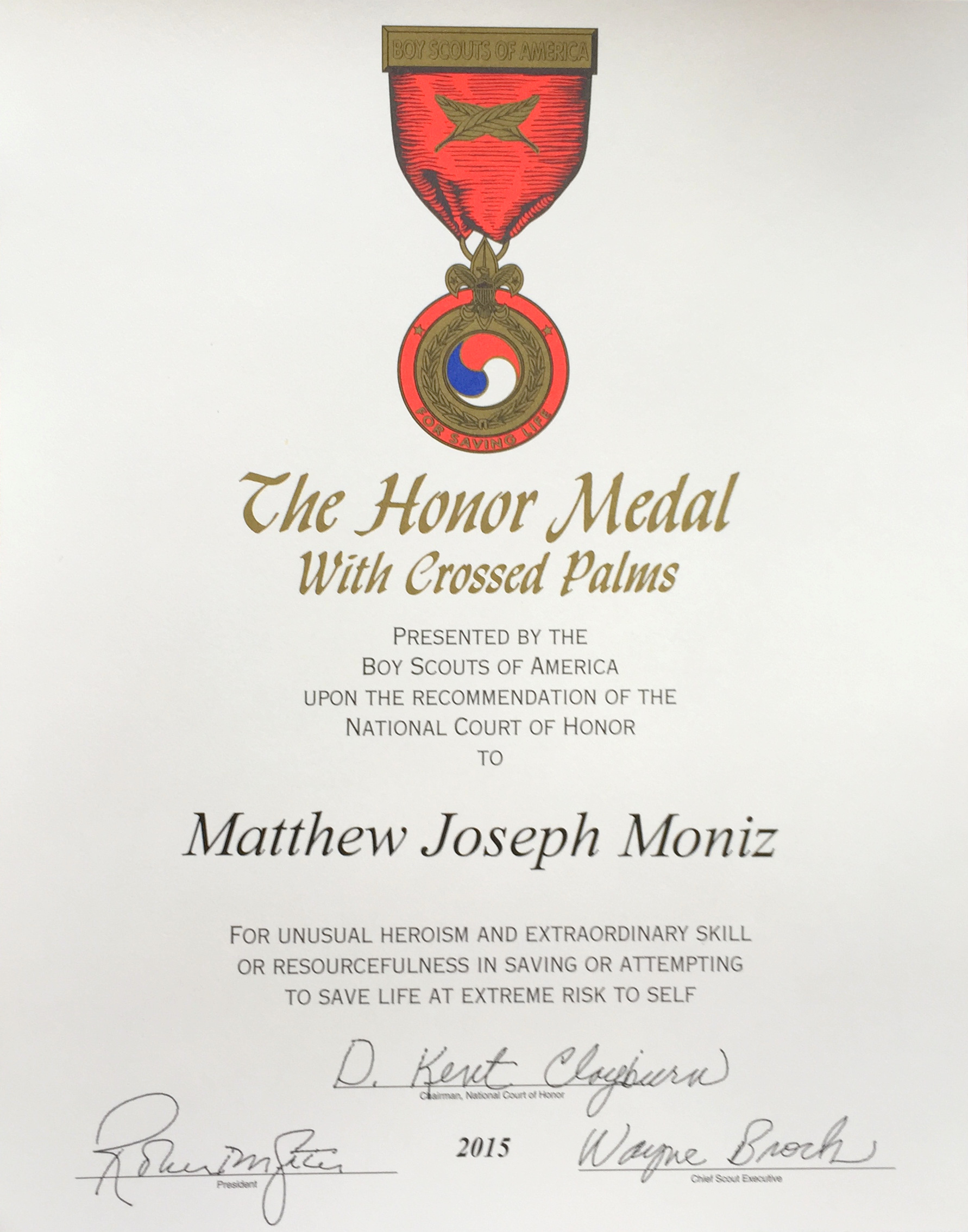
For his actions in Nepal, Moniz received the Honor Medal with Crossed Palms from the Boy Scouts of America

In April 2015, Moniz and his team left for Nepal for a third expedition: an anticipated summit of Mount Everest followed by a summit of Lhotse and then an attempt to ski the Lhotse Couloir. As they approached Mount Everest on April 25, 2015, an earthquake struck Nepal and triggered an avalanche from Pumori into Everest Base Camp. Moniz took cover behind a boulder as a 200 mph powder blast hit the camp. At least 22 people were killed and many injured. Moniz immediately began helping the wounded and with other rescue efforts. For his actions, Moniz received the Boy Scouts of America's highest award for lifesaving – The Honor Medal with Crossed Palms.

After the initial earthquake Moniz remained in Nepal to assist with rebuilding efforts. He and his climbing partner Willie Benegas raised enough funds to hire over 800 porters to carry nearly 18 metric tons of World Food Programme supplies to the people of the devastated village of Laprak. Moniz stayed in Nepal for a month working with a team of international doctors and climbers to care for the injured and build temporary schools and homes in the remote Himalayan mountains.

== 2018 Mount Everest and Lhotse summits ==
On May 20, 2018, Moniz and Benegas reached the summit of Mount Everest. The weather window was solid (dry, low wind speeds) and the team moved quickly. While on the summit, Moniz and his team unfurled the Navy's 7th Fleet flag - a chance meeting with Naval top officers in 2016 inspired the Navy officers to send a signed flag with the team on the expedition. Moniz stated that he was proud to honor the service and sacrifice of the Navy by flying the flag at the highest point on Earth. After the Everest summit, the team regrouped and used their acclimatization to become the fourth team to summit Everest and Lhotse within twenty-four hours during the 2018 season.

== 2018 Everest Twin Study ==
As part of the 2018 Everest/Lhotse summit expedition, Moniz and Benegas announced that in cooperation with Dr. Christopher Mason, an associate professor at Weill Cornell Medicine in New York City and leader of the NASA gene expression study, they will be the lead subjects in the Everest Twin Study. Modeled after the Mason Lab's recent ground-breaking NASA Twin Study, Moniz and Benegas will be collecting blood samples to compare with their respective twin siblings to research how they genomically adapt to their near-space mission. The goal of the study was to sequence DNA and RNA from the climbers' white blood cells to discover possible changes in gene expression.

== Recognition ==
In August 2015, Moniz was recognized in front of over 73,000 fans as a Broncos Country Hero at the preseason Denver Broncos versus San Francisco 49ers game. In March 2015, he was honored at the Boulder Citizens' Dinner as the 2015 Boulder Distinguished Eagle Scout. In February 2015, Moniz was presented with the 2015 Outdoor Inspiration Award at the Outdoor Retailer Winter Market. While in middle school, Moniz received the Winning Attitude award given by CenturyLink, Root Sports and the University of Colorado. The winner is selected from a pool of written essays explaining how their attitude has made a difference in the community.

== World's Toughest Race: Eco-Challenge Fiji ==
In August 2020, Moniz competed with Team Eagle Scouts in the World's Toughest Race: Eco-Challenge Fiji, a reality competition series which aired on Amazon Prime. The course covered over 617 km with an eleven-day cut off – teams were only equipped with a map and a compass. The team raced through five stages including legs on the ocean, through the jungle, biking and a river run, trekking through the highlands and paddleboarding for the final island leg. Team Eagle Scouts finished in 43rd place and was one of just 11 US teams to finish.

== Education ==
Moniz graduated from Dartmouth College in Hanover, NH in 2020. He received his master's degree from Georgetown University in 2022.

== See also ==
- Jordan Romero, summited Mount Everest at 13
- Malavath Purna, summited Mount Everest at 13
- Tyler Armstrong
