= Gil Aires =

Portuguese nobleman

- Died: 1437
- Occupation: Nobleman

Gil Aires (c. 1370 – 1437) was a Portuguese nobleman.

== Life ==
He was an honoured man and a much honoured Knight at the time of King John I of Portugal and an Escrivão da Puridade (Notary/Registrar of the Purity/Secret, furthermore, a Secretary) of the 2nd Constable of Portugal Nuno Álvares Pereira, and some say also his relative, in 1422, and Vedor (Overseer) of the things belonging to Ceuta in 1423.

He was perhaps born into the Moniz noble family. His connection to the main branch is, however, currently unknown. Barreiros, a Genealogist, does not nominate him, in his Livro Ms., more than by Gil Aires, and says at the margins these words: And of Maria Trabuca and of one from Alegrete, who seems they want to say he was their son; and then, after nominating his children below, he says so: All of these were called themselves Moniz, after their father was put into honour.; and says another information he was born in Alegrete, the one in Coruche or in Portalegre, son of a man who lived at the same village.

He was buried at his Chapel of Our Lady of Piety or of the Prant of the Carmo Convent, in Lisbon, in a Chapel that had been given to him by the Constable for his burial place, and there he nominates himself Escrivão da Puridade do Condestável.

== Marriage and issue ==
He married Leonor Rodrigues and had six children, three sons and three daughters:

- Vasco Gil Moniz
- Leonor Gil Moniz (or Leonor Moniz and formerly Leonor Gil), married as his second wife to Fernão de Sousa, o Labruja, son of João de Sousa and wife Beatriz de Almeida and widow with female issue of Maria Rodrigues de Castelo-Branco, and had extant issue
- Diogo Gil Moniz
- Rui Gil Moniz
- Guiomar Gil Moniz (formerly Guiomar Gil)
- Isabel Moniz (or Isabel Gil Moniz and formerly Isabel Gil), wife of Bartolomeu Perestrelo, mother of Filipa Moniz and mother-in-law of Christopher Columbus.

== Sources ==
- Manuel João da Costa Felgueiras Gaio, "Nobiliário das Famílias de Portugal", Tomo Vigésimo Primeiro, Título de Monizes, § 17, § 18 e § 19
- Various Authors, "Armorial Lusitano", Lisbon, 1961, pp. 370–372
- Dom Augusto Romano Sanches de Baena e Farinha de Almeida Portugal Sousa e Silva, 1.º Visconde de Sanches de Baena, "Archivo Heraldico-Genealógico", Lisbon, 1872, Volume II, p. CXV
- Cristóvão Alão de Morais, "Pedatura Lusitana", Volume I (reformulated edition), pp. 668–670
