= Nuño Gómez =

Coordinates: 40°07′N 4°37′W

- municipality
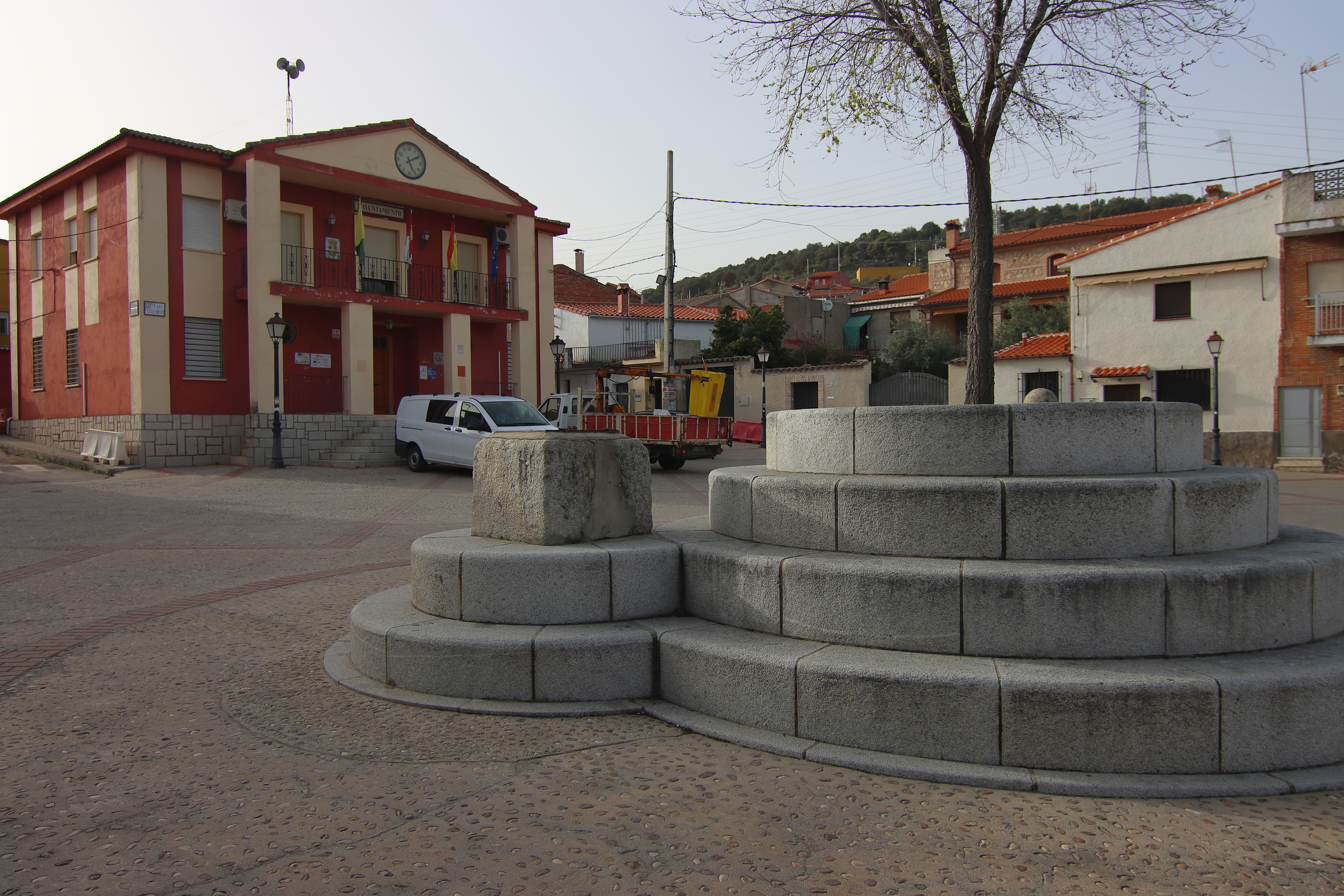
- Nuño Gómez Town Hall Square

- Flag Coat of arms
- Interactive map of Nuño Gómez
- Country: Spain
- Autonomous community: Castile-La Mancha
- Province: Toledo
- Municipality: Nuño Gómez

Area
  - Total: 17 km^{2} (6.6 sq mi)
- Elevation: 469 m (1,539 ft)

Population (2025-01-01)
  - Total: 178
  - Density: 10/km^{2} (27/sq mi)
- Time zone: UTC+1 (CET)
  - Summer (DST): UTC+2 (CEST)

Nuño Gómez is a municipality located in the province of Toledo, Castile-La Mancha, Spain. According to the 2006 census (INE), the municipality has a population of 198 inhabitants.
