= Michael Moniz =

Michael Moniz of Boulder, Colorado, is an American business executive and high-altitude mountaineer.

== Business career ==
Mike Moniz co-founded the online videogame company VR-1, Inc in 1993, was named president in 1996 and made CEO in 1999. In a 1998 interview about the prospects of online gaming, Moniz stated that the revenue model of the industry needed to change in order to compete with games made for videogame consoles. The company changed its name to Circadence in 2000 and Moniz remained CEO as the company transitioned into the WAN and network optimization space. Under Moniz, the company was ranked first in the 2008 Deloitte Fast 50. Moniz is also a Managing Director of the Paladin Capital Group, a multi-stage private equity firm which he co-founded in 2001. His view on executive leadership in business was reported on by Debra Benton in her book How to Act Like a CEO. He is on the Board of Directors for the Outdoor Foundation, on the Advisory Board of the dZi Foundation, the Board of Trustees for The Fund for Peace, the Board of Directors for ClearCube, and the Board of Directors for Northern Therapeutics. Additionally he has twice been a nominee for the Ernst & Young entrepreneur of the year award.

== Mountain climbing ==
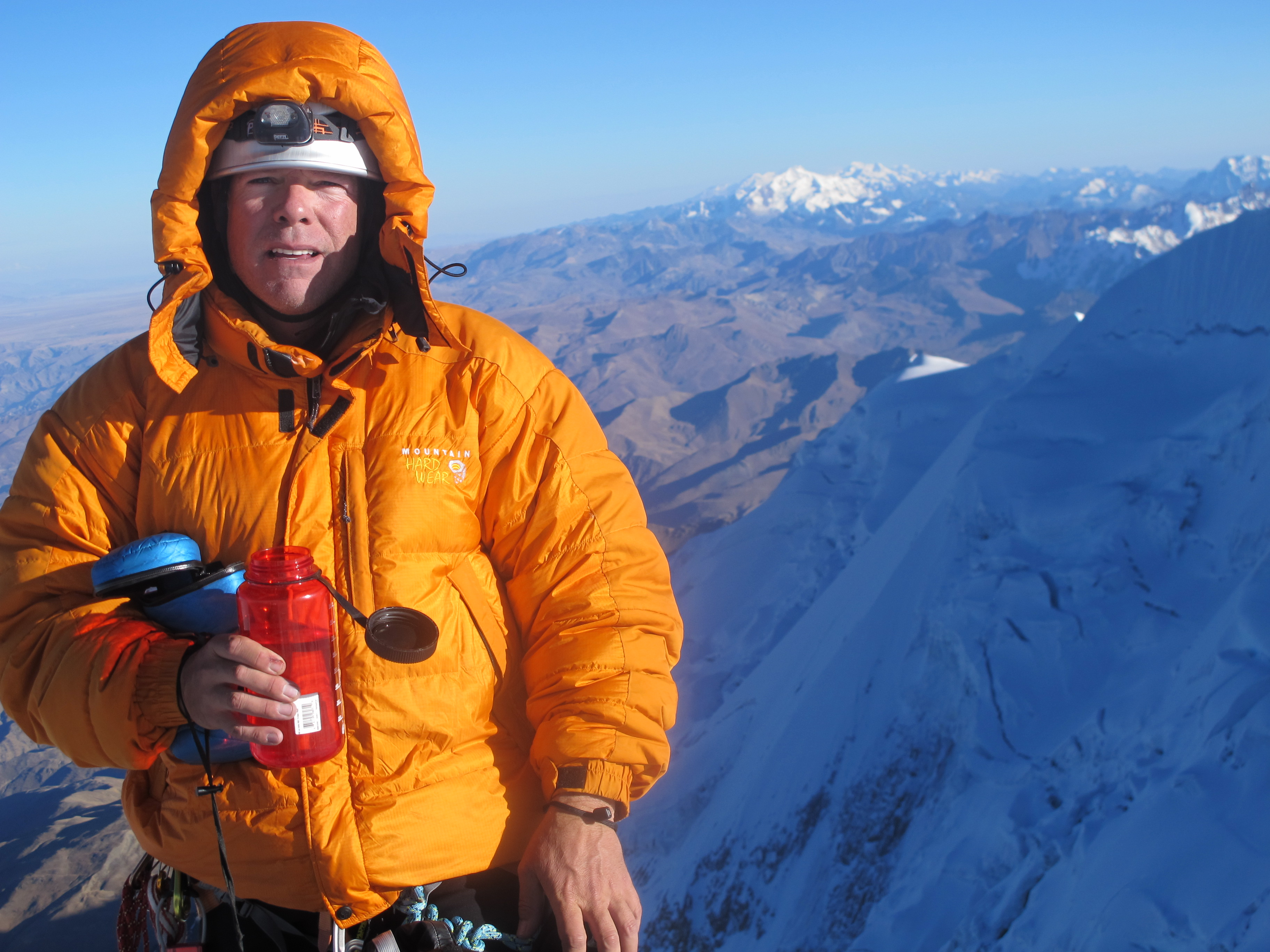
Michael Moniz at the summit of Mount Illimani in Bolivia

Moniz began mountain climbing in Colorado during the 1980s. In 2010 he set the speed record with his son Matt Moniz for the fastest summit of the highest 50 points in all 50 US states doing so in 43 days, 3 hours, 51 minutes and 9 seconds. In 2012 Moniz announced a Mount Everest summit bid and stated that before and after his climb, he would submit to a SPECT MRI scan to help research into the link between high altitude climbing and potential brain damage. The plan was to summit three different 8,000+ foot peaks within weeks of one another. That May, he successfully reached the summit of Mount Everest and Lhotse (the world's fourth highest mountain) within 24 hours of each other. Upon this ascent, Moniz had climbed four of the Seven Summits.

In 2014 Moniz again announced a spring expedition to attempt back-to-back-to-back summits of three 8,000-meter peaks, Cho Oyu, Everest, and Lhotse, in less than 15 days. The team originally planned a first-ever ski descent of the Lhotse Couloir. In May Moniz successfully summited Cho Oyu. The team changed their expedition plans after the April 16 Mount Everest avalanche claimed the lives of 16 Sherpa and shut down climbing on the south side, and instead sent a smaller group of climbers to summit Makalu.
