= Nuno Santos =

Nuno Santos may refer to:

- Nuno Santos (footballer, born 1973), Portuguese football goalkeeper
- Nuno Santos (footballer, born 1978), Portuguese football goalkeeper
- Nuno Santos (footballer, born 1980), Portuguese football forward
- Nuno Santos (footballer, born 1995), Portuguese football midfielder
- Nuno Santos (footballer, born 1999), Portuguese football midfielder

== See also ==
- Nuno Espírito Santo (born 1974), Portuguese football goalkeeper and manager
