= Diogo Gil Moniz =

Portuguese nobleman

Diogo Gil Moniz (formerly Diogo Gil) was a Portuguese nobleman.

== Life ==
He was the eldest son of Gil Aires and wife Leonor Rodrigues.

He was Vedor of the Fazenda of Infante Ferdinand, Duke of Viseu, brother of King Afonso V of Portugal and father of King Manuel I of Portugal.

== Marriage and issue ==
He married Leonor da Silva, daughter of Rui Gomes da Silva, of the Lords of a Chamusca, and wife Branca de Almeida, and had:

- Francisca Pereira or da Silva, wife of Dom Sancho de Noronha, 3rd Count of Odemira, and had extant issue
- Pedro or Pero Moniz da Silva
- António of St. Thomas, a Hieronymite monk, a reformer of the Monastery of Tomar

== Sources ==
- Manuel João da Costa Felgueiras Gaio, "Nobiliário das Famílias de Portugal", Tomo Vigésimo Primeiro, Título de Monizes, § 17, § 18 e § 19
- Various Authors, "Armorial Lusitano", Lisbon, 1961, pp. 370-372
- Dom Augusto Romano Sanches de Baena e Farinha de Almeida Portugal Sousa e Silva, 1.º Visconde de Sanches de Baena, "Archivo Heraldico-Genealógico", Lisbon, 1872, Volume II, p. CXV
- Cristóvão Alão de Morais, "Pedatura Lusitana", Volume I (reformulated edition), pp. 668-670
