= Febo Moniz de Lusignan =

Portuguese nobleman

Febo (or Febos) Moniz de Lusignan or simply Febo (or Febos) Moniz was a Portuguese nobleman.

He was one of three children of Vasco Gil Moniz and his second wife, Eléonore de Lusignan, Princess of Cyprus.

He was a Reposteiro-Mór (a major footman at the royal household encharged with drawing and undrawing the curtains and hangings and treasurer of the store-house for furniture) of King Manuel I of Portugal and a Fidalgo of his royal household and Alcaide-Mór of Arraiolos.

== Marriage and issue ==
He married Catarina or Maria da Cunha, daughter of Gonçalo Correia, third Lord of the Honour of Farelães, and wife Margarida de Prado, who was promised by King Manuel I of Portugal 6,000 crowns for the marriage, and had issue, three sons by marriage and one bastard son:

- Jerónimo Moniz
- António Moniz, died a child, young, unmarried
- Gil Aires Moniz, died a child, young, unmarried
- (bastard) Jerónimo Moniz, who was a Clergyman

== Sources ==
- Manuel João da Costa Felgueiras Gaio, "Nobiliário das Famílias de Portugal", Tomo Vigésimo Primeiro, Título de Monizes, § 17, § 18 e § 19
- Various Authors, "Armorial Lusitano", Lisbon, 1961, pp. 370–372
- Augusto Romano Sanches de Baena e Farinha de Almeida Portugal de Sousa e Silva, 1.º Visconde de Sanches de Baena, "Archivo Heraldico-Genealógico", Lisbon, 1872, Volume II, p. CXV
- Cristóvão Alão de Morais, "Pedatura Lusitana", Volume I (reformulated edition), pp. 668–670
