= Rui Gil Moniz =

Portuguese nobleman

Rui Gil Moniz (formerly Rui Gil) was a Portuguese nobleman.

== Life ==
He was a son of Gil Aires and wife Leonor Rodrigues.

He was a Treasurer of the Casa da Moeda of Lisbon.

== Marriage and issue ==
He married Filipa de Almada, daughter of João Vaz de Almada, Vedor of King Afonso V of Portugal, and wife Violante de Castro, and had:

- Garcia Moniz
- Francisco de Almada, Commander of Esgueira and / or Aguim in the Order of Christ, of the old ones who were unmarried, but had natural children
- Frei Nicolau Moniz, who was made himself a Friar of the Carmelites and then went out and became a Clergyman
- Leonor Moniz, second wife of Jorge de Sousa, without issue

== Sources ==
- Manuel João da Costa Felgueiras Gaio, "Nobiliário das Famílias de Portugal", Tomo Vigésimo Primeiro, Título de Monizes, § 17, § 18 e § 19
- Various Authors, "Armorial Lusitano", Lisbon, 1961, pp. 370-372
- Dom Augusto Romano Sanches de Baena e Farinha de Almeida Portugal Sousa e Silva, 1.º Visconde de Sanches de Baena, "Archivo Heraldico-Genealógico", Lisbon, 1872, Volume II, p. CXV
- Cristóvão Alão de Morais, "Pedatura Lusitana", Volume I (reformulated edition), pp. 668-670
