= Castle of Lanhoso =

Medieval castle in Póvoa de Lanhoso, Braga, Portugal

- Castelo de Lanhoso
- Braga, Cávado, Norte in Portugal
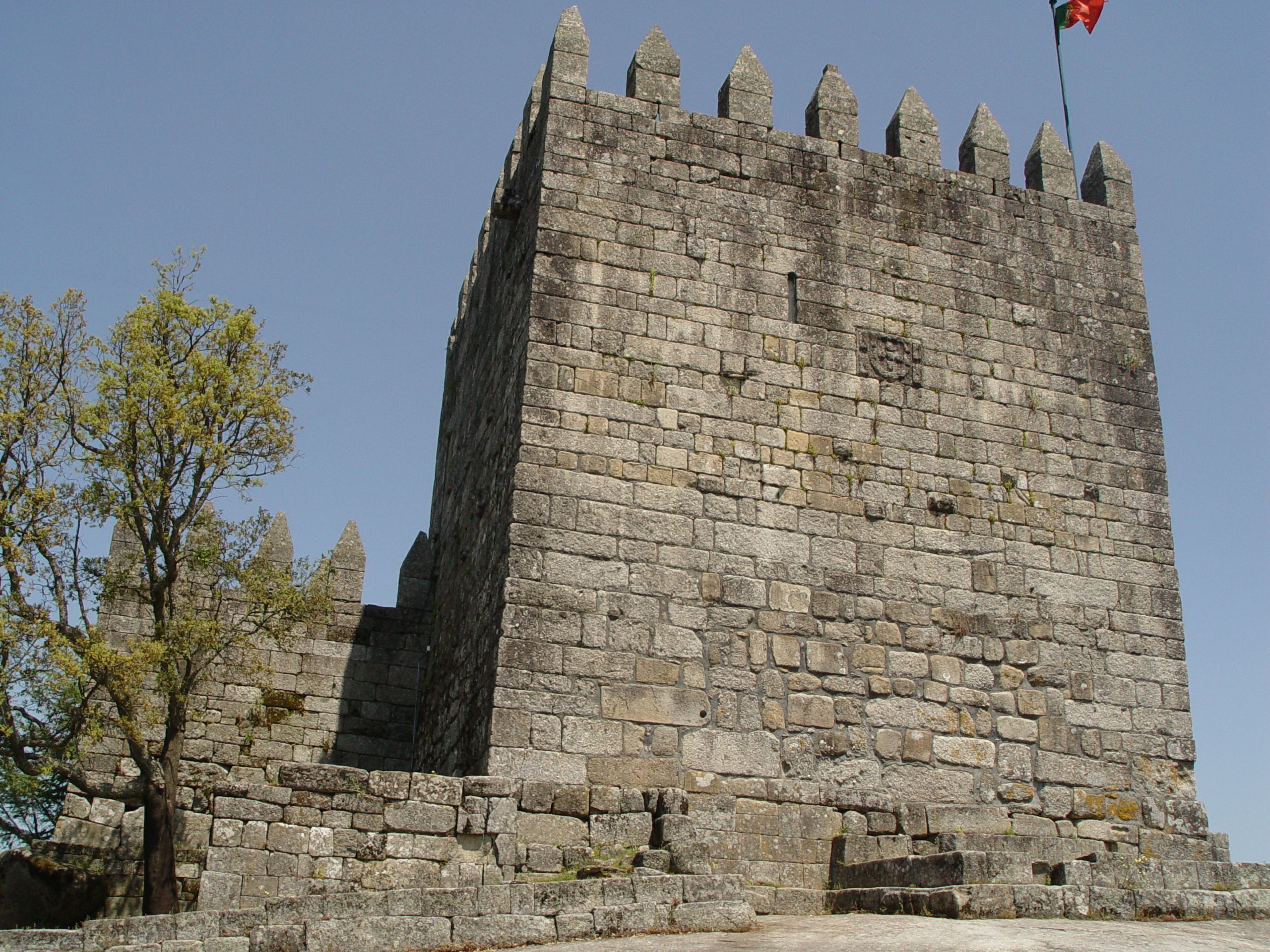
- A view of the keep tower and base at the site of the fortification

Site information
- Type: Castle
- Owner: Portuguese Republic

Location
- Coordinates: 41°35′12.58″N 8°16′52.06″W

Site history
- Built: 2nd Century
- Materials: Granite

The Castle of Lanhoso (Portuguese: Castelo de Lanhoso) is a medieval castle located in civil parish of Póvoa de Lanhoso (Nossa Senhora do Amparo), municipality of Póvoa de Lanhoso, Portuguese district of Braga of Portugal.

== History ==
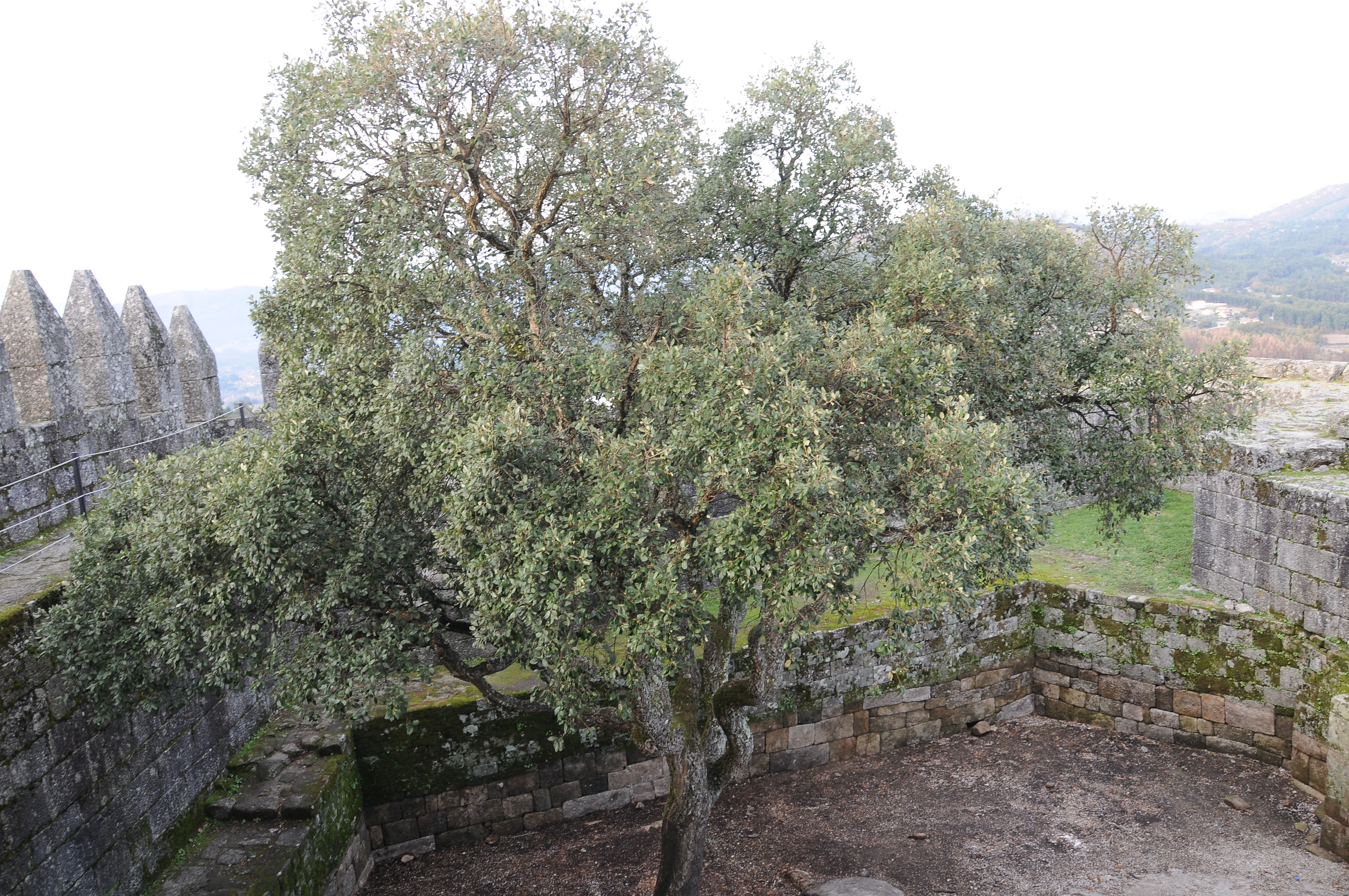
The courtyard of the remnants of the medieval castle

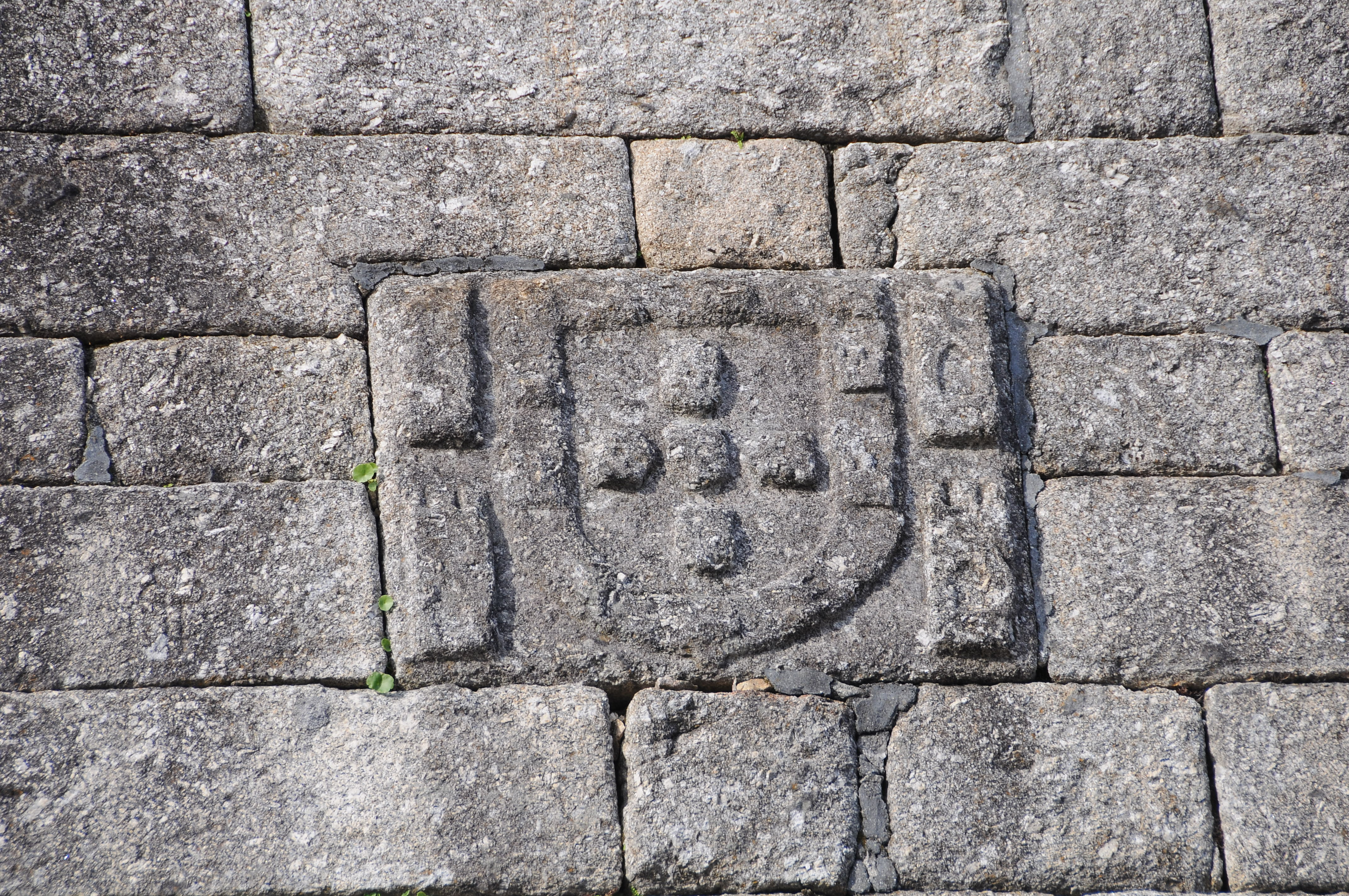
A view of the medieval coat-of-arms at the entranceway

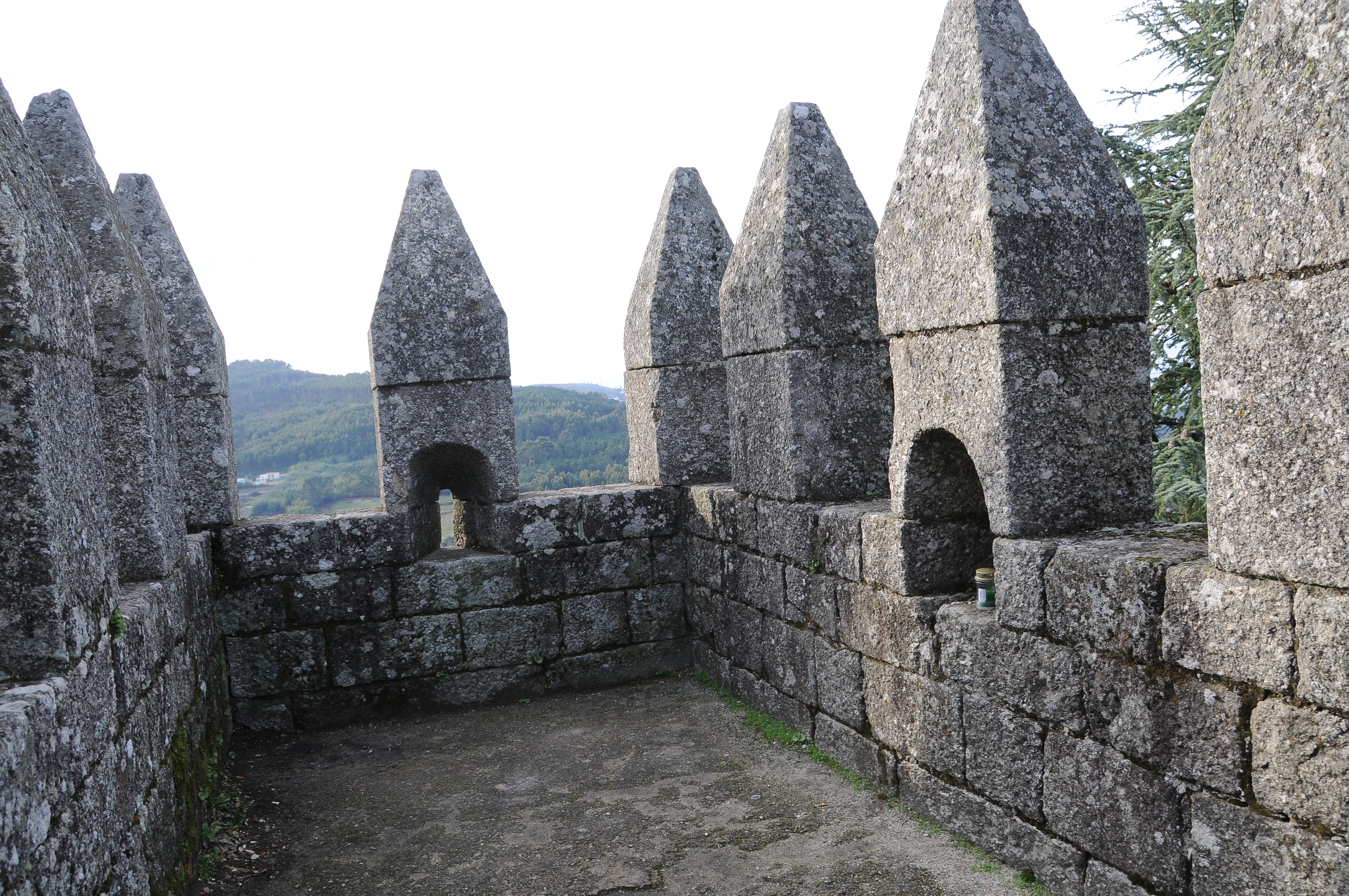
The 3 metres (9.8 ft) high merlons on the battlements of the castle

The site on top of the mount had been occupied since the Chalcolithic period.

Between the 10th and 11th century, the castle existed as a series of walls and corners.

It was between 1071 and 1091 that Bishop D. Pedro, whose episcopate lasted between 1070 and 1091, supported the reconstruction of the castle's ashlar walls, over the pre-Romanic fortress, that originally defended the episcopal seat of Braga. An epigraphic plate in ashlar was located on the site, that reads: PETRIS AEPISCOPUS.

In 1121, D. Teresa of León sought refuge in the rebuilt castle, to which she was besieged by forces loyal to her half-sister D. Urraca, Queen of León. Urraca took Theresa captive. However, an intervention by Bishop Gelmires forced the two to an agreement, the Treaty of Lanhoso, that preserved the land holdings of both sides. Then, in 1128, she was imprisoned in the same castle, under the orders of her son, D. Afonso Henriques, after the Battle of São Mamede.

By the end of the 12th century or beginning of the 13th century, there was a Romanesque change in the construction of the keep tower, when the fortress was the centre of the region.

The castle was the site of a crime of passion, when the alcalde, D. Rui Gonçalves Pereira, the great-great-grandfather of D. Nuno Álvares Pereira, discovered the infidelity of his wife while away. Upon learning of the marital infidelity of his wife, Inês Sanches, who was enamored with a friar from the monastery of Bouro, ordered the castle gates closed and fire set to the citadel. The fire killed Inês and her lover, as well as the servants, who were considered accomplices in the infidelity, for not having denounced the fact. By his order, no one escaped the fire alive (including domestic animals) when the structure burned down.

By 1264, the alcalde was D. Godinho Fafez, great-grandson of Fafez Luz, Master of Lanhoso, who nominated as his successor Mem Cravo.

On 25 September 1292, King D. Dinis conceded a foral (charter) to the town of Póvoa do Lanhoso, which was later confirmed by King D. Manuel I on 4 January 1514.

Following the consolidation of the kingdom's frontiers, the castle gradually lost its strategic importance and fell into abandon and ruined. This continued into the 17th century, when André da Silva Machado, a wealthy merchant from Porto decided to build a replica of the Sanctuary of Bom Jesus de Braga. In 1680, he obtained authorization to dismantle the old fortress to re-use the stones to build a sanctuary to the invocation of Our Lady of the Pillar. Working on demolishing the barbican and part of the walls, building within the enclosure the church, staircase and the pilgrim chapels, that became known as the Shrine of Our Lady of Pilar. By 1724, work on the sanctuary was still occurring.

In a description by Craesbeeck in 1726, he substantiated that the walls were in a state of ruin. But, in the 1758 Memórias Paroquiais, there is an indication that the old castle was only survived by the tower keep.

Between 1938 and 1939 there were excavations around the castle. At the same time work on reconstructing the structure was begun, that included reconstitution of two corbels; consolidation and reconstruction of the walls and gate; and restoration of the keep tower. Following similar excavations, there were repairs and consolidation to the remnants of the old foundations unearthed, including the partial reconstitution of the lines around the keep tower and exterior. Work on cleaning and landscaping around the mountain progressed, with the reconstruction of an access to the castle completed. Excavations around the remnants of the castro situated along the northeastern flank of the hilltop and work on the Church of the Nossa Senhora do Pilar sanctuary were also completed.

Repairs were also undertaken in 1959, 1973, 1975 and 196; these include conservation; reconstruction of the access staircase to the tower; roofing the keep tower; and reconstruction of the gate. While in 1996, cleaning and consolidation of the exterior structures were carried out by employees of the municipal council and members of the Associação Adere-Lanhoso group, as well as the remodelling of the second-floor interiors.

Although partially ruined, the Castle of Lanhoso is a popular attraction, receiving 100,000 visitors between 1996 and 2006. In addition to the castle (which offers a small exhibition), the shrine and castro are also important points of interest.

== Architecture ==
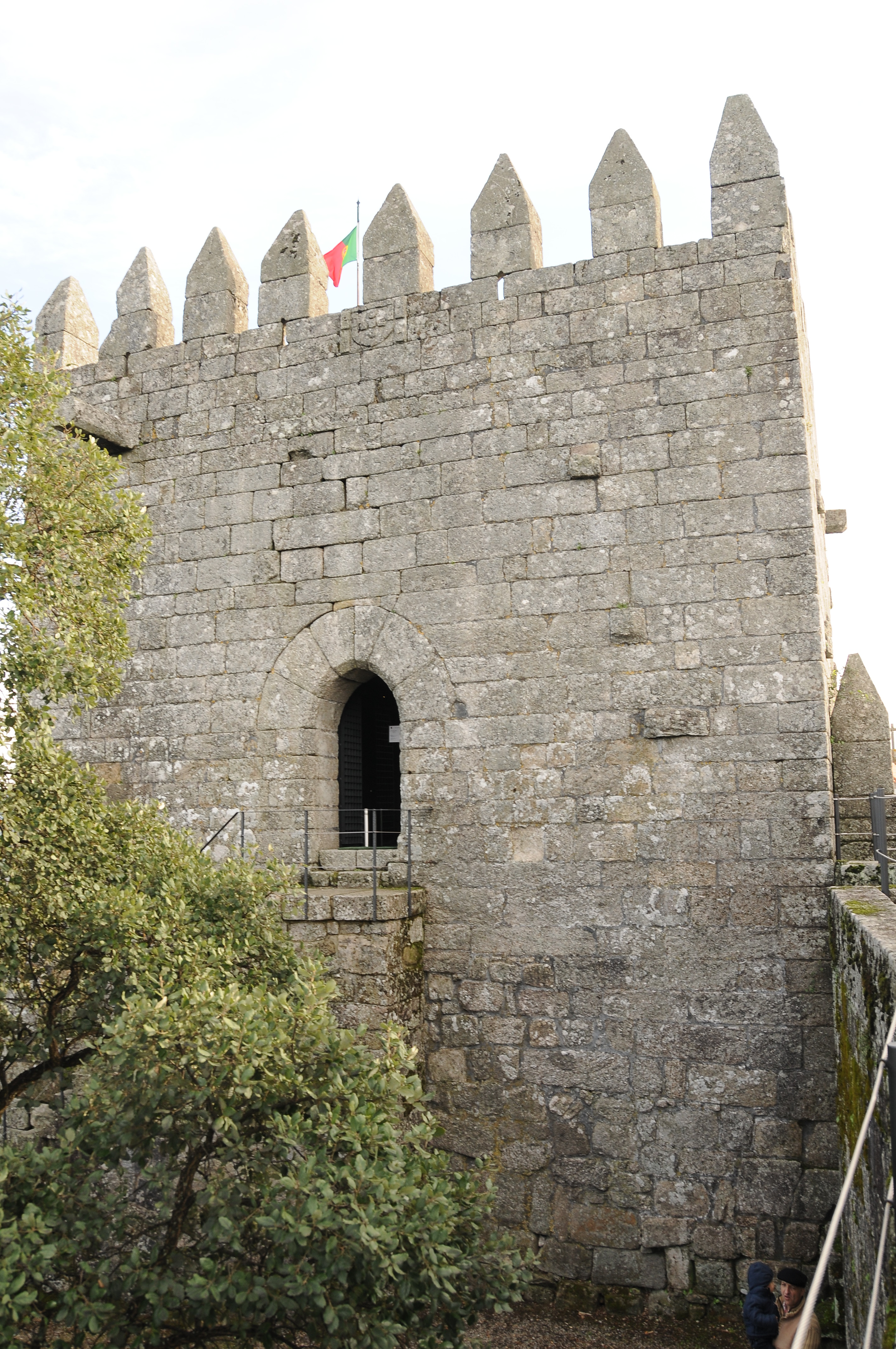
The facade of the keep tower

The castle is situated in a rural landscape, isolated and implanted mount 385 metres (1,263 ft) along a massif range called as Laje Grande, that divides the watersheds of the Cávado and Ave river systems. The highest point of the mountain consists of the a large rocky hilltop, where the medieval castle overlooks the town of Póvoa de Lanhoso. The location is situated over a small fertile valley that is well irrigated, crossed by the Ribeira da Póvoa, Ribeira Pereira and Ribeira de Pregal, that are tributaries of the Ave watershed. Half way on the flank, on the road accessway are vestiges of a Romanized settlement of pre- to proto-historic nature. At the top of the mount, within the walls of the castle is the Sanctuary of Nossa Senhora do Pilar, with a winding "Via Sacra" that extends from the foot of the hill, punctuated by five chapels and a support building for pilgrims with restaurant.

The castle is situated on the extreme west of the mount, encircled by a wall, with two visible corbels, along the extreme opposite side and north, forming an elliptical barbican. The fortification is an irregular plan with a rectangular keep tower in the east. The walls, surmounted by merlons, is broken in the south alongside the keep tower, with arched gate, flanked by two towers and with a staircase carved into the rock.

The keep tower, surmounted by merlons, is 10 metres (33 ft) high and is accessible by an arched doorway 3 metres (9.8 ft) above the ground. The line of walls circle the terrain within which is the alcalde's citadel and a large cistern. The vestiges of the old citadel include its foundations and towers at the angles and part of an accessway, that allude to the pre-Roman relief. Internally, the rectangular space includes two lines of pillars.
