= Febo Moniz =

Portuguese nobleman

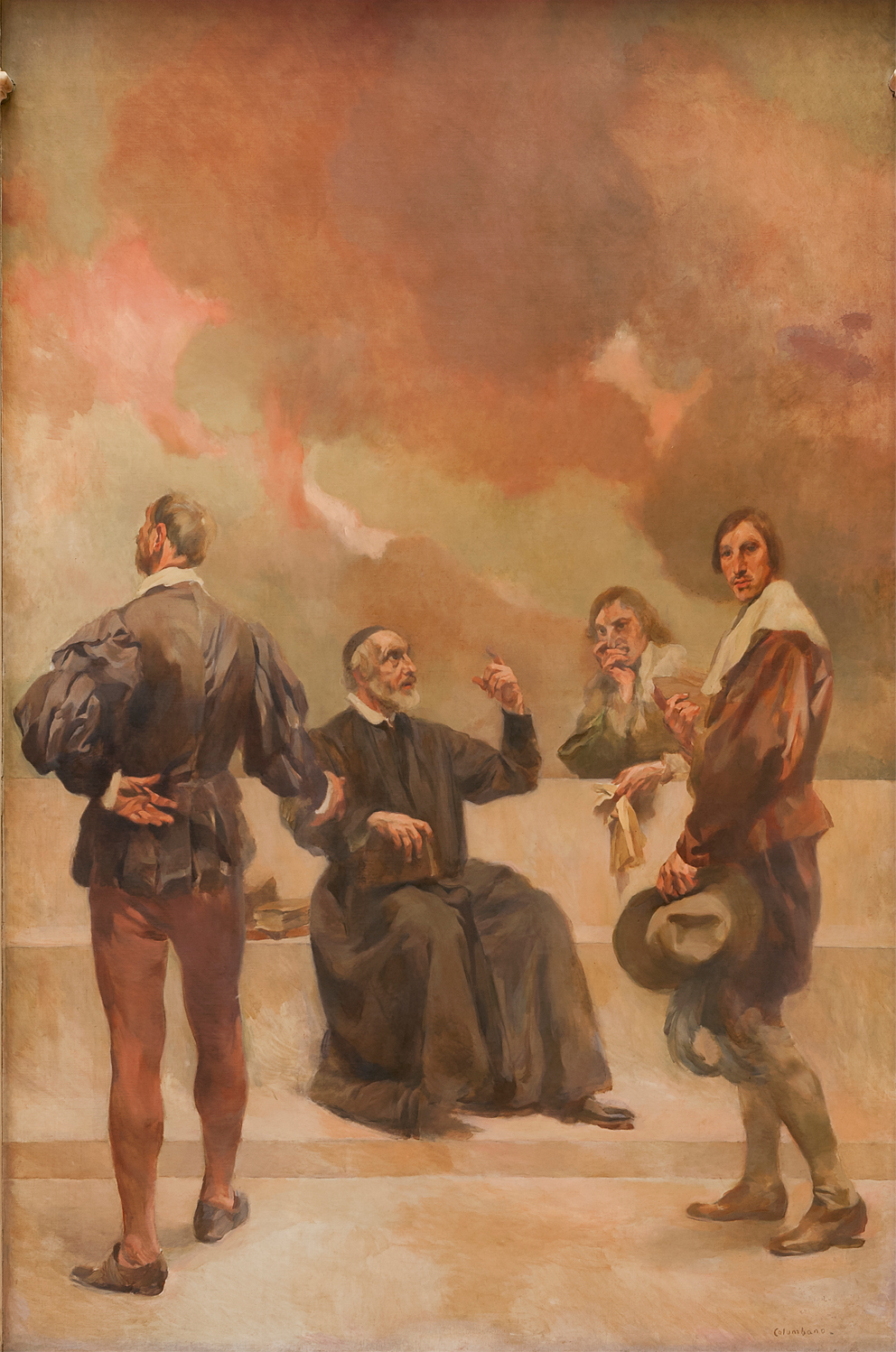
The painting of Febo Moniz, Father António Vieira, D. Luís de Meneses (3rd Count of Ericeira), and João Pinto Ribeiro, by Columbano in 1926 for the Palace of Saint Benedict, Lisbon, Portugal.

Febo (or Febos) Moniz (1515 – aft. 1580) was a Portuguese nobleman who distinguished himself during the 1580 Portuguese succession crisis.

== Life ==
He was the second son of Jerónimo Moniz and wife Violante da Silva.

Fidalgo, he fulfilled offices in the Paço and was Semilher do Corpo or Semilher de Corpus and a valet of King Sebastian of Portugal and his Major Chamberlain and Gentleman of his chamber. He was also the Lord of the Chapel of Our Lady of Piety at the Carmo Convent, in Lisbon.

=== 1580 Portuguese succession crisis ===
He distinguished himself in the opposition to the pretensions of the Castilian King Philip II in the Cortes of Almeirim, where he was a procurator elected by the people of Lisbon, after Cardinal Henry, King of Portugal having despotically annulled the election of Dom Manuel de Portugal and Dom Diogo Salema. He counted then 64 years of a peaceful life, but his energy before the weaknesses and hesitations of Henry surprised everyone and gave him a sudden popularity.

At the Cortes of Almeirim, on 11 January 1580, as President of the Deputies of villages and cities, Febo Moniz vigorously impeached the suggestions of Cardinal Henry to consider with calm the pretensions of Philip II of Spain to successor of Sebastian. His energy communicated to the Cortes, which unexpectedly rejected a message from the King that had the manifest intent of restrain the Cortes' prerogatives. Henry went exasperated and have told by the Bishop Dom António Pinheiro that for his will should Philip be considered as possible successor in the throne. Febo Moniz, outraged, protest with vehemence against what said the treason, before the Crucifix, taken as symbol of the idea of Justice thus knocked. He reunited around him the Procurators of the people and with them assented in that all the Councils were immediately warned of the imminent danger. On 22 January 1580, Febo Moniz and all the Procurators swore upon the Host that they would prefer to die that to accept the sovereignty of Philip of Spain. In contrast with the arm of the nobility, which contemporized ever more, the popular arm augmented its resistance, to the point of deciding, with the greatest serenity, despite repeated messages of the Cardinal, that only to Lisbon, and not to all the realm, should compete the election of the new King.

The Cortes envoyed Henry a deputation, presided by Febo Moniz. It was violent the discussion between the Procurator and the King, who unmannerly had the conference ended. He soon regretted and took the resolution of damping the people's resistance, through the force of patience. As he felt death close and was able to admit the pretensions of the Castilian King, he had called to the Paço the five Procurators of the first bench, who were the ones of Lisbon, Porto, Évora, Coimbra and Santarém, and in the presence of all of them, he prompted that they ceased the opposition, referring them the decisions of the nobility and the clergy, favourable to the acclamation of Philip of Spain, but Febo Moniz denied himself to any deliberation, as Henry was getting along with suspicious people and enemy of the motherland. The Cardinal-King tried uselessly to impose his will, invoked the formidable power of Spain, but Febo Moniz did not cede and revindicated for the people the right of electing a Portuguese King, as it had been done, two centuries before, with the Master of Aviz. The Cardinal-King could not win this resistance and, time later, dead himself, the events came to show the corruption and venality of the upper classes of the Nation.

Febo Moniz proposed to disobey the Governors of the Kingdom and saw, with astonishment, that his proposal was rejected by a large majority, despite the enthusiasms of the first moment. The gold and the fear, employed as arguments by Cristóvão de Moura, replaced the patriot's influence. The Governors of the Kingdom dissolved the Cortes of Almeirim, at instances of Cristóvão de Moura. Deeply dispirited, Febo Moniz retired himself to Santarém, where the tumultuous acclamation of the Prior of Crato as King of Portugal made him understand that the national cause was losing itself.

He kept withdrawn and, when he triumphed, Philip ordained the incarceration of the patriot in a gaol, in which he died soon after.

Febo Moniz Street, in Lisbon, was named after him.

== Marriage and issue ==
He married his relative Dona Isabel de Lima, daughter of Dom Pedro de Castelo-Branco, of the Admirals of Portugal, and wife Margarida de Lima, and had seven children:

- Pedro Moniz, who died unmarried and without issue a captive at Fes
- Jerónimo Moniz, second son, who served at Tangiers and after widowed went to Flanders with the Cardinal and married to Elvira de Alarcão, daughter of Gaspar de Torres and wife Leonor de Alarcão, and a widow without issue of Sebastião da Silva
- João Moniz, who was a Page of the Bell of King Sebastian of Portugal and was held captive at the Battle of Alcácer Quibir, and had a Command at the Order of Christ, the one of Sabugal, and died unmarried and without issue
- Maria Luísa or Antónia da Silva, Dame of Queen Catherine of Austria, married as his second wife to Francisco (or António) de São-Paio de Melo or de Melo de São-Paio, 7th Lord de Vila Flor and Alcaide-Mór de Moncorvo who succeeded in his father's House at the death of his brothers
- Maria Catarina, alias, Margarida da Silva, a Nun at Santa Clara, in Lisbon
- Violante or Maria Violante da Silva, a Nun at Santa Clara, in Lisbon
- Ana or Maria Ana de Ataíde, married to Heitor de Melo, bastard son of Martim Afonso de Melo, without issue

== Sources ==
- Manuel João da Costa Felgueiras Gaio, "Nobiliário das Famílias de Portugal", Tomo Vigésimo Primeiro, Título de Monizes, § 17, § 18 e § 19, Tomo Vigésimo Sexto, Título de Sampayos, § 1
- Various Authors, "Armorial Lusitano", Lisbon, 1961, pp. 370–372
- Dom Augusto Romano Sanches de Baena e Farinha de Almeida Portugal Sousa e Silva, 1.º Visconde de Sanches de Baena, "Archivo Heraldico-Genealógico", Lisbon, 1872, Volume II, p. CXV
- Cristóvão Alão de Morais, "Pedatura Lusitana", Volume I (reformulated edition), pp. 668–670
- Various Authors, "Grande Enciclopédia Portuguesa e Brasileira", Lisbonm, 1961, Volume XVII Mermo-Moura, p. 630
