= Officers of the Armenian Kingdom of Cilicia =

The Armenian Kingdom of Cilicia mirrored the Latin Kingdom of Jerusalem in it selection of great offices: constable, marshal, seneschal, admiral, Chamberlain, butler, chancellor and at certain times also bailiff.

The Officers of the Armenian Kingdom of Cilicia are as follows:

== Constable ==
- Sempad the Constable
- John of Poitiers-Lusignan

== Marshal ==
- Stephen of Armenia
