= Diego de Muros =

Diego de Muros may refer to:

- Diego de Muros (bishop of Ciudad Rodrigo) (1405–1492), Spanish Roman Catholic bishop
- Diego de Muros (Bishop of Islas Canarias) (died 1507), Spanish Roman Catholic bishop
- Diego de Muros (bishop of Oviedo) (died 1525), Spanish Roman Catholic bishop
