= Armentarius =

Galician bishop

Armentarius (Spanish: Armentario) was the Bishop of Mondoñedo, when its seat was still at Dumium, from at least 984 until his death sometime between 1018 and 1025.

Armentarius is first recorded as bishop on 24 April 984. His predecessor, since as early as 977 perhaps, was Arias Peláez, whose loss of his see cannot be dated more precisely. On 29 September 985 he subscribed a charter of Vermudo II of León privileging the Abbey of Celanova. On 1 February 1007, as bishop of Mondoñedo, he confirmed the ruling of Alfonso V of León ordering the return of various properties belonging to the Abbey of Celanova that had been illegally occupied by certain foreigners in the days of Vermudo II. This ruling was also confirmed by Arias Peláez. On 22 August Alfonso V also ruled on the boundaries to obtain between the counties of Aveancos and those of Cornado and Bembejo, a ruling which was likewise confirmed by Armentarius and by Arias.

Armentarius was still bishop as late as 1018, when he signed the act of a royal judgement of Alfonso V as "Armentarius, in Christ's name, by the grace of God, bishop of the see of Dumium." In his ruling Alfonso ordered Ossorio Fróilaz to return certain goods he had received on loan from the late queen Teresa Ansúrez to her daughters, Sancha and Teresa. Armentarius' successor, Nuño I, is not recorded until 1025, so it is possible that Armentarius' episcopate continued for some years after 1018. The existence of a Suarius I between Armentarius and Nuño is probably the product of reading the date of certain charter of Suarius II (1058–70) as 1015, although there are to suspicious charters from 1020–22 that refer to a bishop Suarius of an unspecified see, who might be the phantom Suarius I.

== Notes ==
Catholic Church titles
Preceded by Arias II	Bishop of Dumium; 984–1018	Succeeded by Nuño I
