= Pedro Gudestéiz =

Pedro Gudestéiz was the bishop of Mondoñedo from 1155 until 1168 and then archbishop of Santiago de Compostela until 1173.

As early as 1128, Pedro Gudestéiz was the cardinal primiclerus of the cathedral of Santiago de Compostela. He served as a tutor to the future king Ferdinand II. By 1152, he was the prior of the monastery of Sar, when he received on behalf of the monastery certain churches from King Alfonso VII. He was elected bishop of Mondoñedo in 1155 in what was probably more like a royal appointment.

On 18 August 1156, Pope Adrian IV issued a bull placing the diocese of Mondoñedo and the churches it owned outside of its boundaries under papal protection and confirming Pedro's decision to install canons regular in the basilica of San Martiño. In 1159–1160, Pedro served Ferdinand II as royal chancellor. Between 1159 and 1163, he was almost continuously at court, witnessing nearly every royal document. In 1162, he was present when Ferdinand II signed the treaty of Ágreda with King Alfonso II of Aragon.

In 1164, Pedro exchanged churches with Count Álvaro Rodríguez and his wife Sancha Fernández. In 1167, he was the royal mayordomo. On 20 January 1167, Ferdinand II confirmed various divisions previously agreed to between Pedro and Count Álvaro. At some point, a dispute erupted between Pedro and Countess Sancha, which was only resolved with royal intervention under his successor, Rabinato, in 1178, when properties belonging to the bishop that had been unjustly usurped were ordered restored.

By February 1168, Pedro had been elected archbishop of Santiago de Compostela. He appears in documents of February–March as bishop of Mondoñedo and archbishop elect. He was probably the favoured royal candidate. He was on good terms with the Order of Santiago, but had a falling out with the cardinal legate Hyacinth Bobo in 1172–1173. He reignited a dispute over the primacy of the Spains and resigned the archdiocese in 1173. He was succeeded by Pedro Suárez de Deza.
