= Deodato Bocconi =

Roman Catholic prelate and bishop

Most Reverend Deodato Bocconi
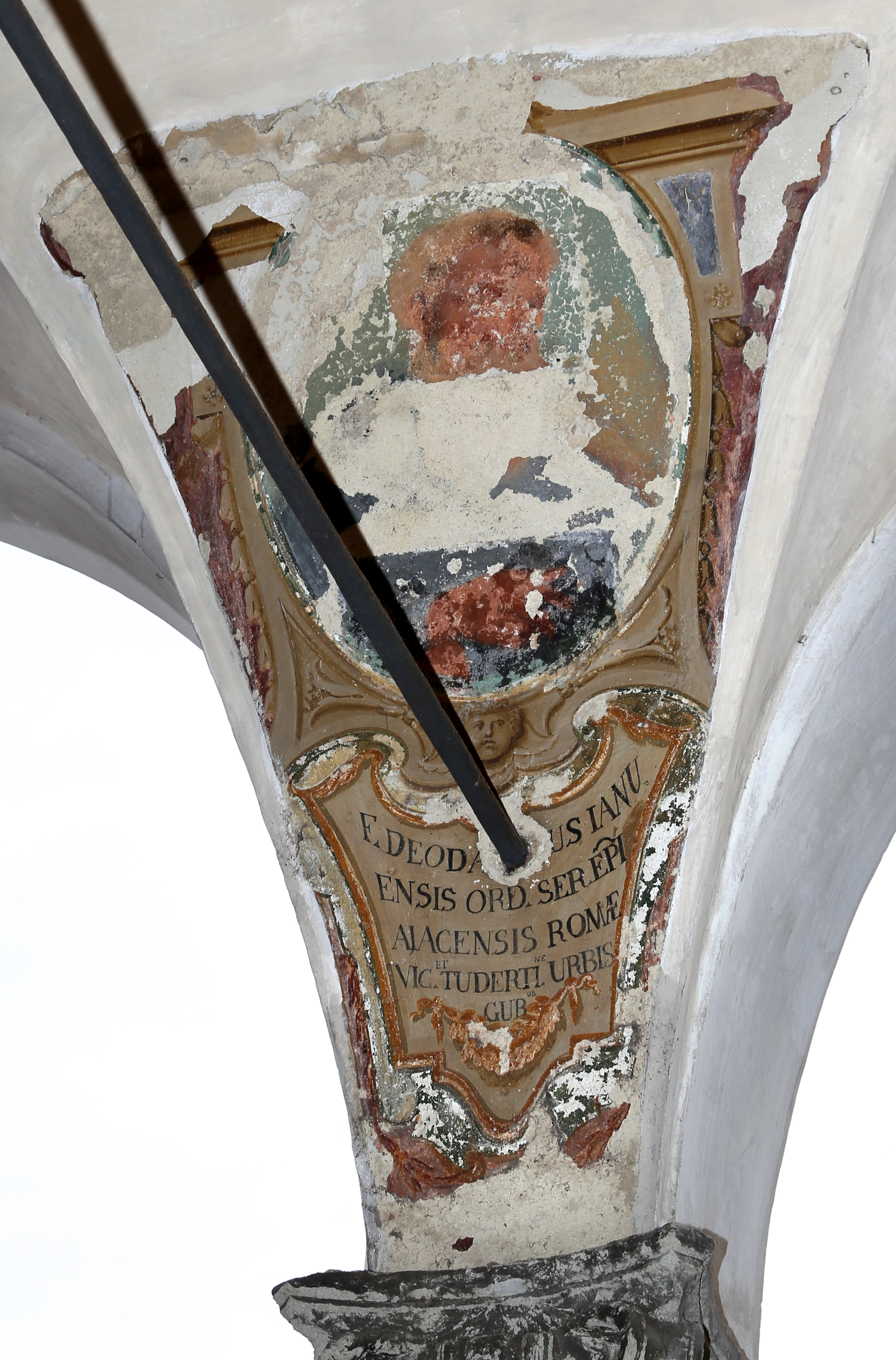
- Church: Catholic Church
- Diocese: Diocese of Ajaccio
- In office: 1457–1477
- Predecessor: André Dias de Escobar
- Successor: Gabriel de Franchis

Personal details
- Died: 1477 Ajaccio, France

Deodato Bocconi (also Deodato Boctoni) (died 1477) was a Roman Catholic prelate who served as Bishop of Ajaccio (1457–1477).

== Biography ==
On 20 May 1457, Deodato Bocconi was appointed during the papacy of Pope Sixtus IV as Bishop of Ajaccio. He served as Bishop of Ajaccio until his death in 1477. While bishop, he was the principal co-consecrator of Diego de Moiras, Bishop of Tui (1473); Nicolas de Caffa, Bishop of Toul (1473); and Fernando de Castilla, Bishop of Granada (1474).

Catholic Church titles
Preceded by André Dias de Escobar	Bishop of Ajaccio; 1457–1477	Succeeded by Gabriel de Franchis
