= Rafael Díaz de Cabrera =

Spanish Roman Catholic prelate

Most Reverend Rafael Díaz de Cabrera
- Bishop of Mondoñedo
- Church: Catholic Church
- Archdiocese: Diocese of Mondoñedo
- In office: 1618–1630
- Predecessor: Pedro Fernández Zorrilla
- Successor: Francisco Villafañe

Orders
- Consecration: 30 December 1618 by Fernando Acevedo González

Personal details
- Born: 1565 La Coronada, Spain
- Died: 30 September 1630 (age 65) Mondoñedo, Spain

Rafael Díaz de Cabrera (1565 - 30 September 1630) was a Roman Catholic prelate who served as Bishop of Mondoñedo (1618–1630).

== Biography ==
Rafael Díaz de Cabrera was born in La Coronada, Spain and ordained a priest in the Order of the Most Holy Trinity. On 6 August 1618, he was selected by the King of Spain and confirmed by Pope Paul V as Bishop of Mondoñedo. On 30 December 1618, he was consecrated by Fernando Acevedo González, Archbishop of Burgos with Juan Zapata Osorio, Bishop of Zamora, and Francisco Pereira, Bishop of Miranda, serving as co-consecrators. He served as Bishop of Mondoñedo until his death on 30 September 1630.

Catholic Church titles
Preceded by Pedro Fernández Zorrilla	Bishop of Mondoñedo; 1618–1630	Succeeded by Francisco Villafañe
