= Diocese of Mondoñedo-Ferrol =

Roman Catholic diocese in Spain

Coordinates: 43°25′41.38″N 7°21′45.78″W

Diocese of Mondoñedo-Ferrol Dioecesis Mindoniensis-Ferrolensis Diócesis de Mondoñedo-Ferrol (es) Diocese de Mondoñedo-Ferrol (gl)

Catholic
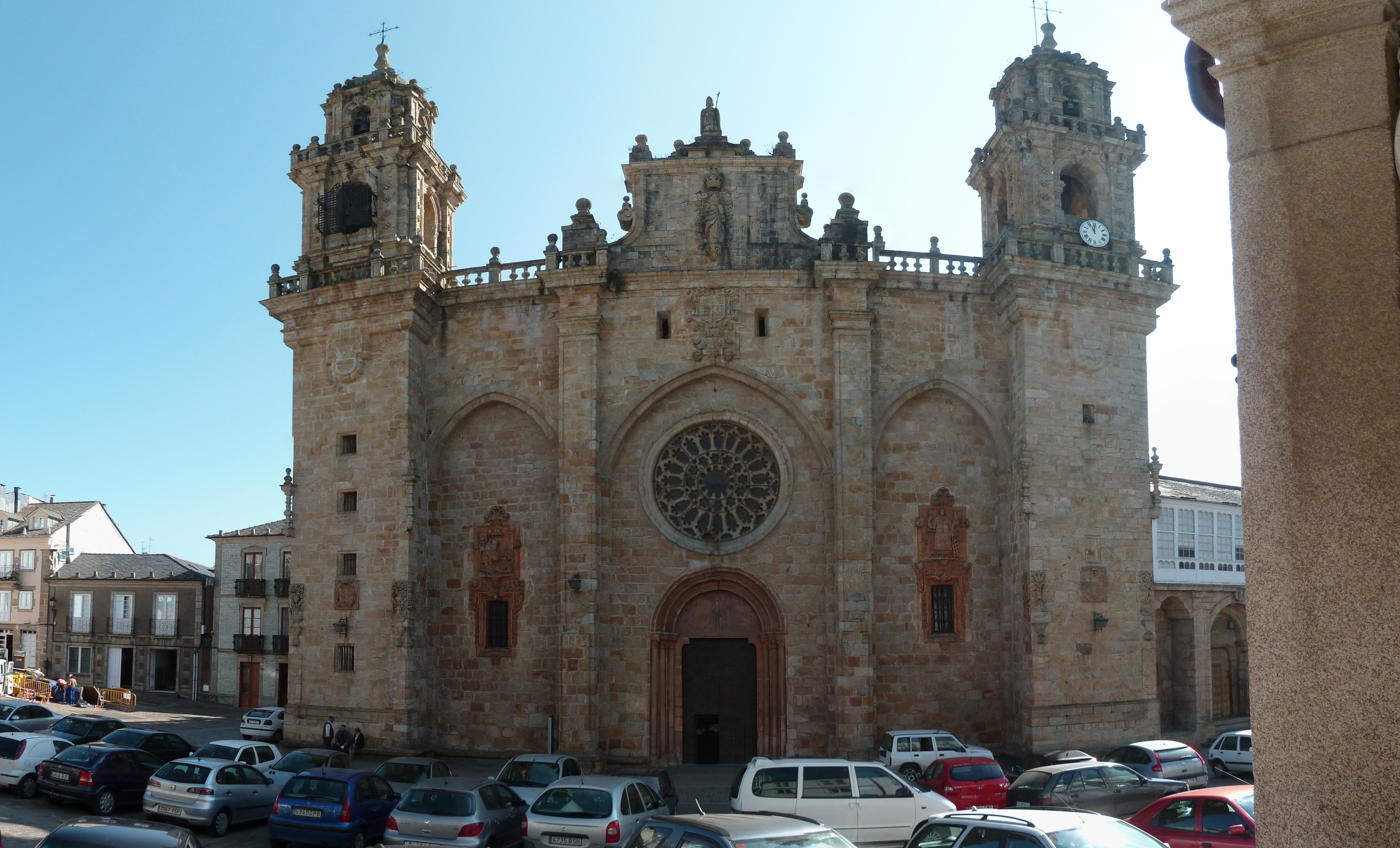
- Cathedral of Mondoñedo

Location
- Country: Spain
- Ecclesiastical province: Santiago de Compostela
- Metropolitan: Santiago de Compostela

Statistics
- Area: 4,425 km^{2} (1,709 sq mi)
- Population: Total; Catholics: (as of 2013); 292,200; 291,100 (99.6%)
- Parishes: 422

Information
- Denomination: Catholic
- Sui iuris church: Latin Church
- Rite: Roman Rite
- Established: 572 (As Diocese of Bretoña); 881 (As Diocese of San Martiño); 1136 (As Diocese of Vilamaior); 1199 (As Diocese of Ribadeo); 1219 (As Diocese of Mondoñedo); 9 March 1959 (As Diocese of Mondoñedo-Ferrol)
- Cathedral: Cathedral Basilica of the Assumption of Our Lady in Mondoñedo
- Co-cathedral: Co-Cathedral of St Martin in El Ferrol

Current leadership
- Pope: Leo XIV
- Bishop elect: Fernando García Cadiñanos
- Metropolitan Archbishop: Francisco José Prieto Fernández

Website
- mondonedoferrol.org

The Diocese of Mondoñedo-Ferrol (Latin: Dioecesis Mindoniensis-Ferrolensis) is a Latin diocese of the Catholic Church in Spain. It is the northernmost of the four suffragan dioceses in the ecclesiastical province of the Metropolitan Archdiocese of Santiago de Compostela, which covers Galicia in the northwest of Spain. The area had previously been home to Britonia, a settlement founded by expatriate Britons in the wake of the Anglo-Saxon invasion of Britain. Britonia was represented by the diocese referred to as Britonensis ecclesia (Britton church) in sources from the 6th and 7th centuries.

The bishop has a (main) cathedral (from Latin "cathedra" meaning episcopal seat), a minor basilica and World Heritage Site (Catedral Basílica de la Virgen de la Asunción, dedicated to the Assumption of Mary) in Mondoñedo, administrative Province of Lugo, and a co-cathedral Concatedral de San Julián in Ferrol, administrative Province of A Coruña, as well as a former cathedral which is a minor basilica, Basilica de San Martín de Mondoñedo in Foz, Lugo province.

== History ==
- 866: Established as Diocese of San Martiño de Mondoñedo on Galician territories split off from the Diocese of Oviedo and Metropolitan Archdiocese of Lugo
- Renamed in 1114 as Diocese of San Martiño de Mondoñedo–Dume, having gained territory from the suppressed Diocese of Dume (in Portugal)
- Renamed in 1219 as Diocese of Mondoñedo / Mindonien(sis) (Latin), having lost territory to Metropolitan Archdiocese of Braga (Portugal)
- On 17 October 1954 it gained territory from Diocese of Oviedo, lost territory to Metropolitan Archdiocese of Santiago de Compostela, and exchanged territory with Diocese of Lugo
- Renamed on 9 March 1959 as Diocese of Mondoñedo–Ferrol / Mindonien(sis)–Ferrolen(sis) (Latin)

Some authorities have sought to fix the date of the foundation of this diocese (under its primitive name of Britonia) earlier than the second half of the 6th century, but the later date seems the more probable when we consider that, at the Second Council of Braga (572), Mailoc, Bishop of Britonia, was ranked lowest because of the more recent origin of his see. It seems to have been founded by the Suevian king, Theodomir, converted to Catholicism by St Martin of Dumio, and to have included in its jurisdiction the churches of the Britones (a territory coinciding with that of Mondoñedo) and some of those of the Asturias. In the beginning it was a suffragan of Lugo, until the Goths placed Lugo under the jurisdiction of Braga. After Mailoc no mention is found of the bishops of Britonia for a long time, doubtless because the great distance from Toledo made it impossible for them to assist at the councils. In 633 Metopius, Bishop of Britonia, assisted at the Fourth Council of Toledo, presided over by St Isidore of Seville. Sonna, his successor, was one of the bishops who signed at the Seventh Council of Toledo (646) and sent a representative to the Eighth Council of Toledo (16 December 653). When Britonia was invaded and destroyed by the Saracens, the bishop and priests took refuge in Asturias. In 899, during the reign of Alfonso III of Asturias, Theodesimus, Bishop of Britonia, assisted with other prelates at the consecration of the church of Santiago de Compostela. It may also be noted that, in the repartition of the parishes, the church of San Pedro de Nova was assigned as the residence of the bishops of Britonia and Orense, when they should come to assist at the councils of Oviedo. By that time, however, the See of Britonia had been translated to the town of Mondumetum and the church of St. Martin of Dumio, or Mondoñedo. The diocese has since been most generally known by this name, although the episcopal residence has again changed. After the time of St. Martin it was transferred to Villamayor de Brea, from which it derived the name of Villabriensis, and afterwards to Ribadeo, but it was nevertheless known as Mindoniense, as a document of the year 1199 bears witness. At first, its patron was St. Martin of Tours, but St. Martin of Dumio was afterwards chosen patron.

The diocese of Valabria, corresponding to the diocese that had its seat at Villamayor de Brea, is included in the Catholic Church's list of titular sees.

== Leadership ==
=== Bishops of Britonia (Bretoña) ===
- Mailoc (Second Council of Braga, 572)
- Metopius (Fourth Council of Toledo, 633)
- Sonna (Seventh Council of Toledo, 646)
- Susa (Eighth Council of Toledo, 653)
- Bela (Third Council of Braga, 675)

=== Bishops of Dumio (Dumium, San Martiño) ===
- Savaric I (866–877)
- Rudesind I (877–907)
- Savaric II (907–924)
- Rudesind II (925–950)
- Arias I Núnez (950–955)
- Rudesind II (again) (955–958)
- Arias I Núnez (again) (959–962)
- Rodrigo (965–972)
- Teodomiro (972–977)
- Arias II Peláez (977–984)
- Armentario (984–1011)
- Suario I (1015–1022)
- Nuño I (1025–1027)
- Adulfo (¿–?)
- Albito (1040?)
- Suario II (1058–1071)
- Saint Gonzalo (1071–1112)
- Nuño Alfonso (1112–1136)

=== Bishops of Vilamaior ===
- Pelayo I (1136–1154)
- Pedro Gudestéiz (1155–1167)
- Joán Pérez (1170–1173)
- Rabinato (1177–1199)

=== Bishop of Ribadeo ===
- Pelayo de Cebeyra (Pelayo II) (1199–1218)

=== Bishops of Mondoñedo ===
- Martín Duniense (1219–1248)
- Joán II de Sebastiáns (1248–1261)
- Nuño II Pérez (1261–1286)
- Álvaro Gómez (1286–1297)
- Rodrigo Vázquez (1298–1318)
- Gonzalo Osorio (1319–1326)
- Joán III (1327–1329)
- Álvaro Pérez de Biezma (1326–13431)
- Vasco (1343–1346)
- Alfonso Sánchez (1347–1366)
- Francisco I (1367–1393)
- Lope de Mendoza (1393–1399)
- Álvaro de Isorna (1400–14151)
- Gil Soutelo (1415–1425)
- Gil Rodríguez de Muros (1429–1432)
- Pedro Henríquez (1426–1445)
- Pedro Arias Vaamonde (1446–1448)
- Alfonso de Segura (1449–1455)
- Alfonso Vázquez de Acuña (1455–1457, appointed Bishop of Jaén)
- Fadrique de Guzmán (1462–1492)
- Alonso Suárez de la Fuente del Sauce (1493–1495, appointed Bishop of Lugo)
- Pedro de Munébrega (1498–1504)
- Diego de Muros (bishop of Oviedo) (4 Apr 1505 Appointed – 1 Oct 1512 Appointed, Bishop of Oviedo)
- Diego Pérez Villamuriel (1 Oct 1512 Appointed – 1520 Died)
- Juan Loaysa (8 Jun 1524 – 1525 Died)
- Jerónimo Suárez Maldonado (10 Jul 1525 Appointed – 20 Mar 1532 Appointed, Bishop of Badajoz)
- Pedro Pacheco de Villena (Ladrón de Guevara) (6 Sep 1532 Appointed – 11 Apr 1537 Appointed, Bishop of Ciudad Rodrigo)
- Antonio Guevara Noroña, O.F.M. (11 Apr 1537 Appointed – 3 Apr 1545 Died)
- Diego Soto Valera (27 Nov 1545 Appointed – 21 Aug 1549 Died)
- Francisco de Santa María Benavides Velasco, O.S.H. (17 Jul 1550 Appointed – 21 Oct 1558 Appointed, Bishop of Segovia)
- Pedro Maldonado (bishop), O.F.M. (23 Jan 1559 Appointed – 2 Jul 1566 Died)
- Gonzalo de Solórzano (13 Jan 1567 Appointed – 18 Feb 1570 Appointed, Bishop of Oviedo)
- Antonio Luján Luján, O.F.M. (20 Feb 1570 Appointed – 7 Oct 1570 Died)
- Juan de Liermo Hermosa (4 Jun 1574 Appointed – 26 Jul 1582 Appointed, Archbishop of Santiago de Compostela)
- Isidoro Caja de la Jara (20 Dec 1582 Appointed – 26 May 1593 Died)
- Gonzalo Gutiérrez Montilla (16 Nov 1593 Appointed – 18 Sep 1598 Appointed, Bishop of Oviedo)
- Diego González Samaniego (1 Feb 1599 Appointed – 22 Oct 1611 Died)
- Alfonso Mesía de Tovar (18 Jun 1612 Appointed – 27 Jan 1616 Appointed, Bishop of Astorga)
- Pedro Fernández Zorrilla (23 Mar 1616 Appointed – 23 Jul 1618 Appointed, Bishop of Badajoz)
- Rafael Díaz de Cabrera, O.SS.T. (6 Aug 1618 Appointed – 30 Sep 1630 Died)
- Francisco Villafañe (12 May 1631 Appointed – 5 Sep 1633 Appointed, Bishop of Osma)
- Antonio Valdés Herrera (19 Dec 1633 Appointed – 23 Jun 1636 Appointed, Bishop of Oviedo)
- Gonzalo Sánchez de Somoza Quiroga (21 Jun 1638 Appointed – 14 Aug 1644 Died)
- Juan Juániz de Echalar (31 Jul 1645 Appointed – 16 Dec 1647 Appointed, Bishop of Calahorra y La Calzada)
- Francisco Torres Grijalba, O.S.A. (13 Jan 1648 Appointed – 4 Sep 1672 Died)
- Dionisio Pérez Escobosa (23 Apr 1663 – 9 Jul 1668 Appointed, Bishop of Zamora)
- Luis Tello de Olivares (26 Nov 1668 – 16 May 1671 Died)
- Sebastián de Arévalo y Torres, O.F.M. (16 May 1672 – 20 Apr 1682 Appointed, Bishop of Osma)
- Gabriel Ramírez de Arellano, O.P. (25 May 1682 – 22 Oct 1689 Died)
- Miguel Quijada, O. Cist. (27 Sep 1690 – 31 May 1698 Died)
- Manuel Francisco Navarrete y Ladrón de Guevara (1 Jun 1699 – 18 May 1705 Appointed, Archbishop of Burgos)
- Juan Antonio Muñoz Salcedo, O.S.H. (1705 Ordained Bishop – 5 May 1728 Died)
- Antonio Alejandro Sarmiento Sotomayor, O.S.B. (21 Sep 1728 – 18 Oct 1751 Died)
- Juan Manuel de Escobar y de la Carrera (24 Apr 1752 Appointed – 27 Jul 1752 Died)
- Carlos Antonio Riomol Quiroga (17 Nov 1752 Appointed – 1 Mar 1761 Died)
- José Francisco Losada Quiroga (23 Nov 1761 Appointed – 30 Jun 1779 Died)
- Francisco Cuadrillero Mota (11 Dec 1780 Appointed – 23 Mar 1797 Died)
- Andrés Aguiar Caamaño (18 Dec 1797 Appointed – 12 Nov 1815 Died)
- Bartolomé Cienfuegos (22 Jul 1816 Appointed – 22 Jan 1827 Died)
- Francisco López Borricón (25 Jun 1827 Appointed – 10 Dec 1839 Died)
- Tomás Iglesias Bárcones (20 May 1850 Appointed – 28 Nov 1851 Appointed, Patriarch of West Indies)

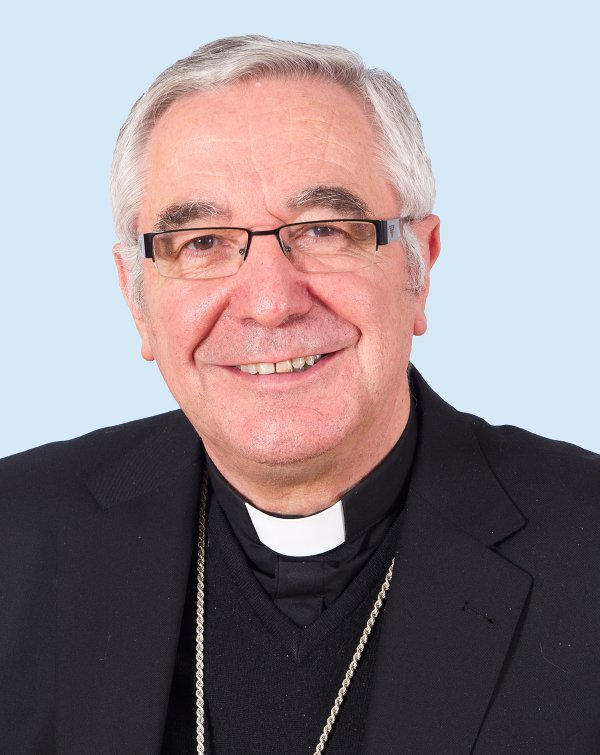
Bishop Manuel Sánchez Monge (2016).

- Telmo Maceira (27 Sep 1852 Appointed – 28 Sep 1855 Appointed, Bishop of Tui)
- Ponciano Arciniega (25 Sep 1857 Appointed – 3 Sep 1868 Died)
- Francisco de Sales Crespo y Bautista (5 Jul 1875 Appointed – 18 Feb 1877 Died)
- José Manuel Palacios y López (25 Jun 1877 Appointed – 2 Dec 1885 Died)
- José María Cos y Macho (10 Jun 1886 Appointed – 14 Feb 1889 Appointed, Archbishop of Santiago de Cuba)
- Manuel Fernández de Castro y Menéndez (30 Dec 1889 Appointed – 27 Jun 1905 Died)
- Juan José Solís y Fernández (14 Dec 1905 Appointed – 24 Feb 1931 Died)
- Benjamín de Arriba y Castro (1 May 1935 Appointed – 8 Aug 1944 Appointed, Bishop of Oviedo)
- Fernando Quiroga y Palacios (25 Nov 1945 Appointed – 4 Jun 1949 Appointed, Archbishop of Santiago de Compostela)
- Mariano Vega Mestre (5 Oct 1950 Appointed – 25 Apr 1957 Died)

=== Bishops of Mondoñedo-Ferrol ===
- Jacinto Argaya Goicoechea (12 September 1957 Appointed – 18 November 1968 Appointed, Bishop of San Sebastián)
- Miguel Angel Araújo Iglesias (2 July 1970 Appointed – 20 May 1985 Resigned)
- José Gea Escolano (15 May 1987 Appointed – 6 June 2005 Retired)
- Manuel Sánchez Monge (6 June 2005 Appointed – 6 May 2015 Appointed, Bishop of Santander)
- Luis Ángel de las Heras Berzal (16 March 2016 Appointed – 21 October 2020 Appointed, Bishop of León)
- Fernando García Cadiñanos (1 July 2021 Appointed – present)

== Statistics and extent ==
As of 2014, it served 290,000 Catholics (99.7% of 291,000 total population) on 4,425 km^{2} in 422 parishes, covering the northern part of the Province of A Coruña and the Province of Lugo, with 153 priests (143 diocesan, 10 religious), 225 lay religious (14 brothers, 211 sisters) and 3 seminarians.

=== Parishes by District ===
==== Azumara District ====
- Ansemar
- Arneiro
- Azúmara
- Balmonte
- Baltar
- Bazar
- Bián
- Bretoña
- Cadavedo
- Castro de Rei
- Corbelle
- Crecente
- Ferreiros (Santo André)
- Ferreiros (San Martiño)
- Fonmiñá
- Goberno
- Graña de Vilarente
- Gueimonde
- Lagoa
- Loboso
- Moncelos
- Muimenta
- Outeiro
- Pacios
- A Pastoriza
- Piñeiro
- Pousada
- Prevesos
- Quintela
- Ramil
- Reigosa (San Vicente)
- Reigosa (Santiago)
- Saldanxe
- Silva
- Santa Leocadia
- Úbeda
- Viladonga
- Vilarente

==== Begonte-Parga District ====
- Baamonde
- Becín
- Begonte
- Bóveda
- O Buriz
- Carral
- Castro
- Cerdeiras
- Damil
- Donalbai
- Felmil
- Gaibor
- Guitiriz
- Illán
- Labrada
- Lagostelle
- Mariz
- Pacios
- Parga (San Breixo)
- Parga (Santo Estevo)
- Parga (O Salvador)
- Parga (Santa Cruz)
- Parga (Santa Leocadia)
- Pena (San Vicente)
- Pena (Santa Eulalia)
- Roca
- Saavedra
- Trasparga
- Trobo
- Uriz
- Valdomar
- Vilar
- Os Vilares
- Virís

==== Cedeira District ====
- Abade
- A Barqueira
- Os Casás
- Cedeira
- Cerdido
- Cervo
- Esteiro
- Labacengos
- Moeche (Santa Cruz)
- Moeche (San Xoán)
- Moeche (San Xurxo)
- Montoxo (San Román)
- Montoxo (San Xiao)
- Piñeiro
- Régoa
- Teixido
- Vilarrube

==== Ferrol-Chamorro District ====
- Brión
- A Cabana
- Cobas
- Doniños
- Esmelle
- Narón (Santa Icía)
- Ferrol (Santa Mariña)
- Ferrol (San Paulo)
- Ferrol (San Xoán de Filgueiras)
- A Graña
- Mandíá
- A Mariña
- Serantes

==== Ferrol-San Julian District ====
- Ferrol (Nosa Señora das Angustias)
- Ferrol (Nosa Señora das Dores)
- Ferrol (Nosa Señora do Carme)
- Ferrol (Nosa Señora do Pilar)
- Ferrol (Nosa Señora do Rosario)
- Ferrol (Nosa Señora do Socorro)
- Ferrol (San Domingos)
- Ferrol (San Miguel Arcanxo)
- Ferrol (San Pedro Apóstolo)
- Ferrol (San Pío X)
- Ferrol (San Rosendo)
- Ferrol (San Xiao)
- Ferrol (Santa Cruz)
- Ferrol (Santa María)

==== Miranda District ====
- Agarda
- Aldurfe
- Álvare
- Bogo
- Conforto
- Espasande
- Ferreiravella
- Galegos
- Meilán
- Moxoeira
- Órrea
- A Pontenova
- Rececende (Santo Estevo)
- Rececende (San Xoán)
- Riotorto
- Vilaboa
- Vilarmeá
- Vilarmide
- Vilaodrid
- Xudán

==== Mondoñedo District ====
- Argomoso
- Cabarcos (San Xiao)
- Cabarcos (San Xusto)
- Celeiro de Mariñaos
- Couboeira
- Figueiras
- Líndín
- Lourenzá (Santo Adrián)
- Lourenzá (San Tomé)
- Lourenzá (San Xurxo)
- Santa María Maior
- Masma
- Mondoñedo (Nosa Señora do Carme)
- Mondoñedo (Nosa Señora dos Remedios)
- Mondoñedo (Santiago)
- Mondoñedo (San Vicente)
- Oirán
- Sasdónigas
- Vilamor
- Vilanova de Lourenzá
- Viloalle

==== Ortigueira District ====
- Barbos
- Cariño
- Céltigos
- Couzadoiro (San Cristobo)
- Couzadoiro (O Salvador)
- Cuiña
- Os Devesos
- O Ermo
- Espasante
- Feás
- Os Freires
- As Grañas do Sor
- Insua, Ladrido
- Landoi
- Loiba
- Luía
- Mera (Santiago)
- Mera (Santa María)
- As Neves
- Ortigueira
- A Pedra
- Senra
- Sismundi
- San Claudio
- Veiga

==== As Pontes District ====
- Apparel
- Burgás
- O Burgo
- Cabreiros
- Candamil
- O Deveso
- Espiñaredo
- O Freixo
- Irixoa
- Lousada
- Miraz
- Momán
- Muras
- Piñeiro
- Pontes (Somede)
- As Pontes (Santa María)
- Recemel
- Roupar
- Seixas
- As Somozas
- Vilavella
- Viveiró
- Xermade
- Xestoso (San Pedro)
- Xestoso (Santa María)

==== Ribadeo District ====
- Arante
- Balboa
- Barreiros
- Benquerencia
- Cedofeita
- Couxela
- Cubelas
- A Devesa
- Fórnea
- Ove
- Piñeira
- Reinante (Santiago)
- Reinante (San Miguel)
- Ría de Abres
- Ribadeo
- Rinlo
- Sante
- Trabada
- Vidal
- Vilaformán
- Vilaframil
- Vilamartín Pequeno
- Vilaosende
- Vilaouruz
- Vilapena
- Vilaselán

==== (Mondoñedo) San Martino District ====
- Burela
- Cangas de Foz
- Castelo
- Cervo
- Fazouro
- Foz
- Lago
- San Martiño de Mondoñedo
- Monte
- Morás
- Nois
- Portocelo
- A Rigueira
- Rúa
- Sargadelos
- Sumoas
- San Cibrán (Lieiro)
- Santa Icía
- Vilaestrofe
- Vilaronte
- Xove
- Xuances

==== Terra Chá District ====
- Arcillá
- Barredo
- Bendia
- Bestar
- Bexán
- Cospeito
- Duancos
- Duarría
- Feira do Monte
- Goá
- Lamas
- Lea
- Loentia
- Ludrio
- Matodoso
- A Meda
- Momán
- Mondriz
- Mos
- Nete
- Oleiros
- Orizón
- Pino
- Ribeiras de Lea
- Rioaveso (Santa Eulalia)
- Rioaveso (San Xurxo)
- Roás
- Seixas
- Sisoi
- Sistallo
- Sobrada
- Santa Cristina
- Taboi
- Támoga
- Triabá
- Vilapene
- Xermar
- Xustás

==== Valadouro District ====
- Adelán
- Alaxe
- Bacoi
- Budián
- Cadramón
- Carballido
- Castro de Ouro
- Cordido
- Ferreira do Valadouro
- Frexulfe
- Lagoa
- Mor
- Moucide
- Oirás
- Pereiro
- Recaré (San Tomé)
- Recaré (San Xiao)
- Valadouro (Santo Acisclo)
- Valadouro (Santa Cruz)
- Vilacampa

==== Vilalba District ====
- Abadín
- Abeledo
- Alba
- Aldixe
- Árbol
- A Balsa
- Baroncelle
- Belesar
- Boizán
- Cabaneiro
- Candia
- Carballido
- Castromaior
- Cazás
- Codesido
- Corbelle
- Corvite
- San Simón da Costa
- Distriz
- Fanoi
- Galgao
- As Goás
- Goiriz
- Gondaisque
- Insua
- Labrada
- Ladra
- Lanzós (San Martiño)
- Lanzós (O Salvador)
- Montouto
- Mourence
- Noche
- Pígara
- Quende
- Román
- Romariz
- Samarugo
- Sancobade
- Santaballa
- Soexo
- Tardade
- Torre
- Vilalba
- Vilapedre
- Xoibán

==== Viveiro District ====
- Ambosores
- Boimente
- Bravos
- Cabanas (San Pantaleón)
- Cabanas (Santa María)
- Celeiro
- Covas
- Chavín
- Faro
- Galdo
- Landrove
- Magazos
- Mañón
- Merille
- Miñotos
- Mogor (O Barqueiro)
- Mosende
- As Negradas
- Ourol
- Ribeiras do Sor
- Riobarba
- Silán, Sixto
- Suegos
- San Román do Val
- Valcarría
- Vares
- O Vicedo
- Vieiro
- Viveiro (San Pedro)
- Viveiro (Santiago)
- Viveiro (Santa María)
- Xerdiz

==== Xubia District ====
- Anca
- Bardaos
- Castro
- Doso
- Ferreira
- Igrexafeita
- Lago
- Lamas
- Loira
- Lourido
- Meirás
- Santa Mariña do Monte
- Naraío
- Narón (Nosa Señora dos Desamparados)
- Narón (Santiago Apóstolo)
- Narón (San Xosé)
- Narón (San Xiao)
- Neda (Santa María)
- Neda (San Nicolás)
- Pantín
- Pedroso
- Sedes
- Sequeiro
- San Sadurniño
- San Mateo de Trasancos
- O Val
- Valdoviño
- Vilaboa
- Viladonelle
- Xubia
- San Martiño do Couto
- Xubia (Santa Rita)

== See also ==
- List of Catholic dioceses in Spain, Andorra, Ceuta and Gibraltar

== Sources and external links ==
- (in Spanish) Official web site of the Diocese of Mondoñedo-Ferrol
- (in English) GCatholic.org - Diocese of Mondoñedo-Ferrol - data for all sections
- (in English) Catholic Hierarchy - Diocese of Mondoñedo-Ferrol
- (in English) Herbermann, Charles, ed. (1913). "Diocese of Mondoñedo" . Catholic Encyclopedia. New York: Robert Appleton Company.
- (in Spanish) List of Spanish Dioceses
- (in Spanish) Official Web-site of the Archdiocese of Santiago de Compostela
- (in Spanish) Official Web-site of the Diocese of Lugo
- (in Spanish) Official Web-site of the Diocese of Ourense
- (in Galician) Official Web-site of the Diocese of Tui-Vigo
