= Pedro Beltrán =

Pedro Beltrán may refer to:

- Pedro Beltrán (bishop) (died 1505), Roman Catholic prelate
- Pedro Beltrán Espantoso (1897–1979), Peruvian journalist, economist and politician
- Pedro Beltrán (actor) (1927–2007), Spanish actor
- Pedro Beltrán (footballer) (born 1988), professional Mexican footballer
- Pedro Ramayá Beltrán (born 1930), Colombian musician
