= Treaty of Ágreda =

Treaty of Ágreda may refer to:

- Treaty of Ágreda (1162)
- Treaty of Ágreda (1186)
- Treaty of Ágreda (1281)
- Treaty of Ágreda (1304)
