= Suarius I =

Galician bishop

Suarius I (1015–1022) was a medieval Galician bishop.

Catholic Church titles
Preceded by Armentarius	Bishop of Dumium; 1015–1022	Succeeded by Nuno I
