= Alonso Suárez de la Fuente del Sauce =

Spanish Roman Catholic prelate

Most Reverend Alonso Suárez de la Fuente del Sauce
- Bishop of Jaén
- Church: Catholic Church
- Diocese: Diocese of Jaén
- In office: 1500–1520
- Predecessor: Diego de Deza
- Successor: Esteban Gabriel Merino
- Previous posts: Bishop of Mondoñedo (1493–1496); Bishop of Lugo (1496–1500)

Personal details
- Died: 1520 Jaén, Spain

Alonso Suárez de la Fuente del Sauce (died 1520) was a Roman Catholic prelate who served as Bishop of Jaén (1500–1520), Bishop of Lugo (1496–1500), and Bishop of Mondoñedo (1493–1496).

== Biography ==
In 1493, Alonso Suárez de la Fuente del Sauce was during the papacy of Pope Alexander VI as Bishop of Mondoñedo. In 1496, he was appointed during the papacy of Pope Alexander VI as Bishop of Lugo. In 1500, he was appointed during the papacy of Pope Alexander VI as Bishop of Jaén. He served as Bishop of Jaén until his death in 1520.

== External links and additional sources ==
- Cheney, David M. "Diocese of Mondoñedo–Ferrol". Catholic-Hierarchy.org. (for Chronology of Bishops) ^{[self-published]}
- Chow, Gabriel. "Diocese of Mondoñedo–Ferrol (Spain)". Gcatholic. (for Chronology of Bishops) ^{[self-published]}
- Cheney, David M. "Diocese of Jaén". Catholic-Hierarchy.org. (for Chronology of Bishops) ^{[self-published]}
- Chow, Gabriel. "Diocese of Jaén (Spain)". GCatholic.org. (for Chronology of Bishops) ^{[self-published]}
- Cheney, David M. "Diocese of Lugo". Catholic-Hierarchy.org. (for Chronology of Bishops) ^{[self-published]}
- Chow, Gabriel. "Diocese of Lugo (Spain)". GCatholic.org. (for Chronology of Bishops) ^{[self-published]}

Catholic Church titles
Preceded by Fadrique de Guzmán	Bishop of Mondoñedo; 1493–1496	Succeeded by Pedro de Munébrega
Preceded by Alonso Enríquez de Lemos	Bishop of Lugo; 1496–1500	Succeeded by Diego Ramírez de Guzmán
Preceded by Diego de Deza	Bishop of Jaén; 1500–1520	Succeeded by Esteban Gabriel Merino
