= Diego González Samaniego =

Spanish Roman Catholic prelate

Most Reverend Diego González Samaniego
- Bishop of Mondoñedo
- Church: Catholic Church
- Archdiocese: Diocese of Mondoñedo
- In office: 1599–1611
- Predecessor: Gonzalo Gutiérrez Montilla
- Successor: Alfonso Mesía de Tovar

Orders
- Consecration: 11 July 1599 by Juan Alonso Moscoso

Personal details
- Died: 22 December 1611 Mondoñedo, Spain

Diego González Samaniego (died 22 December 1611) was a Roman Catholic prelate who served as Bishop of the Bishop of Mondoñedo (1599–1611).

== Biography ==
Diego González Samaniego was selected as Bishop of the Bishop of Mondoñedo by the King of Spain on 1 February 1599, and confirmed by Pope Clement VIII. He was consecrated on 11 July 1599 by Juan Alonso Moscoso, Bishop of the Bishop of León, with Gonzalo Gutiérrez Montilla, Archbishop of the Bishop of Oviedo, and Juan Zarzola, Bishop of the Bishop of Astorga, serving as co-consecrators. He served as Bishop of Mondoñedo until his death on 22 December 1611. While bishop, he served as the principal co-consecrator of Francisco Terrones del Caño, Bishop of the Bishop of Tui (1601).

Catholic Church titles
| Preceded by Gonzalo Gutiérrez Montilla | Bishop of Mondoñedo; 1599–1611 | Succeeded by Alfonso Mesía de Tovar |
