= Aloito (bishop of Mondoñedo) =

Bishop of Bretoña and of Dumio

Aluitus (?-1040-?) was a medieval Galician bishop.

Catholic Church titles
Preceded by Adulfus of Dumium	Bishop of Dumium ?-–1040-?	Succeeded by Suarius II
