= Fadrique de Guzmán =

Spanish Roman Catholic prelate

Most Reverend Fadrique de Guzmán
- Bishop of Mondoñedo
- Church: Catholic Church
- Diocese: Diocese of Mondoñedo
- In office: 1462–1492
- Predecessor: Alfonso Vázquez de Acuña
- Successor: Alonso Suárez de la Fuente del Sauce

Personal details
- Died: 1492 Mondoñedo, Spain

Fadrique de Guzmán (died 1492) was a Roman Catholic prelate who served as Bishop of Mondoñedo (1462–1492).

== Biography ==
In 1462, Fadrique de Guzmán was appointed during the papacy of Pope Pius II as Bishop of Mondoñedo. He served as Bishop of Mondoñedo until his death in 1492.

Catholic Church titles
Preceded by Alfonso Vázquez de Acuña	Bishop of Mondoñedo; 1462–1492	Succeeded by Alonso Suárez de la Fuente del Sauce
