= Pedro de Munébrega =

Spanish Roman Catholic prelate

Most Reverend Pedro de Munébregan
- Bishop of Mondoñedo
- Church: Catholic Church
- Diocese: Diocese of Mondoñedo
- In office: 1498–1504
- Predecessor: Alonso Suárez de la Fuente del Sauce
- Successor: Diego de Muros (bishop of Oviedo)

Personal details
- Died: 1504 Mondoñedo, Spain

Pedro de Munébregan (died 1504) was a Roman Catholic prelate who served as Bishop of Mondoñedo (1498–1504).

== Biography ==
In 1498, Pedro de Munébregan was appointed during the papacy of Pope Alexander VI as Bishop of Mondoñedo. He served as Bishop of Mondoñedo until his death in 1504.

Catholic Church titles
Preceded by Alonso Suárez de la Fuente del Sauce	Bishop of Mondoñedo; 1498–1504	Succeeded by Diego de Muros (bishop of Oviedo)
