= Nuño Alfonso =

Galician bishop

Nuño Alfonso (1112–1136) was a medieval Galician bishop.

Catholic Church titles
Preceded by Saint Gundisalvus	Bishop of Dumium; 1112–1136	Succeeded by Paio I de Vilamaior
