= Adulfus (bishop of Mondoñedo) =

Galician bishop

Adulfus of Dummium (?-?) was a medieval Galician bishop.

Catholic Church titles
| Preceded by Nuno I | Bishop of Dumium ?–? | Succeeded by Aluitus |
