= Diego Soto Valera =

Spanish Roman Catholic prelate

Most Reverend Diego Soto Valera
- Bishop of Mondoñedo
- Church: Catholic Church
- Diocese: Diocese of Mondoñedo
- In office: 1545–1549
- Predecessor: Antonio Guevara Noroña
- Successor: Francisco de Santa María Benavides Velasco

Personal details
- Born: Spain
- Died: 21 August 1549 Mondoñedo, Spain

Diego Soto Valera (died 21 August 1549) was a Roman Catholic prelate who served as Bishop of Mondoñedo (1545–1549).

He was born in Spain. On 27 Nov 1545, he was appointed during the papacy of Pope Paul III as Bishop of Mondoñedo. He served as Bishop of Mondoñedo until his death on 21 Aug 1549.

Catholic Church titles
| Preceded by Antonio Guevara Noroña | Bishop of Mondoñedo; 1545–1549 | Succeeded by Francisco de Santa María Benavides Velasco |
