= Saint Gonzalo =

Galician nobleman and clergyman

Saint Gonzalo (or Gundisalvus) (c. 1040 – c. 1108), a medieval Galician nobleman and clergyman, was the long-serving Bishop of Mondoñedo from 1071. According to one modern source he was a brother of Pedro Fróilaz de Traba. If he was elected at the canonical age of thirty, he would have been born in 1040 or 1041, which would in turn support the contemporary contention that he was old in 1104–5, but cast doubt on his relationship with Pedro Fróilaz. Perhaps he was a more distant relative of the same family, the budding House of Traba.

The diocese of Mondoñedo during the time of Gonzalo's episcopate has been described as "economically unremunerative and exposed to attack from the sea; the endowments ... were meagre; and the bishops were overshadowed in wealth and influence by the great monastery of Lourenzá." Gonzalo's tenure was spent fighting to sustain the integrity of his diocese, generally without success. He lost territory to Diego Gelmírez and the Diocese of Santiago de Compostela and he lost his enclaves in the Diocese of Braga. He tried but failed to secure from Alfonso VI a royal grant of large estates belonging to Lorenzana. In 1102 Diego Gelmírez began to dispute the archipresbyterates of Bezoucos, Trasancos, and Seaya with Gonzalo, to whose diocese they de facto pertained. The matter was brought before the council of Carrión de los Condes and on 4 February 1103 Bernard de Sedirac, Archbishop of Toledo, ordered Gonzalo to turn them over. (Already in 1087 Bernard had been made a judgement against Gonzalo in favour of Lorenzana.) Then, in April, Pope Paschal II sent a letter to Gonzalo and his fellow bishops of Santiago de Compostela, Astorga, and Coimbra, admonishing them to respect Braga as their metropolitan see, after the pope had received a complaint from the Archbishop Gerald. On 1 May a second letter from Paschal arrived at Mondoñedo ordering Gonzalo to comply with Bernard's judgement. Gonzalo then appealed the archbishop's decision to the Roman Curia. In 1104 representative of both bishops pleaded their cases before the pope in Rome. Gonzalo lost in 1105, but the debates continued beyond Gonzalo's lifetime and were only resolved in 1122. Probably the acts of defiance on the part of the metropolitan of Toledo, who laid claim to the primacy of Spain, were encouraged by Count Raymond of Galicia.

Gonzalo died early in 1108, and the brief vacancy that followed his death allowed Diego Gelmírez to assert his claims more successfully at Mondoñedo's expense.

== Notes ==
Catholic Church titles
Preceded by Suarius II	Bishop of Mondoñedo; 1071–1108	Succeeded by Nuño Alfonso
