= Alfonso Vázquez de Acuña =

Spanish Roman Catholic prelate

Most Reverend Alfonso Vázquez de Acuña
- Bishop of Jaén
- Church: Catholic Church
- Diocese: Diocese of Jaén
- In office: 1457–1474
- Successor: Iñigo Manrique de Lara (archbishop)

Personal details
- Died: 1474 Jaén, Spain

Alfonso Vázquez de Acuña (died 1474) was a Roman Catholic prelate who served as Bishop of Jaén (1457–1474) and Bishop of Mondoñedo (1455–1457).

== Biography ==
In 1455, Alfonso Vázquez de Acuña was appointed during the papacy of Pope Callixtus III as Bishop of Mondoñedo. In 1457, he was appointed during the papacy of Pope Callixtus III as Bishop of Jaén. He served as Bishop of Jaén until his death in 1474.

== External links and additional sources ==
- Cheney, David M. "Diocese of Mondoñedo–Ferrol". Catholic-Hierarchy.org. (for Chronology of Bishops) ^{[self-published]}
- Chow, Gabriel. "Diocese of Mondoñedo–Ferrol (Spain)". GCatholic.org. (for Chronology of Bishops) ^{[self-published]}

Catholic Church titles
Preceded by	Bishop of Mondoñedo; 1455–1457	Succeeded by Fadrique de Guzmán
Preceded by	Bishop of Jaén; 1457–1474	Succeeded by Iñigo Manrique de Lara (archbishop)
