= Diego Pérez Villamuriel =

Bishop of Mondoñedo from 1512 to 1520

Most Reverend Diego Pérez Villamuriel
- Bishop of Mondoñedo
- Church: Catholic Church
- Diocese: Diocese of Mondoñedo
- In office: 1512–1520
- Predecessor: Diego de Muros (bishop of Oviedo)
- Successor: Juan Loaysa

Personal details
- Born: Spain
- Died: 1520 Mondoñedo, Spain

Diego Pérez Villamuriel (died 1520) was a Roman Catholic prelate who served as Bishop of Mondoñedo (1512–1520).

Villamuriel was born in Spain. On 1 October 1512, he was appointed during the papacy of Pope Julius II as Bishop of Mondoñedo. He served as Bishop of Mondoñedo until his death in 1520.

Catholic Church titles
Preceded by Diego de Muros (bishop of Oviedo)	Bishop of Mondoñedo; 1512–1520	Succeeded by Juan Loaysa
