= Diego de Muros (bishop of Islas Canarias) =

Spanish Roman Catholic prelate

Most Reverend Diego de Muros
- Bishop of Islas Canarias
- Church: Catholic Church
- Diocese: Diocese of Islas Canarias
- In office: 1496–1507
- Predecessor: Miguel López de la Serna
- Successor: Pedro de Ayala

Personal details
- Died: 1507 Canary Islands, Spain

Diego de Muros (died 1507) was a Roman Catholic prelate who served as Bishop of Islas Canarias (1496–1507). He was one of three bishops of Spain of the same name who served contemporaneously, the others being Diego de Muros (bishop of Ciudad Rodrigo) and Diego de Muros (bishop of Oviedo).

== Biography ==
On 27 June 1496, Diego de Muros was appointed during the papacy of Pope Alexander VI as Bishop of Islas Canarias. He served as Bishop of Islas Canarias until his death in 1507.

== See also ==
- Diego de Muros (bishop of Ciudad Rodrigo)
- Diego de Muros (bishop of Oviedo)

== External links and additional sources ==
- Cheney, David M. "Diocese of Islas Canarias". Catholic-Hierarchy.org. (for Chronology of Bishops)^{[self-published]}
- Chow, Gabriel. "Diocese of Islas Canarias {Canary Islands} (Spain)". GCatholic.org. (for Chronology of Bishops)^{[self-published]}

Catholic Church titles
Preceded by Miguel López de la Serna	Bishop of Islas Canarias; 1496–1507	Succeeded by Pedro de Ayala
