= Rabinatus =

Rabinatus (or Rabinato) was the bishop of Mondoñedo from 1172 or 1174 until 1199. He was a chancery official during the reign of Alfonso VII and perhaps under Ferdinand II as well. He is recorded as a deacon in a document he drew up for Alfonso on 6 November 1156. He was an archdeacon in the diocese of Mondoñedo before his elevation as bishop. He was bishop when the see was moved from Villamayor de Brea to Ribadeo in 1182. In 1190, he made a donation to support the struggling monastery of Xuvia. In 1191, he attended the wedding of Alfonso IX and Theresa of Portugal. He died on 10 July 1199.

The name Rabinatus (or Rapinatus) is well attested in Galicia and among the Mozarabs. Its meaning as a name is unclear. It may have a religious meaning of 'one caught up (in the spirit)' ("que foi arrebatado pola fe").
