= Nuño I (bishop of Mondoñedo) =

Medieval Galician bishop

Nuno I was a medieval Galician bishop (1025–1029).

Catholic Church titles
Preceded by Suarius I	Bishop of Dumium; 1025–1027	Succeeded by Adulfus of Dumium
