= Suarius II =

Galician bishop

Suarius II (1058–1071) was a medieval Galician bishop.

Catholic Church titles
Preceded by Aluitus	Bishop of Dumium; 1058–1071	Succeeded by Saint Gundisalvus
