= Diego de Muros (bishop of Oviedo) =

Spanish Roman Catholic prelate

Most Reverend Diego de Muros
- Bishop of Islas Canarias
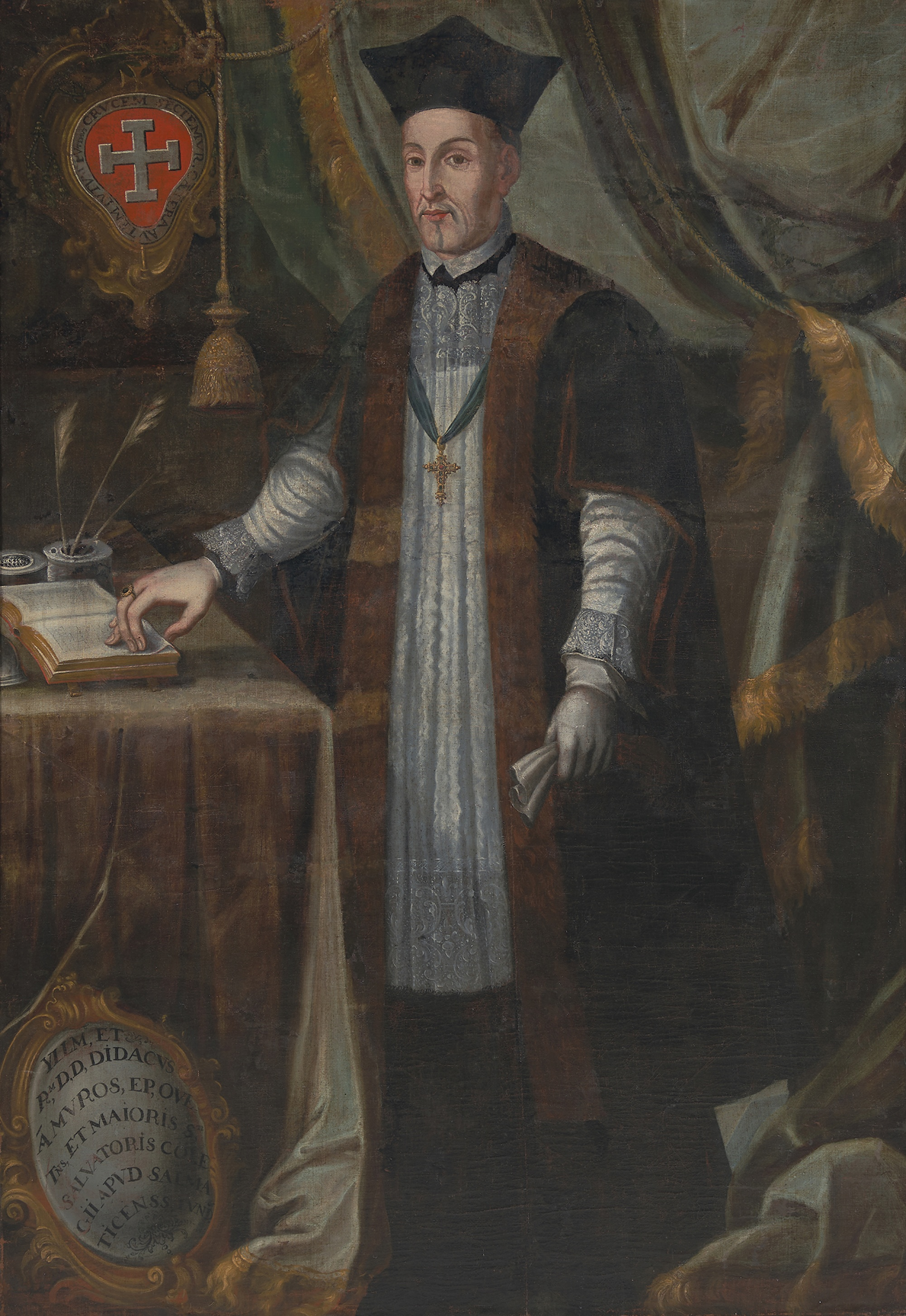
- Church: Catholic Church
- Diocese: Diocese of Islas Canarias
- In office: 1496–1507
- Predecessor: Valeriano Ordóñez Villaquirán
- Successor: Francisco Mendoza
- Previous post: Bishop of Mondoñedo (1505–1512)

Personal details
- Died: 18 August 1525 Oviedo, Spain

Diego de Muros (died 18 August 1525) was a Roman Catholic prelate who served as Bishop of Oviedo (1512–1525) and Bishop of Mondoñedo (1505–1512). He was one of three bishops of Spain who served contemporaneously, the others being Diego de Muros (Bishop of Islas Canarias) and Diego de Muros (bishop of Ciudad Rodrigo).

== Biography ==
On 4 April 1505, Diego de Muros was appointed during the papacy of Pope Julius II as Bishop of Mondoñedo. On 1 October 1512, Diego de Muros was appointed during the papacy of Pope Julius II as Bishop of Oviedo. He served as Bishop of Oviedo until his death on 18 August 1525.

== See also ==
- Diego de Muros (Bishop of Islas Canarias)
- Diego de Muros (bishop of Ciudad Rodrigo)

== External links and additional sources ==
- Cheney, David M. "Metropolitan Archdiocese of Oviedo". Catholic-Hierarchy.org. (for Chronology of Bishops) ^{[self-published]}
- Chow, Gabriel. "Archdiocese of Oviedo (Spain)". GCatholic.org. (for Chronology of Bishops) ^{[self-published]}
- Cheney, David M. "Diocese of Mondoñedo–Ferrol". Catholic-Hierarchy.org. (for Chronology of Bishops) ^{[self-published]}
- Chow, Gabriel. "Diocese of Mondoñedo–Ferrol (Spain)". GCatholic.org. (for Chronology of Bishops) ^{[self-published]}

Catholic Church titles
Preceded by Pedro de Munébrega	Bishop of Mondoñedo; 1505–1512	Succeeded by Diego Pérez Villamuriel
Preceded by Valeriano Ordóñez Villaquirán	Bishop of Oviedo; 1512–1525	Succeeded by Francisco Mendoza
