= Sancovade =

- Town
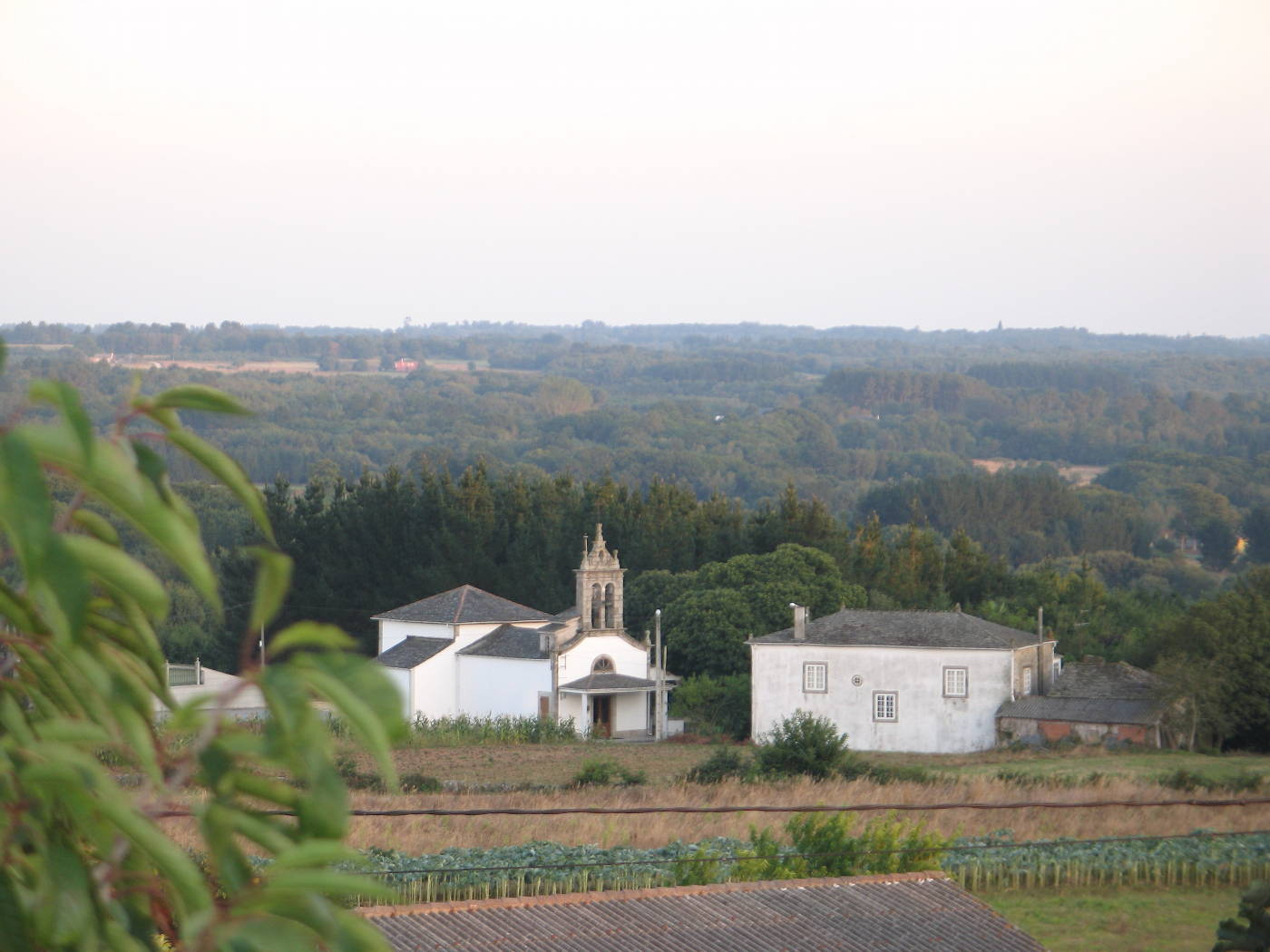
- Parrish Church of Santiago
- Interactive map of Sancovade
- Coordinates: 43°17′10″N 7°39′50″W
- Country: Spain
- Autonomous community: Galicia
- Province: Lugo
- Comarca: Terra Chá
- Municipality: Vilalba

Population (2022)
  - Total: 1,298

Sancovade is a parish in the Terra Chá comarca of Galicia, Spain. Its name translates as "Saint Cucuphas" (San Cobad, San Covade).

== Geography ==
In Sancovade, birch trees line the banks of the river Fabilos, in which it nestles several meadows and valleys.

== Festivals ==
The town celebrates the days of the Apostle Santiago of Guadalupe, in the chapel of Our Lady of Guadalupe and St. Anthony.

== Sources ==
- Vilalba.org: Parroquia de Sancobad (in Spanish)
- La Voz de Galicia: "Sancobade es la parroquia más poblada de toda la comarca", 30 December 2007 (in Spanish)
