= André Dias de Escobar =

Portuguese Benedictine theologian and bishop

André Dias de Escobar (Latin: Andreas Didaci de Escobar; c. 1366/67–c. 1448) was a Portuguese Benedictine theologian and bishop.

Born at Lisbon, Andreas de Escobar joined the Dominicans and then the Augustinians before becoming a Benedictine monk. He became doctor in theology at the University of Vienna in 1393. He became bishop of Ciudad Rodrigo, bishop of Ajaccio in 1422 and bishop of Megara in 1428. He was one of the most widely printed authors of the late fifteenth century. Escobar served as a minor penitentiary in the Apostolic Penitentiary of the Roman curia.

== Works ==
- Lumen confessorum
- Confessio minor seu Modus confitendi
- Confessio maior
- De decimis
- Canones penitentiales
