= La Coronada =

- Municipality
- Coat of arms

- Location of La Coronada within Extremadura
- Coordinates: 38°55′11″N 5°40′15″W
- Country: Spain
- Autonomous community: Extremadura
- Province: Badajoz
- Municipality: La Coronada

Area
  - Total: 81 km^{2} (31 sq mi)
- Elevation: 356 m (1,168 ft)

Population (2025-01-01)
  - Total: 2,136
  - Density: 26/km^{2} (68/sq mi)
- Time zone: UTC+1 (CET)
  - Summer (DST): UTC+2 (CEST)

La Coronada is a municipality located in the province of Badajoz, Extremadura, Spain. According to the 2014 census, the municipality has a population of 2197 inhabitants.

== See also ==
- List of municipalities in Badajoz
