= Pedro Beltrán (bishop) =

Spanish Roman Catholic prelate

Most Reverend Pedro Beltrán
- Bishop of Tui
- Church: Catholic Church
- Diocese: Diocese of Tui
- In office: 1487–1505
- Predecessor: Diego de Muros
- Successor: Juan de Sepúlveda
- Previous post: Bishop of Ciudad Rodrigo (1485–1505)

Personal details
- Died: 1505 Tui, Pontevedra, Spain

Pedro Beltrán (died 1505) was a Roman Catholic prelate who served as Bishop of Tui (1487–1505) and Bishop of Ciudad Rodrigo (1485–1505).

== Biography ==
In 1485, Pedro Beltrán was appointed during the papacy of Pope Innocent VIII as Bishop of Ciudad Rodrigo. In 1487, he was appointed during the papacy of Pope Innocent VIII as Bishop of Tui. He served as Bishop of Tui until his death in 1505.

== See also ==
- Catholic Church in Spain

== External links and additional sources ==
- Cheney, David M. "Diocese of Ciudad Rodrigo". Catholic-Hierarchy.org. (for Chronology of Bishops) ^{[self-published]}
- Chow, Gabriel. "Diocese of Ciudad Rodrigo". GCatholic.org. (for Chronology of Bishops) ^{[self-published]}
- Cheney, David M. "Diocese of Tui-Vigo". Catholic-Hierarchy.org. (for Chronology of Bishops) ^{[self-published]}
- Chow, Gabriel. "Diocese of Tui-Vigo (Spain)". GCatholic.org. (for Chronology of Bishops) ^{[self-published]}

Catholic Church titles
Preceded by Alfonso de Paradinas	Bishop of Ciudad Rodrigo; 1485–1505	Succeeded by Diego de Muros
Preceded by Diego de Muros	Bishop of Tui; 1487–1505	Succeeded by Juan de Sepúlveda
