= Treaty of Ágreda (1162) =

In September 1162, King Alfonso II of Aragon and King Ferdinand II of León signed a treaty at Ágreda. It affirmed the treaty of Tudilén signed by their fathers in 1151. The two kings committed themselves to the conquest and division of the Kingdom of Navarre. Alfonso, who was a child, recognized Ferdinand's superiority, admitting his title "king of the Spains" (Latin rex Ispaniarum) and placing himself and his land under Ferdinand's "defense and wardship". Ferdinand took the title "tutor" and betrothed his new ward to his sister, Sancha. The Leonese prelate Pedro Gudestéiz was one of the treaty's negotiators.

The treaty was a triumph for Ferdinand, who took advantage of the fact that the kings of both Aragon and Castile at the time were children. He was accompanied to Ágreda by many Castilian prelates, including the archbishop of Toledo, John of Segovia. The treaty of Ágreda negated both the proposed marriage of Alfonso to Mafalda of Portugal and the clause in Alfonso's father's will that gave his guardianship to King Henry II of England.

The treaty worsened Alfonso's relations with Castile. It was abrogated by Alfonso II in 1169, when he signed the treaty of Sangüesa with Navarre. Nevertheless, the marriage to Sancha was celebrated in 1174.

== Bibliography ==
- Barton, Thomas W. (2019). Victory's Shadow: Conquest and Governance in Medieval Catalonia. Cornell University Press.
- Fletcher, Richard A. (1977). "Regalian Right in Twelfth-Century Spain: The Case of Archbishop Martín of Santiago de Compostela". The Journal of Ecclesiastical History. 28 (4): 337–360. doi:10.1017/s0022046900041646.
- Fletcher, Richard A. (1978). The Episcopate in the Kingdom of León in the Twelfth Century. Oxford University Press.
- Linehan, Peter (2011). Spain, 1157–1300: A Partible Inheritance. Wiley-Blackwell.
- Vela Aulesa, Carles; Riu i Riu, Manuel; Ferrer i Mallol, Maria Teresa (2018). "La política ibèrica de Barcelona i la Corona d'Aragó (segle XI – 1213)". In Maria Teresa Ferrer i Mallol; Manuel Riu i Riu (eds.). Tractats i negociacions diplomàtiques de Catalunya i de la Corona catalanoaragonesa a l'edat mitjana. Vol. 1.2: Tractats i negociacions diplomàtiques amb els regnes peninsulars i l'Àndalus (segle XI – 1213). Barcelona: Institut d'Estudis Catalans. pp. 19–115.
