= Diego de Muros (bishop of Ciudad Rodrigo) =

Spanish Roman Catholic prelate

Most Reverend Diego de Muros
- Bishop of Ciudad Rodrigo
- Church: Catholic Church
- Diocese: Diocese of Ciudad Rodrigo
- In office: 1487–1492
- Predecessor: Pedro Beltrán (bishop)
- Successor: Juan Ortega Bravo de la Laguna
- Previous post: Bishop of Tui (1472–1487)

Orders
- Consecration: 31 January 1473 by Šimun Vosić

Personal details
- Born: 1405 Muros, A Coruña, Spain
- Died: 1492 (aged 86–87) Ciudad Rodrigo, Spain

Diego de Muros (also Diego de Moiras) (1405–1492) was a Roman Catholic prelate who served as Bishop of Ciudad Rodrigo (1487–1492) and Bishop of Tui (1472–1487). He was one of three bishops of Spain of the same name who served contemporaneously, the others being Diego de Muros (Bishop of Islas Canarias) and Diego de Muros (bishop of Oviedo).

== Biography ==
Diego de Muros was born in Muros, A Coruña, Spain and ordained a priest in the Order of the Blessed Virgin Mary of Mercy. On 15 June 1472, he was appointed during the papacy of Pope Sixtus IV as Bishop of Tui. On 31 January 1473, he was consecrated bishop by Šimun Vosić, Archbishop of Bar, with Deodato Bocconi, Bishop of Ajaccio, and Giovanni Andrea de Bussi, Bishop of Aleria, serving as co-consecrators. On 1 June 1487, he was appointed during the papacy of Pope Innocent VIII as Bishop of Ciudad Rodrigo. He served as Bishop of Ciudad Rodrigo until his death in 1492.

== See also ==
- Diego de Muros (Bishop of Islas Canarias)
- Diego de Muros (bishop of Oviedo)

== External links and additional sources ==
- Cheney, David M. "Diocese of Tui-Vigo". Catholic-Hierarchy.org. (for Chronology of Bishops) ^{[self-published]}
- Chow, Gabriel. "Diocese of Tui-Vigo (Spain)". GCatholic.org. (for Chronology of Bishops) ^{[self-published]}
- Cheney, David M. "Diocese of Ciudad Rodrigo". Catholic-Hierarchy.org. (for Chronology of Bishops) ^{[self-published]}
- Chow, Gabriel. "Diocese of Ciudad Rodrigo". GCatholic.org. (for Chronology of Bishops) ^{[self-published]}

Catholic Church titles
Preceded by Pedro Fernández de Solís	Bishop of Tui; 1472–1487	Succeeded by Pedro Beltrán (bishop)
Preceded by Pedro Beltrán (bishop)	Bishop of Ciudad Rodrigo; 1487–1492	Succeeded by Juan Ortega Bravo de la Laguna
