= Primiclerus =

Ecclesiastical title in Spain

Primiclerus was an ecclesiastical title in Spain between the 7th and 12th centuries.

The term first appears with the spelling primiclerius in a letter of Isidore of Seville to Braulio of Zaragoza dated between 620 and 635. A primiclerius named Silicolus is mentioned in the acts of the Ninth Council of Toledo in 655. Two canons of the Council of Mérida of 666 legislate regarding the office. Every bishop was enjoined to have an archpresbyter, archdeacon and primiclerius. The office existed in the province of Gallia Narbonensis north of the Pyrenees, as attested in the Historia Wambae (c. 675) of Julian of Toledo. A primiclerius signed the acts of the Fifteenth Council of Toledo in 688. Spelled primiclericus, the office is mentioned in the Liber ordinum, which was probably in force in late Visigothic Spain, although only attested in 11th-century manuscripts. The office seems to have continued for some time in the formerly Visigothic territories of the Carolingian Empire. An ordination rite for the office is preserved in the Pontifical of Vic, an 11th-century pontifical of the Hispanic Rite, now in Vic, Museu Episcopal, MS 104.

After a lacuna in the sources, the title reappears in the kingdom of Asturias in 905, albeit now usually spelled primiclerus (sometimes primusclerus). It appears first in the diocese of Oviedo, where it was used until 1154. It is attested in the diocese of León from 918 to 1120 and in Santiago de Compostela from 999 until 1136. It was also used in the monastery of Sahagún from 920 to 1064 and in the monastery of San Vicente de Oviedo between 1039 and 1149. It was not used in churches further east nor outside of Spain (save for two isolated incidents in Catalonia and southern Italy).

The title, combining primus (first) and clerus (clergy), is analogous to several other titles formed in the late Roman Empire, such as primicerius, primipilus, primivirgius and primiscrinius. It probably originated as a calque on the title primicerius. The same Silicolus who was identified as a primiclerius in 655 was called a primicerius at the Eighth Council of Toledo in 653. The office may have been the same. The primiclerus seems to have had charge of the lesser clergy of the cathedral, such as acolytes, exorcists, cantors and lectors. When the term disappears in the 12th century, it is usually replaced by cantor and precentor.
