= Aranga =

Concello de Aranga
- Municipality
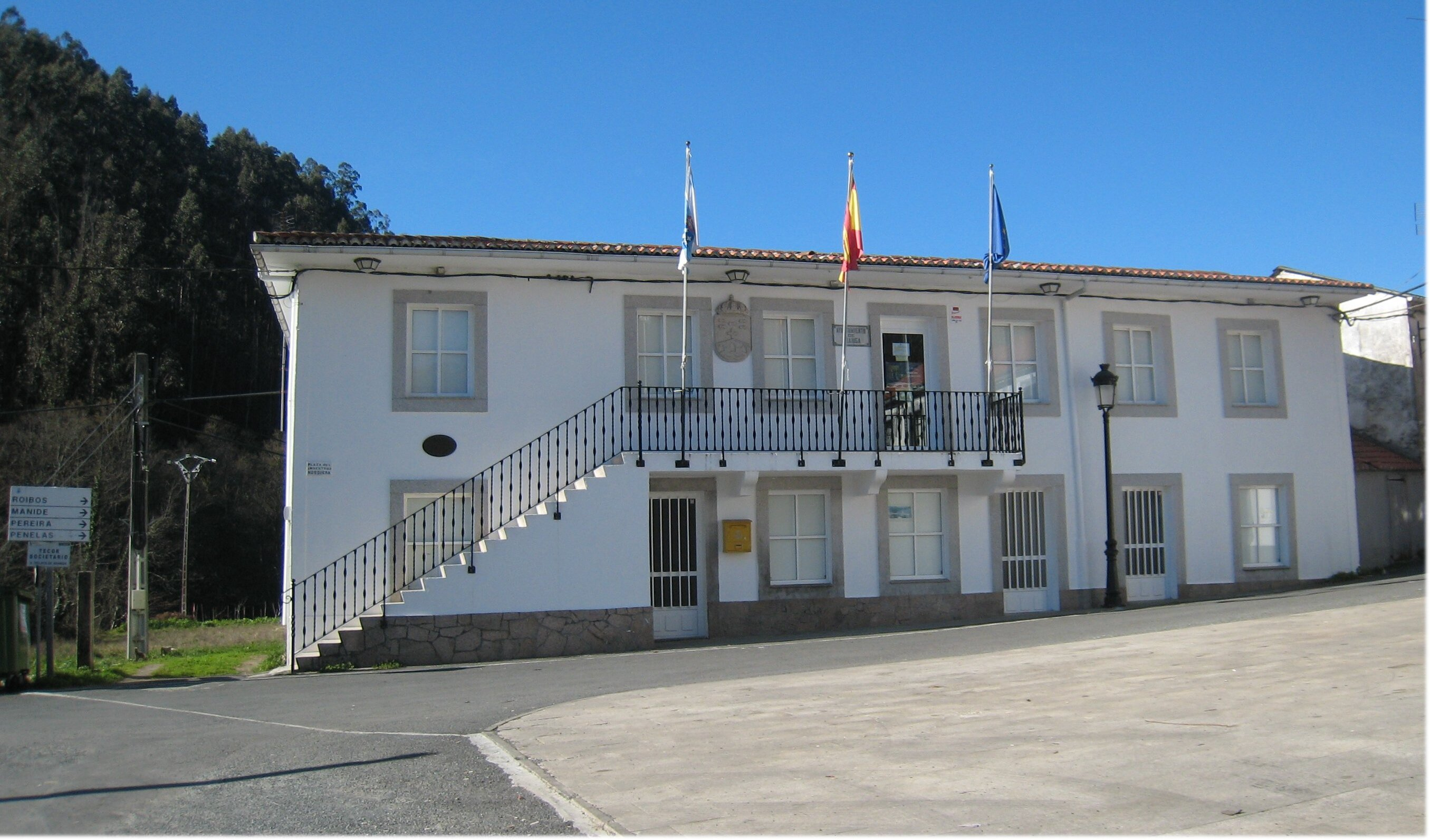

- Coat of arms

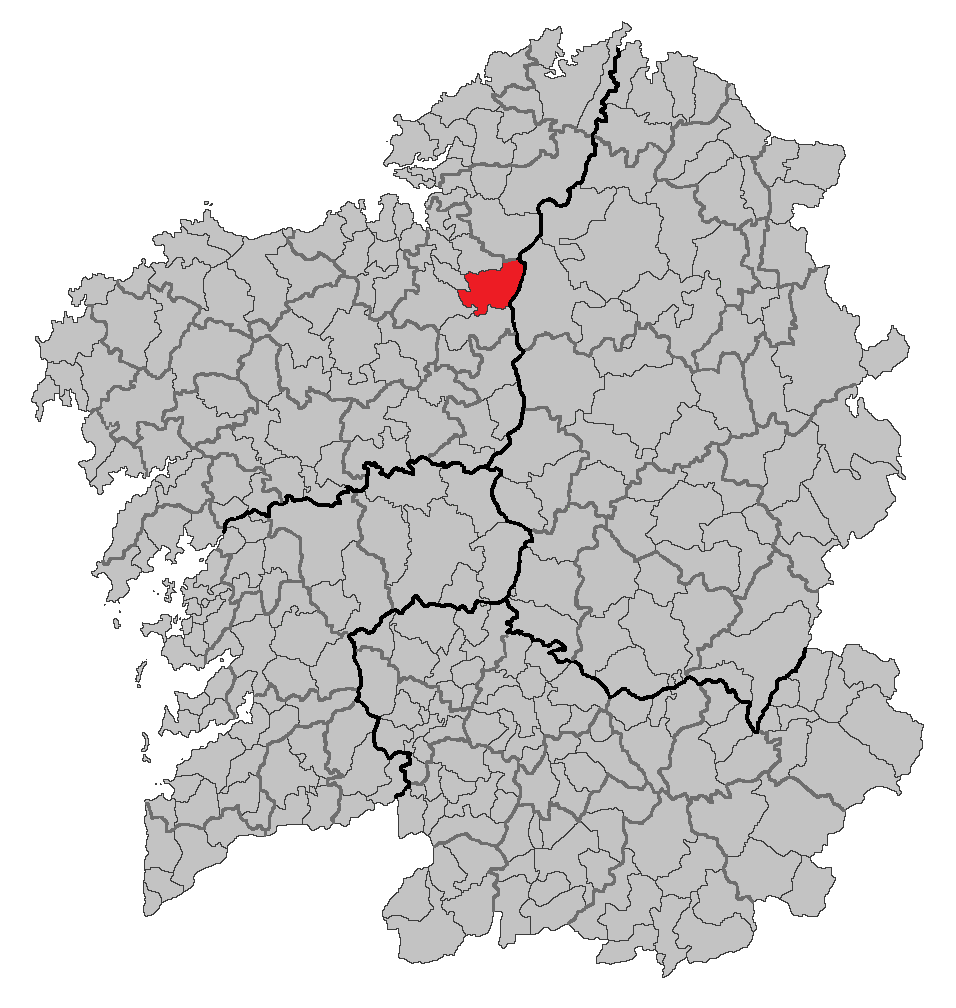
- Situation of Aranga within Galicia
- Coordinates: 43°14′2″N 8°0′57″W
- Country: Spain

Area
  - Total: 120.49 km^{2} (46.52 sq mi)

Population (2024)
  - Total: 1,799
  - Density: 14.93/km^{2} (38.67/sq mi)
- Time zone: UTC+1 (CET)
  - Summer (DST): UTC+2 (CEST)

Aranga is a municipality belonging to the comarca of Betanzos in the autonomous community of Galicia, Spain in the province of A Coruña with an area of 120.49 km^{2} (46.52 mi^{2}) and a population of 1799 inhabitants (INE, 2024).

== Toponym ==
The origin of the place name "Aranga" derives, according to all studies, from the pre-Indo-European form "ara-". This particle defines a relief characterized by a valley enclosed by a river course. Without a doubt, it refers to the valley formed by the Mandeo river as it passes through the parish of San Paio de Aranga.

== Geography ==
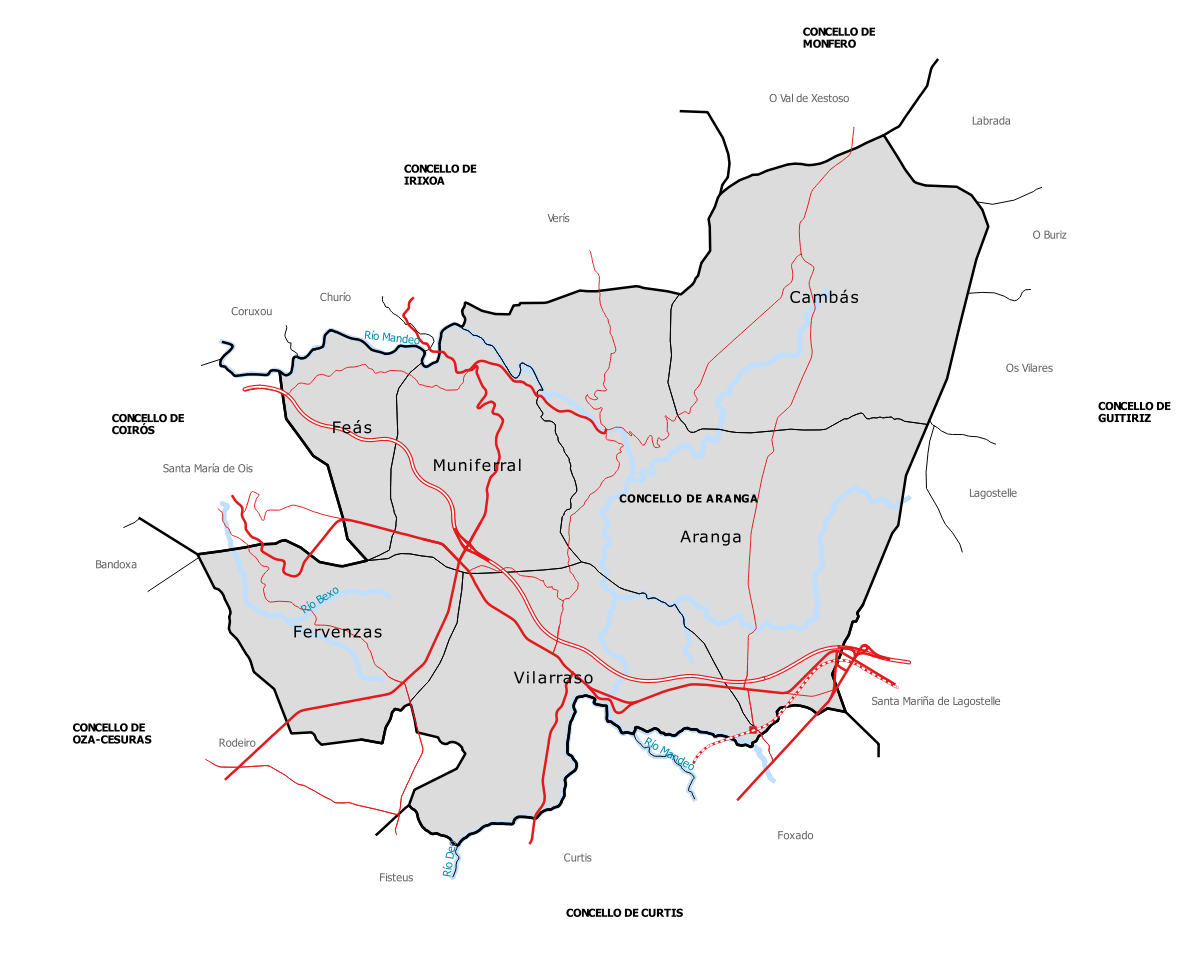
Map of Aranga and its parishes

=== Situation ===
It has an area of 119.6 km^{2}. It borders the municipalities of Guitiriz (of the province of Lugo), Curtis, Oza-Cesuras, Coirós, Irixoa and Monfero. The municipality is crossed by the Mandeo River. It is located 40 km southeast of the provincial capital. It has an average altitude of 262 m above sea level.

It is one of the only two municipalities in the province of A Coruña that is considered a marginal rural municipality (the agricultural population exceeds 70% of the total active population).

== Demography ==
It is one of the only two municipalities in the province of A Coruña that is considered a marginal rural municipality (the agricultural population exceeds 70% of the total active population).

Historical population
Year	Pop.	±%
1900	4,710	—
1930	4,980	+5.7%
1950	4,618	−7.3%
1981	2,723	−41.0%
2004	2,274	−16.5%
2024	1,799	−20.9%

== See also ==
List of municipalities in A Coruña
