= Miño, A Coruña =

Town located in the Province of A Coruña

Coordinates: 43°20′51″N 8°12′23″W

Miño
- Municipality
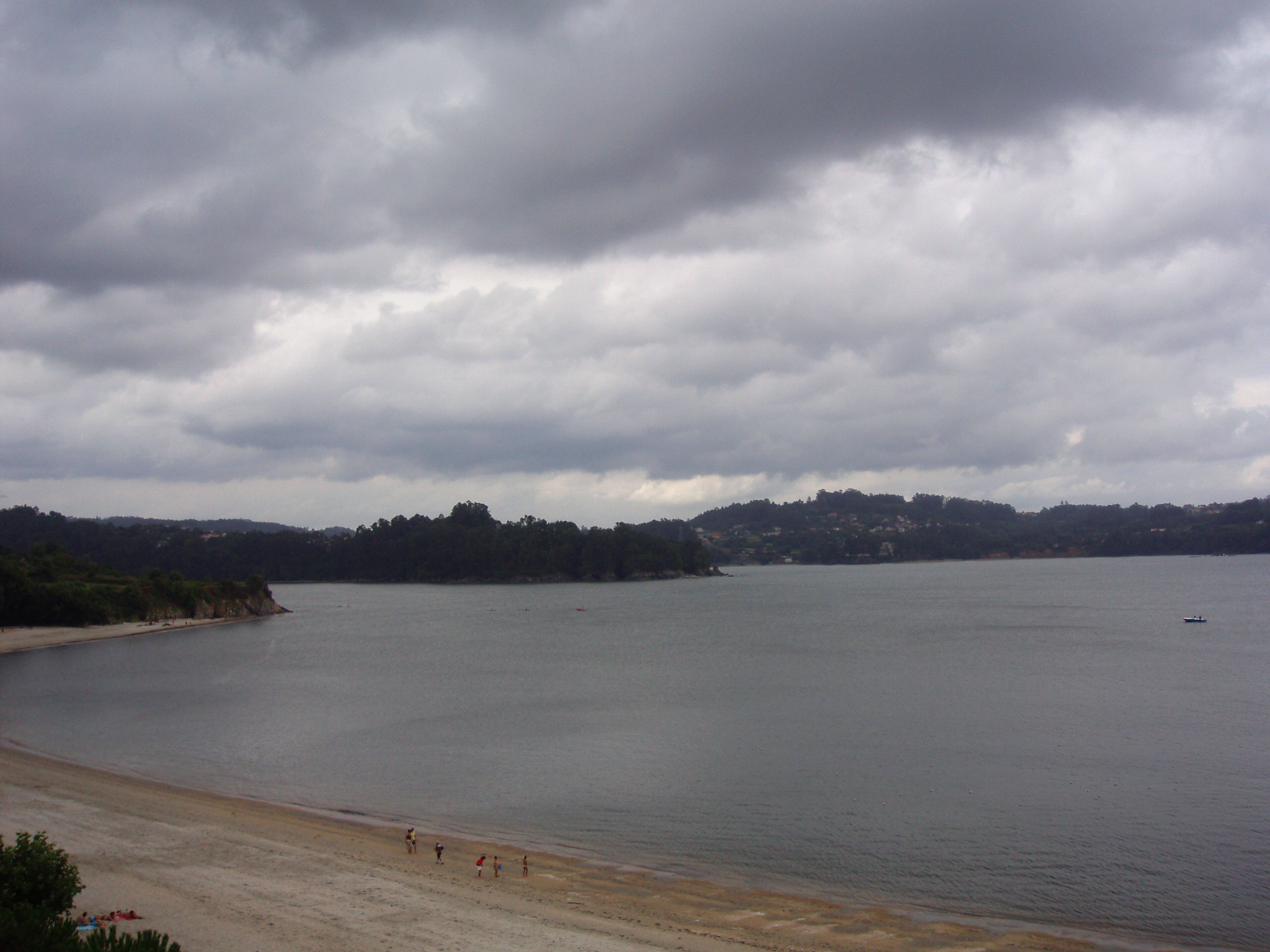

- Coat of arms

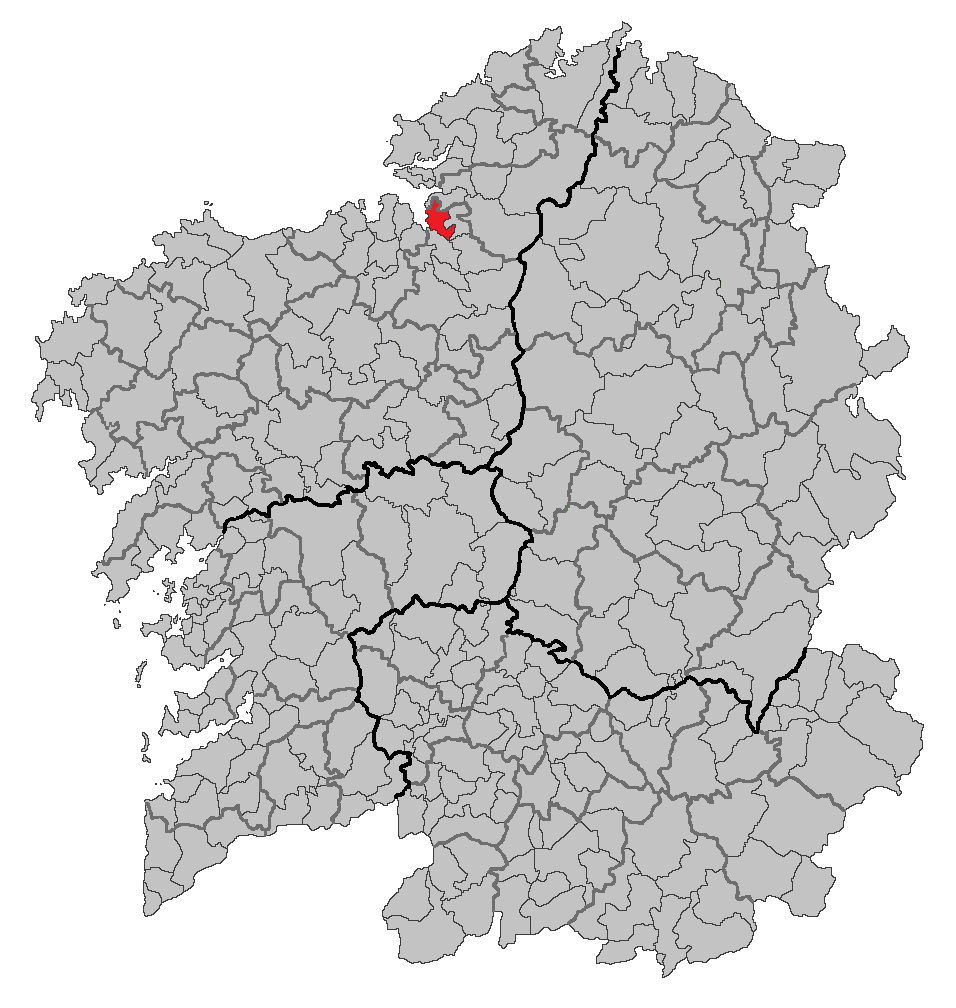
- Location of Miño

- Location in Spain
- Country: Spain
- Autonomous community: Galicia
- Province: A Coruña
- Comarca: Betanzos

Government
  - Alcalde: Manuel Vázquez Faraldo (Socialists' Party of Galicia)
- Demonym: Miñes
- Time zone: UTC+1 (CET)
  - Summer (DST): UTC+2 (CEST)
- Postal code: 15...
- Website: Official website

Miño is a municipality in the province of A Coruña, in the autonomous community of Galicia, Spain. It belongs to the comarca of Betanzos. It has a population of 6,946 (Galician 2024 Census) and an area of 35.9 km^{2}.

== Geography ==
The municipality, with an area of 32.97 km^{2}, covers eight parishes: Bemantes, Callobre, Carantoña, Leiro, Castro, Miño, Perbes and Vilanova. It borders Pontedeume to the north, Vilarmaior to the east, Paderne and Irixoa to the south, and Betanzos estuary to the west. It is located 25 km from the provincial capital, and 72 km from Santiago de Compostela. The municipality is crossed by the English Way of St. James.

=== Hidrography ===
The Lambre River flows through the municipality, which after crossing the Porco Bridge forms the Alameda Beach, the Xarío River, which crosses the parishes of Vilanova and Perbes and flows next to the Grande Beach, and the Baxoi River, which also flows into the Grande Beach and receives this name because of its passage over the Baxoi Bridge. There is a Gothic fountain and a picnic area on its banks for pilgrims heading to Compostela to rest.

== History ==
The oldest remains found in Miño correspond to the castrexa era and the remains of a Roman port. In 1916, 1500 Roman coins were found in the parish of Perbes, the Algara treasure. The municipality was established in 1836 as Castro, the name of one of the parishes of the Old Regime that made up the municipality, dependent on the jurisdictions of Pontedeume, Callobre, Vilachá, Leiro and Perbes, which belonged to the province of Betanzos. In 1919, the consistory was moved to the parish of Miño and with it the name of the municipality also changed. Currently, it continues to have its headquarters in the same parish, in the nucleus called A Carreira.

== Demography ==
Evolución da población de Miño Fontes: INE e IGE.
1900	1930	1950	1981	2004	2009	2011	2012	2013	2014	2015	2016	2017	2018	2019	2020	2021	2022	2023
4.923	5.326	5.823	5.476	5.089	5.488	5.760	5.739	5.786	5.838				6.056					
(Census registration criteria varied between 1900 and 2004, and INE and IGE data may not match.)

== Culture ==
=== Heritage ===
==== Archaeological heritage ====
From the castro culture the castro of Loios, castro of Ombre, Centroña, Insua, Santa María de Castro, Carantoña and Leiro are preserved.

==== Architectural heritage ====
The church of San Xoán de Vilanova is of Romanesque origin. Construction began in 1040, with the façade being rebuilt in the 18th century. Its semicircular apse has been restored. The church of Santa María de Castro dates back to the 16th century. Over the Lambre and Vixoi rivers (today the Baxoi river), there are two 15th-century bridges, ordered to be built by Fernán Peres de Andrade o Boo (the Kind), lord of Pontedeume. The one that crosses the Lambre river, with a single ogival-style arch, is known as Ponte do Porco, for having carved a boar, the symbol of the Andrade family. In Bañobre is the pazo of the Counts of Vigo, which preserves original 18th-century elements on its façade.

=== Ethnography ===
==== Festivities and celebrations ====
In the majority of the parochies the main festivity celebrates a saint (the most common being dedicated for Saint John the Baptist, Virgin of Carmel, Corpus Christi, Saint James, and so on.)

== Economy ==
=== Infrastructure ===
The municipality is connected by the N-651 national road that goes from Betanzos to Ferrol and by the AP-9 motorway with direct access, which connects with the cities of the Atlantic coast. It is crossed by the Ferrol-Betanzos Infesta railway line that connects with the one that goes from A Coruña to Lugo, and has the Miño station and the Perbes station.

== Tourism ==
Miño is host of known beaches such as Perbes Beach and Grande Beach [both have the Blue Flag] (informally considered the same beach as Praia Grande de Perbes "Great Beach of Perbes"). But the municipality has also made itself infamous for the Costa Miño.

=== Urbanism (and the Costa Miño fiasco) ===
The urban development dynamics in the municipality of Miño have led to the current urban center of Miño, with the structure of a town that has developed along a road (N-651), while at the same time experiencing significant growth with the construction of large residential developments far from the urban center and the services provided by the town center. One of these, Costa Miño Golf, with 1,200 homes (unfinished), extends through Perbes and San Juan de Villanueva. The aforementioned development has consisted of the construction of apartment blocks replacing low-rise houses, with one or two floors, instead of expanding outwards to form a consolidated rural nucleus, surrounded by condominiums.

All of this has led to the disappearance of the houses with plots that once made up the urban core. Urban development has thus been somewhat chaotic, as the land in many cases came from former orchards. The most controversial case has been the expropriation of land in Perbes for the construction of the aforementioned housing development. The expropriation method was used to construct a private space, and in some cases, the corresponding compensation to the former owners was not paid.

During the COVID-19 pandemic interest on Costa Miño returned. After years of stagnation, cranes have returned to this sprawling development, which for years was a prime example of the Spanish real estate crisis. In 2025, several construction projects were underway and Costa Miño transformed from a summer resort into a neighbourhood. On October of the same year the city council granted a 30-year concession for the Costa Miño Golf commercial area to the Gadis supermarket chain, which was formalized in January 2026.

== Miño in popular culture ==
Pasei a ponte do Porco,

paseille a man polo lombo,

meu divino San Andrés

o voso camiño é longo.

== See also ==
List of municipalities in A Coruña
