= Ponte do Pedrido =

Coordinates: 43°19′40″N 8°12′32″W

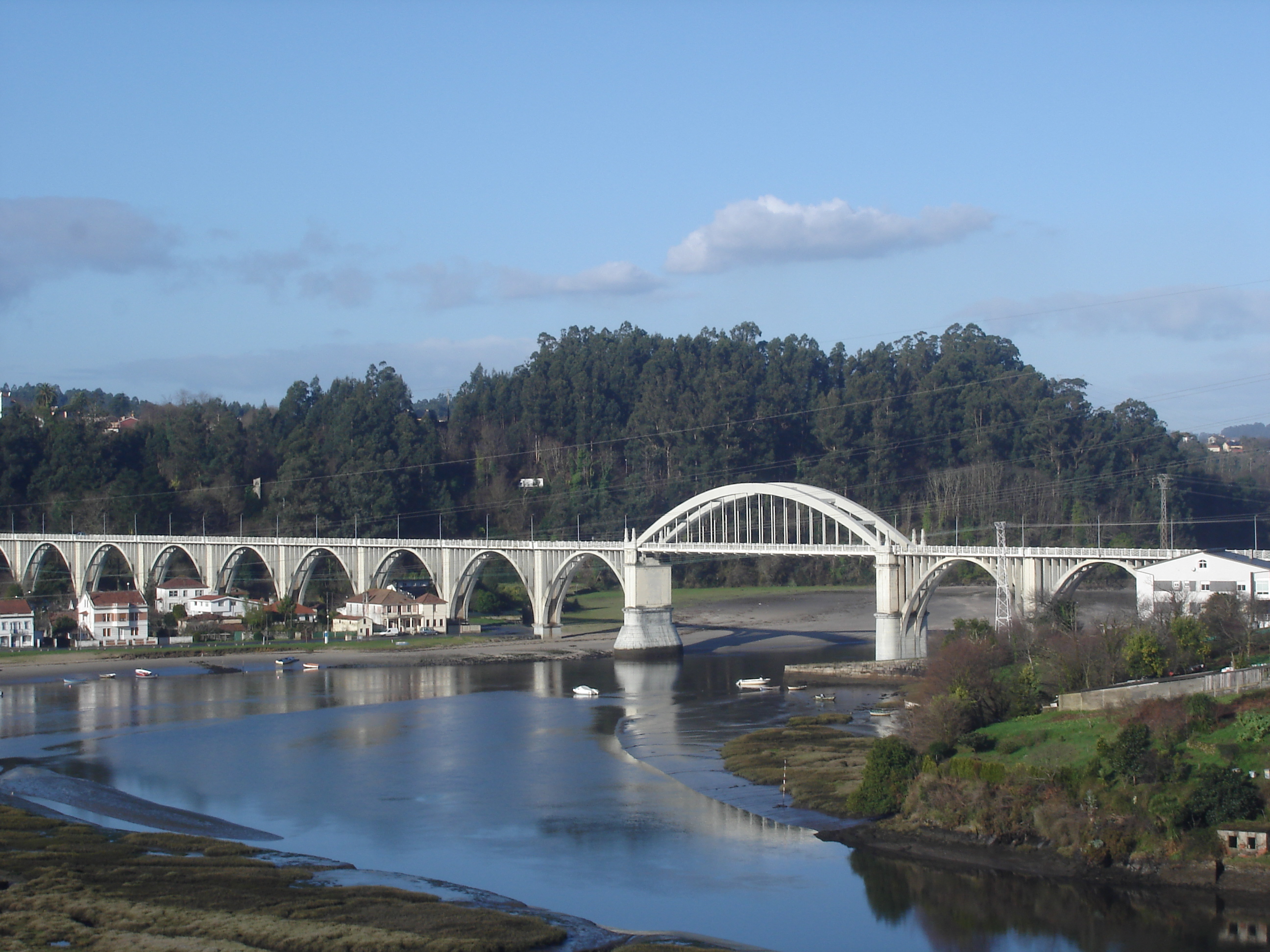

Ponte do Pedrido is a bridge in the Province of A Coruña, Galicia, Spain. It was built between 1939 and 1942, and opened in 16 April 1943. The 520.4 metre bridge connects Bergondo to Paderne.
