= Pazo de Montecelo =

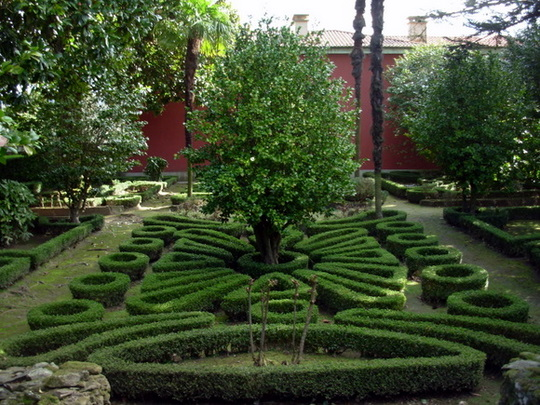
- Part of the French gardens.
- Interactive map of the Pazo de Montecelo area

General information
- Location: Paderne, Galicia, Spain

Pazo de Montecelo is a pazo (manor house) in Paderne, Province of A Coruña, Galicia, Spain. It contains French gardens.
