= List of municipalities in A Coruña =

Map of Spain with A Coruña highlighted

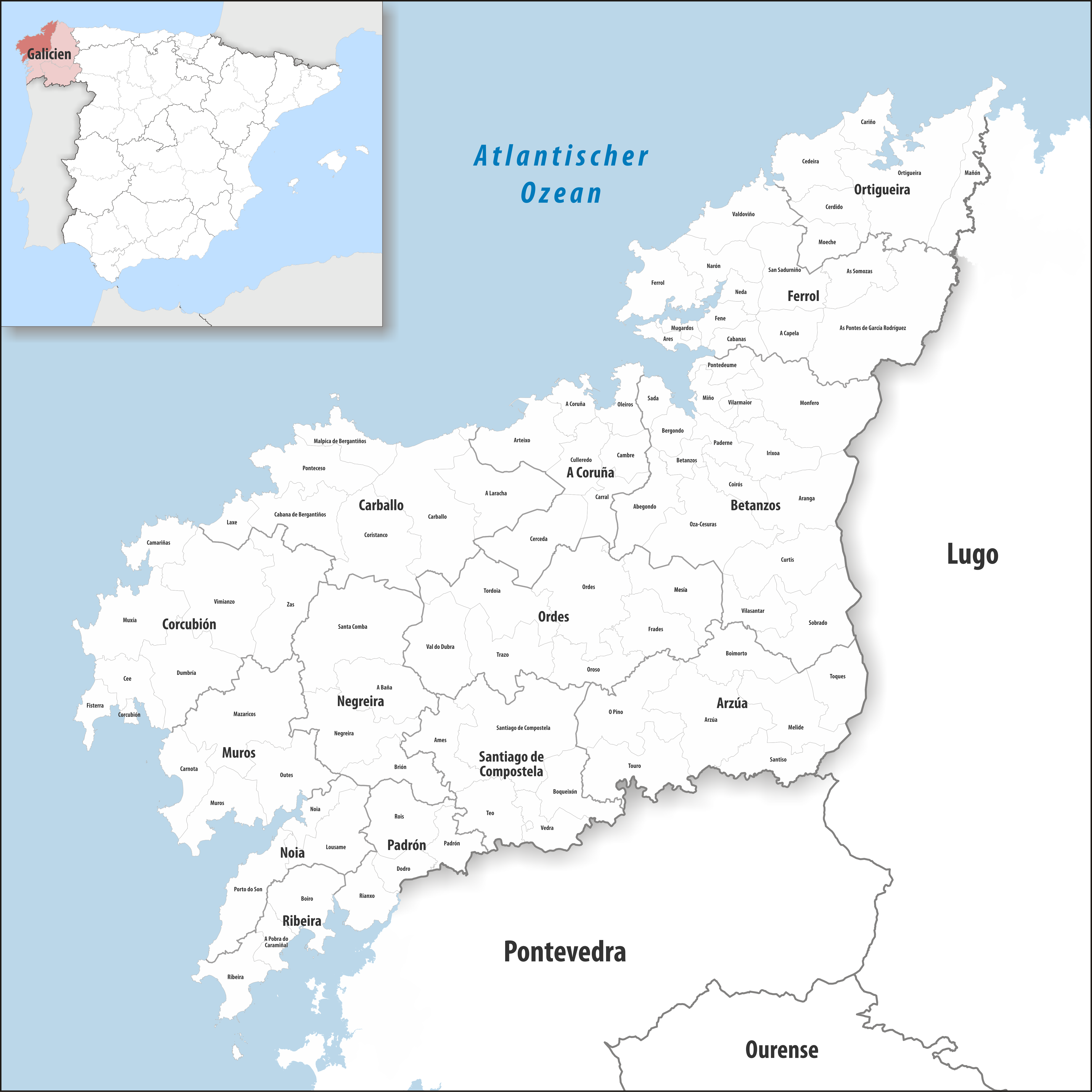
Map of the municipalities in the province of A Coruña

A Coruña is a province in the autonomous community of Galicia, Spain, that is divided into 93 municipalities. As of the 2024 Spanish census, the province is the 12th largest by population, with 1,128,320 inhabitants, and the 32nd largest by land area, spanning 7,950 square kilometres (3,070 sq mi). Municipalities are the basic local political division in Spain and can only belong to one province. They enjoy a large degree of autonomy in their local administration, being in charge of tasks such as urban planning, water supply, lighting, roads, local police, and firefighting.

The organisation of municipalities in Spain is outlined in a local government law (Spanish: Ley 7/1985, de 2 de abril, Reguladora de las Bases del Régimen Local; transl. Law 7/1985, of 2 April, Regulating the Bases of the Local Administration) passed on 2 April 1985 and finalised by an 18 April 1986 royal decree. The Statute of Autonomy of A Coruña also contains provisions concerning the relations between the municipalities and the autonomous government of A Coruña. All citizens of Spain are required to register in the municipality in which they reside. Each municipality is a corporation with independent legal personhood: its governing body is called the ayuntamiento (municipal council or corporation), a term often also used to refer to the municipal offices (city and town halls). The ayuntamiento is composed of the mayor (Spanish: alcalde), the deputy mayors (tenientes de alcalde) and the plenary assembly (pleno) of councillors (concejales). Municipalities are categorised by population for the purpose of determining the number of councillors: three when the population is up to 100 inhabitants, five for 101–250, seven for 251–1,000, nine for 1,001–2,000, eleven for 2,001–5,000, thirteen for 5,001–10,000, seventeen for 10,001–20,000, twenty-one for 20,001–50,000, and twenty-five for 50,001–100,000.

The mayor and the deputy mayors are elected by the plenary assembly, which is itself elected by universal suffrage. Elections in municipalities with more than 250 inhabitants are carried out following a proportional representation system with closed lists, whilst those with a population lower than 250 use a block plurality voting system with open lists. The plenary assembly must meet periodically at the seat of the ayuntamiento, with meetings occurring more or less frequently depending on the population of the municipality: monthly for those whose population is larger than 20,000, once every two months if it ranges between 5,001 and 20,000, and once every three months if it does not exceed 5,000. Many ayuntamientos also have a local governing board (Spanish: junta de gobierno local), which is named by the mayor from amongst the councillors and is required for municipalities of more than 5,000 inhabitants. The board, whose role is to assist the mayor between meetings of the plenary assembly, may not include more than one third of the councillors. The Galician name is the sole official although older or informal texts may use the Spanish language forms or spellings.

The largest municipality by population in the province as of the 2024 Spanish census is A Coruña, its capital, with 249,261 residents, while the smallest is Cerdido, with 1004 residents.

== List ==
Largest municipalities in the province of A Coruña by population

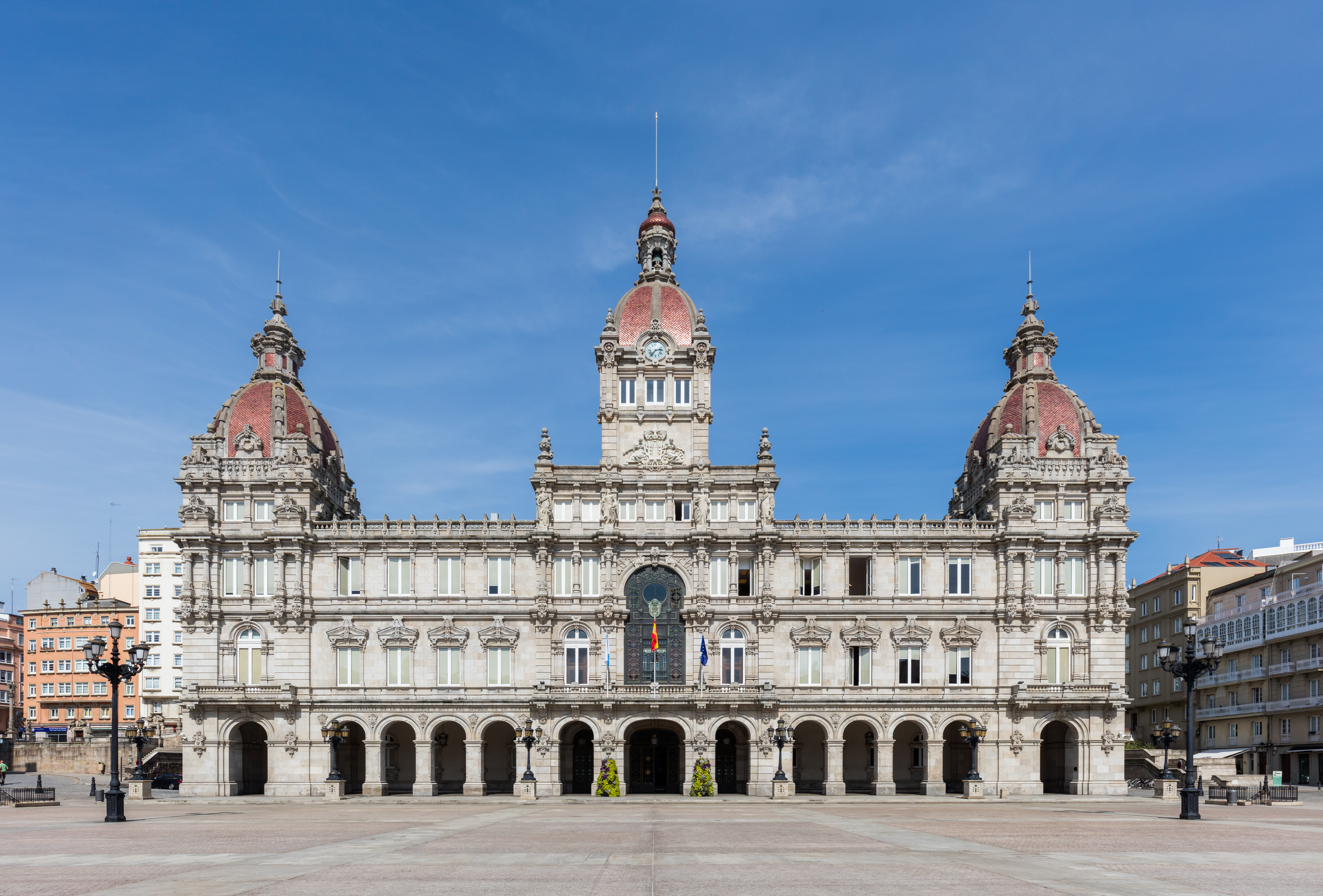
A Coruña is the capital and most populous municipality in the province of A Coruña

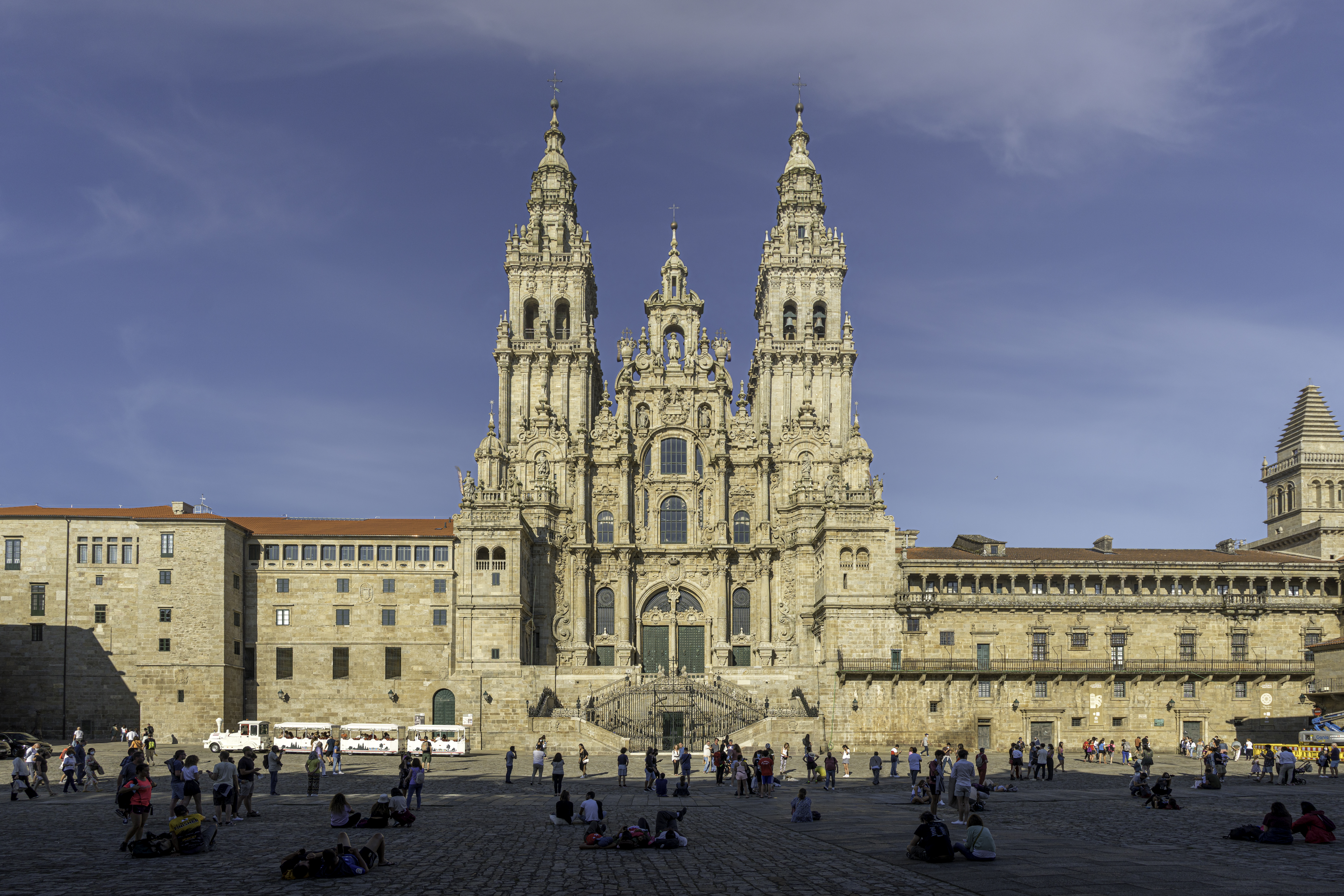
Santiago de Compostela is the second largest municipality in A Coruña by population

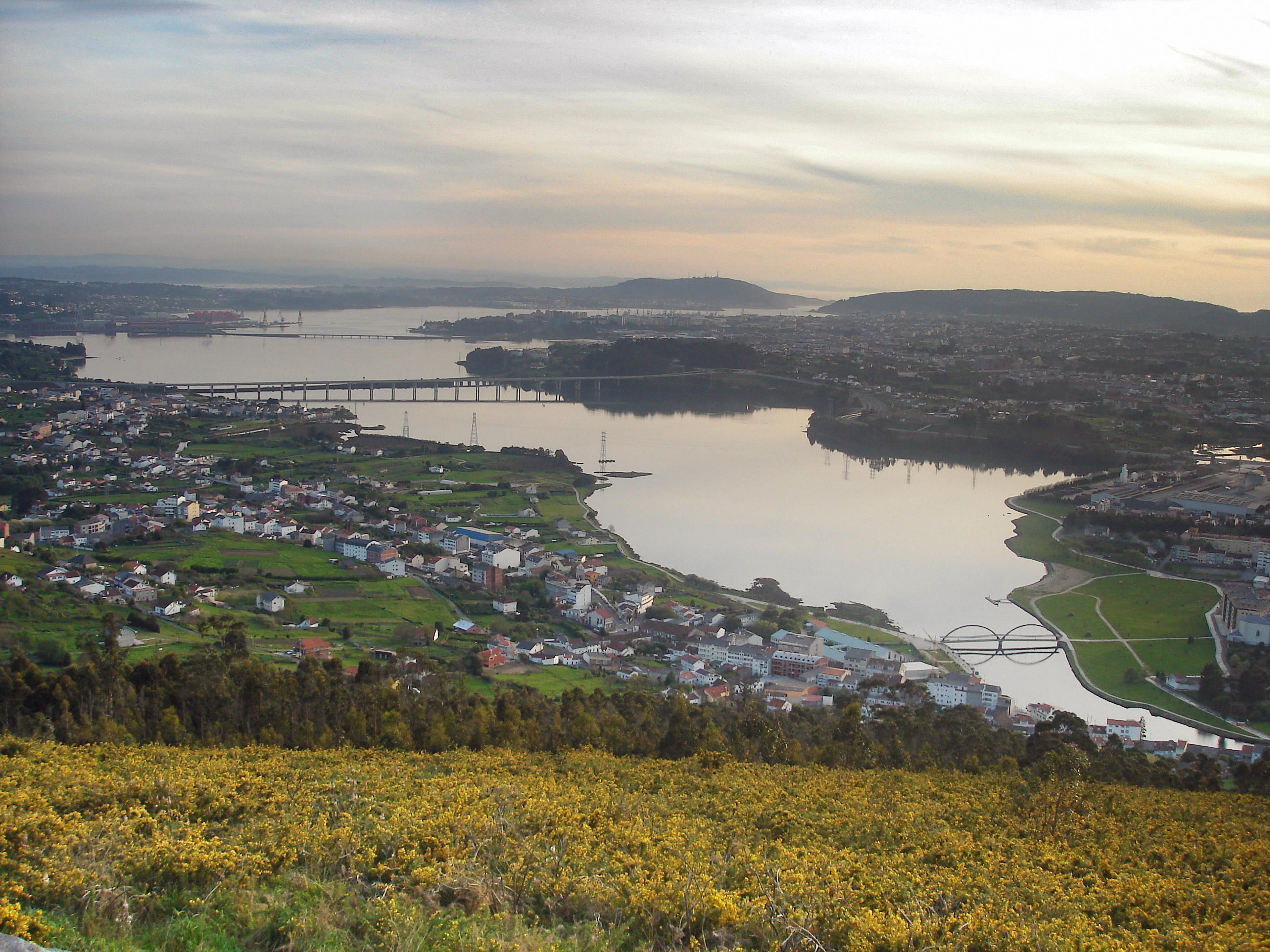
The third most populous municipality in A Coruña is Ferrol

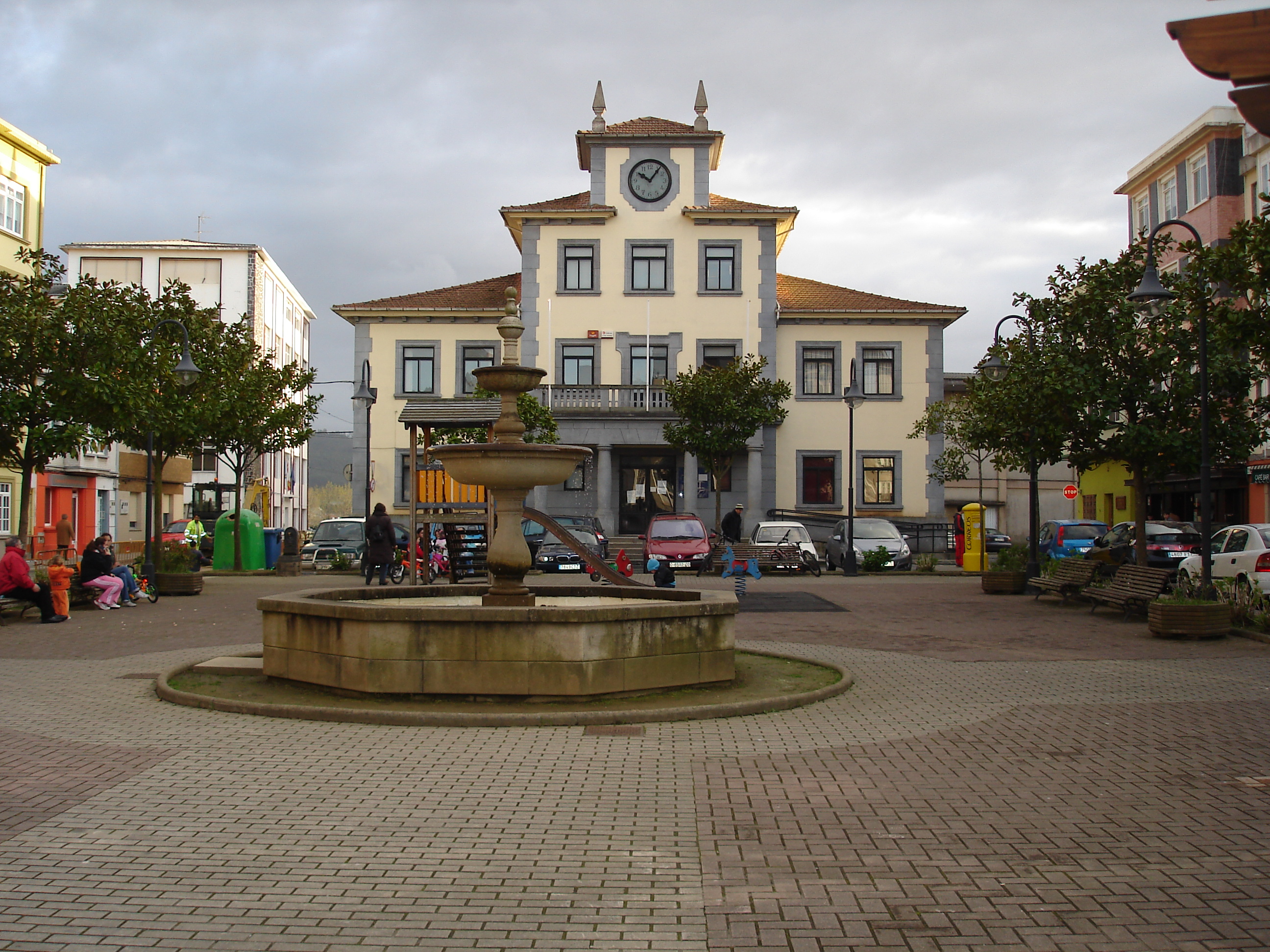
Narón is the fourth most populous municipality in A Coruña.

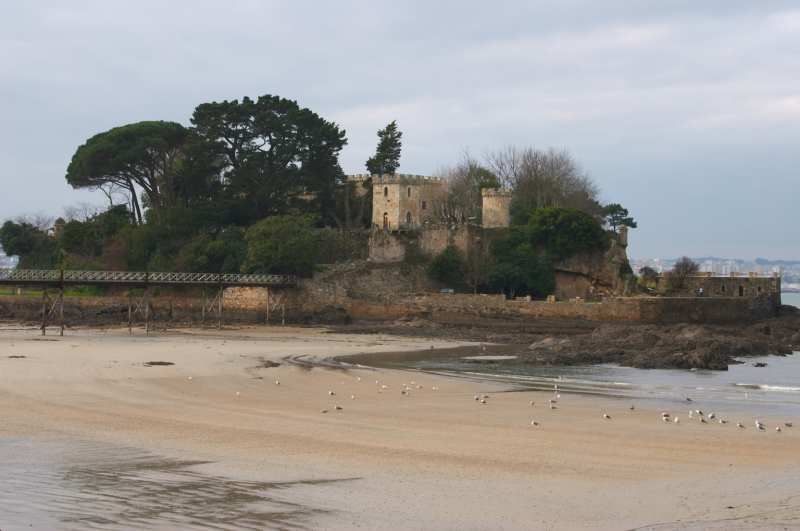
Oleiros, the fifth most populous municipality in A Coruña

Name	Population (2024)
Abegondo	5,578
Ames	32,812
Aranga	1,799
Ares	6,156
Arteixo	34,038
Arzúa	5,887
A Baña	3,291
Bergondo	6,986
Betanzos	13,261
Boimorto	1,801
Boiro	19,018
Boqueixón	4,200
Brión	8,197
Cabana de Bergantiños	4,098
Cabanas	3,296
Camariñas	5,098
Cambre	24,781
A Capela	1,182
Carballo	31,595
Cariño	3,691
Carnota	3,800
Carral	6,775
Cedeira	6,548
Cee	7,740
Cerceda	5,085
Cerdido	1,004
Coirós	1,931
Corcubión	1,678
Coristanco	5,744
A Coruña	249,261
Culleredo	31,085
Curtis	4,181
Dodro	2,620
Dumbría	2,776
Fene	12,530
Ferrol	64,218
Fisterra	4,704
Frades	2,163
Irixoa	1,326
A Laracha	11,603
Laxe	2,919
Lousame	3,099
Malpica de Bergantiños	5,267
Mañón	1,223
Mazaricos	3,719
Melide	7,734
Mesía	2,383
Miño	6,946
Moeche	1,200
Monfero	1,818
Mugardos	5,195
Muros	8,184
Muxía	4,380
Narón	39,285
Neda	4,868
Negreira	6,961
Noia	14,092
Oleiros	38,333
Ordes	12,772
Oroso	7,757
Ortigueira	5,418
Outes	6,049
Oza-Cesuras	5,151
Paderne	2,387
Padrón	8,256
O Pino	4,581
A Pobra do Caramiñal	9,184
Ponteceso	5,318
Pontedeume	7,456
As Pontes de García Rodríguez	9,782
Porto do Son	9,064
Rianxo	10,748
Ribeira	27,111
Rois	4,395
Sada	17,140
San Sadurniño	2,733
Santa Comba	9,319
Santiago de Compostela	99,536
Santiso	1,453
Sobrado	1,754
As Somozas	1,068
Teo	19,045
Toques	1,070
Tordoia	3,181
Touro	3,387
Trazo	2,979
Val do Dubra	3,734
Valdoviño	6,857
Vedra	4,942
Vilarmaior	1,252
Vilasantar	1,229
Vimianzo	6,808
Zas	4,261

== See also ==
- Geography of Spain
- List of municipalities of Spain
