= English Way =

Camino de Santiago pilgrimage routes starting in Galicia

The English Way / Camiño Inglés
- Route of the English Way
- Location: Galicia (Spain)
- Trailheads: Ferrol or A Coruna, Santiago de Compostela
- Use: Hiking
- Difficulty: Moderate
- Season: All Year

The English Way or Camino Inglés (Galician: Camiño Inglés and Spanish: Camino Inglés) is one of the paths of the Camino de Santiago. The Spanish section begins in the Galician port cities of Ferrol (110 kilometres or 68 miles) or A Coruña (75 kilometres or 47 miles), with multiple additional sections in the UK and Ireland, and continues south to Santiago de Compostela.

== Middle Ages ==
The English Way was a path of convenience for medieval pilgrims to reach Santiago de Compostela. Pilgrims from Scandinavia or other areas of Northern Europe would travel by ship instead of by foot or horseback. At least one Icelandic pilgrim is known to have followed this path in 1154. During times of conflict between France and other countries, especially England, this alternative saw exceptional traffic. During the Hundred Years' War (1337–1453) between the Kingdom of England and the Kingdom of France, the English Way became well-established as English pilgrims and traders would travel with permission of the English Crown to Galician ports and visit Santiago. Known pilgrim hospitals with significant English support were located in Sigüeiro, San Paio, Pontedeume, Betanzos, Bruma, Neda, Miño and Paderne.

== Modern revival ==
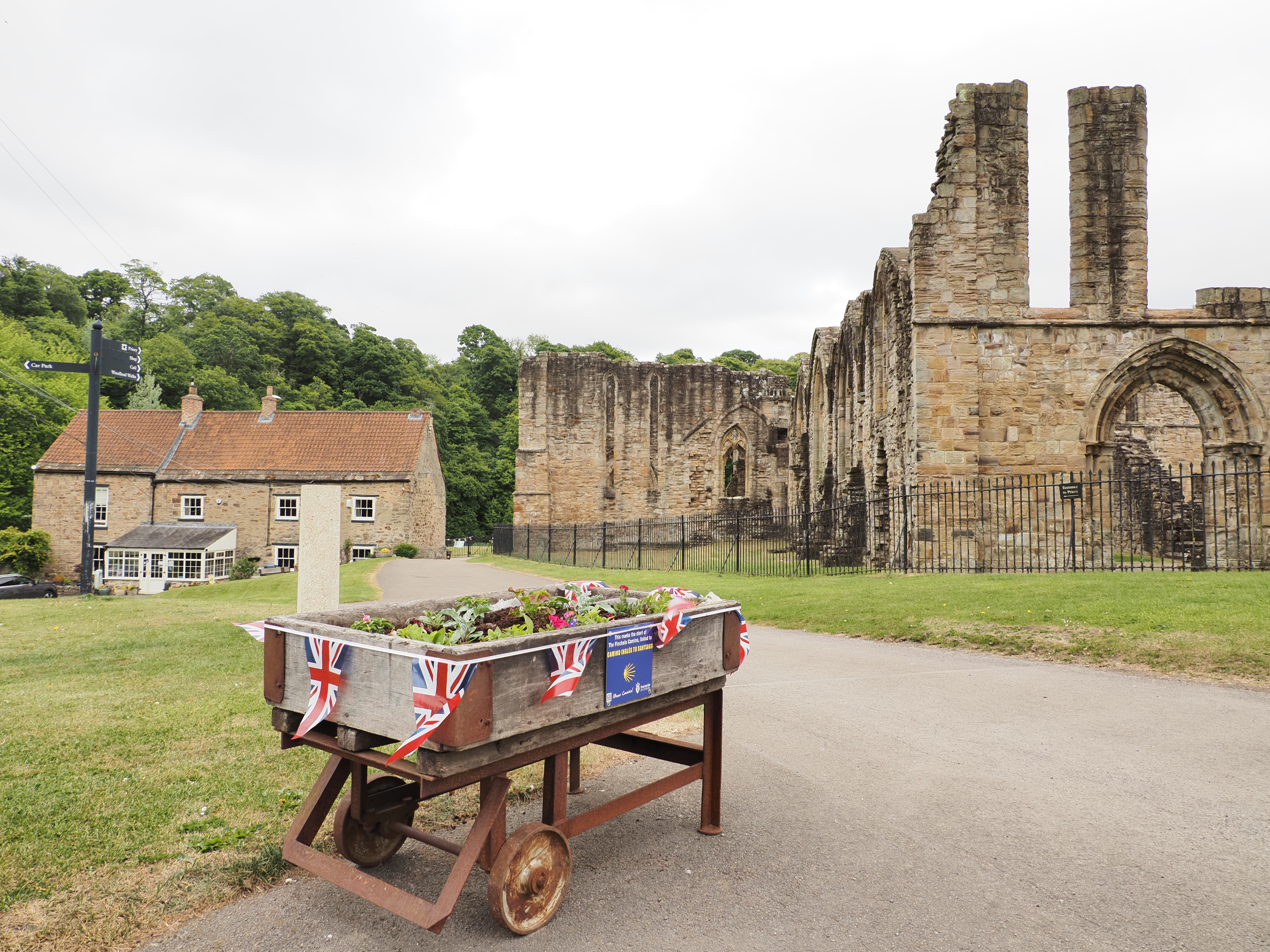
The start of the Camino Inglés in England at Finchale Priory

In the modern era the English Way has been revived as a much briefer alternative to the classic French Way. In order to receive the Compostela, the official certificate issued by the Cathedral of Santiago to confirm that a person has completed their pilgrimage, a minimum walk of 100 kilometres (62 miles) is required. Only Ferrol, at 110 kilometres (68 miles), is this distance from Santiago on the English Way in Spain, with the route from A Coruña brings only 75 kilometres (47 miles). However, from December 2016 the Compostela can also be obtained by those starting in A Coruña if they walk a minimum certified distance of 25 kilometres (16 miles) on a pilgrimage route with a connection to St James in their country of origin.

There are now a number of routes in Britain and Ireland that are set up to stamp the credencial, verifying the distance walked. These include the Finchale Camino Inglés, starting at Finchale Priory, the site of the hermitage of St Godric of Finchale, the earliest known English pilgrim to Compostela in the 12th century and now considered "the official starting point of the Camino Inglés in England" according to the Asociación de Concellos do Camiño Inglés. This route was officially recognised in 2019, running from Finchale Priory to the 7th century Escomb Church via Durham Cathedral and Bishop Auckland. The marked route is being extended south to eventually join with St James' Way from Reading, where Reading Abbey was the centre of the cult of St James in pre-Reformation England, to the port of Southampton; as of 2025 the Finchale Camino Inglés reaches as far as Hull. It is planned to continue the route through Lincolnshire using the established Viking Way (Hull to Rutland via Lincoln) and the Queen Eleanor Crosses Way (Lincoln to London via Northampton) to extend the route towards Oxford, where the St Frideswide’s Way already connects to the St James' Way in Reading.

While the Finchale Camino Inglés and the St James' Way are the only two parts of the Camino Inglés outside of Spain to be included in the guide from the Asociación Galega de Amigos do Camiño de Santiago, there are twelve other routes in the UK recognised by the Confraternity of St James as having links to St James, and nine Celtic Camino routes in Ireland suggested by the Camimo Society Ireland.

== Statistics ==
In 2024, about 26,800 pilgrims (5.6% of the total number of pilgrims arriving to the Pilgrims' Reception Office of the Cathedral of Santiago de Compostela) walked the English Way. It is the fourth most often walked route. The majority of pilgrims has a Spanish nationality (52%), followed by Italians (12%), Portuguese (5.4%), British (4.6%) and US-Americans (4.5%). 96% of the pilgrims started in Ferrol and only 2.2% in A Coruña. August is the most popular month for pilgrims to finish this camino.
