= Betanzos (comarca) =

- Comarca
- Flag Coat of arms
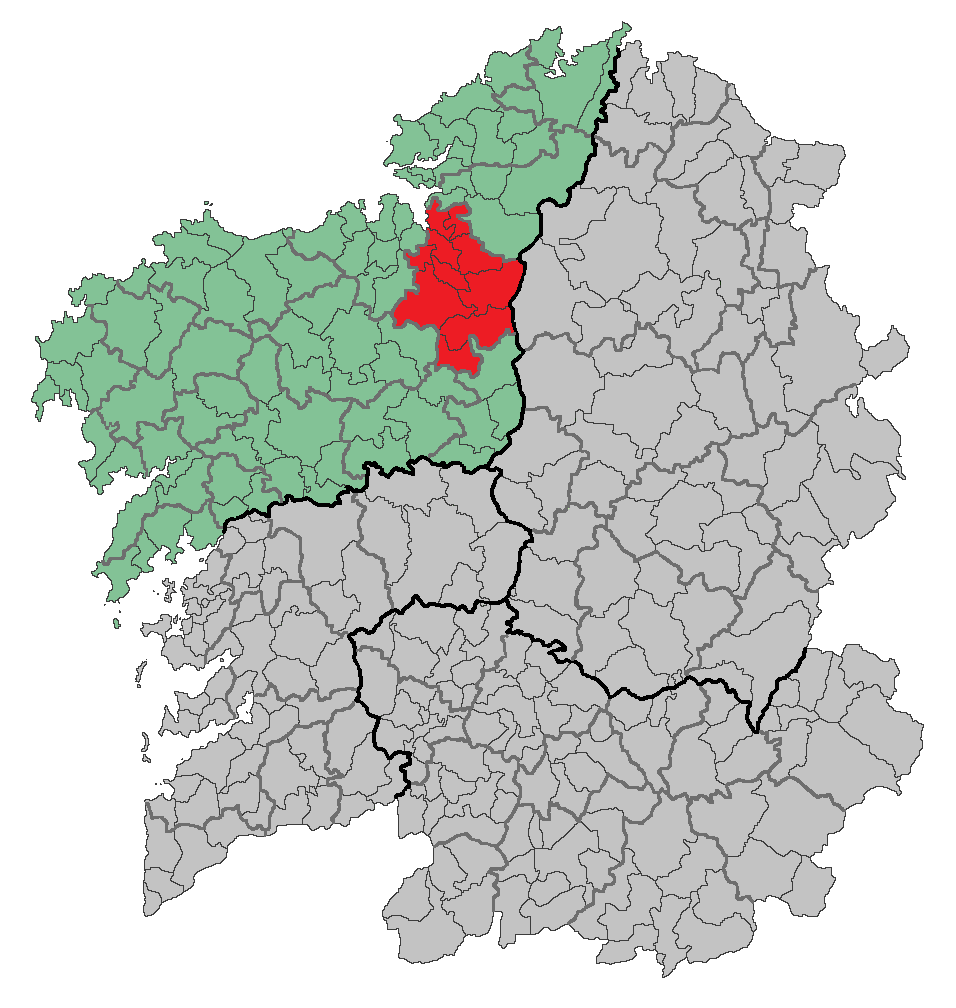
- Coordinates: 43°15′N 8°8′W
- Country: Spain
- Autonomous community: Galicia
- Province: A Coruña
- Capital: Betanzos
- Municipalities: List: Aranga, Betanzos, Coirós, Curtis, Irixoa, Miño, Oza-Cesuras, Paderne, Vilarmaior e Vilasantar

Area
  - Total: 669.3 km^{2} (258.4 sq mi)

Population (2019)
  - Total: 38,083
  - Density: 56.90/km^{2} (147.4/sq mi)
- Demonym: Mariñano (Mariñán)
- Time zone: UTC+1 (CET)
  - Summer (DST): UTC+2 (CEST)

Betanzos is a comarca in the Galician Province of A Coruña. The overall population of this local region is 38,083 (2019).

== Municipalities ==
There are ten municipalities in the comarca:

Aranga, Betanzos, Coirós, Curtis, Irixoa, Miño, Oza-Cesuras, Paderne, Vilarmaior and Vilasantar.
