= Cee, Spain =

Coordinates: 42°57′N 9°10′W

Concello de Cee
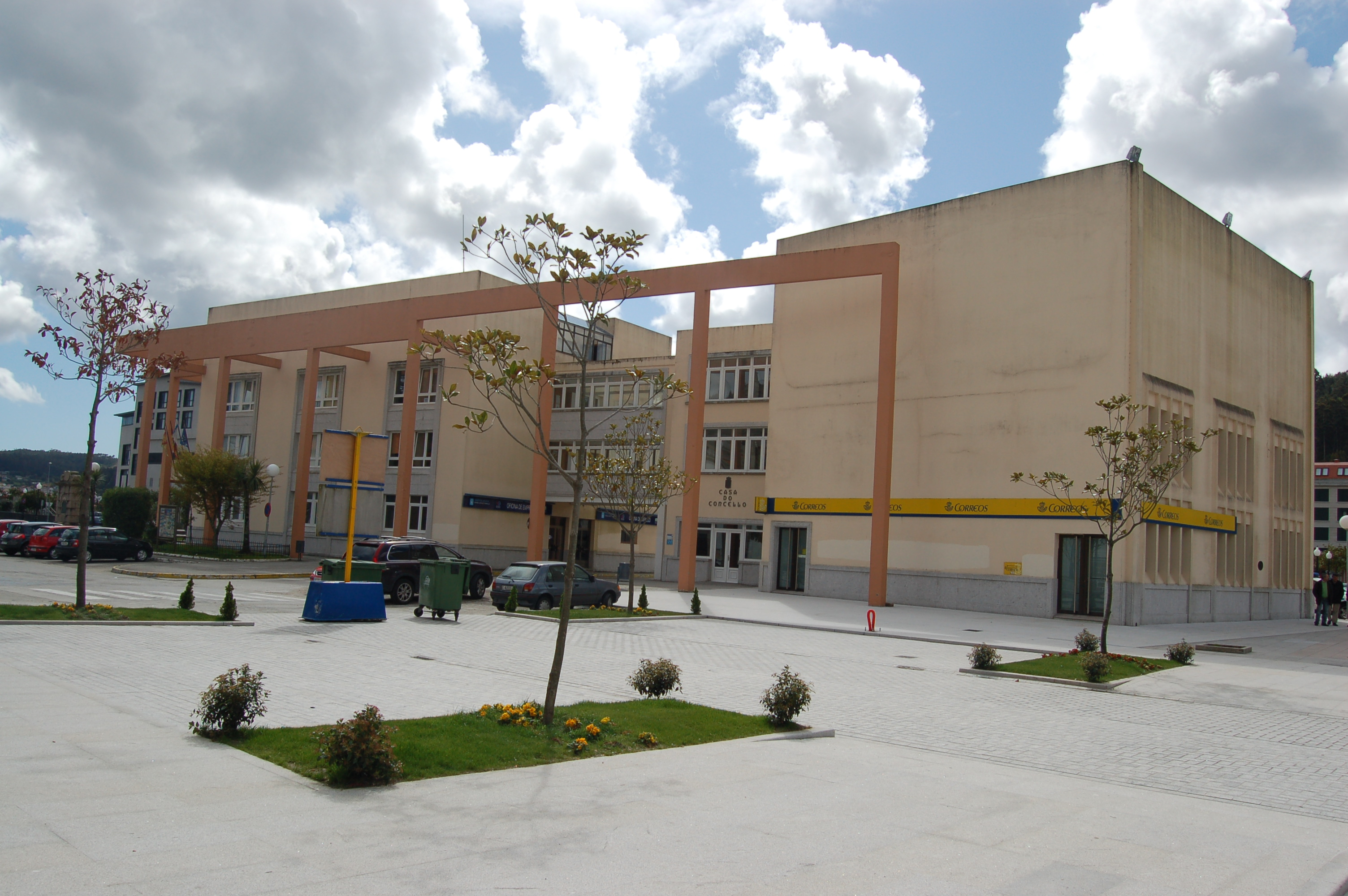

- Coat of arms
- Nickname: Cee
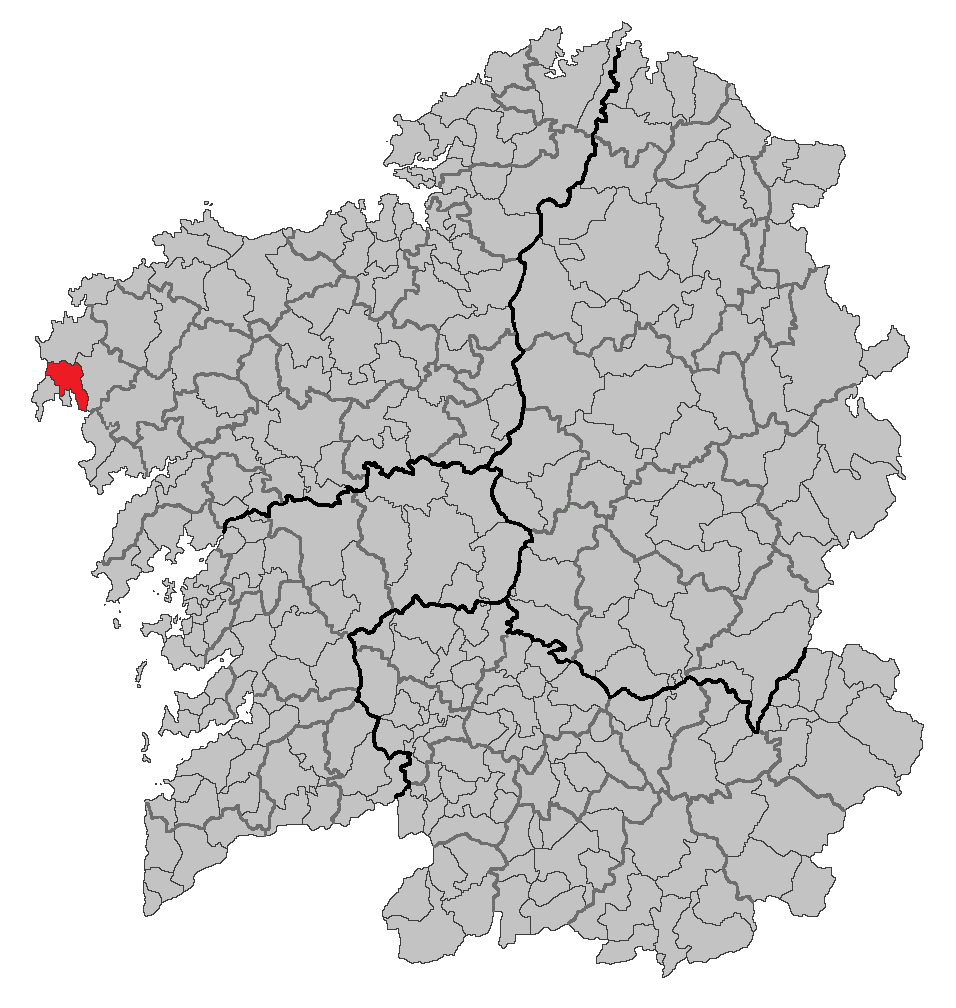
- Location of Cee within Galicia
- Parroquias: 6

Area
  - Total: 52.2 km^{2} (20.2 sq mi)

Population (2025-01-01)
  - Total: 7,731
  - Density: 148/km^{2} (384/sq mi)
- Time zone: UTC+1 (CET)
  - Summer (DST): UTC+2 (CEST)
- Website: http://www.concellocee.es/

Cee is a municipality of northwestern Spain in the province of A Coruña, in the autonomous community of Galicia. It has a population of 7,712 inhabitants (INE, 2010).

== Demography ==
From:INE Archiv

== Climate ==
The climate of Cee is warm in the spring and hot in the summer months of July and August, typical of the northwest coast of Galicia.

== See also ==
List of municipalities in A Coruña
