= Santiso =

Coordinates: 42°51′00″N 8°03′00″W

Concello de Santiso
- municipality
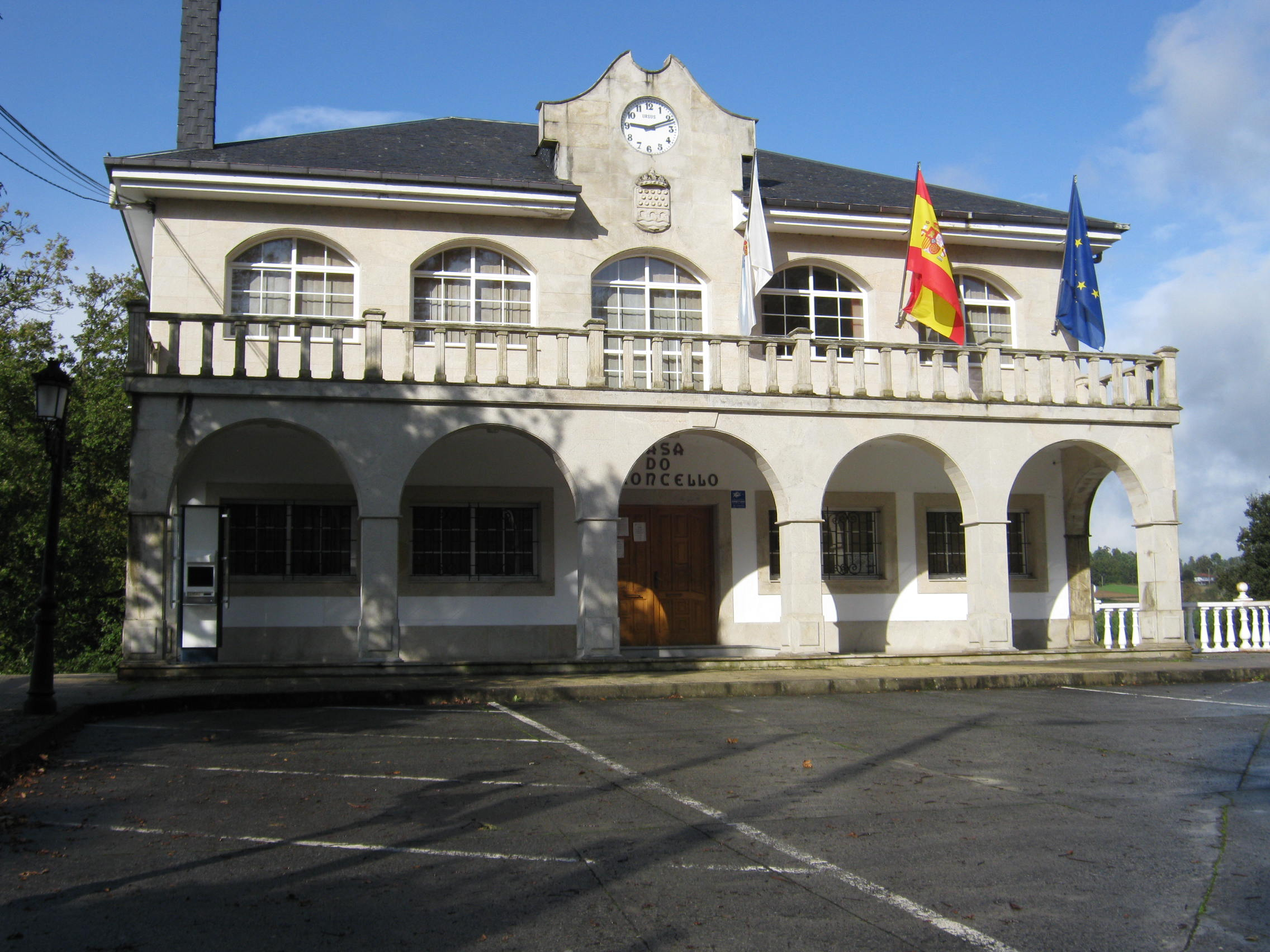

- Coat of arms
- Nickname: Santiso
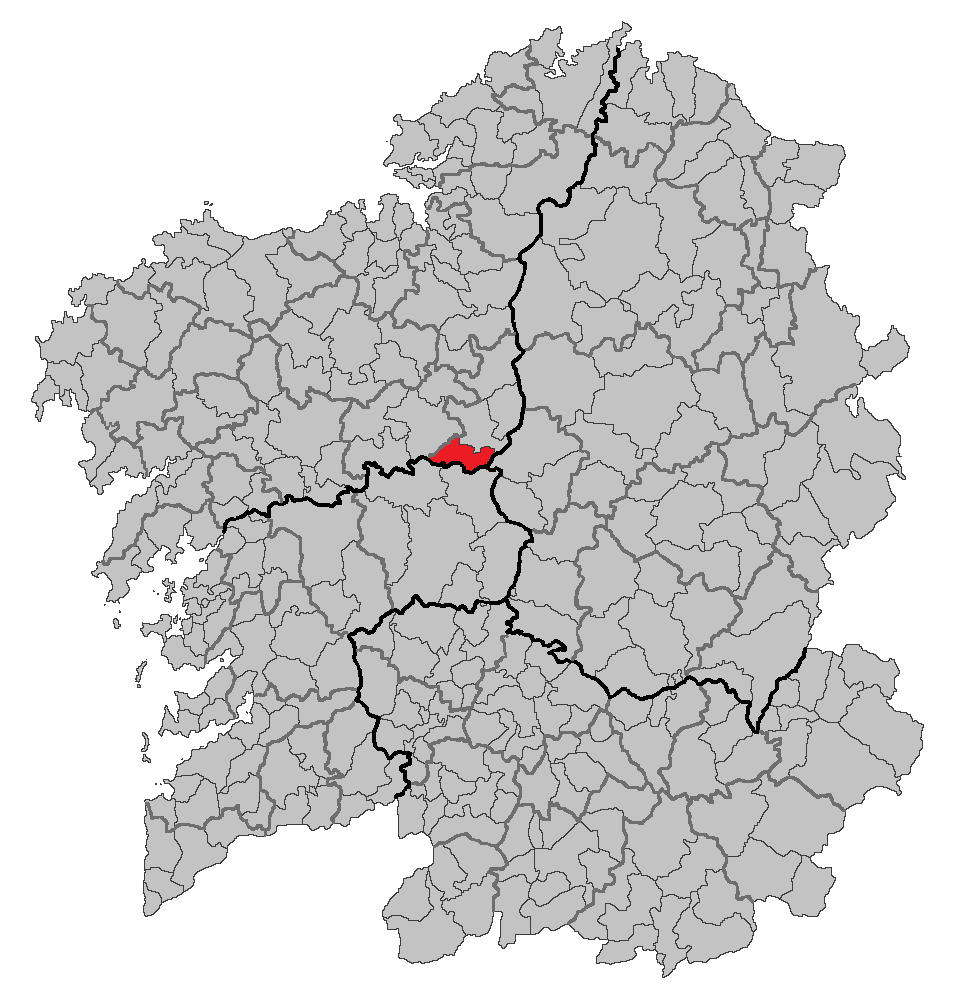
- Location of Santiso within Galicia

Area
  - Total: 67.45 km^{2} (26.04 sq mi)

Population (2025-01-01)
  - Total: 1,430
  - Density: 21.2/km^{2} (54.9/sq mi)
- Time zone: UTC+1 (CET)
  - Summer (DST): UTC+2 (CEST)

Santiso is a municipality of northwestern Spain in the province of A Coruña, in the autonomous community of Galicia. It is situated in the southeast of the province.

== See also ==
List of municipalities in A Coruña
