= Dodro =

Concello de Dodro
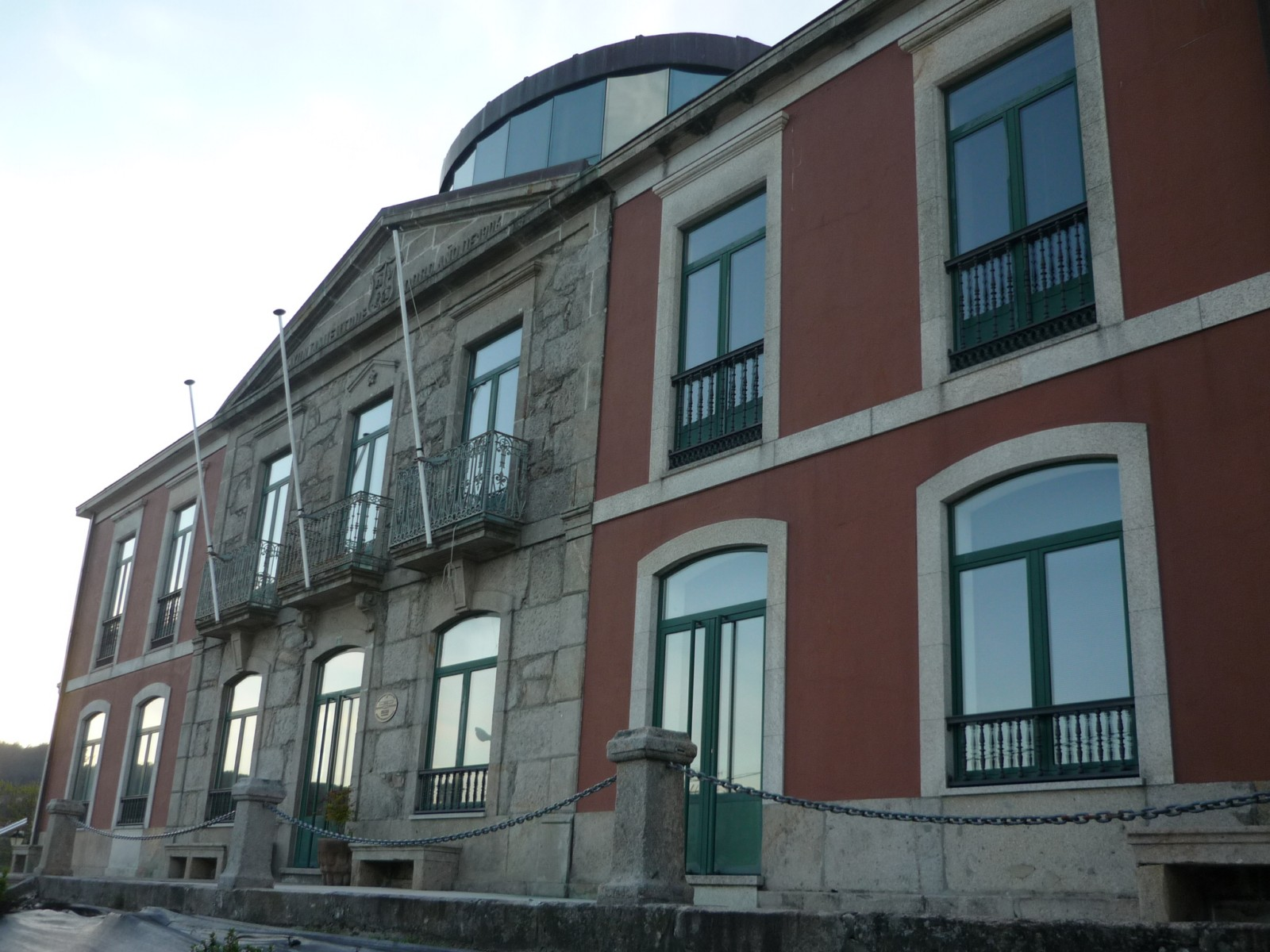

- Coat of arms
- Nickname: Dodro
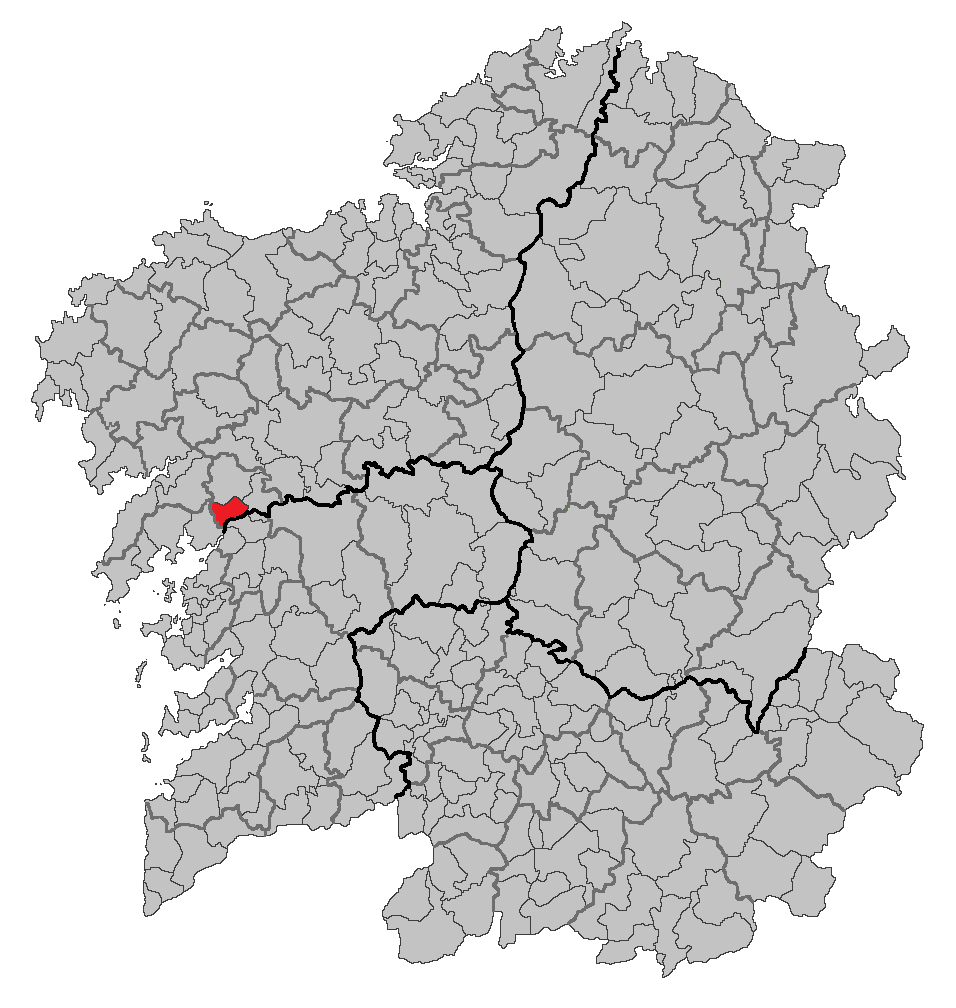
- Location of Dodro within Galicia
- Coordinates: 42°43′3″N 8°42′53″W
- Country: Spain
- Province: A Coruna

Area
  - Total: 36.5 km^{2} (14.1 sq mi)

Population (2025-01-01)
  - Total: 2,589
  - Density: 70.9/km^{2} (184/sq mi)
- Time zone: UTC+1 (CET)
  - Summer (DST): UTC+2 (CEST)
- Website: http://www.dodro.gal/

Dodro is a municipality of northwestern Spain in the province of A Coruña, in the autonomous community of Galicia. It is located along with lower reaches and at the mouth of the Ulla river, which is a continuation of the Ría de Arosa.

== See also ==
List of municipalities in A Coruña
