= Neda, Galicia =

Neda
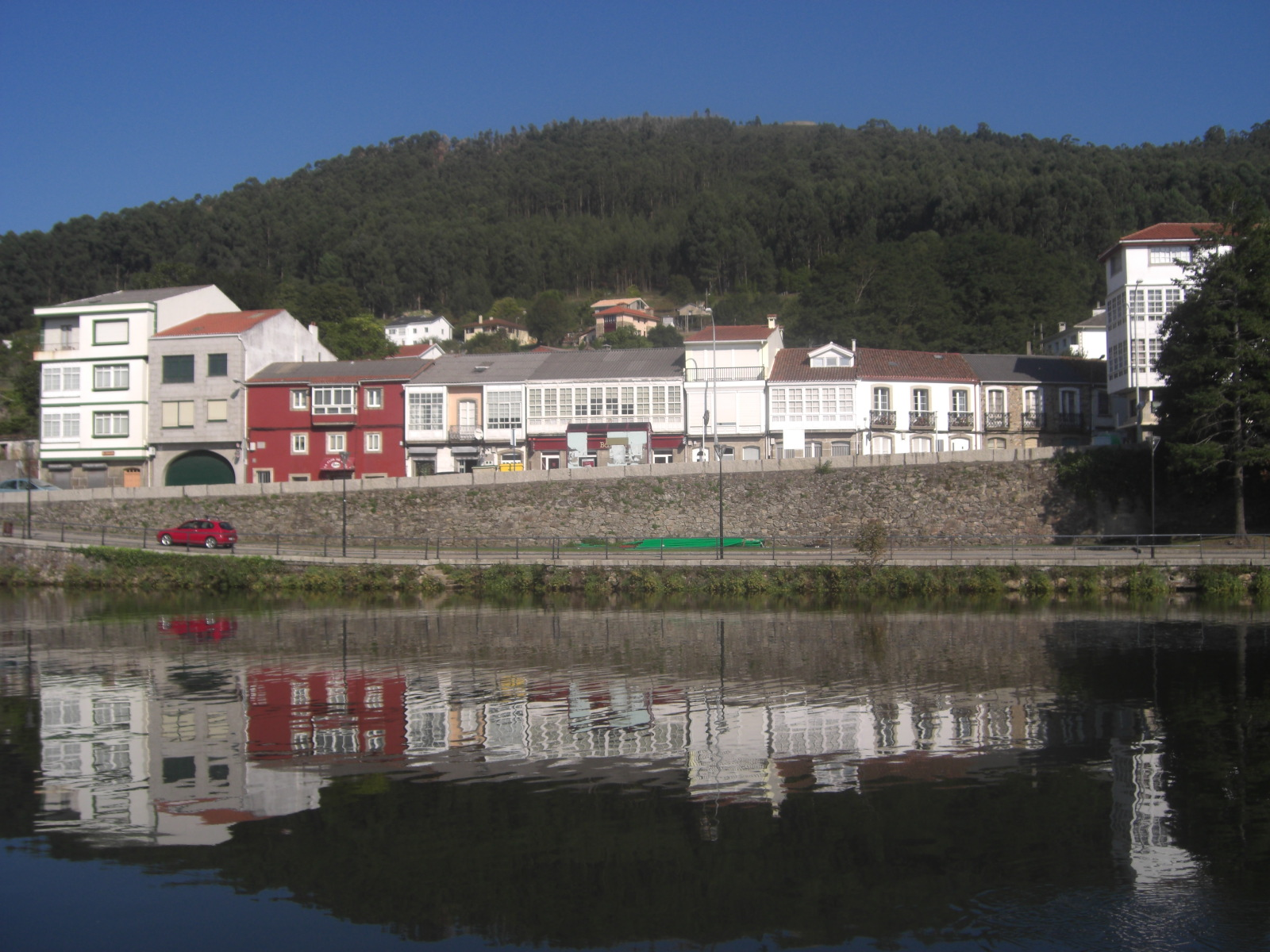

- Coat of arms

- Location in Spain
- Coordinates: 43°30′N 8°7′W
- Country: Spain
- Autonomous community: Galicia
- Province: A Coruña
- Comarca: Ferrol

Government
  - Mayor: Ángel Alvariño Saavedra

Area
  - Total: 23.89 km^{2} (9.22 sq mi)

Population (2025-01-01)
  - Total: 4,925
  - Density: 206.2/km^{2} (533.9/sq mi)
- Time zone: UTC+1 (CET)
  - Summer (DST): UTC+2 (CEST)
- Website: Official website

Neda is a municipality in province of A Coruña in the autonomous community of Galicia in northwestern Spain.

The town is on the English Way path of the Camino de Santiago. It is said that the father of George A. Romero was born here.

== Parishes ==
The municipality is home to four parishes:

- San Pedro de Anca
- San Nicolás de Neda
- Santa María de Neda
- Santo André de Viladonelle

== Economy ==
Neda is a predominantly rural borough, though important industries like shipyards, foundries, and workshops are to be found in nearby Ferrol. Farming, agriculture and services, together with bread making, are the main local industries.

== See also ==
List of municipalities in A Coruña
