= Cerdido =

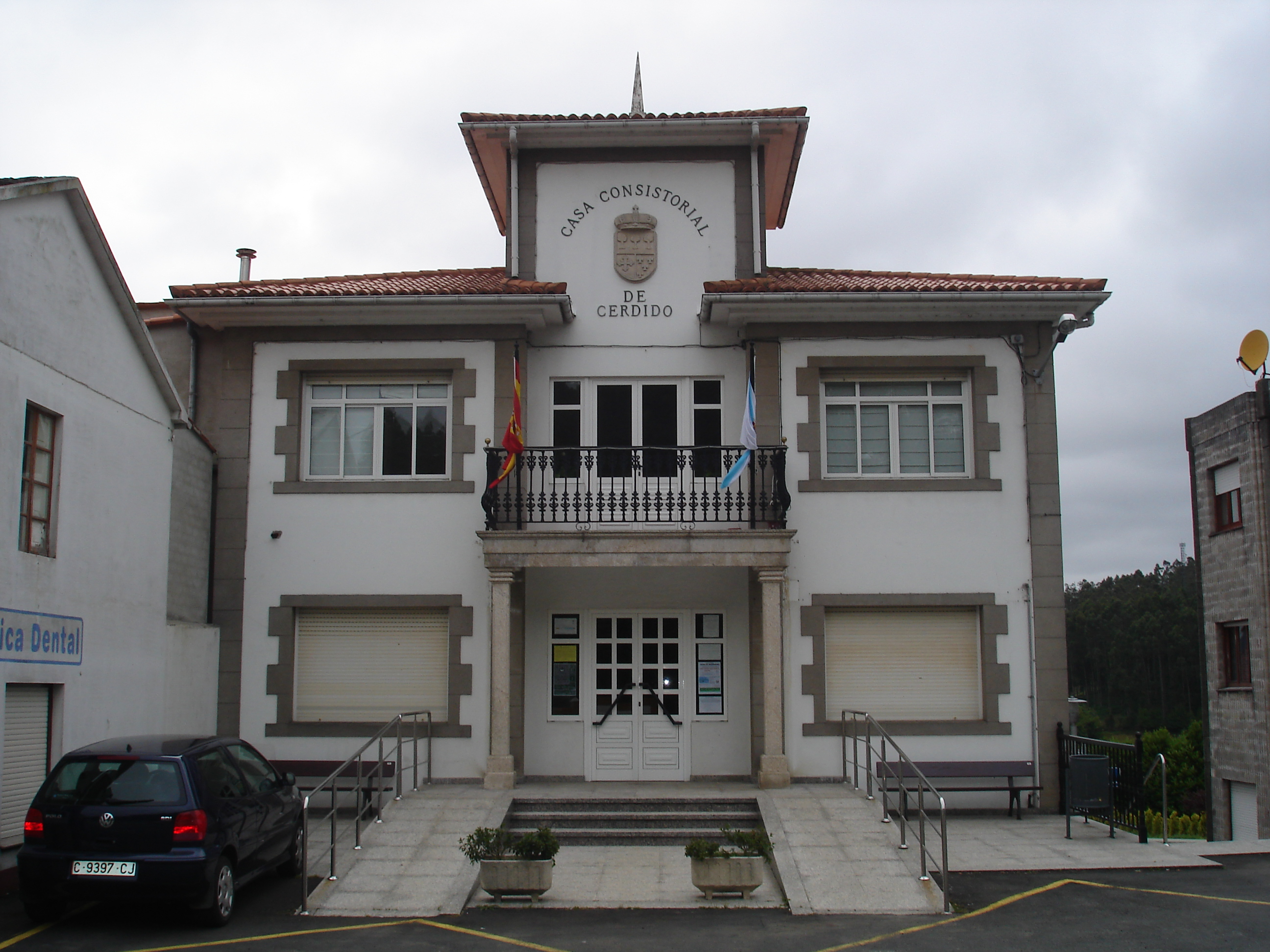

- Coat of arms

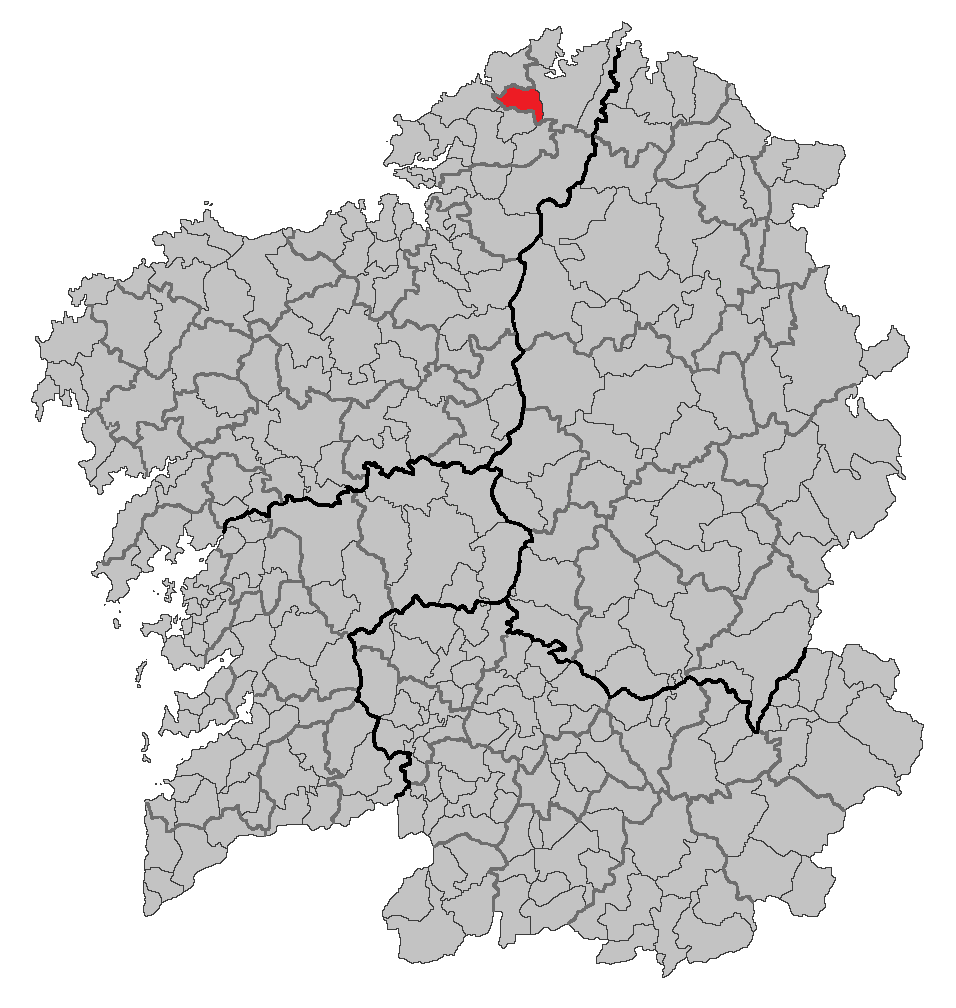
- Location of Cerdido within Galicia
- Parroquias: A Barqueira, Cerdido & Os Casás

Area
  - Total: 53 km^{2} (20 sq mi)

Population (2025-01-01)
  - Total: 1,006
  - Density: 19/km^{2} (49/sq mi)
- Website: http://www.cerdido.org

43°37′26.87″N 7°59′42.69″W

Cerdido is a municipality in the province of A Coruña, in the autonomous community of Galicia, Spain. It belongs to the comarca of Ortegal.

== Industry ==
Farming and timber production, together with services, are the main economic activities. Wind-mill parks are common in Ferrolterra, particularly in the boroughs of Carino, Cedeira and A Capelada.

== Climate ==
Due to its geographical proximity to the Atlantic Ocean, Cerdido does not have extreme oscillation in its weather conditions in winter or in summer. The weather is mild year-round, unlike the weather in other parts of the Iberian Peninsula. Like the rest of Galicia, it is rainy and beautifully green, and unlike other parts of Ferrolterra, in winter time snow can be found in most parts of the borough.

== See also ==
List of municipalities in A Coruña
