= Coirós =

Concello de Coirós
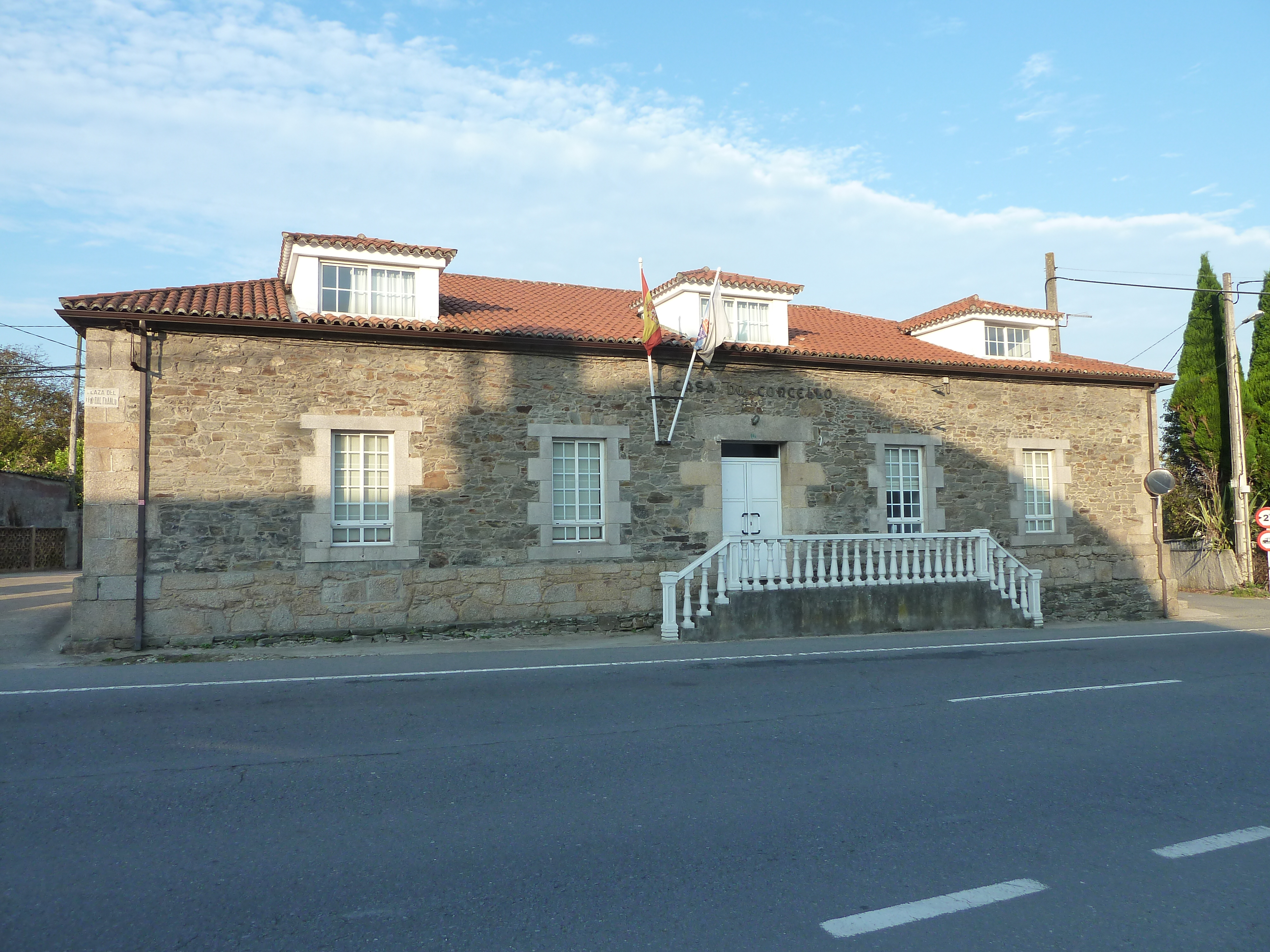

- Coat of arms
- Nickname: Coirós
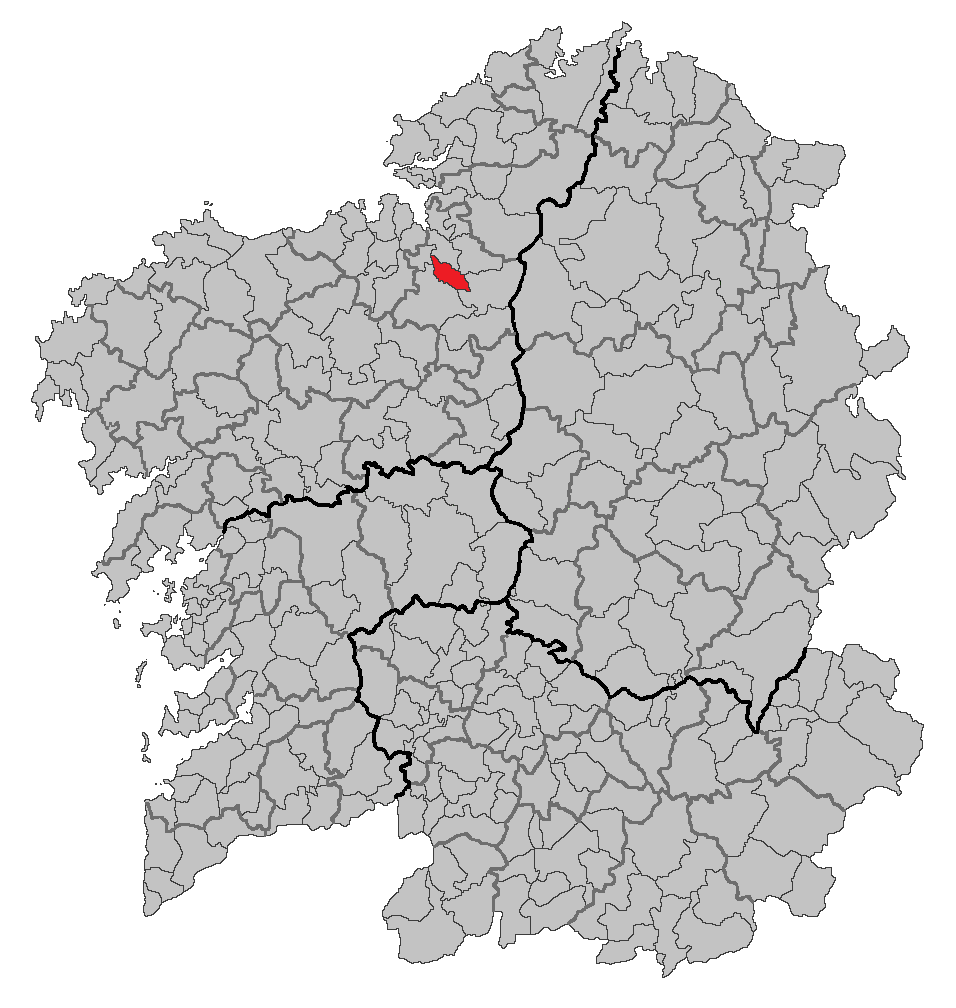
- Location of Coirós within Galicia

- Location within Spain. Concello de Coirós (Galicia)
- Coordinates: 43°15′N 8°10′W
- Country: Spain
- Autonomous Community: Galicia
- Province: A Coruña
- Comarca: Betanzos

Government
  - Alcalde (Mayor): Francisco Quintela Requeijo (People's Party)

Area
  - Total: 33.60 km^{2} (12.97 sq mi)

Population (2024)
  - Total: 1,923
  - Density: 57.23/km^{2} (148.2/sq mi)
- Time zone: UTC+1 (CET)
  - Summer (DST): UTC+2 (CEST)
- Parroquias: Armea, Coirós, Colantres, Lesa, Santa María de Ois & Santiago de Ois
- Website: concellocoiros.com

Coirós (Galician pronunciation: [kojˈɾɔs]) is a municipality of northwestern Spain in the province of A Coruña, in the autonomous community of Galicia. It has a population of 1,923 inhabitants according to INE in 2024.

== Location ==
The lands of Coirós are found between the plateau of Lugo and Las Marinas of A Coruña.

== See also ==
List of municipalities in A Coruña
