= Bergondo =

Municipality in A Coruña, Spain

Coordinates: 43°19′N 8°14′W

Concello de Bergondo
- municipality
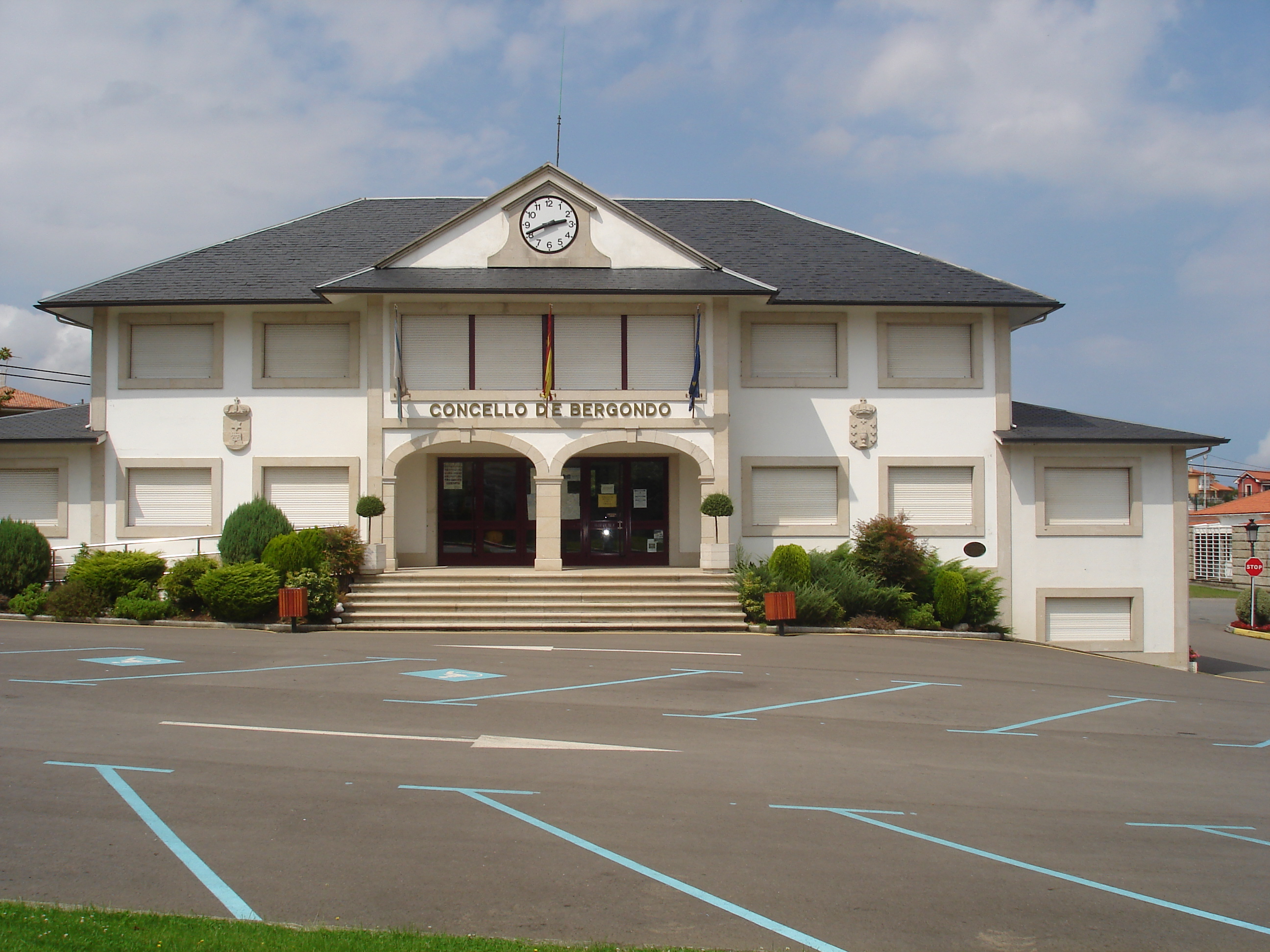

- Coat of arms

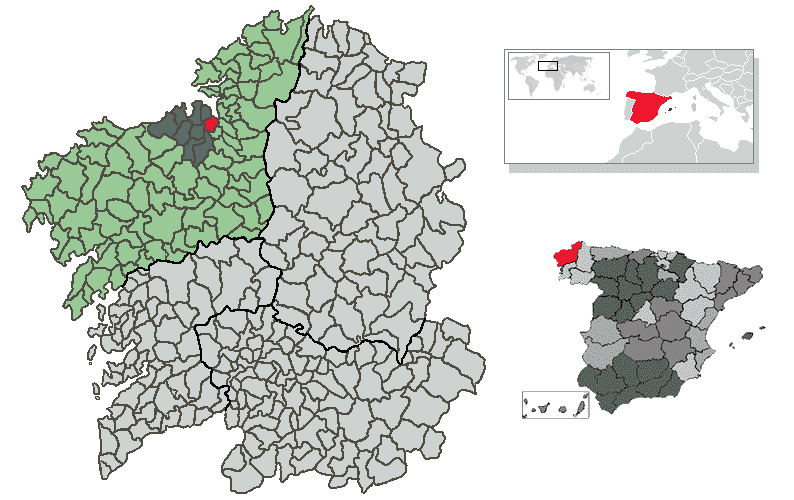
- Location of Bergondo within Galicia
- Country: Spain
- Autonomous community: Galicia
- Province: A Coruña

Area
  - Total: 32.85 km^{2} (12.68 sq mi)

Population (2025-01-01)
  - Total: 7,135
  - Density: 217.2/km^{2} (562.5/sq mi)
- Time zone: UTC+1 (CET)
  - Summer (DST): UTC+2 (CEST)
- Website: Concello de Bergondo

Bergondo is a municipality in province of A Coruña, in the autonomous community of Galicia in northwestern Spain. It has an area of 32.85 km^{2}, a population of 6,986 (2024 estimate), and a population density of 212.7 people/km^{2}.

== Demographics ==
Population change of the municipality from 1991 to 2004
2004	2001	1996	1991
6413	6223	5732	5392

== See also ==
- List of municipalities in A Coruña
