= Betanzos =

Municipality in Galicia, Spain

- Municipality
- Coat of arms

- Location in Spain Betanzos (Galicia) Betanzos (Spain)
- Coordinates: 43°16′45″N 8°12′38″W
- Country: Spain
- Autonomous community: Galicia
- Province: A Coruña
- Comarca: Betanzos
- Founded: 1219

Government
  - Alcalde: Ramón García (PSOE)

Area
  - Total: 24.19 km^{2} (9.34 sq mi)
- Elevation: 36 m (118 ft)

Population (2024)
  - Total: 13,261
  - Density: 548.2/km^{2} (1,420/sq mi)
- Demonym(s): Brigantino, na Betanceiro, ra; garelo/a
- Time zone: UTC+1 (CET)
  - Summer (DST): UTC+2 (CEST)
- Postal code: 15300
- Official language(s): Galician; Spanish
- Website: Official website

Betanzos (Galician pronunciation: [beˈtanθʊs]) is a municipality in the autonomous community of Galicia in northwestern Spain in the province of A Coruña. It belongs to the comarca of Betanzos. In Roman times Betanzos was called Flauvium Brigantium or Brigantium, this claim is disputed by the neighboring town of A Coruña along with many historians. During the Medieval period the settlement was known as Carunio.

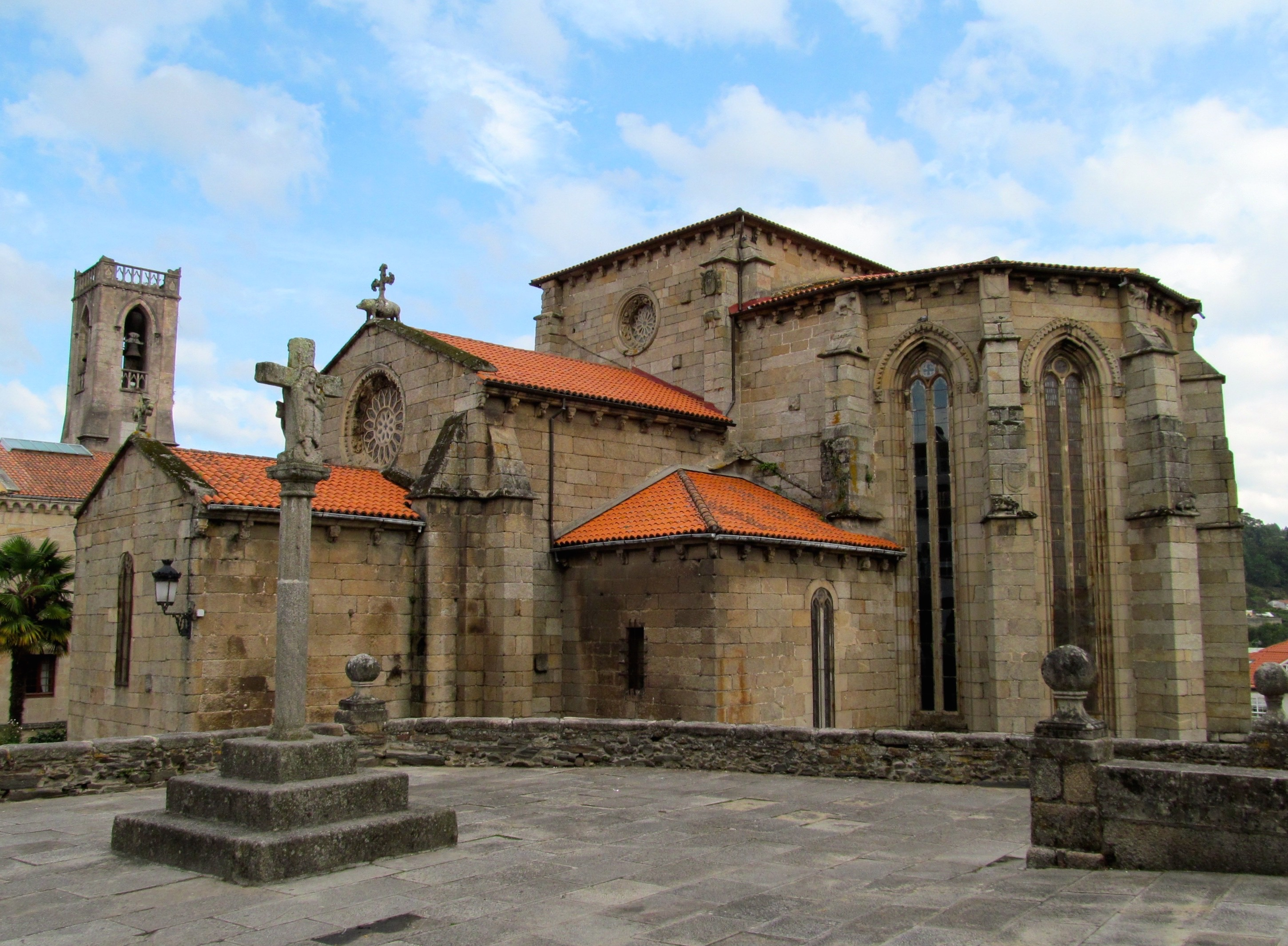
Igrexa de San Francisco (St Francis Church)

The town is located in a fertile valley close to the Atlantic Ocean, and it has one of the best preserved old quarters in Galicia. Noteworthy is the Igrexa de San Francisco (St Francis Church), erected in 1387 by order of count Fernán Pérez de Andrade, whose tomb, decorated with hunting scenes, is inside of the church. The Igrexa de Santiago (St James Church), built in the 15th century by the guild of tailors, has a main portal decorated with a horseback statue of Saint James. The town is on the English Way path of the Camino de Santiago.

Other sights in the town are several town palaces, a 16th-century clock tower, and the town walls, which preserve three of their original four gates.

There are two celebrations in Betanzos in August each year. At the festival of San Roque, a very large paper balloon is launched. Later in August, decorated boats sail along the Mandeo river to the nearby Os Caneiros.

== Etymology ==
Carunio is the most acceptable origin of the town today's name, a pathway which perhaps suffered a sudden overturn. Pointing out Calunio as it most probable rule name, popularly vocalized changing the L by the R, a similar pathway along with Corunna.

Calunio as a toponym fits well as an evolution of "calunia" the place where calumny somehow was associated to, for example a few fishermen depicting their fishery within some augmentation. When the hamlet step up to the village status claims for a more feasible official name would stand aiming its elevation purposes . Betar which means to match the colors, for example when making fashionable cloths, used figuratively as to say well or agree, was the antonym picked down to replace the previous form of nominate the place. Within the betar family of words, betanços would apply better for the double function of invert the context (without distort the action of have been saying something in it superlative acception) and to be suitable as a toponym where Betanzos is its latest form.

== Demographics ==
From: INE Atchiv - Grafic for Wikipedia

== See also ==
- List of municipalities in A Coruña
