= Vilarmaior =

Vilarmaior Villarmayor
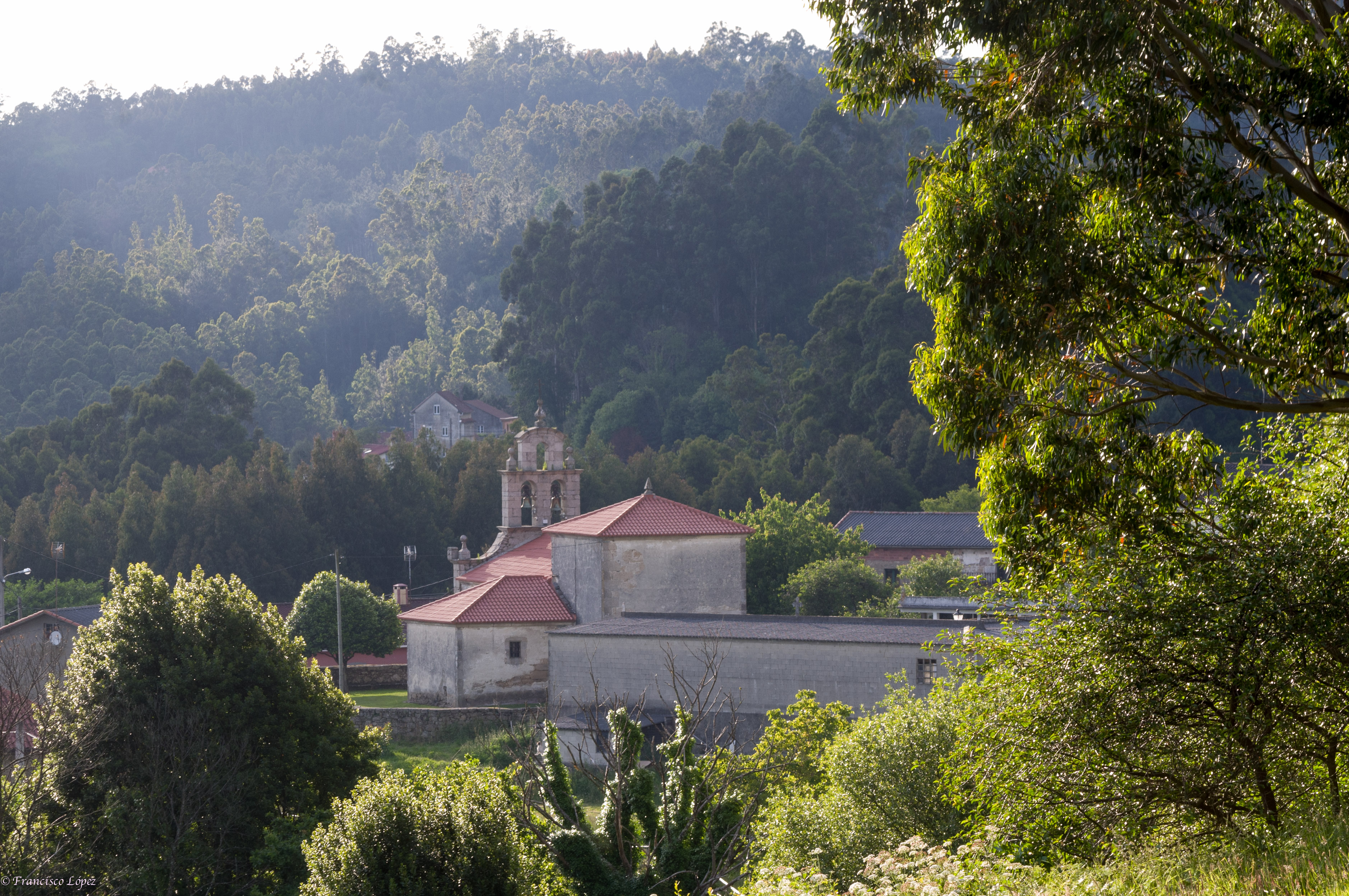

- Flag Coat of arms

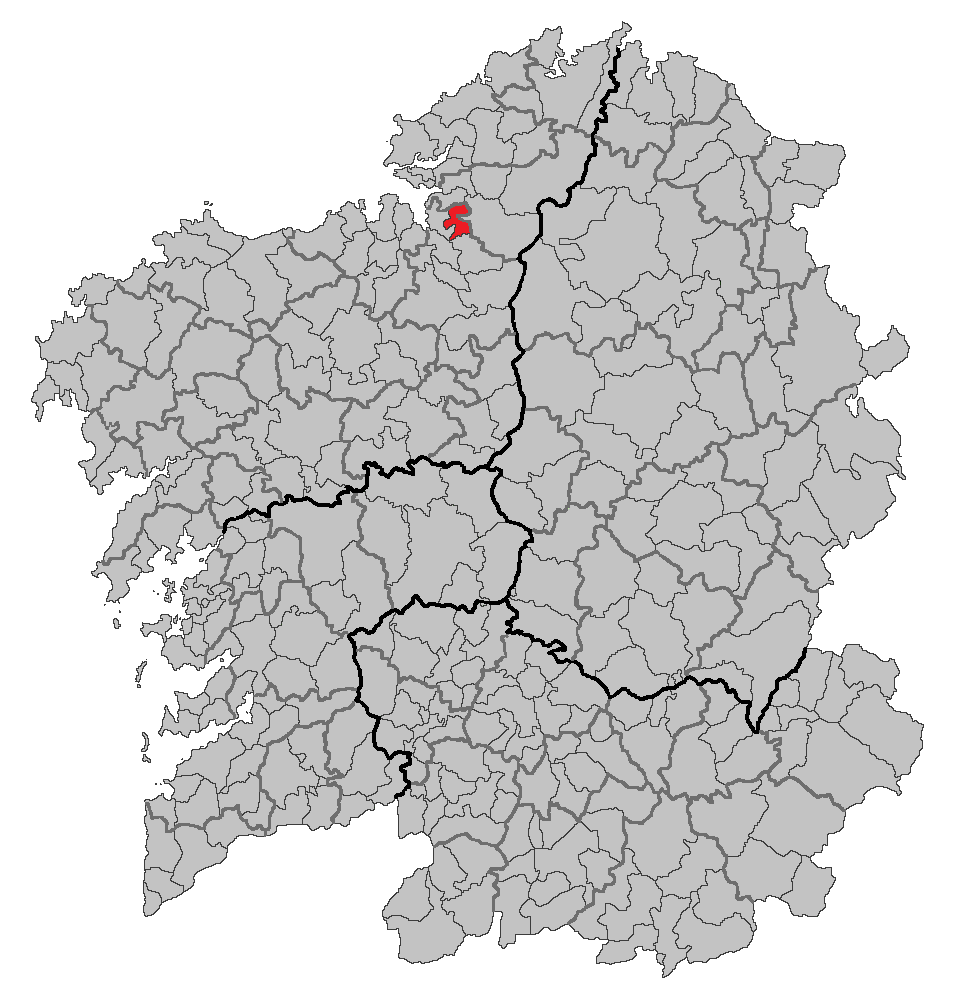
- Location of the municipal area in Galicia.

- Location in Spain
- Coordinates: 43°20′26″N 8°9′20″W
- Country: Spain
- Autonomous community: Galicia
- Province: A Coruña
- Comarca: Betanzos

Government
  - Mayor: Carlos Vázquez Quintián

Area
  - Total: 30.35 km^{2} (11.72 sq mi)

Population (2025-01-01)
  - Total: 1,242
  - Density: 40.92/km^{2} (106.0/sq mi)
- Time zone: UTC+1 (CET)
  - Summer (DST): UTC+2 (CEST)
- Website: Official website

Vilarmaior (Galician pronunciation: [biˌlaɾmaˈjoɾ]) is a municipality in the province of A Coruña in the autonomous community of Galicia in northwestern Spain. It belongs to the comarca of Betanzos.

== Geography ==
It is a small municipality of 30.35 km^{2} located in the Mariñas Orientales region. Its climate can be classified as oceanic-humid, typical of the northern Galician coast, and its lithology is similar to the rest of Galicia, with schists, gneissic granites, and granulated granites of two mica types. The highest points are found in the eastern part of the municipality: O Catasol at 440 m and O Seixo Grande at 375 m.

== History ==
=== Contemporary History ===
The Municipality of Pontedeume integrated the territory of the "extinct" Vilarmaior in 1868 and from 1877 to 1890, and then separated it when creating Vilarmaior.

== See also ==
- List of municipalities in A Coruña
