= Oza Cesuras =

Coordinates: 43°10′N 8°12′W

Concello de Oza Cesuras
- municipality
- Flag

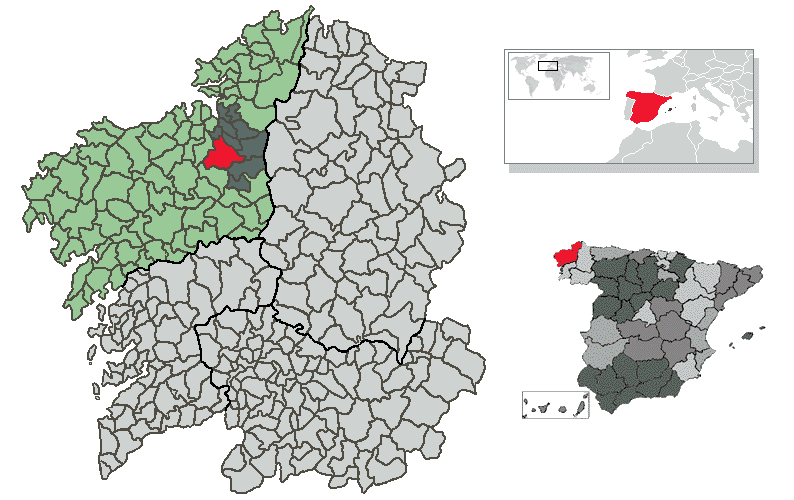
- Situation of Oza Cesuras within Galicia
- Country: Spain
- Autonomous Community: Galicia
- Province: A Coruña
- Comarca: Betanzos
- Parroquias: List: Bandoxa; Cis; Cuíña; Mondoi; Oza; Parada; Porzomillos; Reboredo; A Regueira; Rodeiro; Salto; Vivente

Area
  - Total: 151.8 km^{2} (58.6 sq mi)

Population (2025-01-01)
  - Total: 5,159
- Time zone: UTC+1 (CET)
  - Summer (DST): UTC+2 (CET)

Oza Cesuras is a municipality of northwestern Spain in the province of A Coruña, in the autonomous community of Galicia. It is located in the comarca of Betanzos. It arose from the merger on 6 June 2013 of Cesuras and Oza dos Ríos municipalities.

== See also ==
List of municipalities in A Coruña
