= Irixoa =

Coordinates: 43°17′05″N 8°03′28″W

Concello de Irixoa
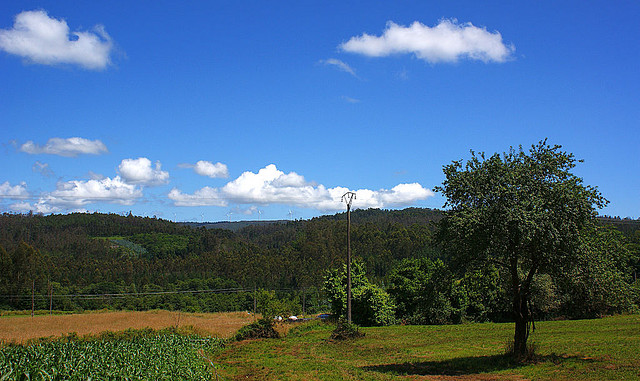

- Coat of arms
- Nickname: Irixoa
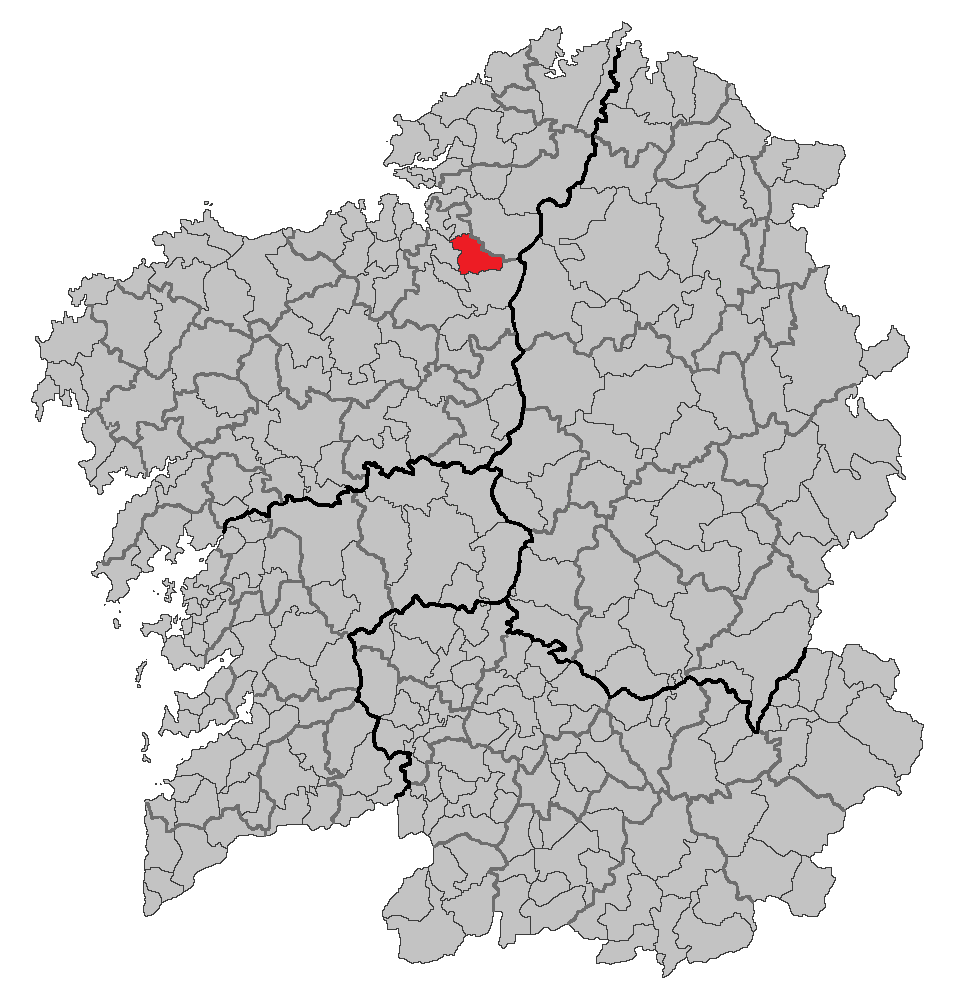
- Location of Irixoa within Galicia

Area
  - Total: 68.52 km^{2} (26.46 sq mi)

Population (2025-01-01)
  - Total: 1,343
  - Density: 19.60/km^{2} (50.76/sq mi)
- Time zone: UTC+1 (CET)
  - Summer (DST): UTC+2 (CEST)

Irixoa (Galician pronunciation: [iɾiˈʃɔɐ]) is a municipality of northwestern Spain in the province of A Coruña, in the autonomous community of Galicia. It belongs to the comarca of Betanzos. Irixoa has a population of 1,502 inhabitants (INE, 2008).

== See also ==
List of municipalities in A Coruña
