= Paderne, A Coruña =

Paderne
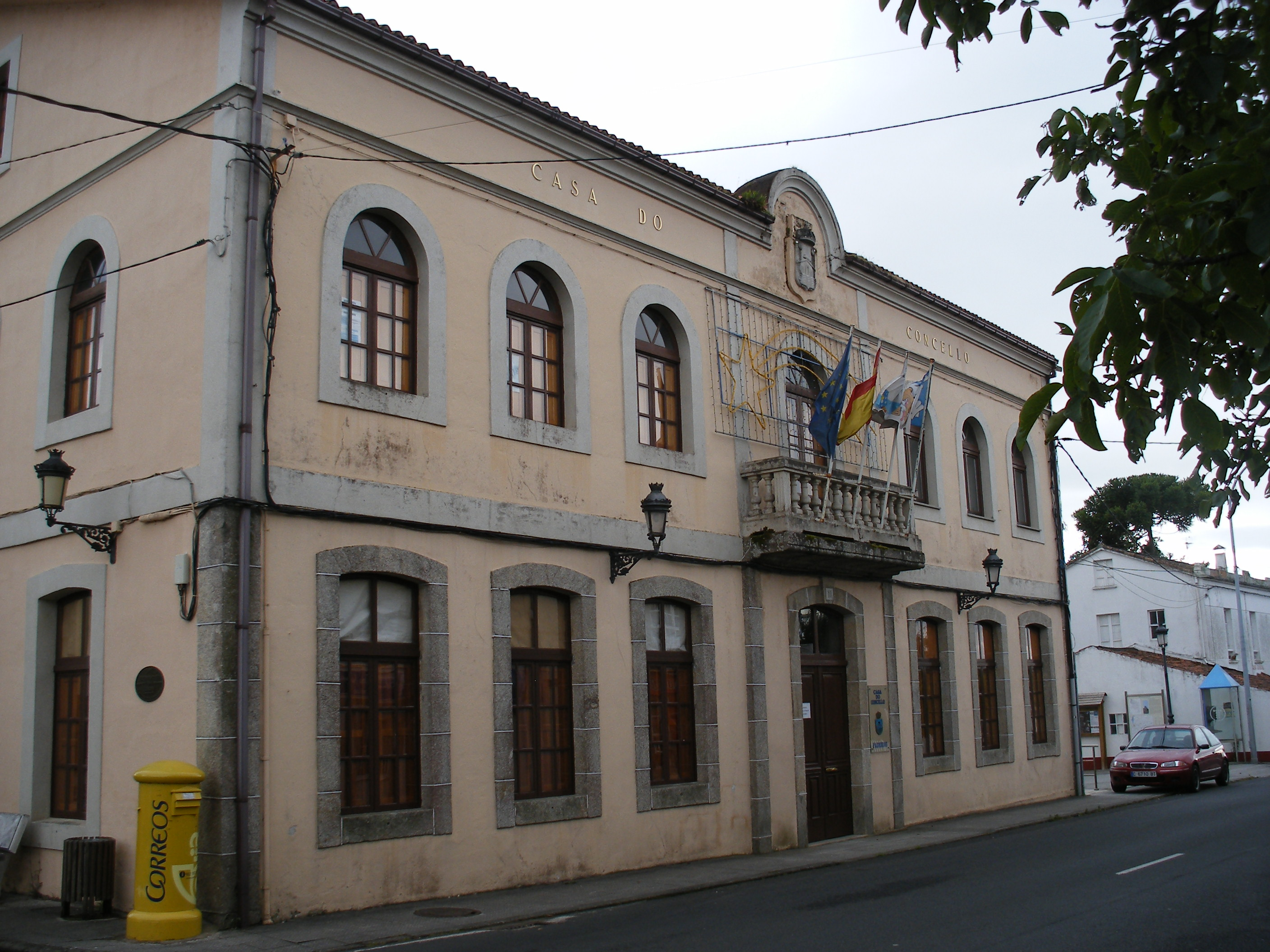

- Flag Coat of arms

- Location in Spain.
- Coordinates: 43°17′00″N 8°10′28″W
- Country: Spain
- A. community: Galicia
- Province: A Coruña
- Comarca: Betanzos
- Municipality: Paderne

Government
  - Mayor: César Longo Queijo (PSOE)

Area
  - Total: 38.3 km^{2} (14.8 sq mi)

Population (2025-01-01)
  - Total: 2,450
  - Density: 64.0/km^{2} (166/sq mi)
- Demonym: Pedernenses
- Website: Official website

Paderne is a municipality of northwestern Spain in the province of A Coruña, in the autonomous community of Galicia. It belongs to the comarca of Betanzos. It has a population of 2,735 (2006) and an area of 38.3 km^{2} (14.8 sq mi). It is 26 km from the provincial capital, A Coruña.

The town is on the English Way path of the Camino de Santiago.

== See also ==
List of municipalities in A Coruña
