= Province of A Coruña =

Province of Spain

Province of A Coruña Provincia da Coruña (Galician) Provincia de La Coruña (Spanish)
- Province
- Coat of arms

- Location of the Province of A Coruña in Spain
- Coordinates: 43.37135°N 8.396°W
- Country: Spain
- Autonomous community: Galicia
- Capital: A Coruña
- Municipalities: 93

Government
  - Body: Deputación da Coruña
  - President of the Deputación: Valentín González Formoso (PSdeG)

Area
  - Total: 7,953.90 km^{2} (3,071.02 sq mi)
  - Rank: 32nd in Spain

Population (2025)
  - Total: 1,135,623
  - Rank: 12th in Spain
  - Density: 142.776/km^{2} (369.787/sq mi)
- Demonyms: Coruñés (m); Coruñesa (f)
- Postal code: 15---
- ISO 3166 code: ES-C
- Parliament: 24 deputies (out of 75)
- Congress: 9 deputies (out of 350)
- Senate: 4 senators (out of 264)
- Website: www.dicoruna.es

The Province of A Coruña (Galician: provincia da Coruña [pɾoˈβinθjɐ ðɐ koˈɾuɲɐ]; Spanish: provincia de La Coruña [pɾoˈβinθja ðe la koˈɾuɲa]; historical English: Corunna) is the northwesternmost province of Spain, and one of the four provinces which constitute the autonomous community of Galicia. This province is surrounded by the Atlantic Ocean to the west and north, Pontevedra Province to the south and Lugo Province to the east.

It has a population of 1,135,623 in an area of 7,953.90 square kilometres (3,071.02 sq mi) across its 93 municipalities.

== History ==
The history of this province starts at the end of the Middle Ages during the reign of the Catholic Monarchs of Spain. During those years this province was far smaller than today. This is because in the 1833 territorial division of Spain the entire Province of Betanzos together with half of the Mondoñedo were amalgamated into one single province with its capital city in A Coruña. Since 1833, the province has always been the one with the largest population and largest coast. Until the second half of the 20th century, this province was both the religious and cultural centre of the entire region. The University of Santiago de Compostela was the only university in North-western Spain until the arrival of democracy after the death of General Francisco Franco.

== Municipalities ==
The province has 93 municipalities:

- A Baña
- A Capela
- A Coruña
- A Laracha
- A Pobra do Caramiñal
- Abegondo
- Ames
- Aranga
- Ares
- Arteixo
- Arzúa
- As Pontes de García Rodríguez
- As Somozas
- Bergondo
- Betanzos
- Boimorto
- Boiro
- Boqueixón
- Brión
- Cabana de Bergantiños
- Cabanas
- Camariñas
- Cambre
- Carballo
- Cariño
- Carnota
- Carral
- Cedeira
- Cee
- Cerceda
- Cerdido
- Oza-Cesuras
- Coirós
- Corcubión
- Coristanco
- Culleredo
- Curtis
- Dodro
- Dumbría
- Fene
- Ferrol
- Fisterra
- Frades
- Irixoa
- Laxe
- Lousame
- Malpica de Bergantiños
- Mañón
- Mazaricos
- Melide
- Mesía
- Miño
- Moeche
- Monfero
- Mugardos
- Muros
- Muxía
- Narón
- Neda
- Negreira
- Noia
- O Pino
- Oleiros
- Ordes
- Oroso
- Ortigueira
- Outes
- Paderne
- Padrón
- Ponteceso
- Pontedeume
- Porto do Son
- Rianxo
- Ribeira
- Rois
- Sada
- San Sadurniño
- Santa Comba
- Santiago de Compostela
- Santiso
- Sobrado
- Teo
- Toques
- Tordoia
- Touro
- Trazo
- Val do Dubra
- Valdoviño
- Vedra
- Vilarmaior
- Vilasantar
- Vimianzo
- Zas

== Demographics ==
Historical population
Year	Pop.	±%
1842	447,080	—
1857	551,989	+23.5%
1877	612,402	+10.9%
1887	635,327	+3.7%
1900	681,895	+7.3%
1910	726,697	+6.6%
1920	772,363	+6.3%
1930	835,906	+8.2%
1940	912,662	+9.2%
1950	971,641	+6.5%
1960	1,035,619	+6.6%
1970	1,030,745	−0.5%
1981	1,093,121	+6.1%
1991	1,096,966	+0.4%
2001	1,096,027	−0.1%
2011	1,141,286	+4.1%
2021	1,120,501	−1.8%
Source: INE

As of 2025, the population is 1,135,623, of which 48.0% are male, and 52.0% are female. Minors make up 13.7% of the population, and seniors make up 26.3%.

A Coruña Province Population c. 1787
District	population
City of A Coruña	13,575
City of Ferrol (Civilian Pop. Only)	24,993
Santiago de Compostela	15,584
Towns, villages and hamlets	c.229,123
All the Province (Total):	283,275
(Ferrol - Urban History, 2004)

A Coruña Province Population c. 1833
District	population
City of A Coruña	23,000
City of Ferrol (Civilian Pop. Only)	13,000
Santiago de Compostela	28,000
Towns, villages and hamlets	c.233,000
All the Province (Total):	c.297,000
(U. P. Gazetteer By Th.Baldwin, 1847)

=== Immigration ===
Foreign population by country of birth (2025)
Country	Population
Venezuela	26,301
Colombia	13,013
Cuba	9,008
Peru	8,818
Argentina	8,768
Brazil	8,472
Switzerland	7,738
Uruguay	5,183
Morocco	4,860
Dominican Republic	4,534
United Kingdom	4,351
Portugal	3,152
France	2,991
Senegal	2,709
Germany	2,553

As of 2025, immigrants make up 12.2% of the population. The 5 largest foreign countries of birth are Venezuela, Colombia, Cuba, Peru, and Argentina.

== Main sights ==
The cathedral of Santiago de Compostela is the destination of the Way of St. James, a major historical pilgrimage route since the Middle Ages which still gathers thousands of pilgrims each year from all over the world.

== Parks ==
- Atlantic Islands of Galicia National Park is the only national park in Galicia. It is shared between the provinces of A Coruña and Pontevedra.
- The "Fragas" of the River Eume Natural Park extends itself throughout the Eume and Ferrol regions of Ferrolterra.
- The Dunes of Corrubedo Natural Park (Parque Natural das Dunas de Corrubedo e lagoas de Carregal e Vixán) is a beach park at the very end of the Barbanza Peninsula.

== Transport ==
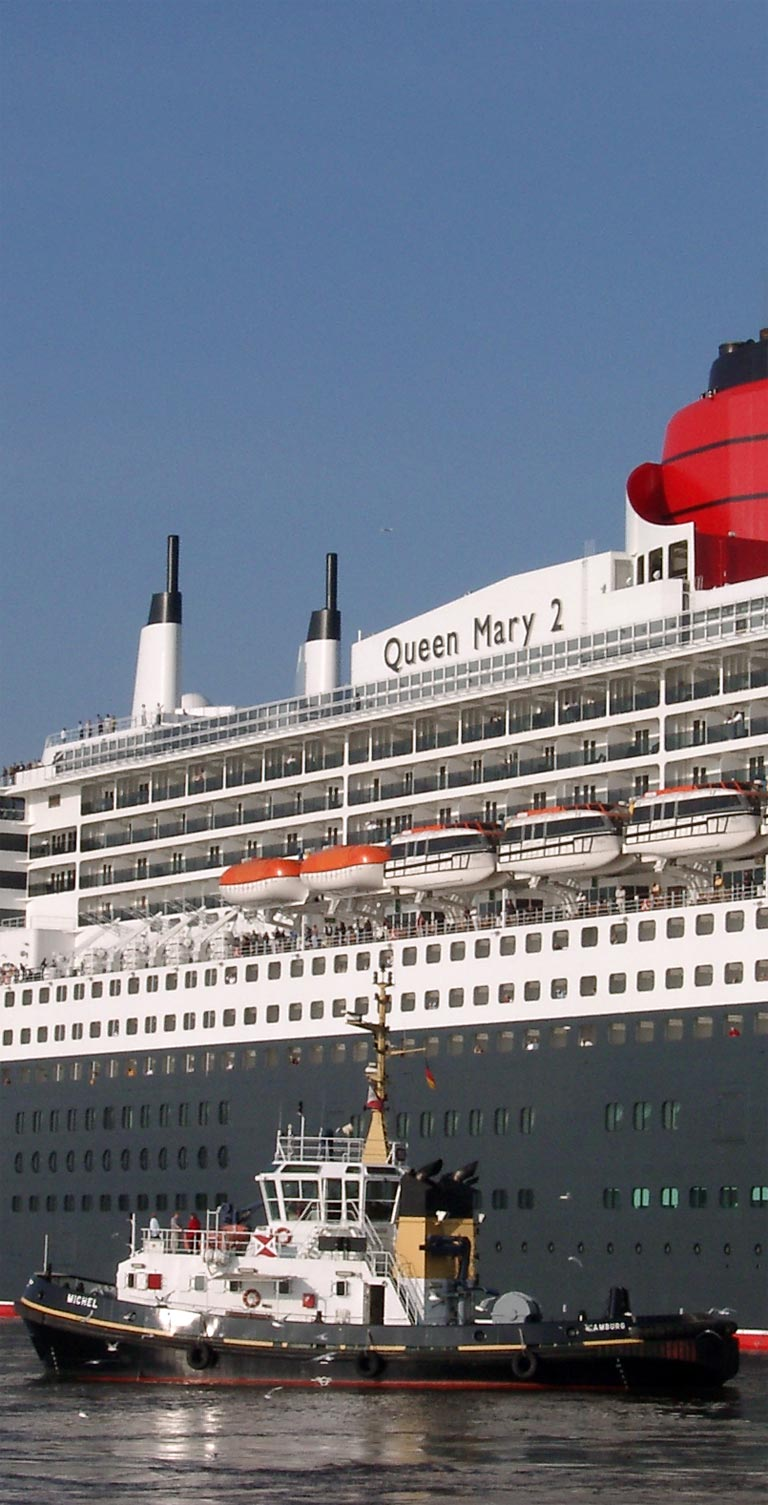
In recent years, Ferrol and A Coruña have become popular stops for transatlantic steamships en route to the Mediterranean.

=== Airports and airfields ===
- Aeroporto da Lavacolla in Santiago de Compostela
- Aeroporto de Alvedro in the City of A Coruña
- Heliporto da Graña in the Naval Base of A Graña (Ferrolterra)
- Heliporto de Narón in Naron (Ferrolterra)

=== Railway ===
- Spanish National Railway Network Linking every major city: Barqueiro, Ferrol, Betanzos, A Coruña and Santiago de Compostela.
- Spanish High Speed Railway Network (AVE) Linking most major cities of the province with Lisbon and Madrid is under construction.

== Economy ==
=== Ports ===
- A Coruña – Major Commercial Port – Rías Altas
- Malpica – Fishing Port – Costa da Morte
- Camariñas – Fishing Port – Costa da Morte
- Fisterra – Fishing Port – Costa da Morte
- Ferrol – Major Commercial Ports (also: Military) – Rias altas
- Cariño – Fishing Port – Rias altas
- Espasante – Fishing Port – Rias altas
- Cedeira – Fishing Port – Rias altas

== Sport ==
- Deportivo de La Coruña Spanish Primera Federación team from the City of A Coruña.
- Racing Ferrol Spanish Segunda División team from the City of Ferrol.
- SD Compostela Spanish Segunda Federación team from the City of Santiago de Compostela.
- Atlético Arteixo Spanish Tercera Federación team from the Municipality of Arteixo.
- Bergantiños FC Spanish Tercera Federación team from the Municipality of Carballo.
- SD Negreira Spanish Tercera Division team from the Municipality of Negreira.
- Autos Lobelle de Santiago FS Spanish División de Honor of Futsal team from the City of Santiago de Compostela.
