= Lérez =

River in Spain

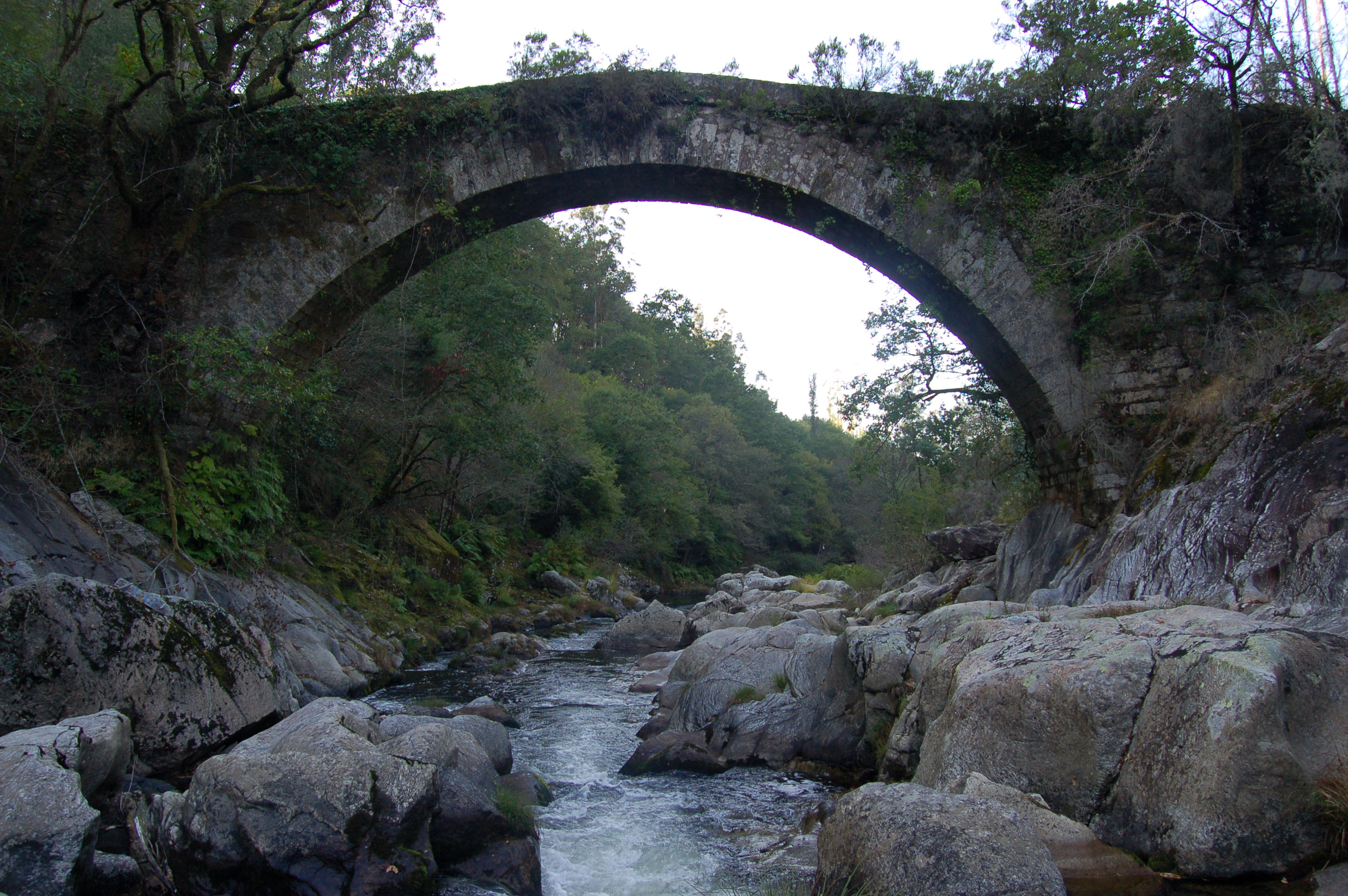
- The Lérez river at San Xurxo de Sacos, Cotobade.

Location
- Country: Spain
- Autonomous Community: Galicia
- City: Pontevedra

Physical characteristics
- Source: San Bieito
  - location: Forcarei, Pontevedra, Galicia, Spain
  - elevation: 900 m (3,000 ft)
- Mouth
  - location: Ria of Pontevedra, Spain
  - coordinates: 42.417727°N 8.673988°W
  - elevation: 0 m (0 ft)
- Length: 60 km (37 mi)

The Lérez is a river in South West Galicia, Spain. The river meets the Atlantic Ocean at Pontevedra, where it creates Pontevedra's ria. The sources of the 60-kilometre (37 mi) long stream are in Serra do Candán, in the mountain of San Bieito, in the parish of Aciveiro (Forcarei). The Lérez passes through the communities of Forcarei, Cerdedo, Campo Lameiro, Cotobade and, finally, Pontevedra.

Its main tributaries are the Salgueiro, Cabaleiros, Grande, O Castro, Quireza, Tenorio and Almofrei.

== See also ==
- List of rivers of Spain
- Rivers of Galicia
