= Carballeira de San Xusto =

Coordinates: 42°30′59″N 8°30′40″W

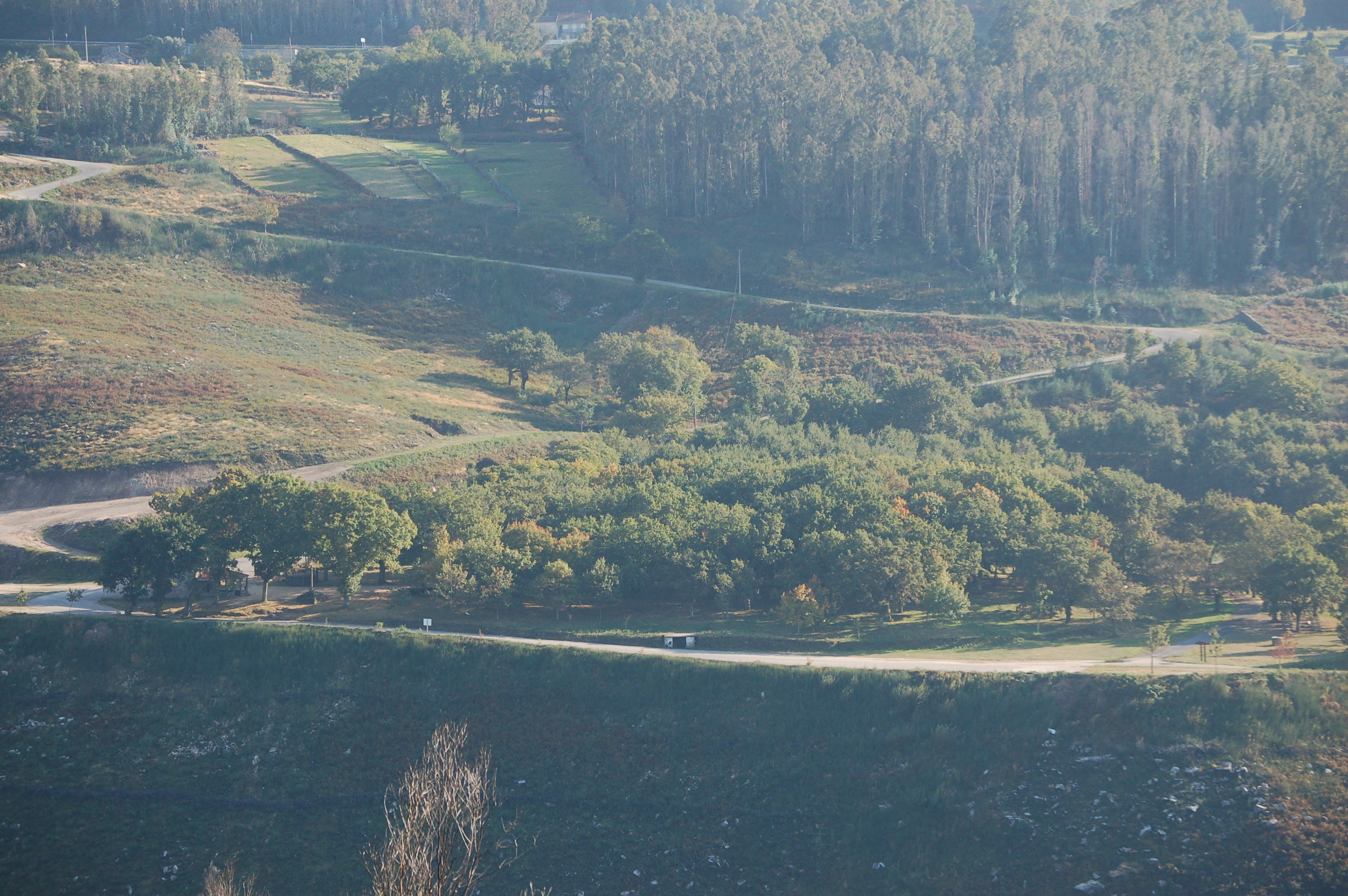
Carballeira de San Xusto.

The Carballeira de San Xusto is an oak forest located in the parish of San Xurxo de Sacos (Cerdedo-Cotobade), on a hill above the Lérez River, near the Ria de Pontevedra, in Galicia, Spain.

== Characteristics ==
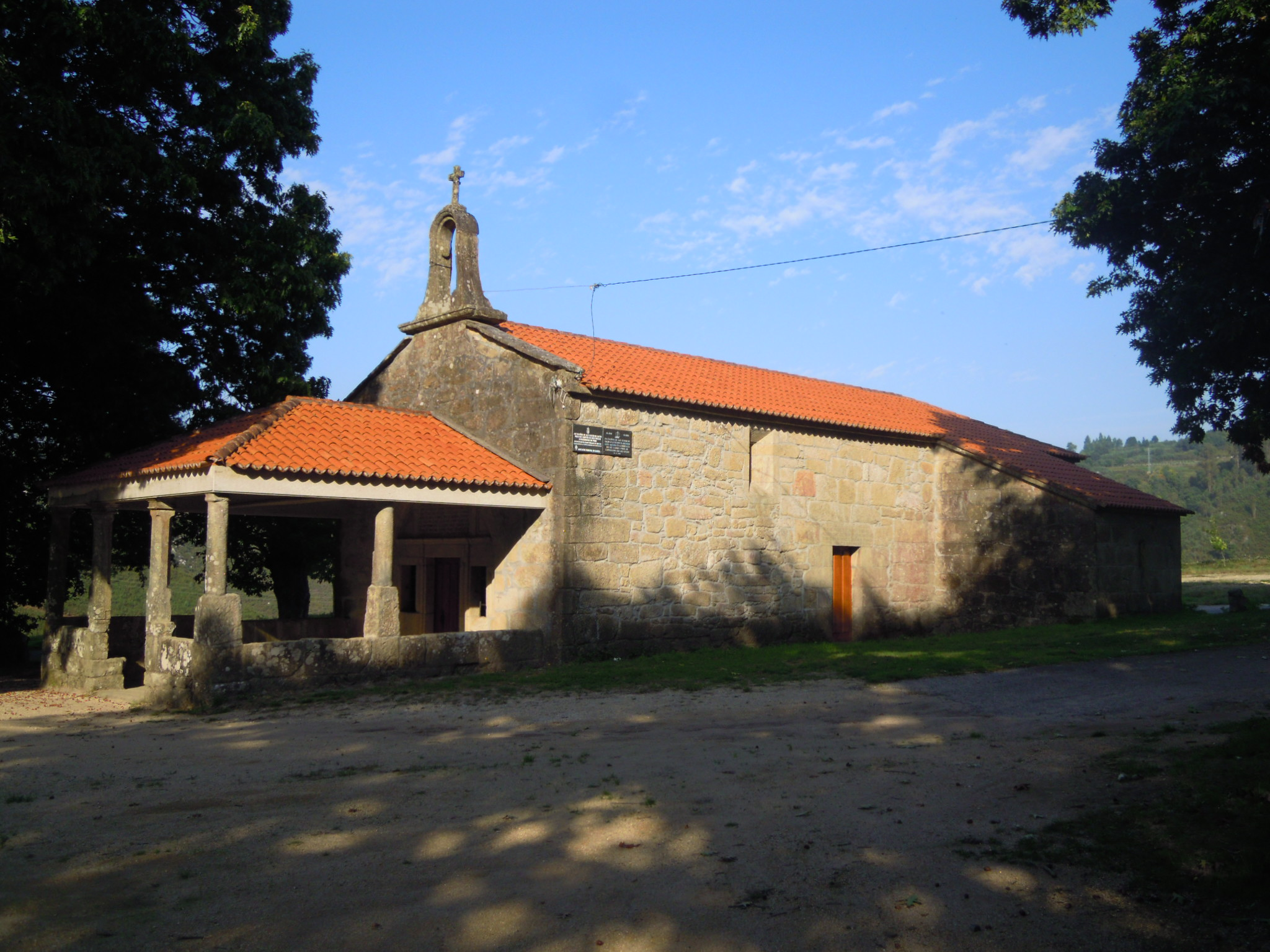
Chapel of San Xusto.

It is a traditional gathering place and a reference for legends and old tales; it contains centuries-old oak trees as well as chestnut and American oak trees. Once extensive in area, it has now greatly diminished.

Between 1990 and 1996, there was a dispute over the ownership of the carballeira between the parishioners of San Xurxo de Sacos and the Archdiocese of Santiago de Compostela. On June 6, 1990, the parish priest Manuel Lorenzo registered in Ponte Caldelas the ownership of this space and the mountain of Lixó on behalf of the Church. After various acts of protest and years of confrontation, the Provincial Court and the Supreme Court upheld the resolution issued by a preliminary court that sided with the parishioners. The ownership of the carballeira belongs to the Community of Montes of the parish.

During the wildfire wave of 2006 in Galicia, a strong fire descended from Cerdedo to Pontevedra along the banks of the Lérez River, passing near the carballeira on August 5. The villagers celebrating the pilgrimage had to leave in haste, either to escape the fire or to help extinguish it. Ultimately, the carballeira was saved. In gratitude, a devotee of Saints Xusto and Pastor brought popular singers to the festivities in subsequent years, such as Manolo Escobar, Bertín Osborne, or David Bustamante, attracting thousands of people to the carballeira.

== Architectural heritage ==
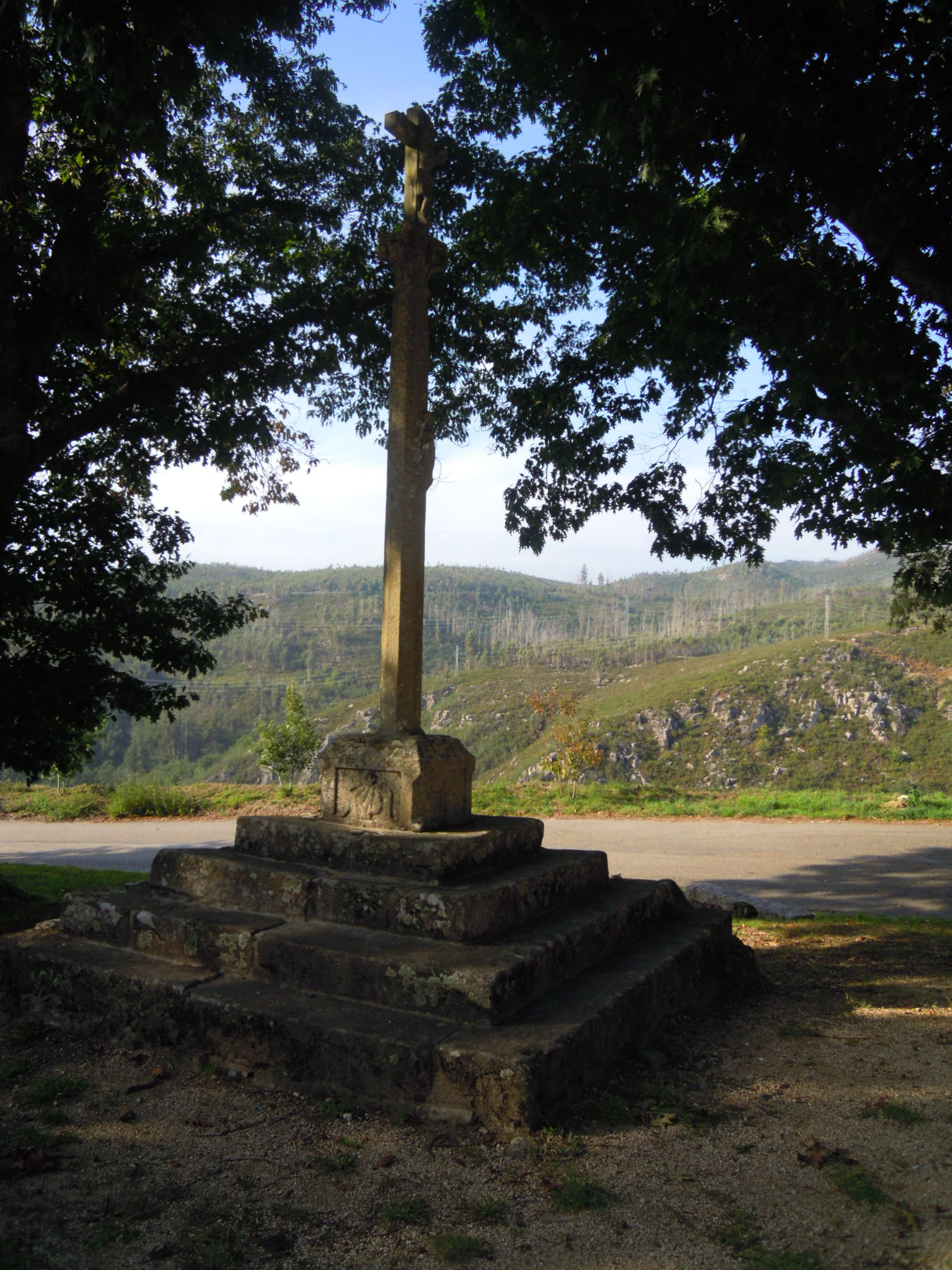
Cruceiro.

It is presided over by a cruceiro and a chapel, where the pilgrimage of Saints Xusto and Pastor is celebrated on August 5 and 6. In the past, the sword dance was performed in the carballeira, and the local youths hunted wild goats by descending the cliffs of the valley. The community and pilgrims participated in the saint's procession through the parish, which included images of various saints as well as the banner of the Agricultural Society of San Xurxo de Sacos, founded in 1903. Some pilgrims came with offerings, bringing coffins and offerings to be bid upon.

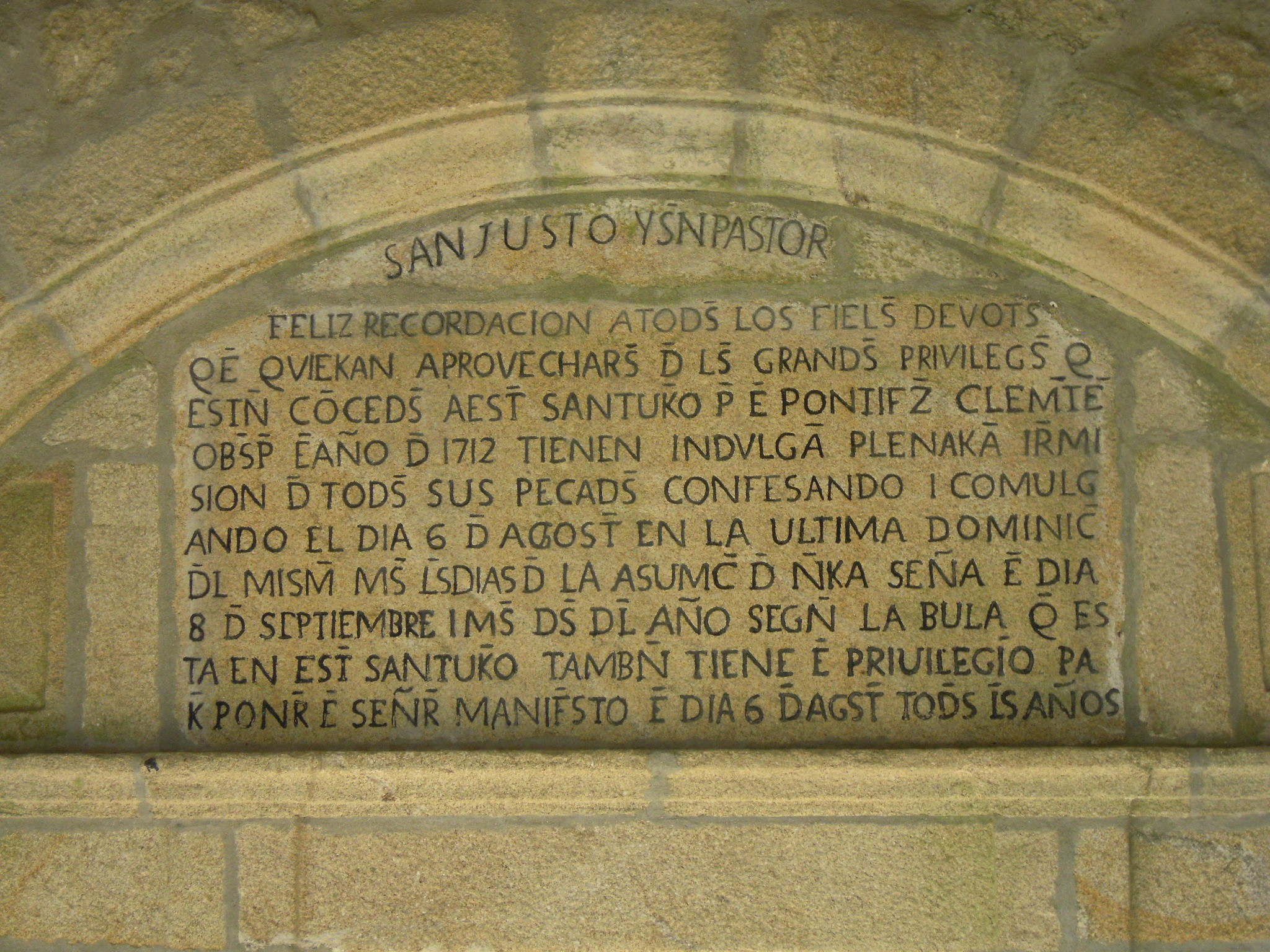
Inscription above the main door.

The small chapel preserves the covered presbytery, from the 15th or 16th century, with a ribbed vault. The nave dates from the 18th century. Above the main door, there is a stone with the following inscription in Spanish (pictured):

[Translation: Saint Just and Saint Shepherd. Happy remembrance to all the faithful devotees who want to take advantage of the great privileges that are granted to this sanctuary by the Pontiff Clemente bishop in the year 1712. They have plenary indulgence and remission of all their sins by confessing and taking communion on August 6 in the last dominic of the same plus the days of the Assumption of Our Lady on September 8 plus two of the year according to the bull that is in this sanctuary also has the privilege to put Ester, Mr. manifest on August 6th every year.]

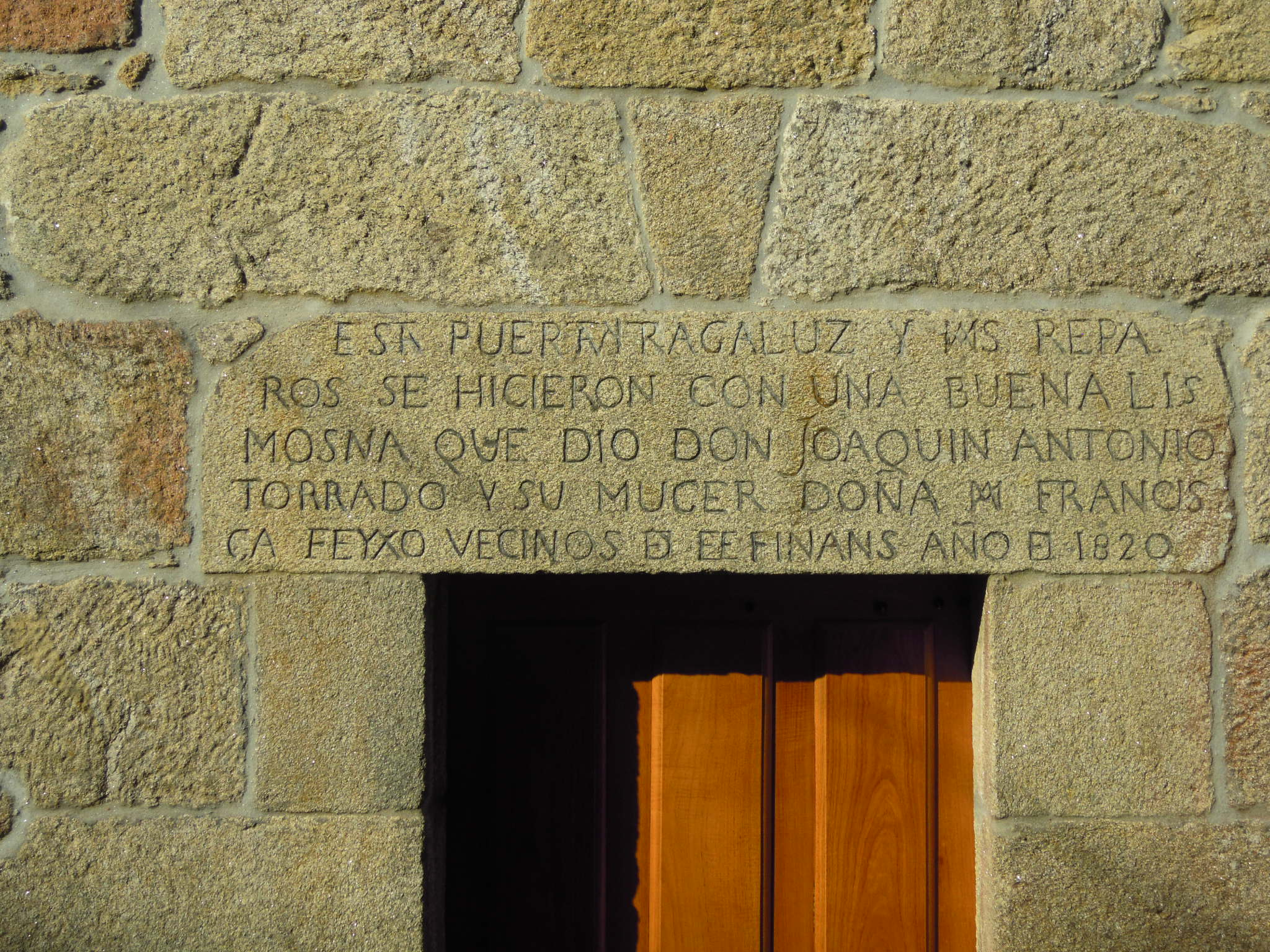
Inscription on the south wall.

Above a door on the southern-side wall, there is another stone with the following inscription in Spanish (pictured):

[Translation: "This skylight door and more repairs were made with the good alms given by Don Joaquín Antonio Torrado and his wife Doña María Francisca Feyxo, neighbors of Fefinans. Year of 1820"]

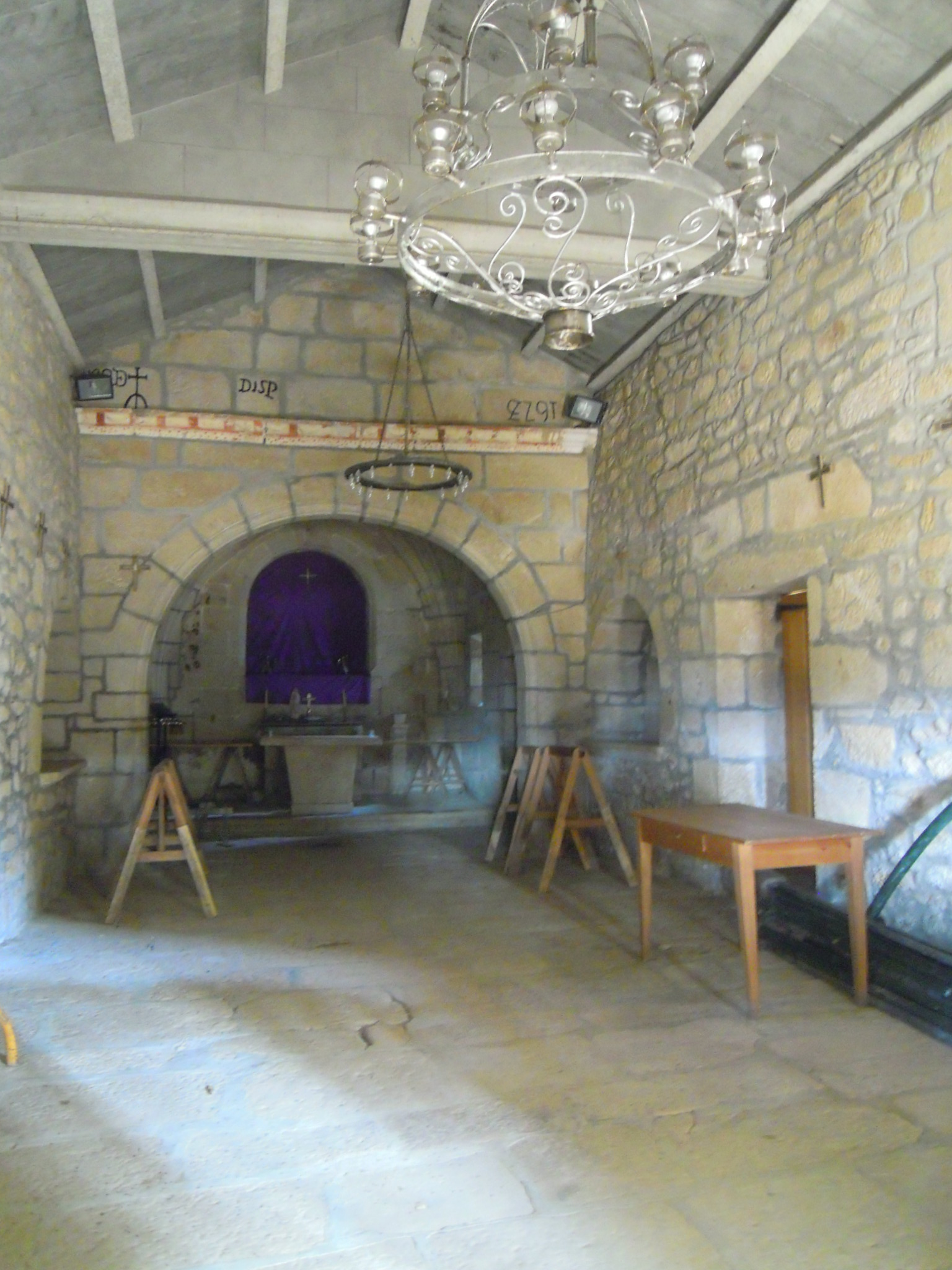
Interior of the chapel.

In June 2007, a statue commemorating the community's struggle was inaugurated, conceived by the sculptor Alfonso Vilar and completed by students of the Escola de Canteiros de Poio. The sculpture includes the following inscription:

Carballeira do San Xusto / carballeira enramada. / ¡Ao pé dous teus cen carballos / plantei a miña palabra! / 1990-1996 Translation: San Justo oak tree / branched oak tree. / At the foot of your two hundred oaks / I planted my word! / 1990-1996

== Gallery ==
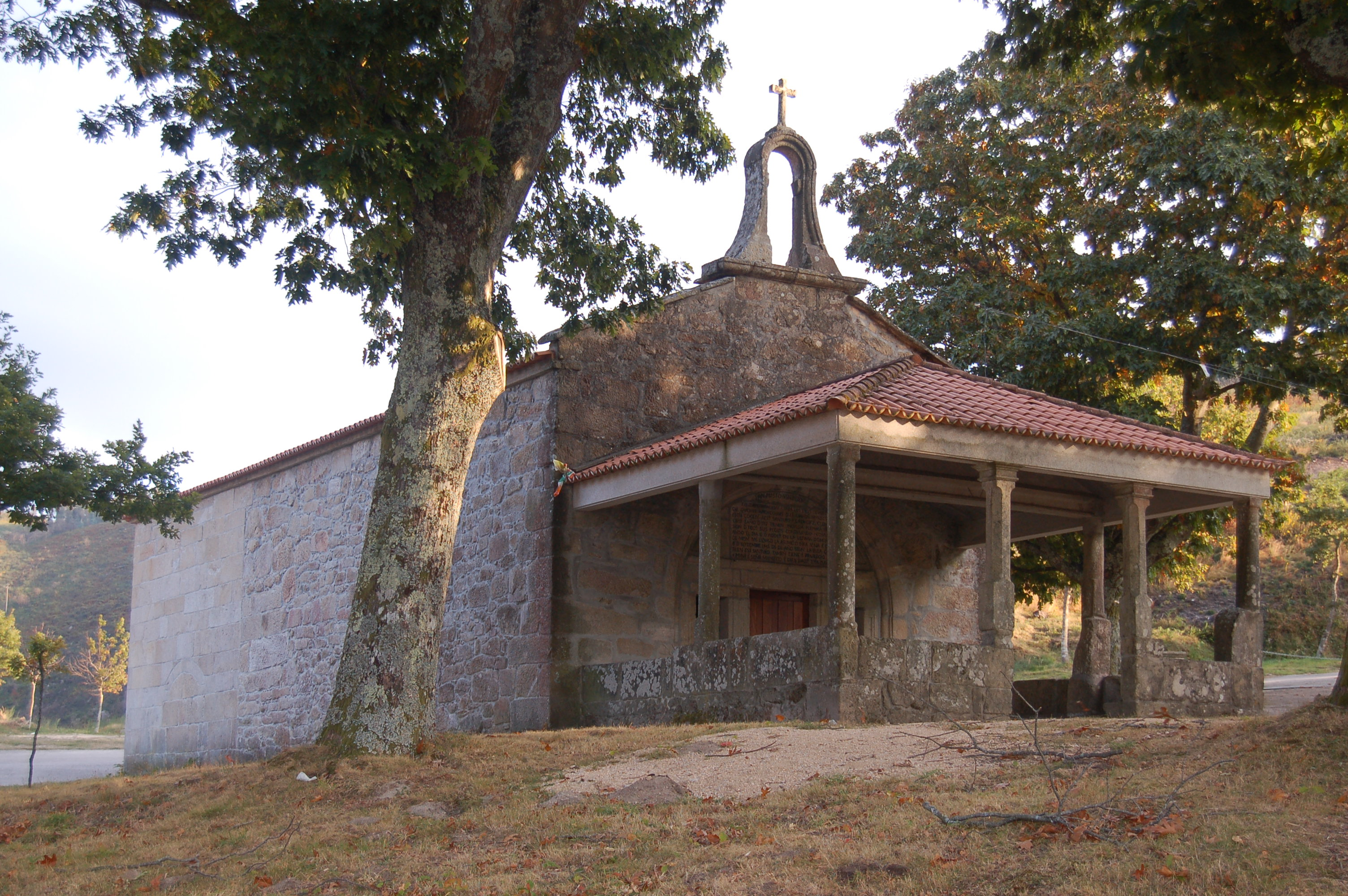
Chapel of Saints Xusto and Pastor.

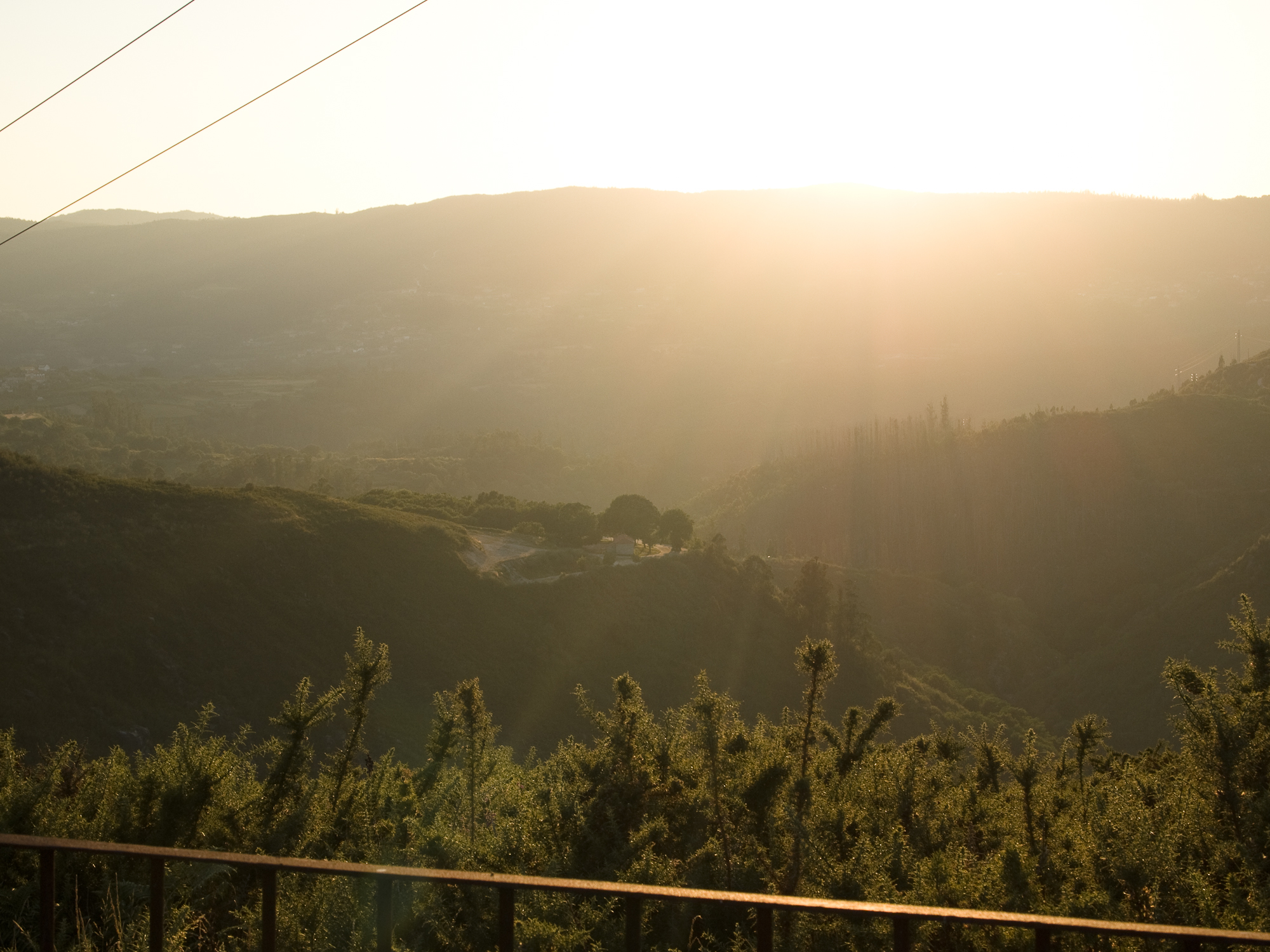
Carballeira de San Xusto.

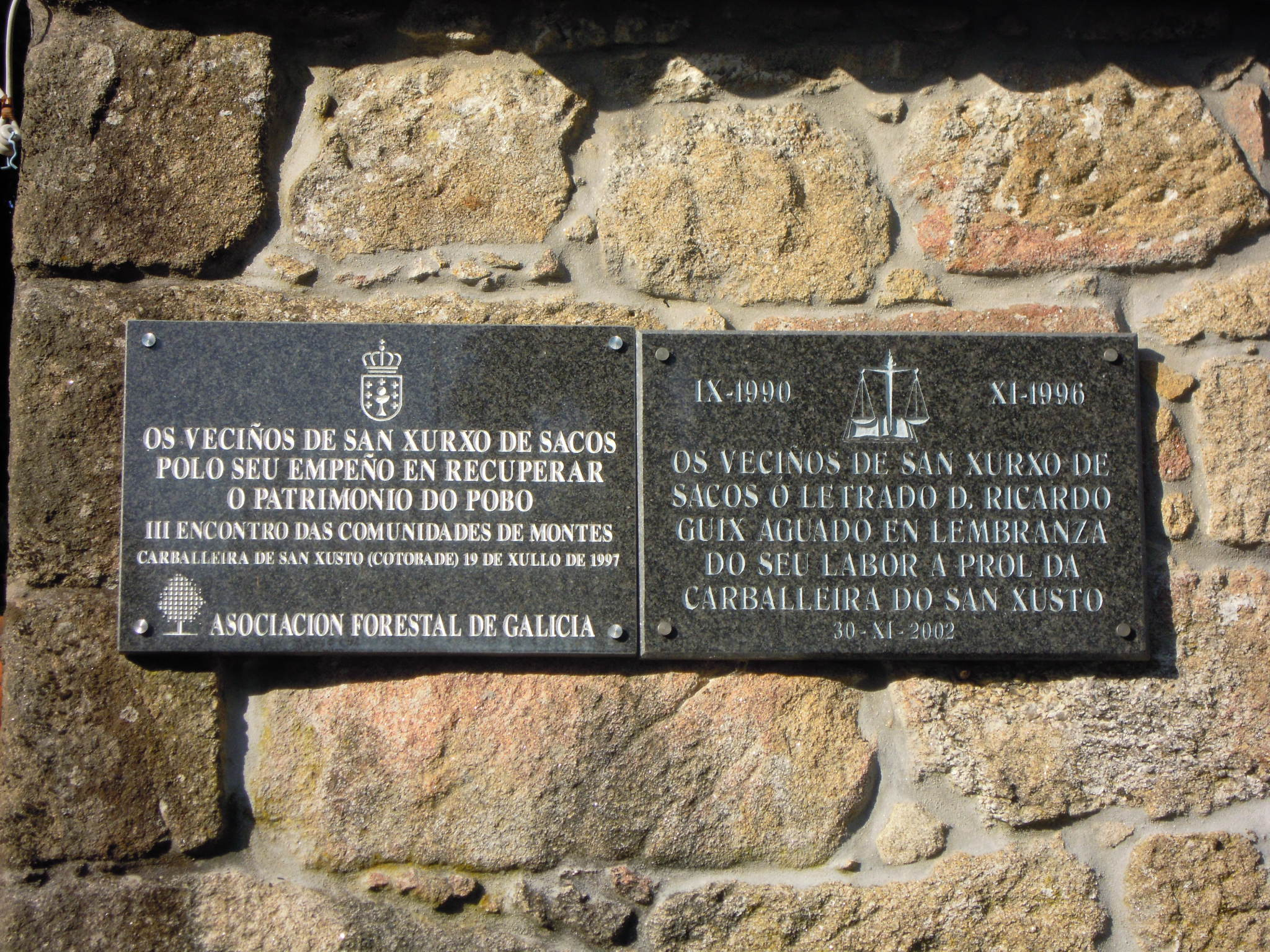
Plaques on the south wall of the chapel.

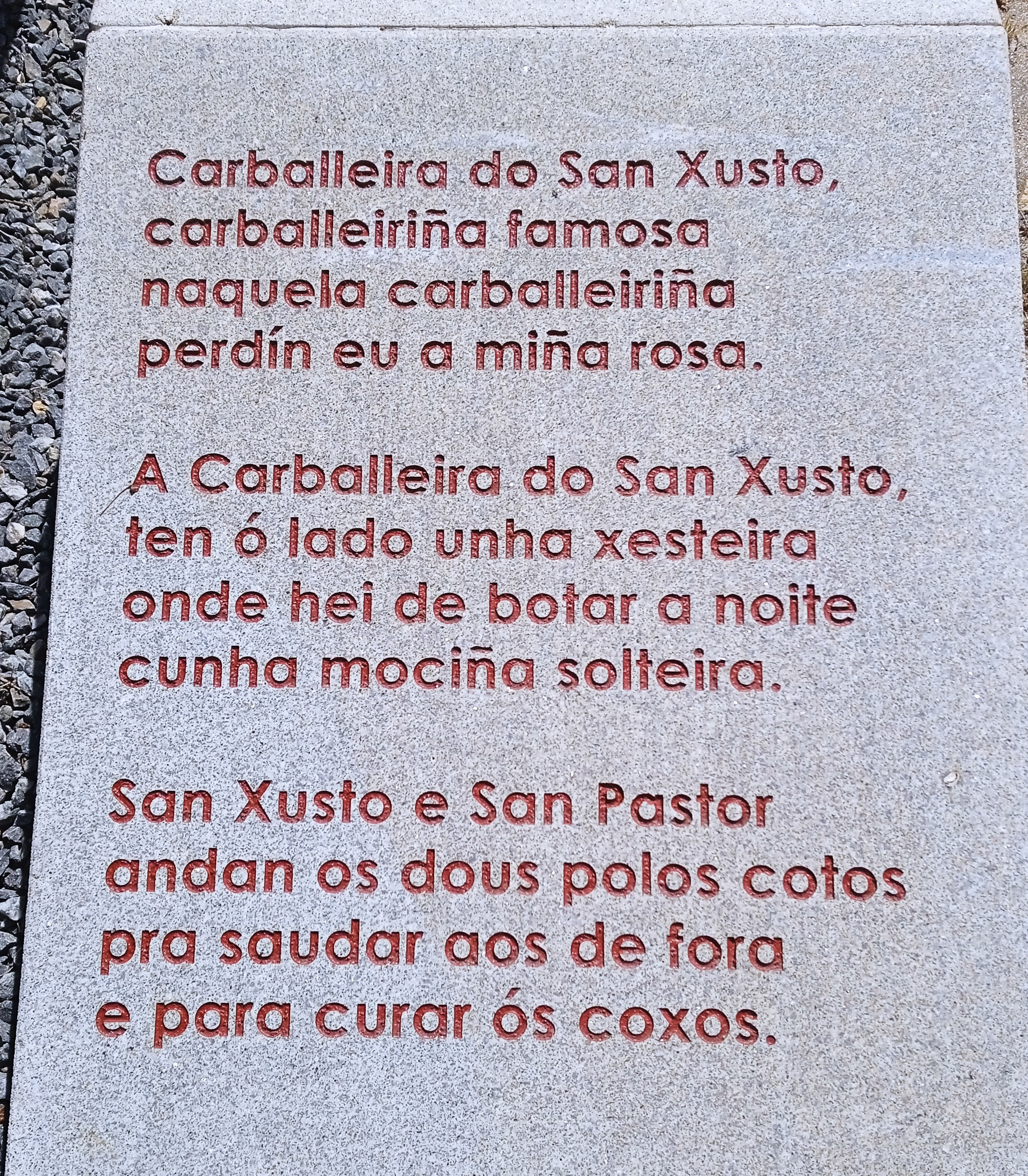
Songs.
