= Forcarei Astronomical Observatory =

Forcarei Astronomical Observatory OAF
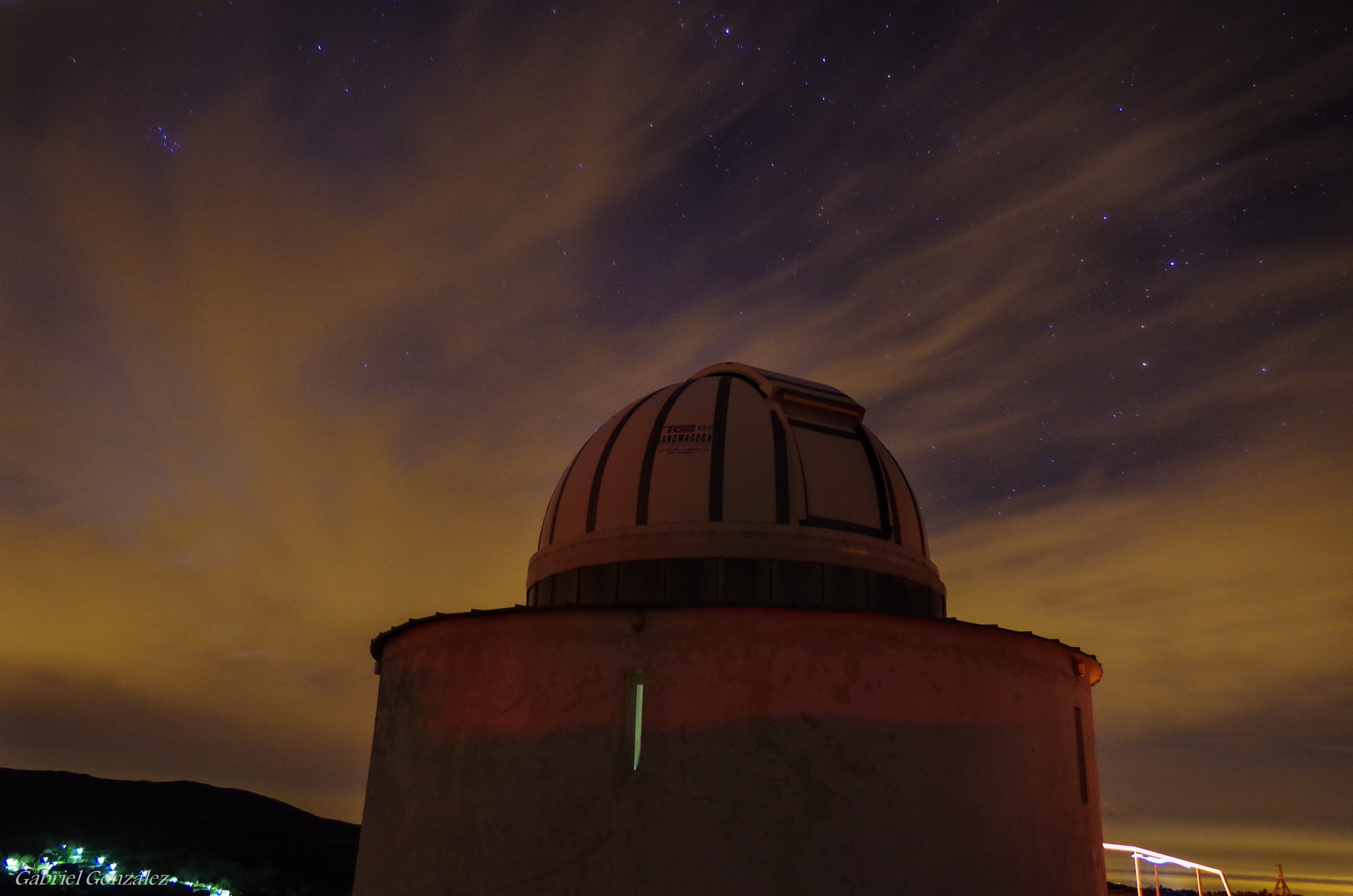
- "Somewhere, something incredible is waiting to be known" - Carl Sagan
- Organization: FC^{3} - Fundación ceo Ciencia e Cultura
- Observatory code: Z62
- Location: Forcarei, Pontevedra, Galicia (Spain)
- Coordinates: 42°36′38.3″N 08°22′15.1″W
- Altitude: 670 meters (2,200 ft)
- Established: 2009
- Website: Observatory´s Official website

Telescopes
- RCOS 20" f/8.1: 20" reflector
- Related media on Commons

The Forcarei Astronomical Observatory is an observatory in the municipality of Forcarei, Spain.

== Location ==
The observatory is located at 670m altitude, on a hill three miles from Forcarei, on the road from A Estrada.

== Equipment and facilities ==
It is a two floor building: there are also several outbuildings at ground level; the main telescope is on the upper one, within a 4m dome. The telescope has a 50 cm reflector with a focal aperture of ca.4 meters and is equipped with a 4008 x 2672 pixel CCD camera.

== History ==
The observatory was opened on 13 March 2009. Public night sessions were first held the same year after Easter. The observatory hosted the 1st Astronomical Meeting as part of the International Year of Astronomy.
