= Currents Bridge =

Tied-arch bridge in Pontevedra, Spain

Currents Bridge Puente de las Corrientes
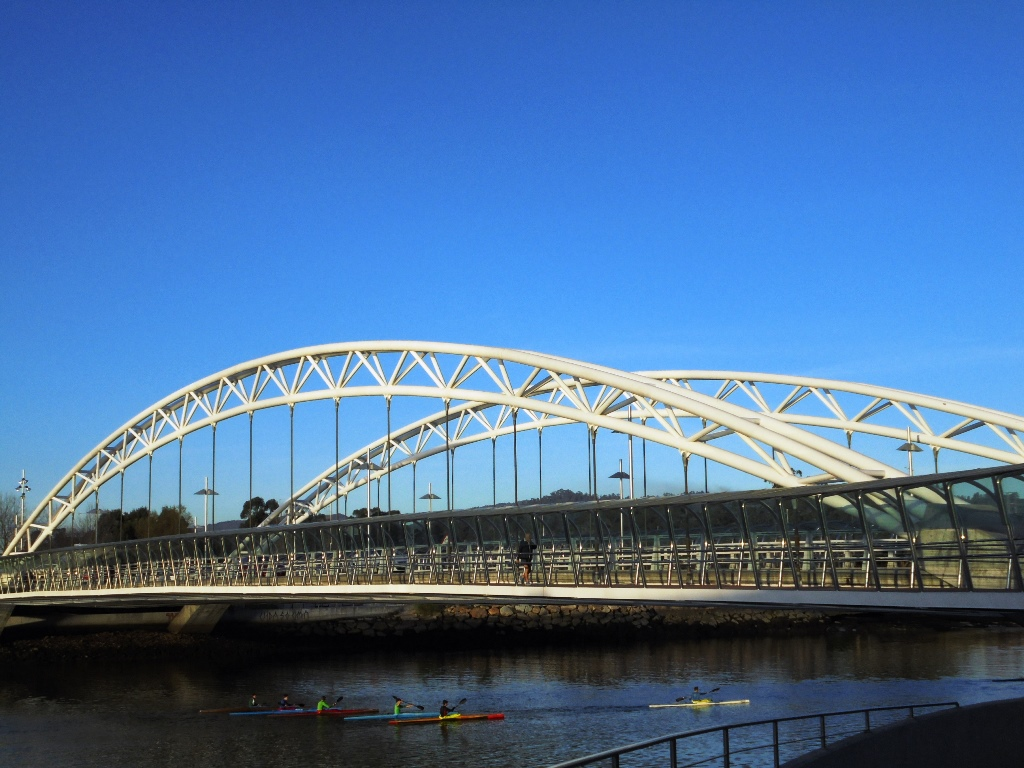
- Currents bridge
- Coordinates: 42.436556°N 8.648301°W
- Carries: Motor vehicles, bicycles and pedestrians
- Crosses: Lérez River
- Locale: Pontevedra, Spain

Characteristics
- Design: Tied-arch
- Material: Steel and reinforced concrete
- Total length: 138 m (453 ft)
- Width: 30 m (98 ft)
- Height: 10.5 m (34 ft)
- Longest span: 116 m (381 ft)

History
- Construction start: 2008
- Construction end: 2012
- Opened: 28 June 2012

The Currents Bridge (puente de las Corrientes in Spanish), is a tied-arch bridge that crosses the Lérez River in the city of Pontevedra, Spain. It was inaugurated in 2012 and connects Uruguay Avenue and Domingo Fontán Street.

== History ==
The location of the bridge is known as The Currents (Las Corrientes), because this is where the waters of the Rons river meet those of the Lérez river and the ria of Pontevedra. Since 1989, the construction of a new bridge in this place of The Currents was planned to connect the two banks of the Lérez river. However, it was not until the beginning of the 21st century that this idea was taken up again to provide another exit from the city centre to the north and the beaches of the ria de Pontevedra and direct access to the AP-9 motorway,

In 2008, the city council organised an ideas competition to decide on the design of the new bridge. In the end, one of the proposals for an tied-arch bridge was chosen because it combined modernity and integration into the urban environment, as the 10-metre height of its two metal arches was not considered excessive so as not to obstruct the view of the Basilica of Saint Mary Major. Construction of the bridge began on 23 December 2008. It was inaugurated on 28 June 2012 with its opening to road traffic.

== Description ==
This bridge has a total length between abutments (span) of 116 metres. Its main structure consists of two parallel arches made of 10.5-metre high white steel tubes from which 17 steel stays are suspended to support the bridge deck. The steel arches are supported on reinforced concrete foundations. Its structure is light, elegant and diaphanous.

It has two roads in each direction and two cycle paths. On both sides of the bridge there is a covered pedestrian bridge. Pedestrian and cycle traffic is separated from motorised traffic. The functionality of the bridge has been designed with a pedestrian underground passage with natural light through the upper roundabout on Uruguay Avenue. This pedestrian underground passage, which runs under the bridge, is protected on the side of the ria by a glass screen, so that the water can be seen during high tides when the sea level rises.

== Gallery ==
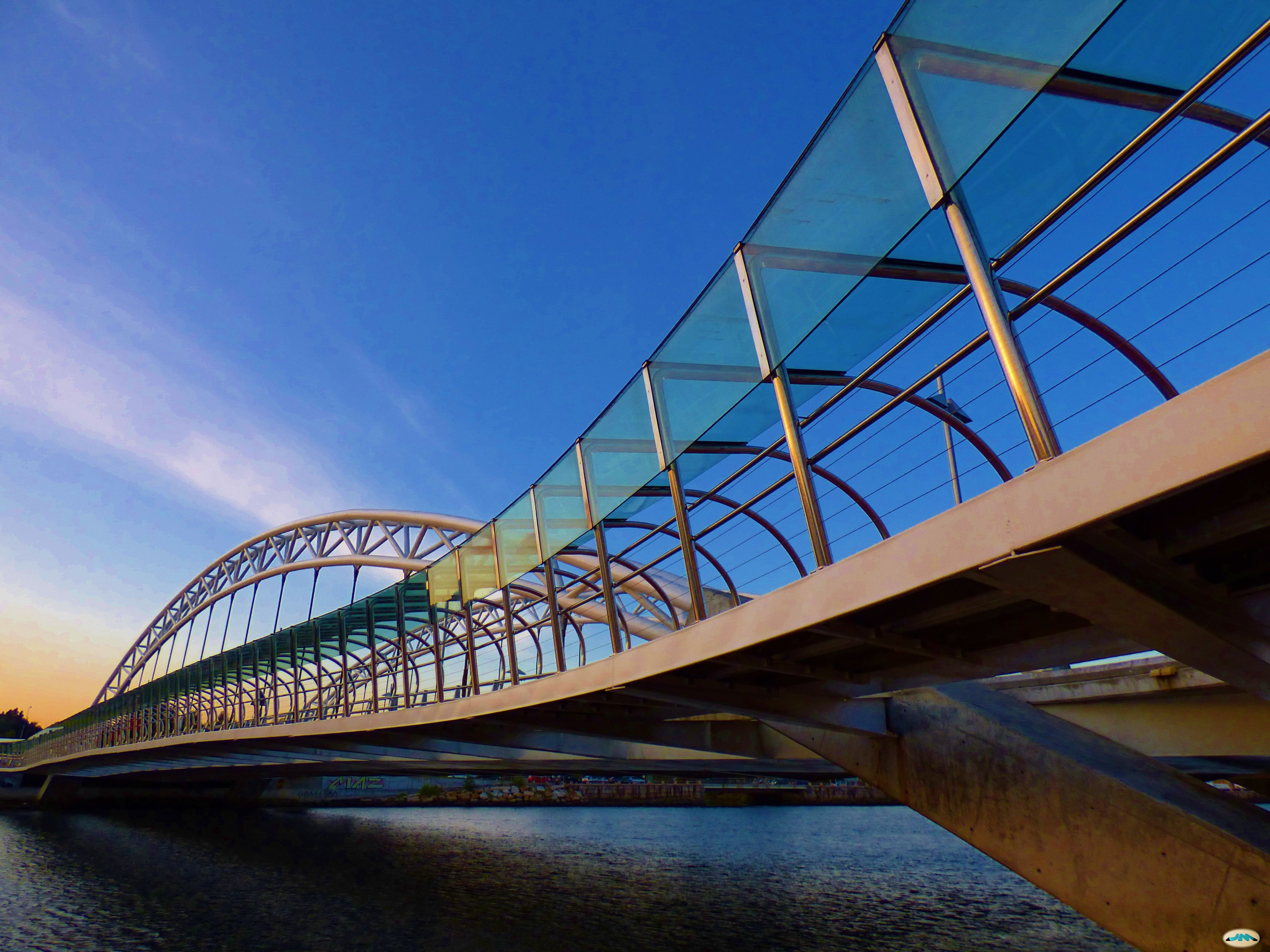

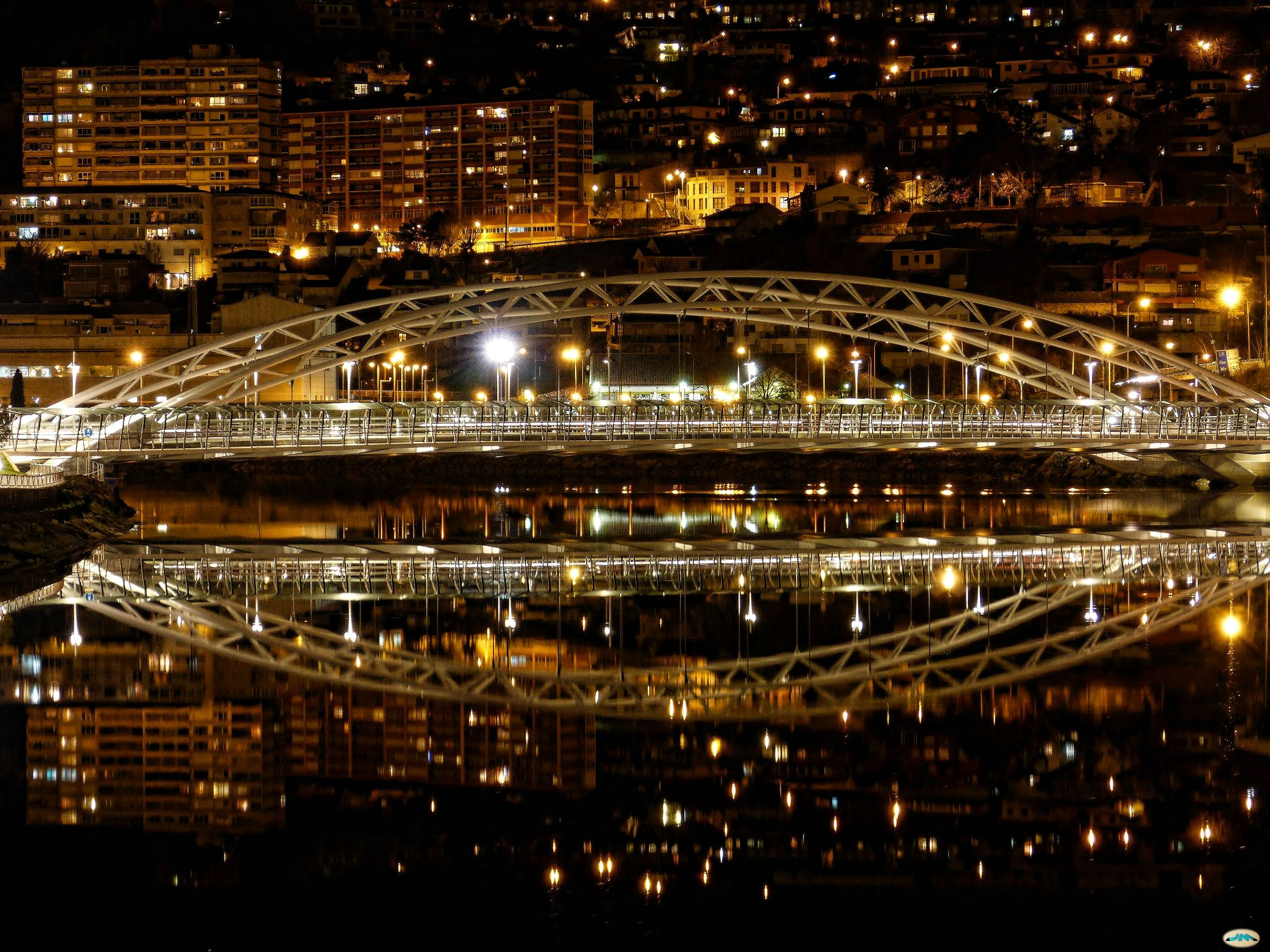
Bridge at night

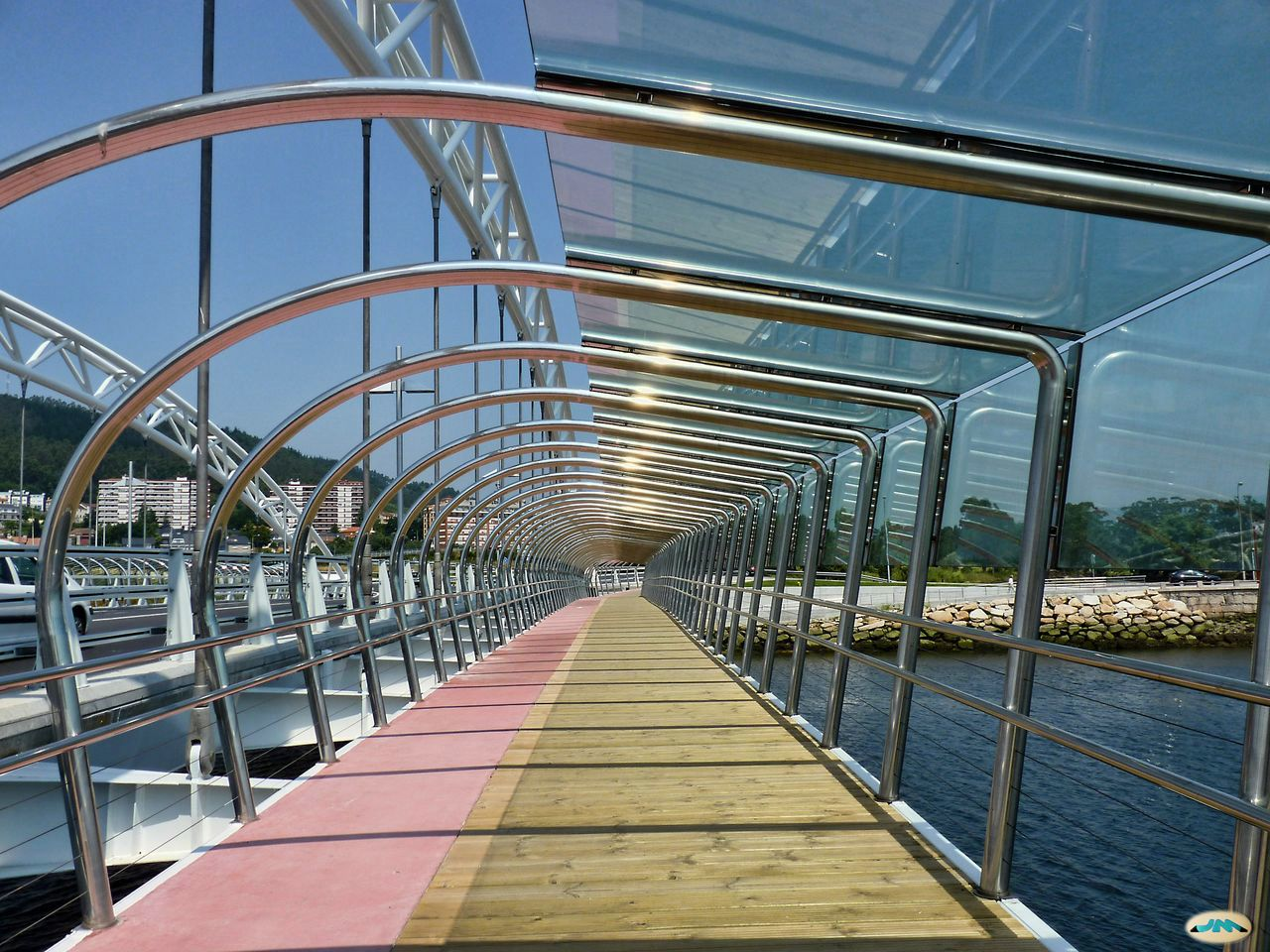
Bicycle path and footbridge

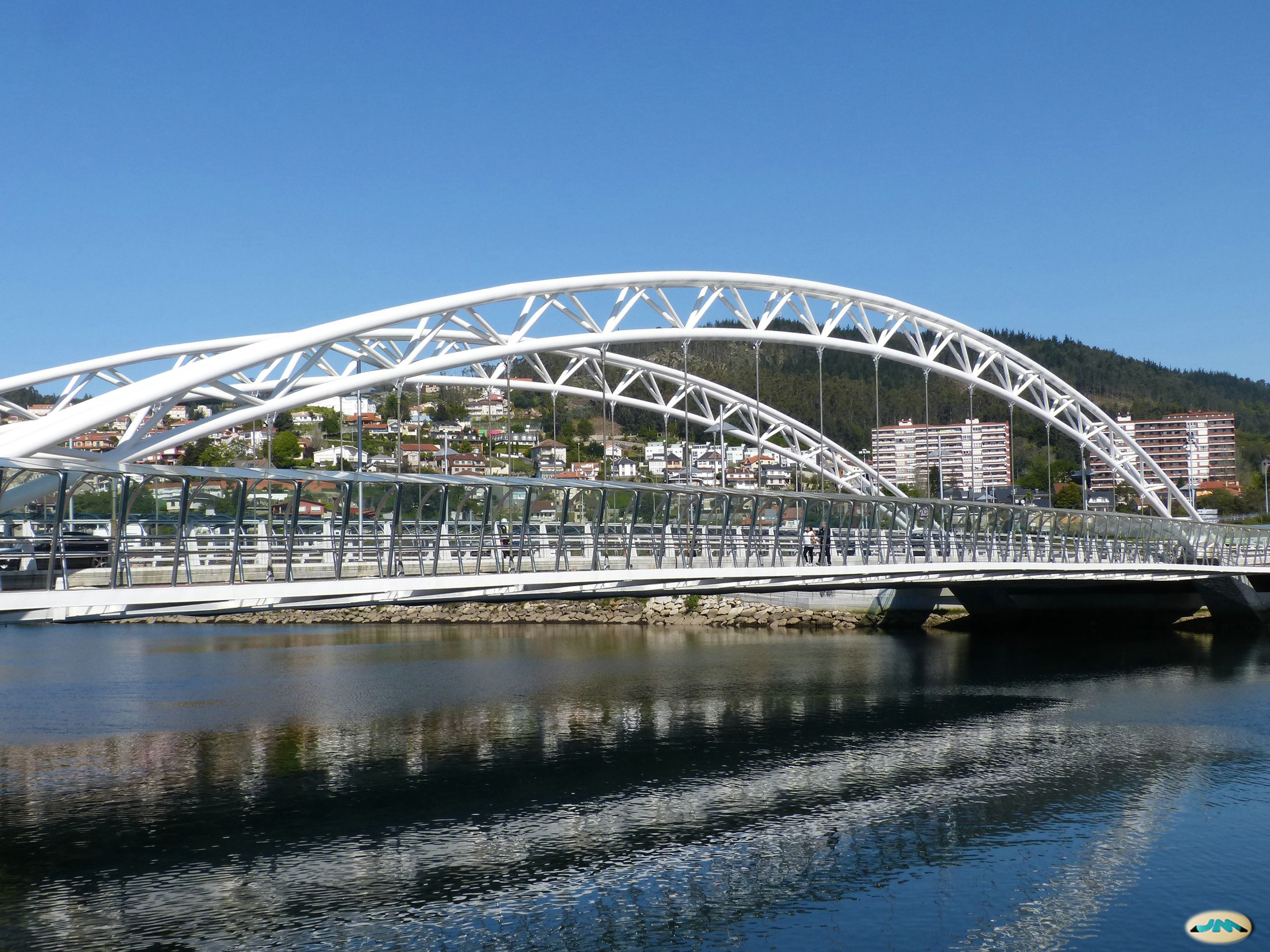

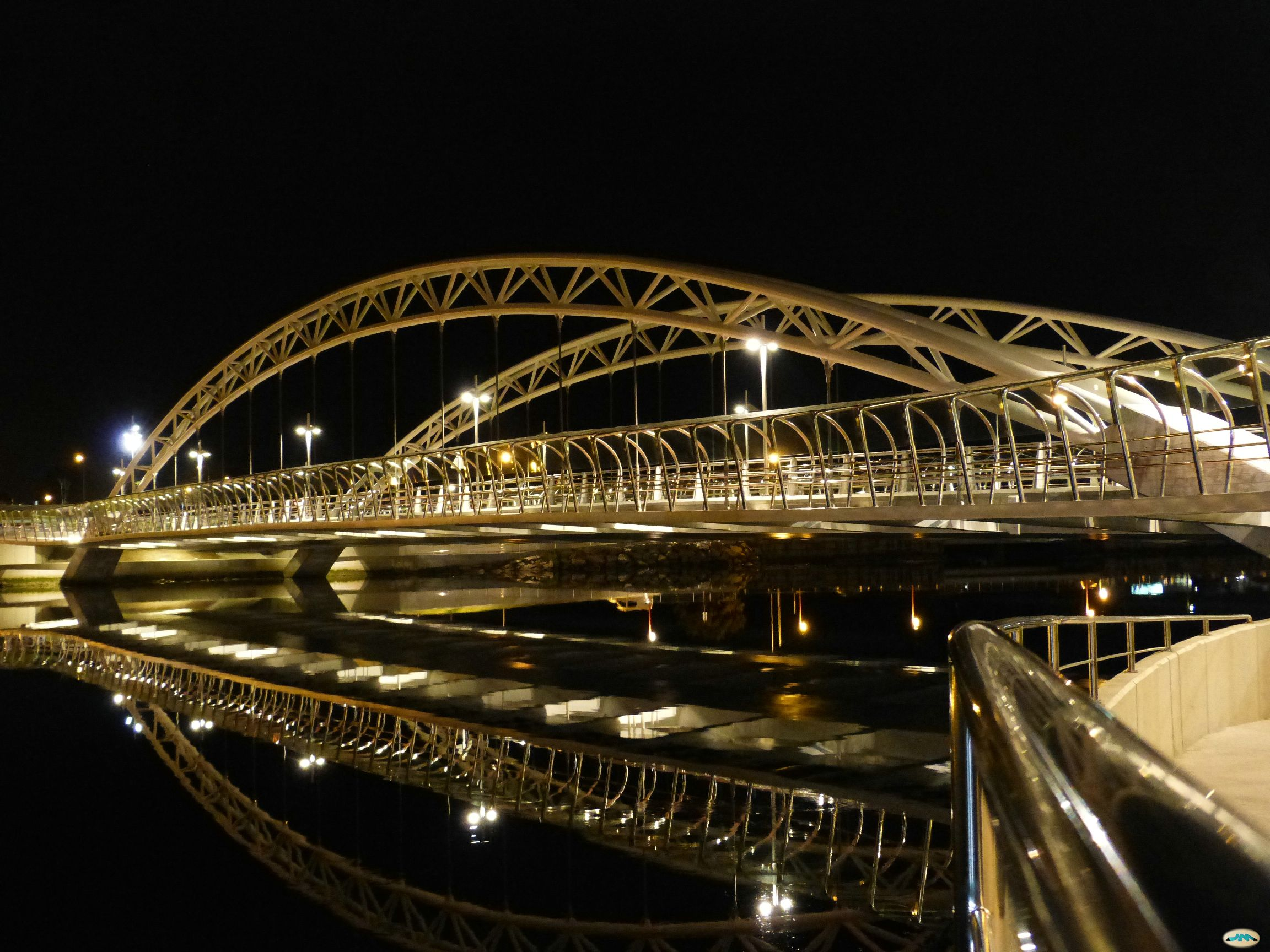

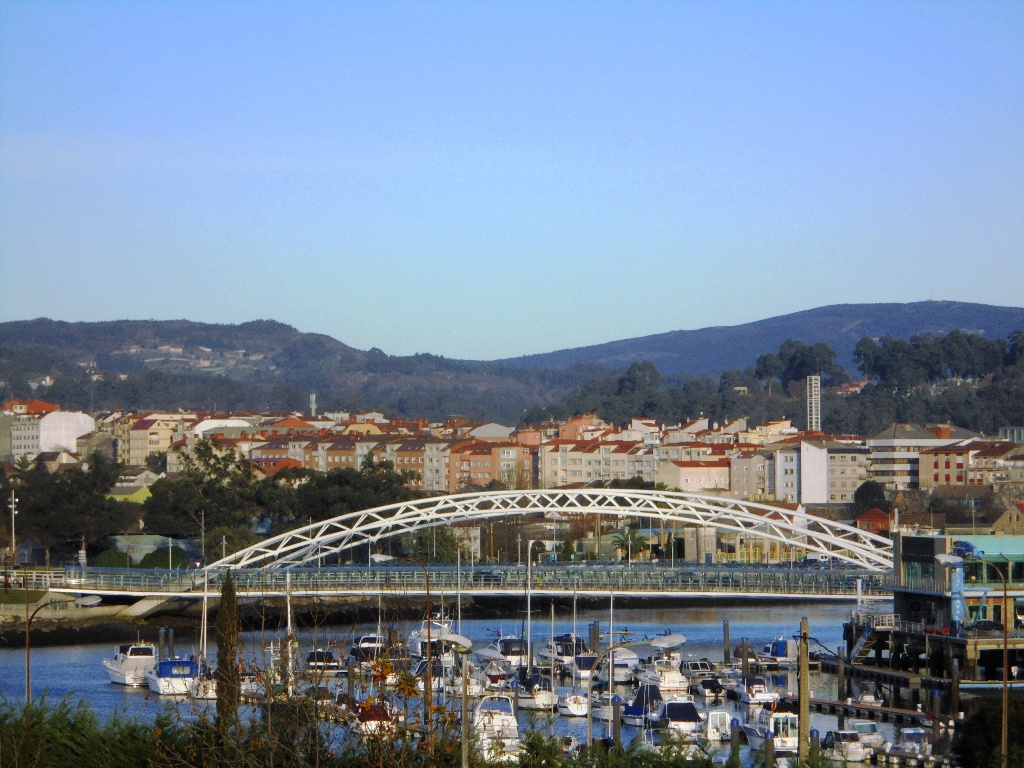
Bridge and marina

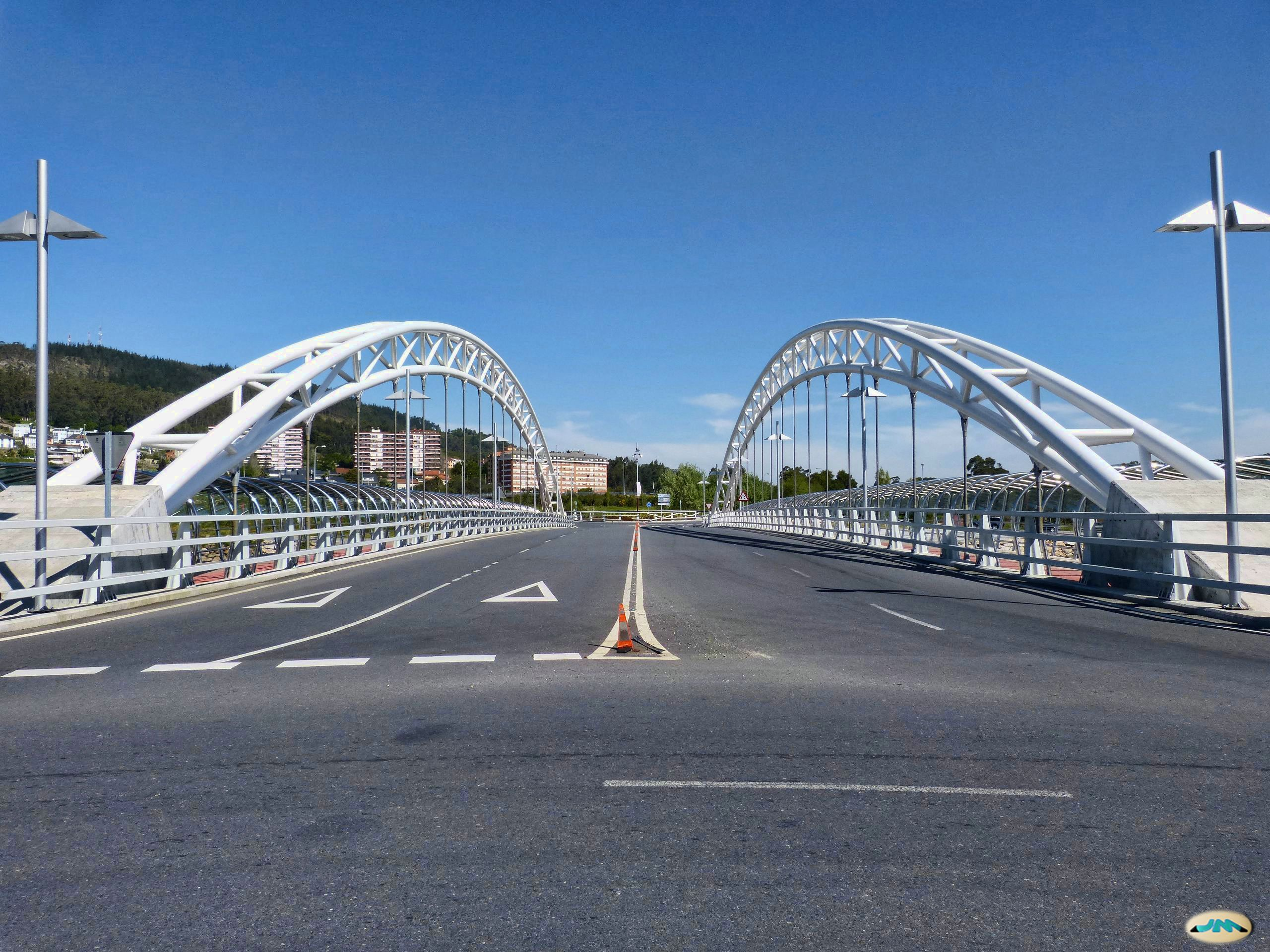

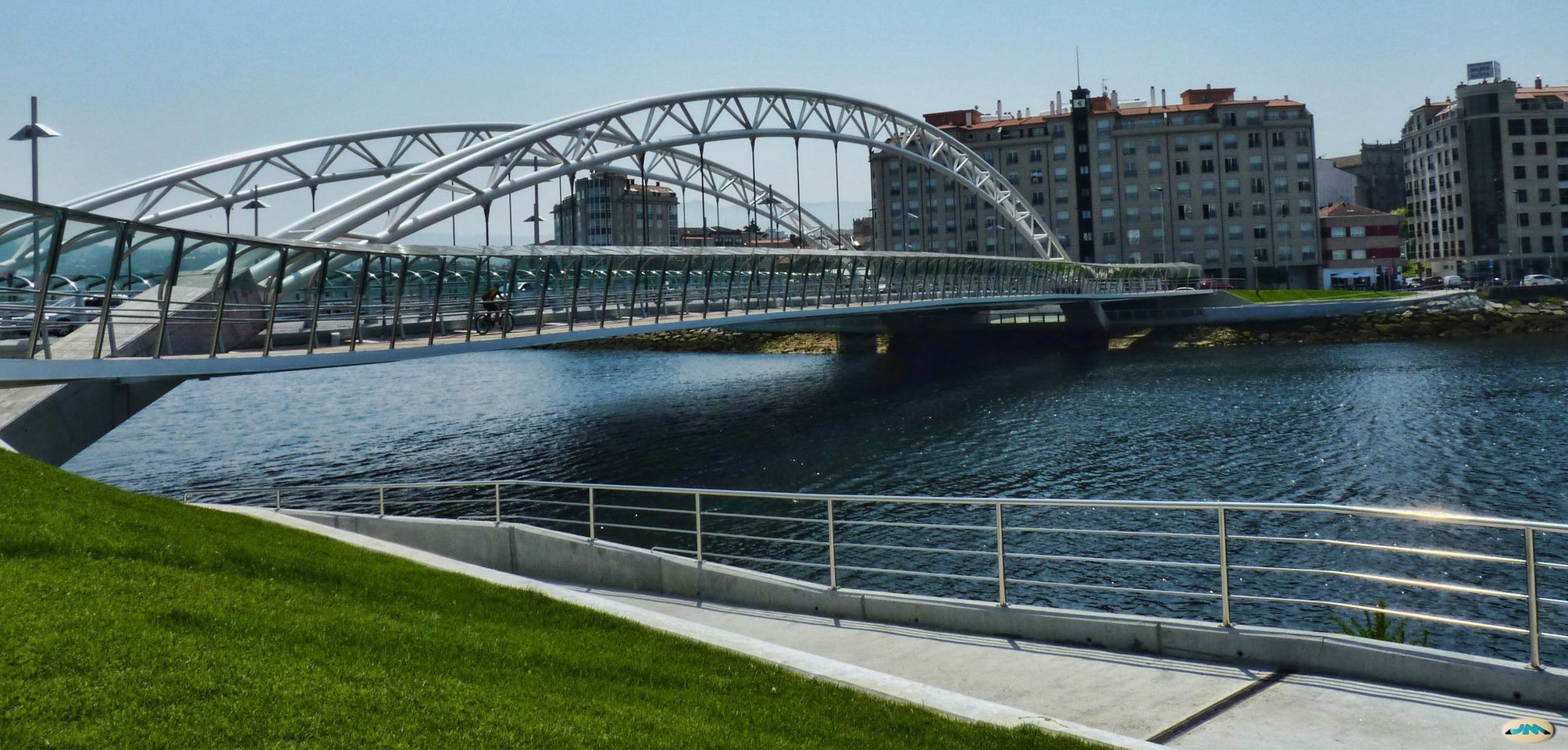

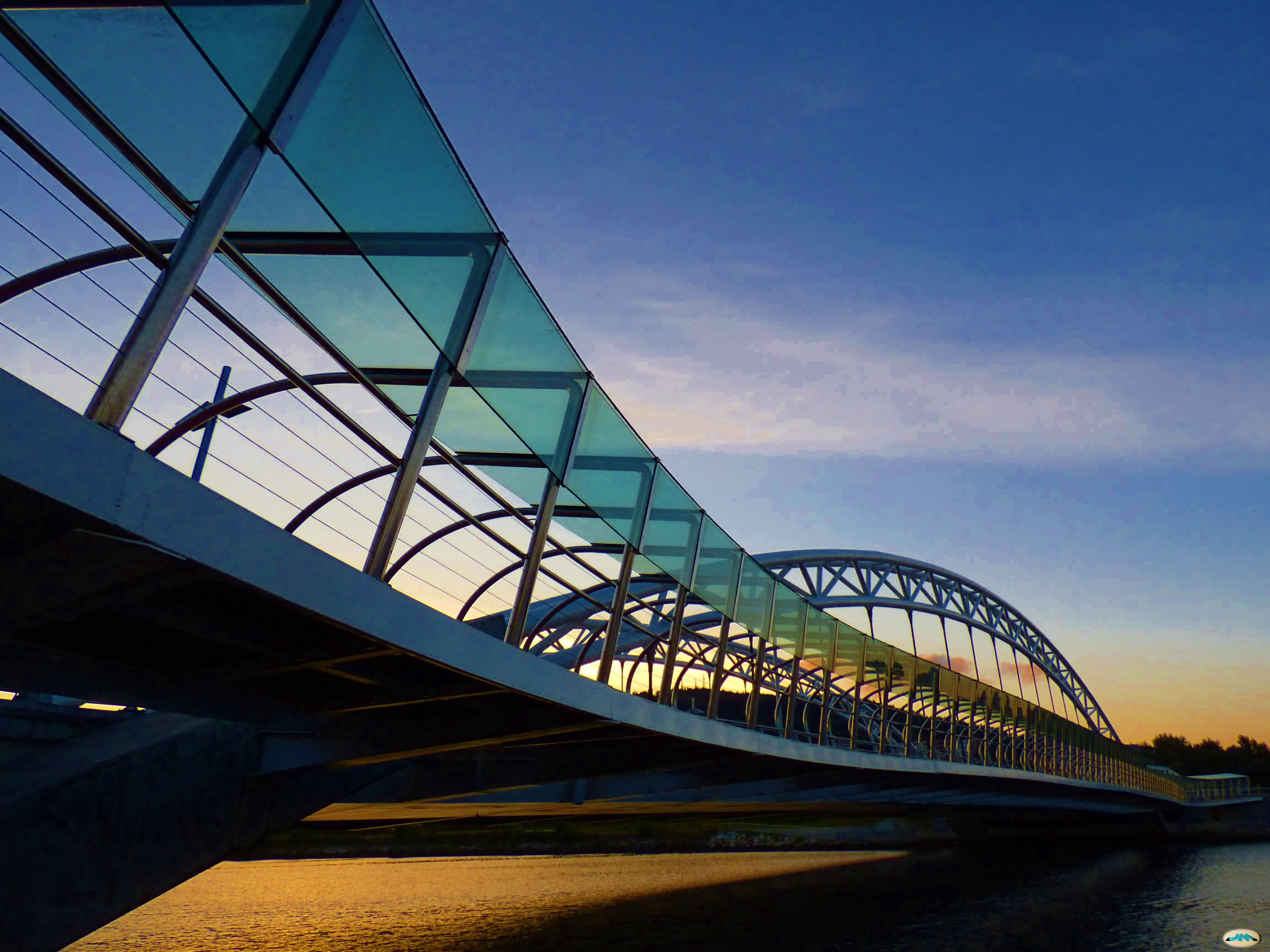

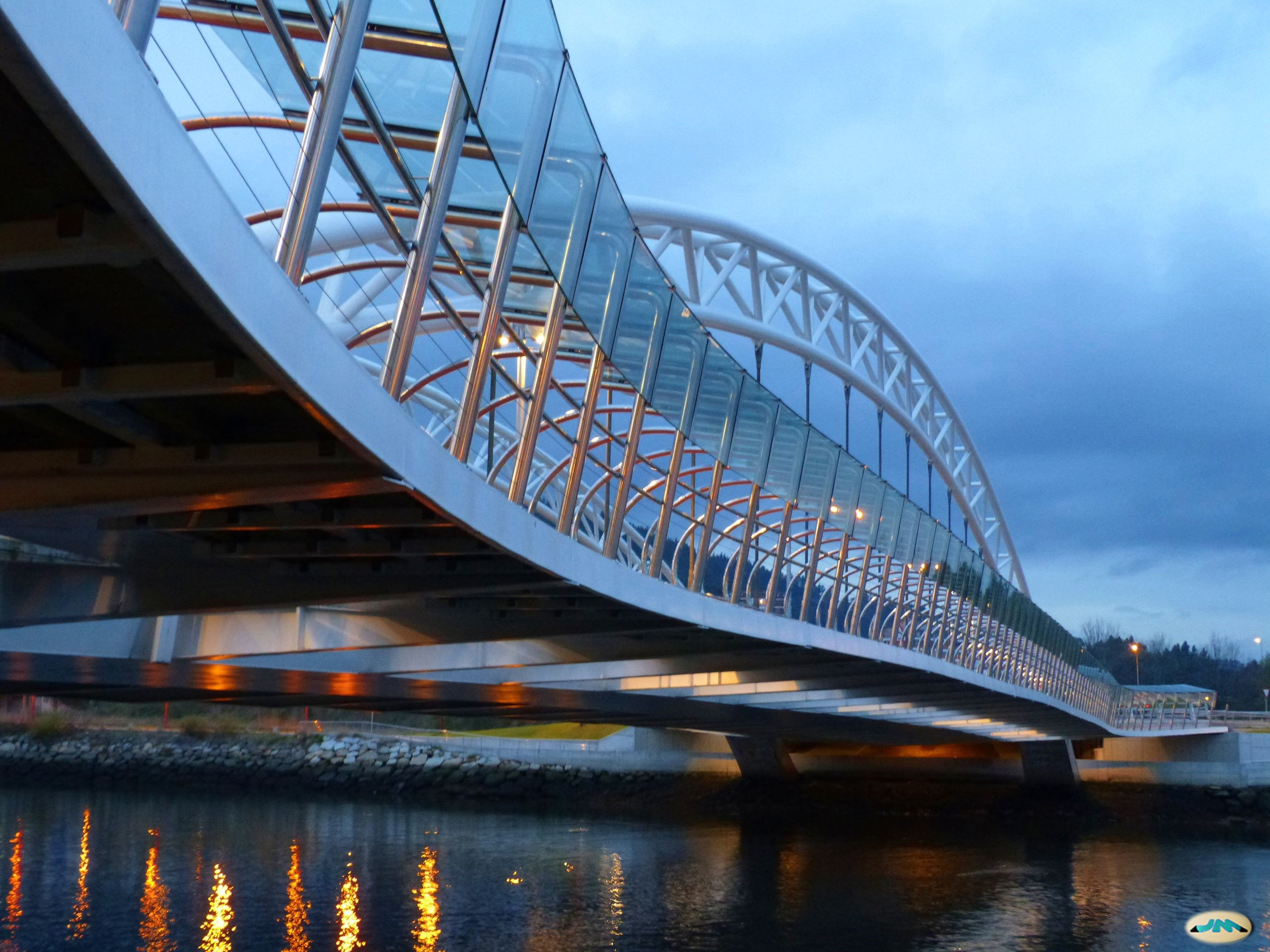

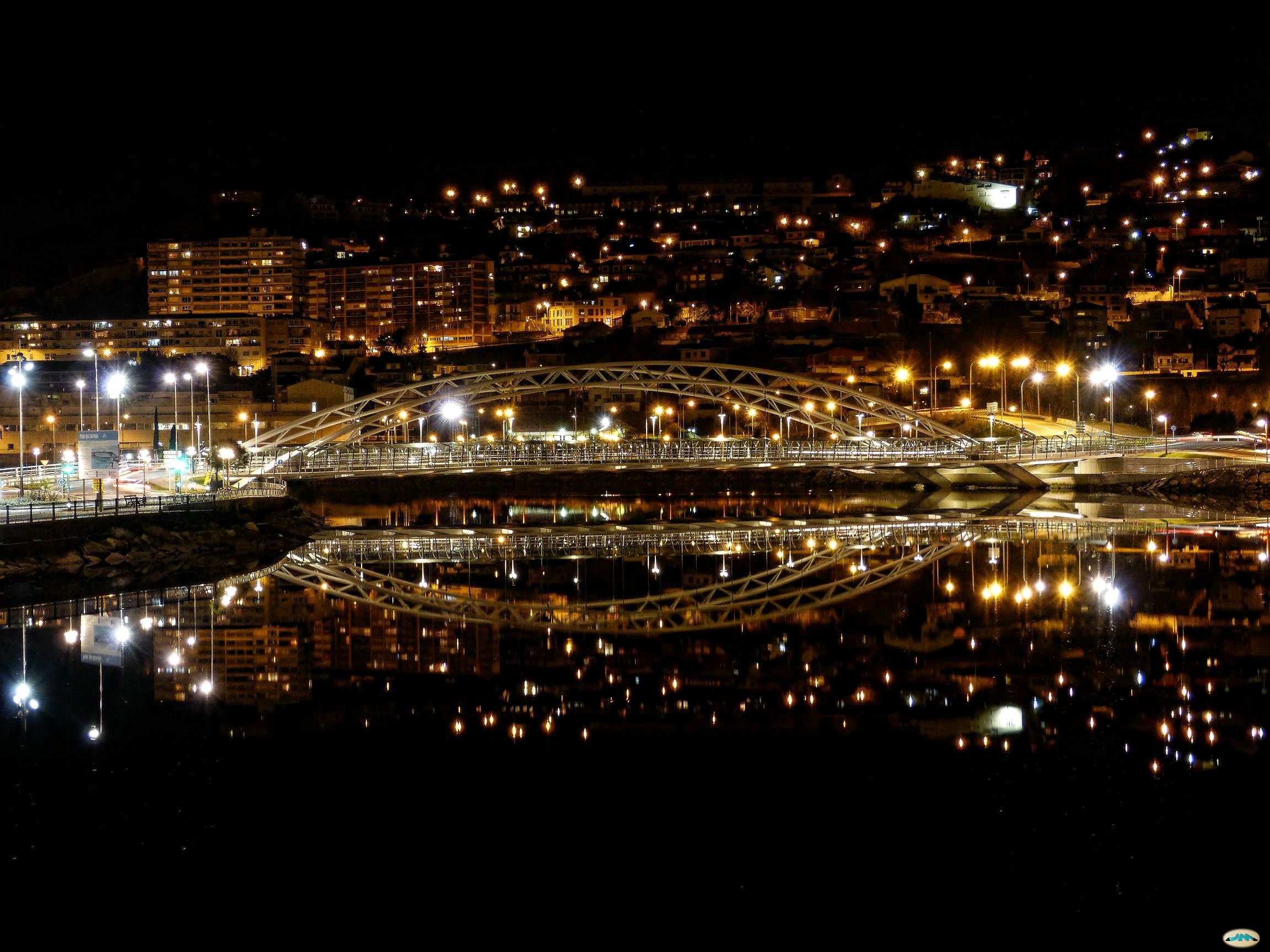

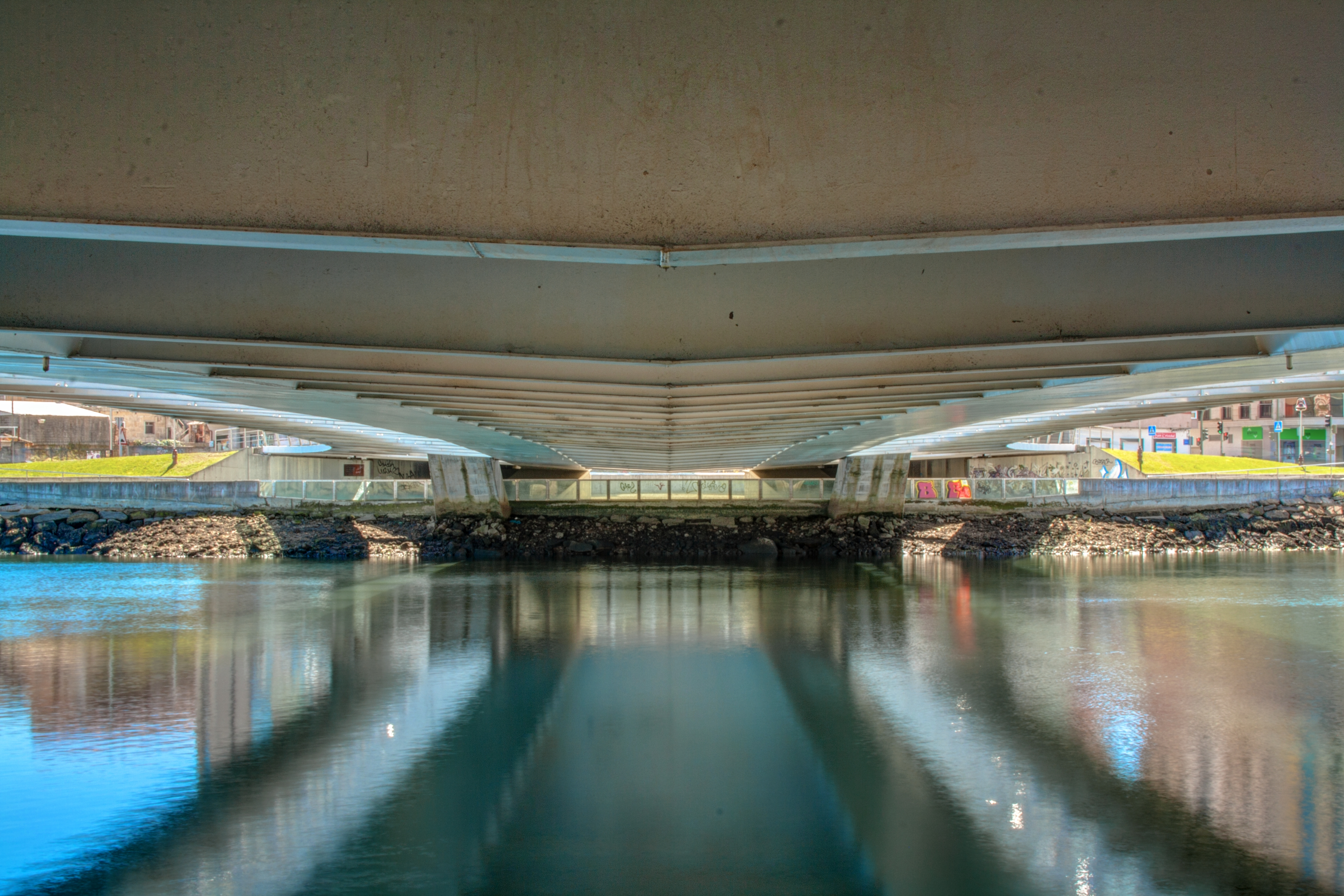
Lower section

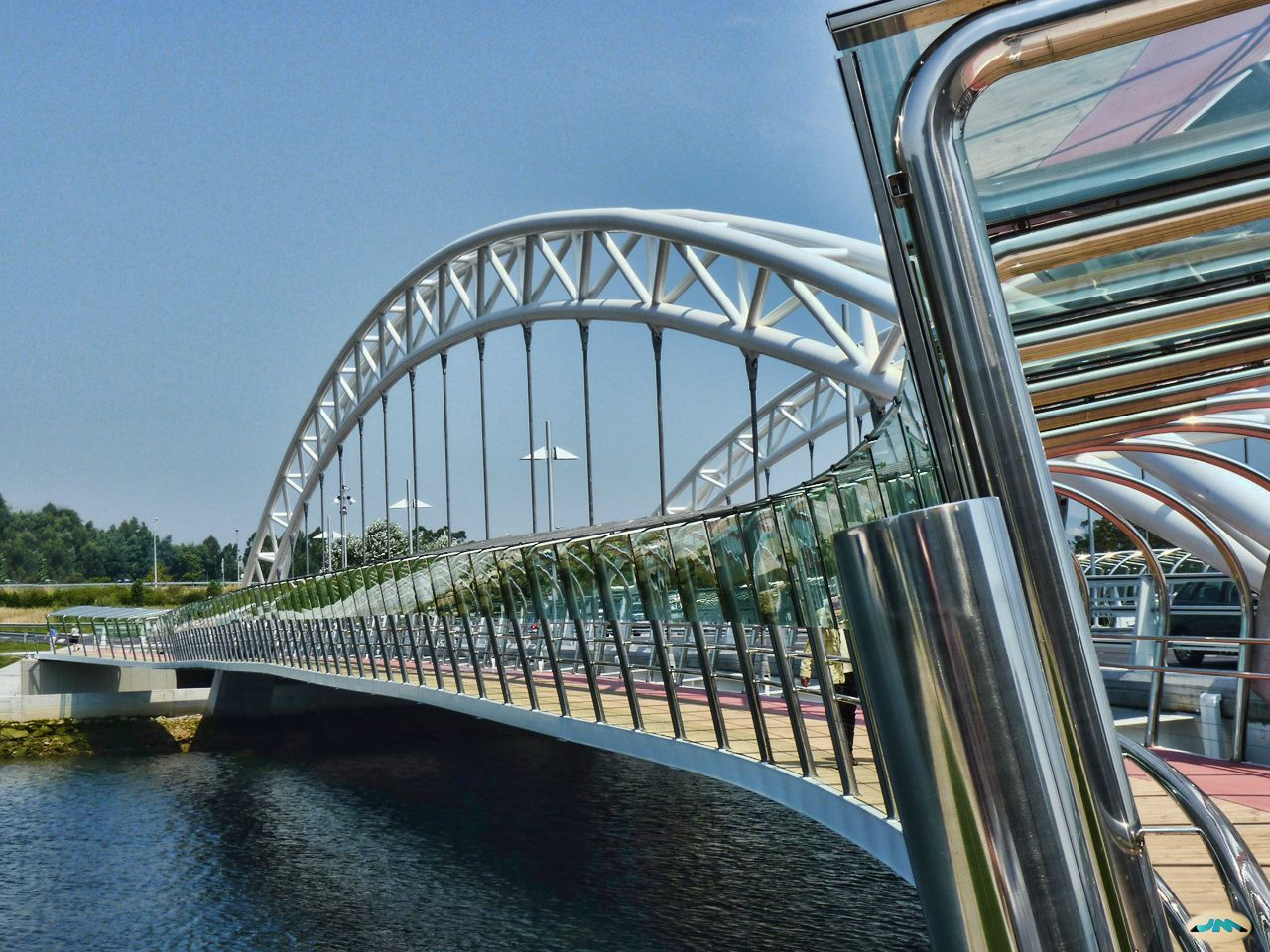
Pedestrian walkway

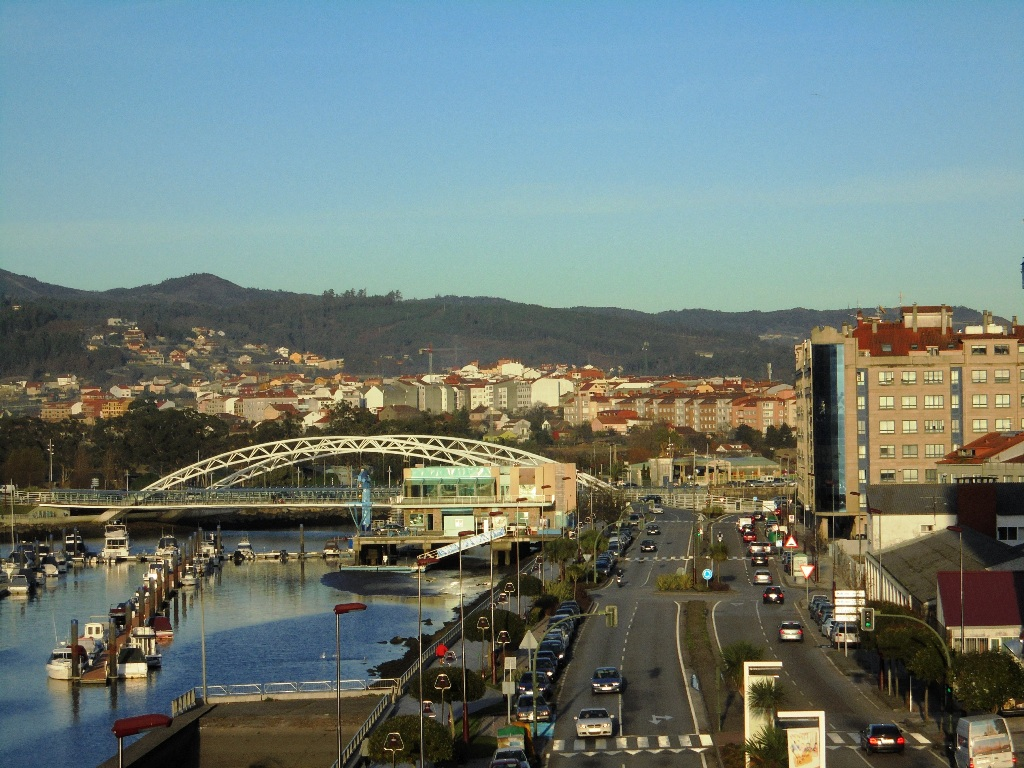
Bridge and Uruguay Avenue

== See also ==
=== Related articles ===
- Tied-arch bridge
- List of bridges in Spain
- Burgo Bridge
- Tirantes Bridge

=== External links ===
- Structurae: Corrientes Bridge.
- Currents Bridge Project
