= Cotobade =

Former local country council in Galicia, Spain

Concello de Cotobade
- Municipality
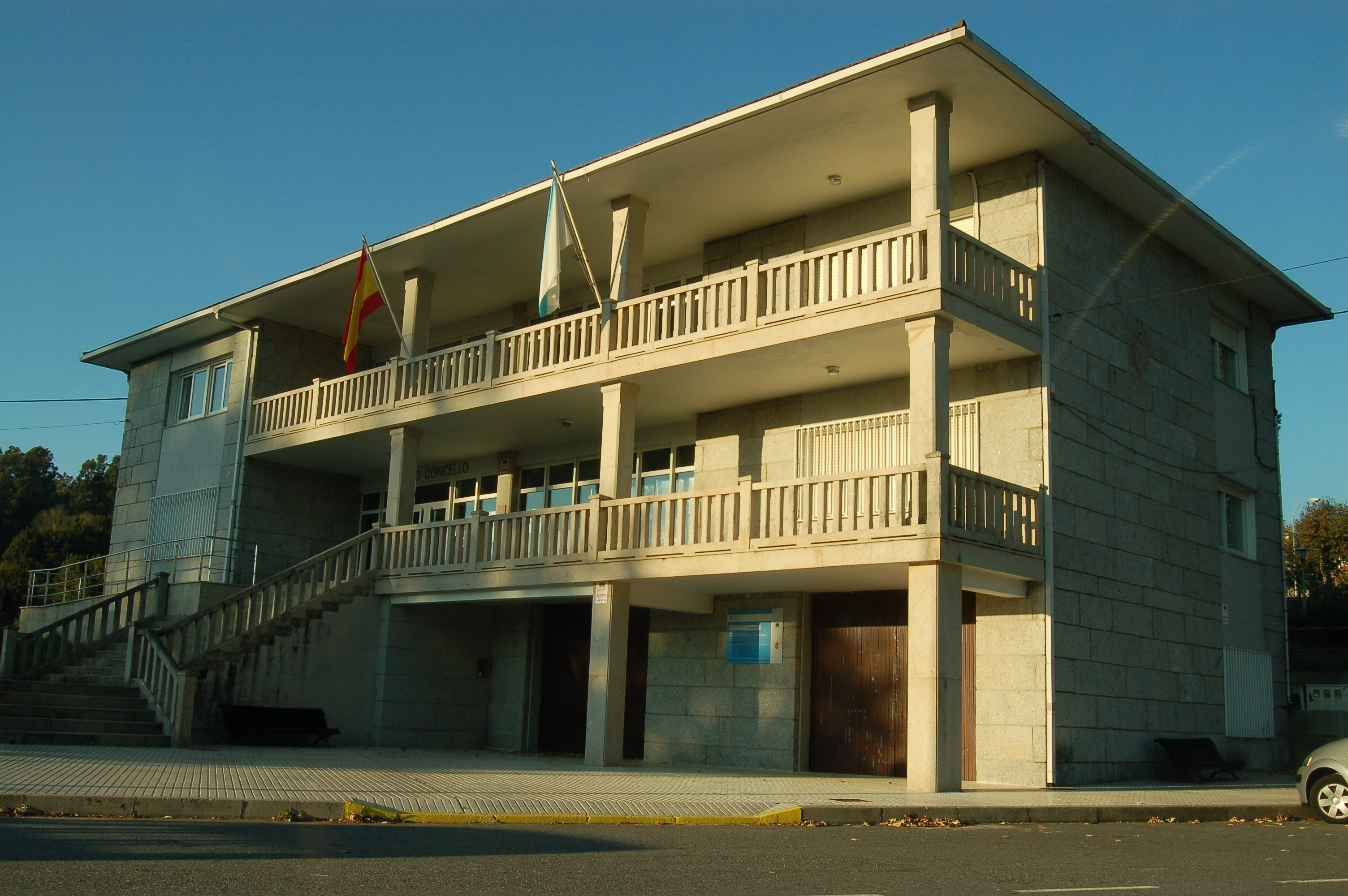

- Seal

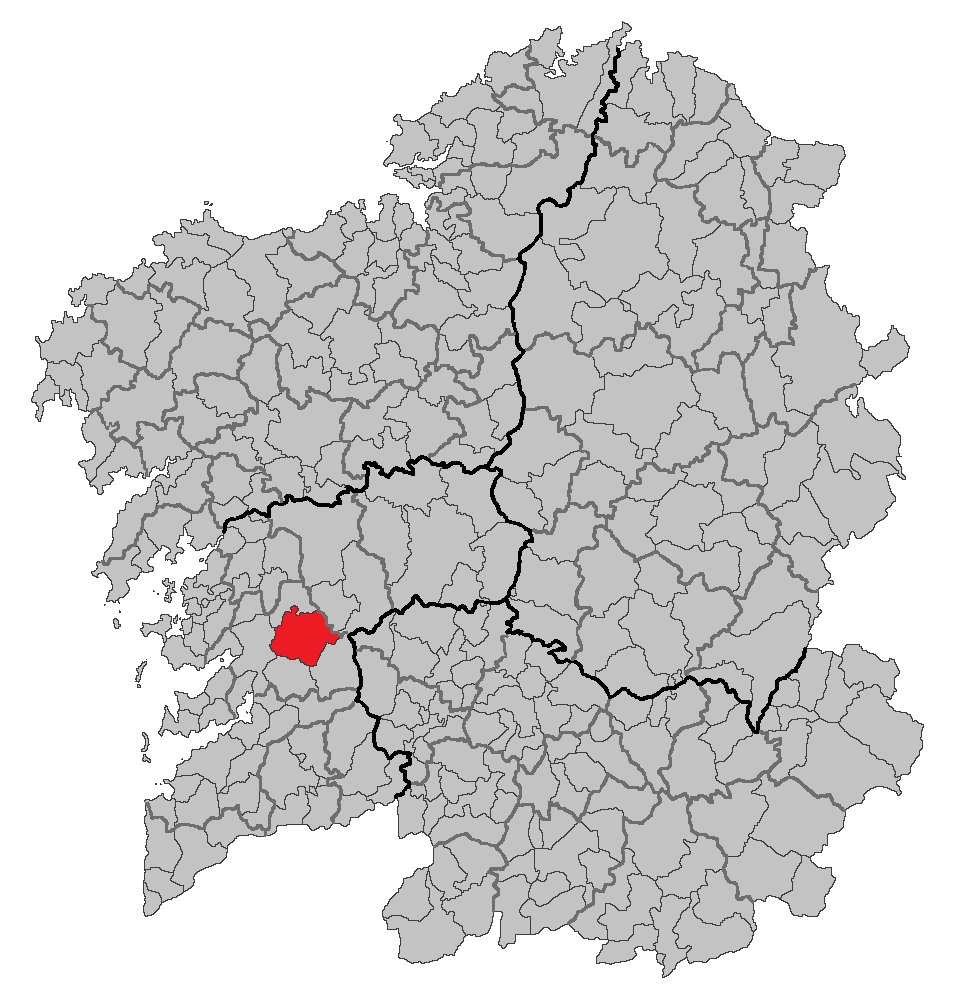
- Situation of Cotobade within Galicia
- Coordinates: 42°28′N 8°28′W
- Country: Spain
- Autonomous community: Galicia
- Province: Pontevedra

Population (2011)
  - Total: 4,432
- (INE)
- Time zone: UTC+1 (CET)
  - Summer (DST): UTC+2 (CET)

Cotobade (Spanish Cotobad) is a former local country council in Galicia (Spain) in the province of Pontevedra. It bordered the municipalities of Campo Lameiro, Cerdedo, Forcarei, A Lama, Ponte Caldelas and Pontevedra. In 2011 its population was 4432 people, according to INE.

Cotobade was divided internally into several administrative divisions that match the name of parishes. Among the most prominent geographical features are Lérez river, which flows through the lowlands of the local area and its tributary, and the river Almofrei. Among the mountains, the most prominent is Mount Seixo, one of the main mountains in Galicia.

Although the origin of the name 'Cotobade' was considered popularly to be linked to the abbot of the monastery in the vicinity ("couto de abade" meaning 'abbot's land' in Galician), it seems more likely an older link to 'coto' (summit or upper part of a mountain) and probably an old surname Vatis.

The whole region belonged to the jurisdiction of a Benedictine monastery in Tenorio.

== Geographic data ==
The council area was located west of Galicia and east of the province Pontevedra, to which it administratively belonged. In 2016 the two neighbouring council areas, Cotobade and Cerdedo, went to form a single council authority called Cerdedo-Cotobade.

== See also ==
- List of municipalities in Pontevedra
