= Cerdedo =

Concello de Cerdedo
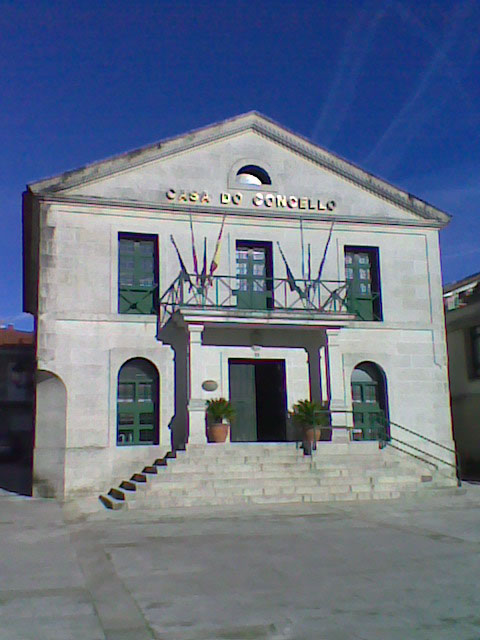

- Flag Seal

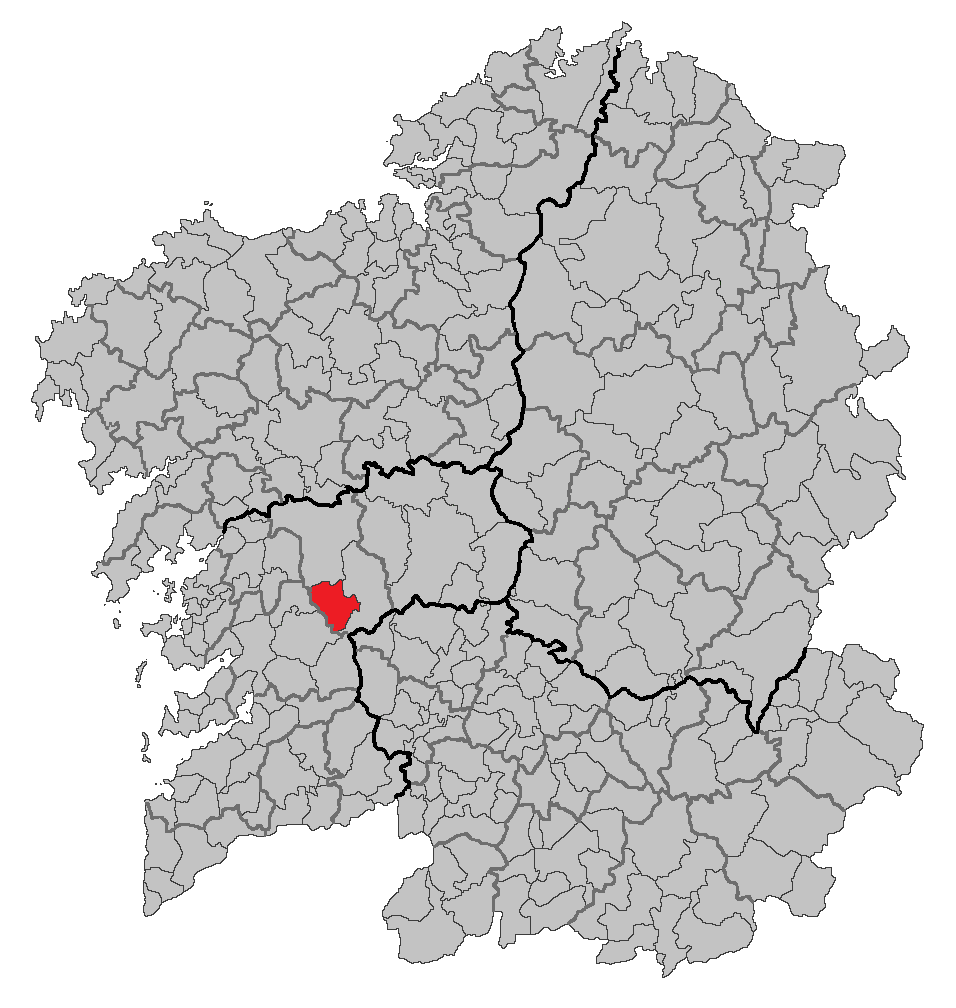
- Situation of Cerdedo within Galicia
- Coordinates: 42°32′N 8°23.5′W
- Country: Spain
- Autonomous community: Galicia
- Province: Pontevedra
- Parroquias: 8

Government
  - Alcalde (Mayor): Silvestre José Balseiros Guinarte

Area
  - Total: 79.8 km^{2} (30.8 sq mi)

Population (2012)
  - Total: 1,916
  - Density: 24.0/km^{2} (62.2/sq mi)
- (INE)
- Time zone: UTC+1 (CET)
  - Summer (DST): UTC+2 (CET)

Cerdedo is a former municipality in Galicia, Spain in the province of Pontevedra.

== Location ==
Located in the region known as Tabeirós - Terra de Montes, bordered to the north by Forcarei and A Estrada, to the west by Cotobade (with which it has since been amalgamated) and Campo Lameiro and to the east by Forcarei.

== Demography ==
Historical population

Year	Pop.	±%
1900	5,331	—
1930	5,265	−1.2%
1950	5,888	+11.8%

Year	Pop.	±%
1981	4,251	−27.8%
2012	1,916	−54.9%

Source: Article in Spanish and Galician

The population in 2012 was 1,916.

== Civil parishes ==
The municipality is composed of 8 parishes:

- Castro (Santa Baia)
- Cerdedo (San Xoán)
- Figueiroa (San Martiño)
- Folgoso (Santa María)
- Parada (San Pedro)
- Pedre (Santo Estevo)
- Quireza (San Tomé)
- Tomonde (Santa María)

== See also ==
- List of municipalities in Pontevedra
