= Tabeirós – Terra de Montes =

Coordinates: 42°36′18″N 8°24′33″W

Tabeirós - Terra de Montes
- Comarca
- Flag Coat of arms
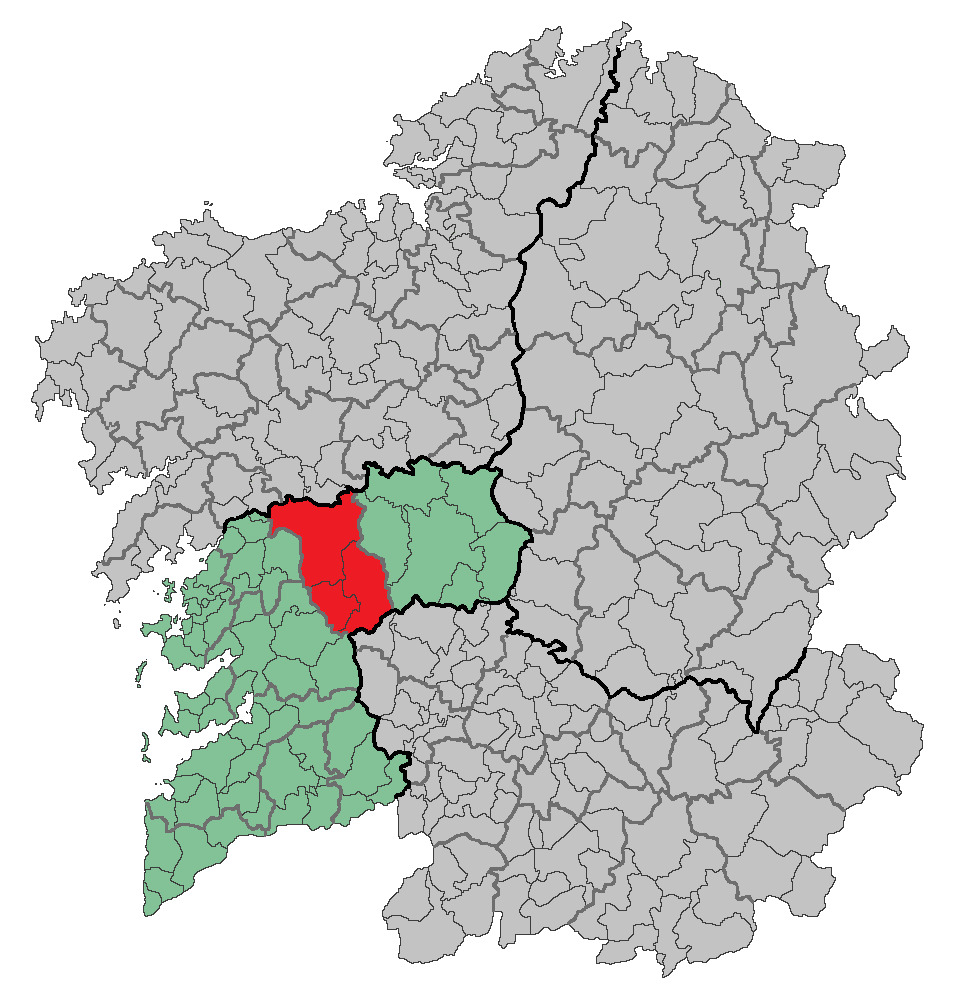
- Country: Spain
- Autonomous community: Galicia
- Province: Pontevedra
- Capital: A Estrada
- Municipalities: List: Cerdedo, A Estrada, Forcarei

Population (2019)
  - Total: 23,867
- Time zone: UTC+1 (CET)
  - Summer (DST): UTC+2 (CEST)

Tabeirós - Terra de Montes is a comarca in the Galician province of Pontevedra in Spain, located in the southern part of the basin of the river Ulla. The overall population of this local region is 23,867 (2019). It consists of two distinct natural and historical units: to the north, in the lower valley, the lands of Tabeirós corresponding approximately to the municipality of La Estrada and to the south, the mountains of Tierra de Montes, famous for their gigs and isolated monasteries.

== Municipalities ==
The region comprises the municipalities of A Estrada and Forcarei, together with part of the new municipality of Cerdedo-Cotobade, specifically the territory that formed the former municipality of Cerdedo. The county headquarters and largest urban center is the small town of A Estrada.
