= Cerdedo-Cotobade =

- Municipality
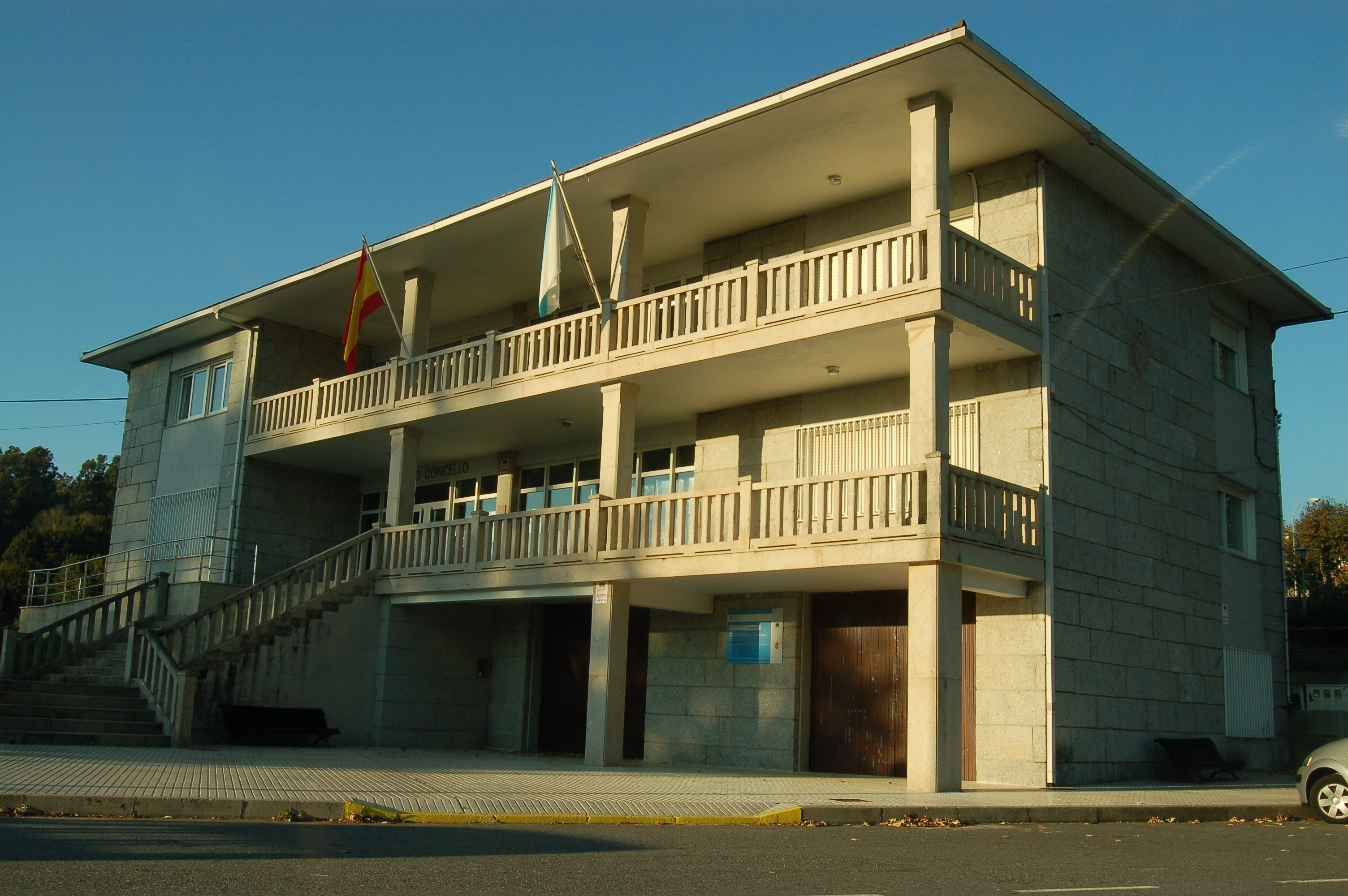

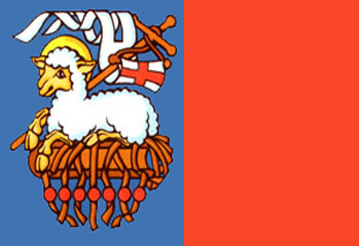
- Flag Coat of arms

- Location within Galicia Location within Spain
- Coordinates: 42°28′19″N 8°28′55″W
- Country: Spain
- Autonomous community: Galicia
- Province: Pontevedra

Area
  - Total: 214.52 km^{2} (82.83 sq mi)

Population (2025-01-01)
  - Total: 5,671
- Time zone: UTC+1 (CET)
  - Summer (DST): UTC+2 (CET)

Cerdedo-Cotobade is a municipality in the province of Pontevedra in the autonomous community of Galicia, in Spain. It arose from the merger on September 22, 2016 of Cerdedo and Cotobade municipalities.
