= Forcarei =

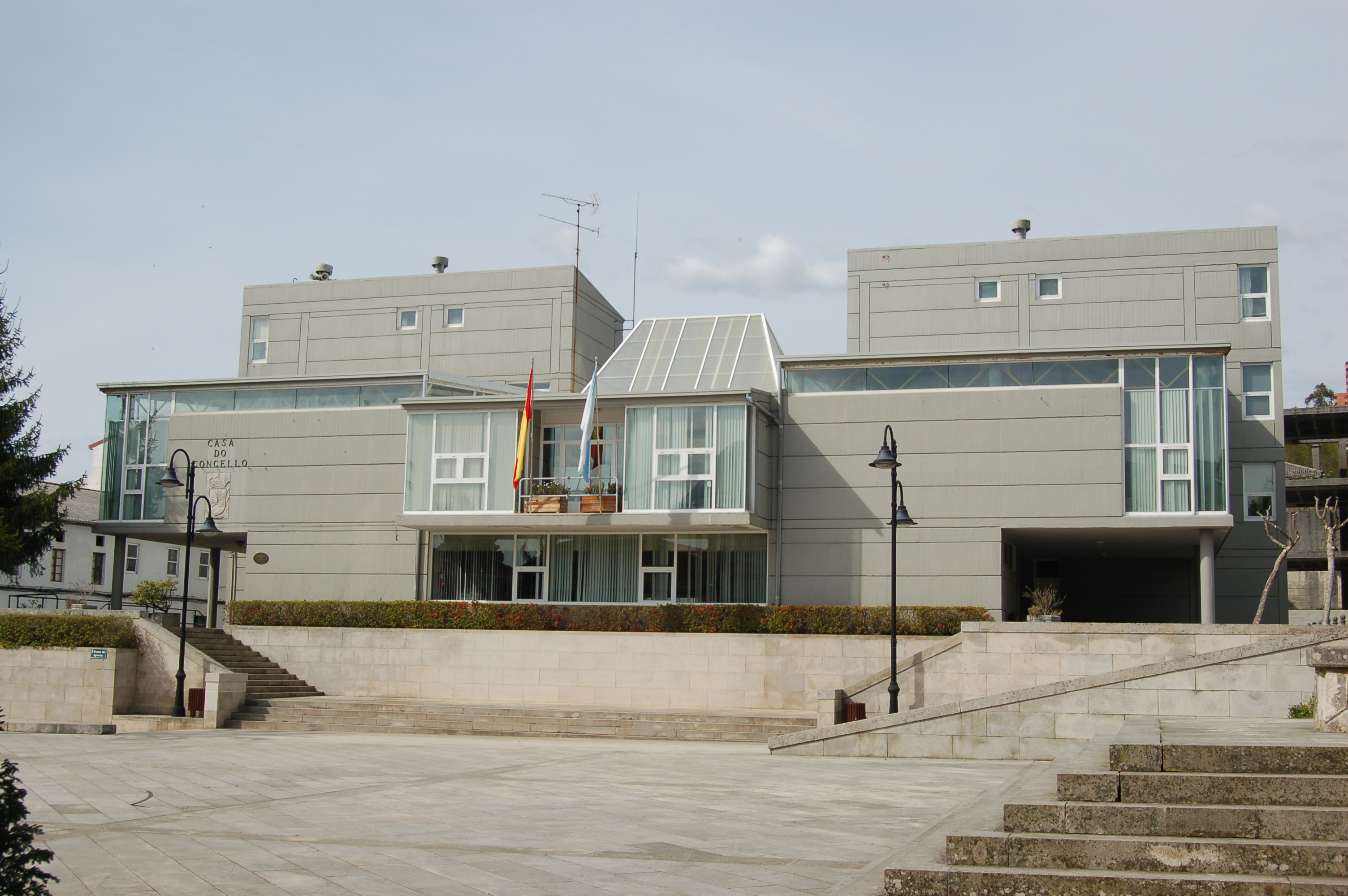
- Town hall

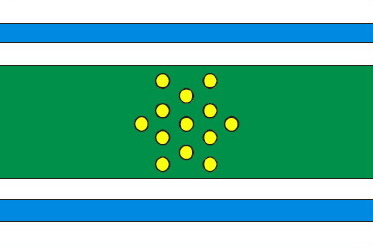
- Flag Seal

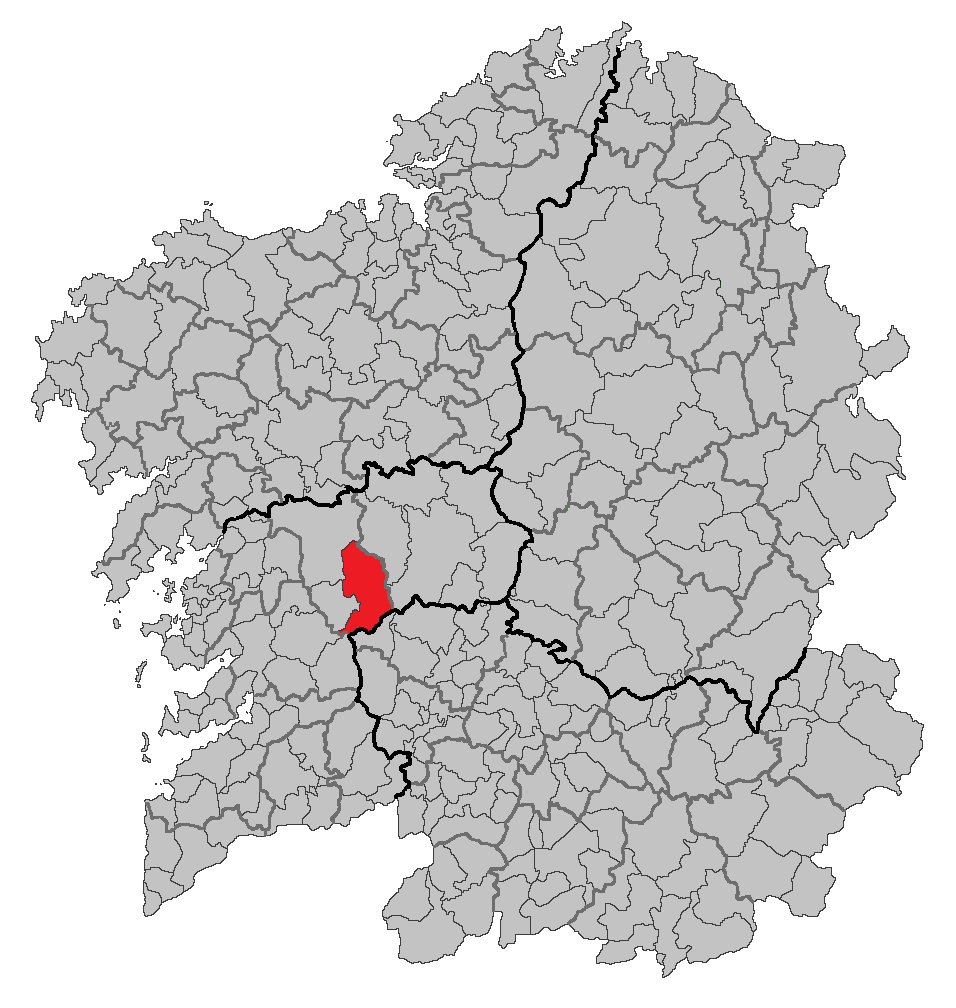
- Situation of Forcarei within Galicia
- Coordinates: 42°35′20″N 8°21′5″W
- Country: Spain
- Autonomous community: Galicia
- Province: Pontevedra
- Comarca: Tabeirós – Terra de Montes
- Parroquias: 13

Government
  - Alcalde (Mayor): Belén Cachafeiro Anta

Area
  - Total: 167.7 km^{2} (64.7 sq mi)

Population (2025-01-01)
  - Total: 3,067
  - Density: 18.29/km^{2} (47.37/sq mi)
- Time zone: UTC+1 (CET)
  - Summer (DST): UTC+2 (CET)
- Website: www.forcarei.net

Forcarei is a municipality in the province of Pontevedra, in the autonomous community of Galicia, Spain. It belongs to the comarca of Tabeirós – Terra de Montes.

== Location ==
The municipality of Forcarei occupies the northern part of the province of Pontevedra. Bordered on the east by the municipality of Lalín, which separates the mountains of O Testeiro and the Sierra de O Candán. On the north and northeast section it joins with the neighboring lands of Silleda, and the northwest to the town of La Estrada. To the southwest it borders Cerdedo and falls on the natural border of the Sierra de O Cando in the territories of Cotobade and A Lama, and in the south the Orense territories of Beariz and O Irixo.

== Demography ==
The population of Forcarei is 3,916 inhabitants. The density is 23.3 inhabitants/km^{2}.

Historical population
Year	Pop.	±%
1900	7,751	—
1930	8,987	+15.9%
1950	9,040	+0.6%
1981	7,114	−21.3%
2012	3,916	−45.0%
Source: Article in Spanish and Galician

== Civil parishes ==
The municipality is composed of 13 parishes:

- Aciveiro (Santa María)
- Castrelo (Santa Mariña)
- Dúas Igrexas (Santa María)
- Forcarei (San Martiño)
- A Madanela de Montes (Santa María Madanela)
- Meavía (San Xoán)
- Millarada (San Amedio)
- Pardesoa (Santiago)
- Pereira (San Bartolomeu)
- Quintillán (San Pedro)
- San Miguel de Presqueiras (San Miguel)
- Santa Mariña de Presqueiras (Santa Mariña)
- Ventoxo (San Nicolao)

== Services ==
In addition to government services situated by the City Council, the municipality provides municipal police, Single Window, registrar and notaries. It has a House of Culture where the Municipal School of Music is located (responsible for the municipal band) and where training courses such as computing, access to internet, Astronomical Image Analysis, management of telescopes, etc. are given and an Association of Merchants and Entrepreneurs to defend their own interests and organize cultural and educational activities.

Forcarei Astronomical Observatory is located in the municipality.

== See also ==
- List of municipalities in Pontevedra
