= A Estrada =

- Municipality
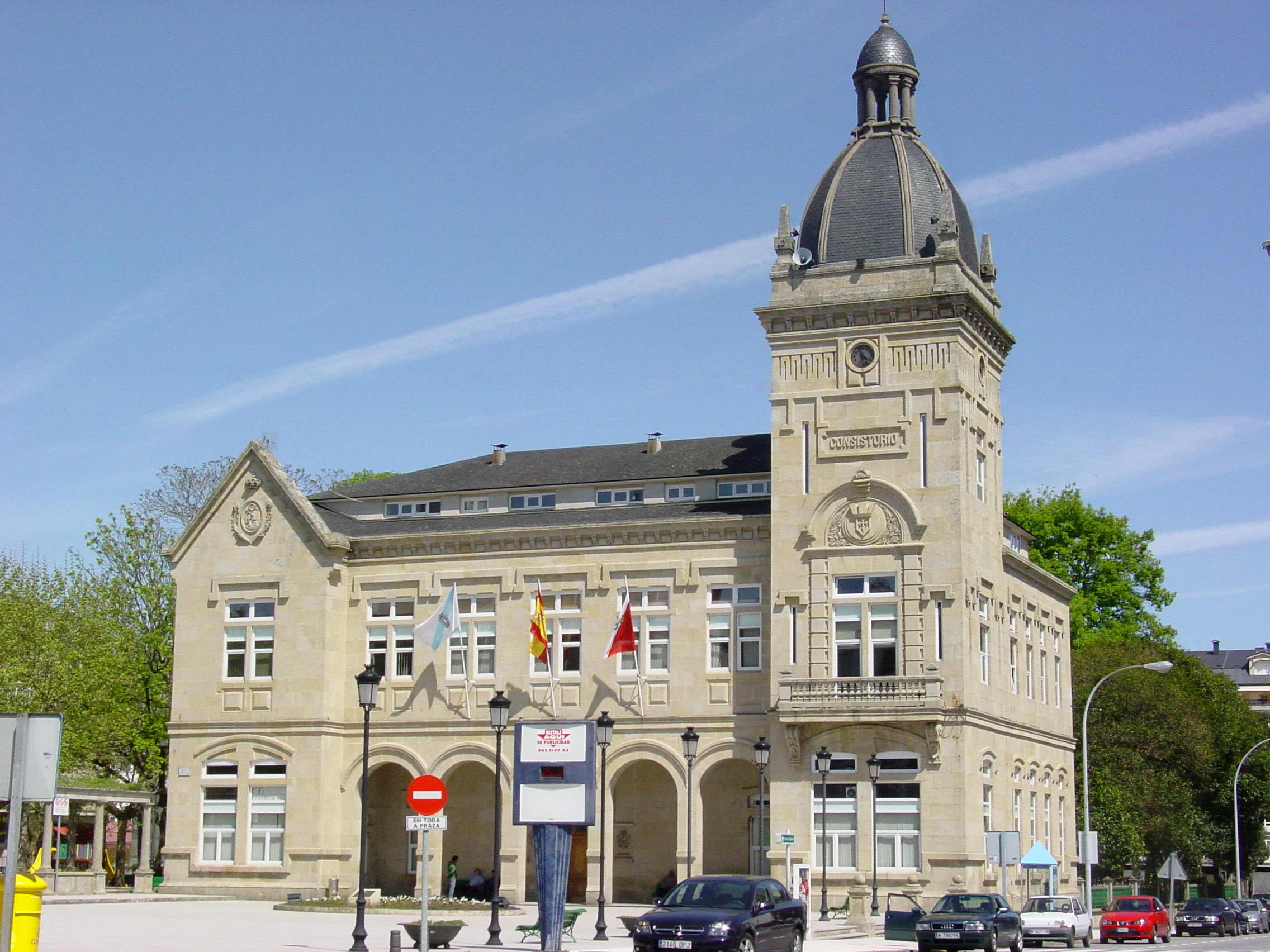

- Flag Seal

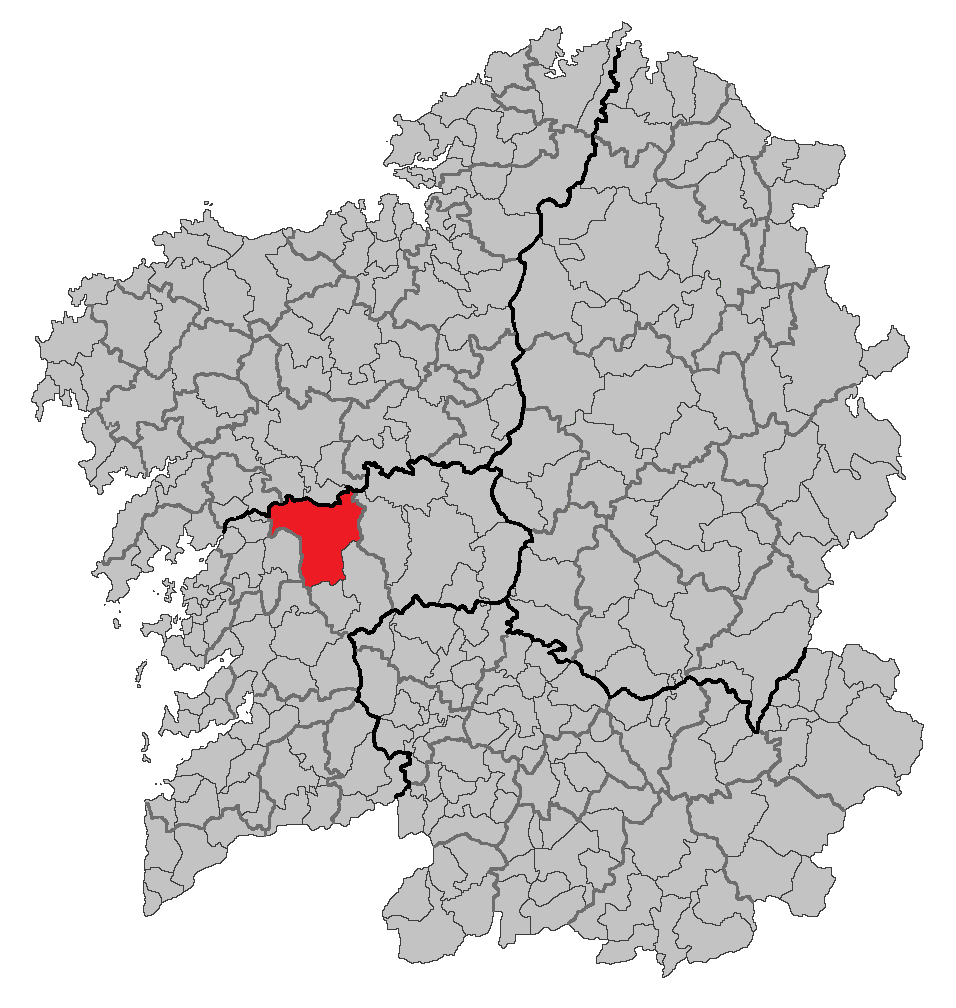
- Location of Estrada within Galicia
- Coordinates: 42°42′N 8°29′W
- Country: Spain
- Autonomous community: Galicia
- Province: Pontevedra
- Comarca: Tabeirós – Terra de Montes

Government
  - Alcalde (Mayor): Gonzalo Louzao Dono

Population (2025-01-01)
  - Total: 20,112
- Time zone: UTC+1 (CET)
  - Summer (DST): UTC+2 (CET)
- Website: www.aestrada.com

A Estrada is a municipality in the province of Pontevedra, in the autonomous community of Galicia, Spain. It belongs to the comarca of Tabeirós – Terra de Montes. It is located some 15 miles (24 km) southeast of Santiago de Compostela.

== Etymology ==
The name comes from the Latin word strata, with the meaning of trodden earth, where one walks, I walk. In fact, two paths crossed in the main square: from south to north up a path from Terra de Montes, Ourense and Portugal, where the herdsmen and pilgrims going to Santiago de Compostela passed; and east to west, from the lands of Deza, Trasdeza and the interior of Galicia, where herdsmen headed to the coast.

== History ==
Tabeirós jurisdiction stems from the days of the Swabian King Miro in the sixth century and is mentioned in the Chronicon Iriense as belonging to the diocese of Iria. In the twelfth century, the archbishop of Santiago Gelmírez and King Alfonso VII of Castile exchanged land between Tabeirós, Tabeirolos and the Faro fort, passing the first into the possession of the Compostela miter. This jurisdiction covered the whole current City of A Estrada, except for the parishes of Vea, until 1840. This is the year in which the City Council and the judicial district of A Estrada were created (now the capital of the judicial district comprises the municipalities of A Estrada, Forcarei and Cerdedo).

Three years earlier, because of the clashes between absolutists and liberals, the town hall of Tabeirós moved from Cereixo to the site of A Estrada, formed by four houses at a crossroads between the parishes of Figueroa, Ouzande and Guimarei.

In the early 20th century, the town was described as follows:

[A Estrada] is the chief town of a densely populated mountainous district; its industries are agriculture, stockbreeding, and the manufacture of linen and woollen cloth. Timber from the mountain forests is conveyed from Estrada to the Ulla River, 4 miles north, and thence floated down to the sea ports on Arousa Bay. There are mineral springs at A Estrada and at Caldas de Reis, 11 miles west-southwest.

== See also ==
- List of municipalities in Pontevedra
