= Campo Lameiro =

- municipality
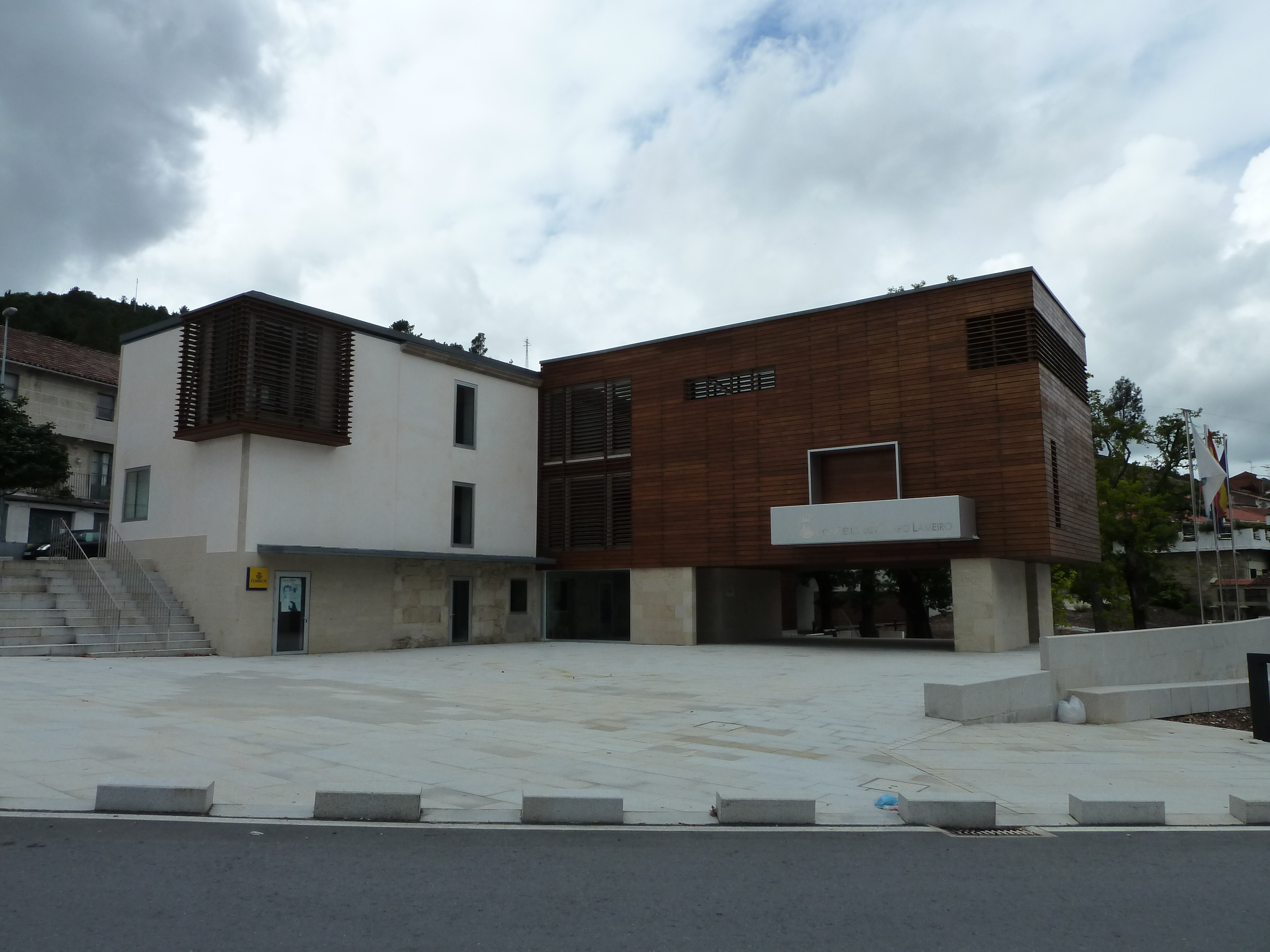

- Coat of arms

- Location in Spain
- Coordinates: 42°32′32″N 8°32′34″W
- Country: Spain
- Autonomous community: Galicia
- Province: Pontevedra
- Comarca: Pontevedra

Government
  - Mayor: Julio G Sayáns Bugallo

Area
  - Total: 63.82 km^{2} (24.64 sq mi)

Population (2025-01-01)
  - Total: 1,667
  - Density: 26.12/km^{2} (67.65/sq mi)
- Time zone: UTC+1 (CET)
  - Summer (DST): UTC+2 (CET)

Campo Lameiro is a municipality in Galicia, Spain in the province of Pontevedra. Campo Lameiro is the Galician capital of rock art, with a large collection of petroglyphs located in the Archaeological Park of Campo Lameiro.

== Location ==
The capital is A Lagoa, an entity belonging to the parish of Campo, which is 20 kilometers from the Pontevedra capital.

== Parishes ==
The municipality is composed of 6 parishes comprising the following towns:

- Parish of O Campo (San Miguel): A Lagoa, Campo Lameiro, Chacente, Morañó, Praderei and Alende.
- Parish of O Couso (San Cristovo): Rozas, Castriño, Liñares, Fafide, Padín, Cimadevila and Castro de Orto.
- Parish of Fragas (Santa Mariña): Laxe, Reboredo, As Cruces, Cerdeiras, Fontenla, Mullerboa, Redonde and Gargallóns.
- Parish of Moimenta (Santa María): Moimenta, Lamosa, Painceiros, Paredes, Armonda and A Brea.
- Parish of Montes (San Isidro): Parada and Fornelos.

== Festivals ==
- Festival of San Isidro Labrador (May 15)
- Festival of Aguardiente (June)
- Festival of San Antonio (June 13)
- Festival of San Miguel (September 29)

== See also ==
- List of municipalities in Pontevedra
