= Rivers of Galicia =

The rivers of Galicia form part of a dense hydrographical network in the Spanish autonomous community of Galicia and has been described by Otero Pedrayo as “the land of a thousand rivers”. Most rivers are not deep enough to be navigable. However, small boats are sailed in the lower courses of the River Minho and several others, as well as at many of the dams.

The rivers flowing into the Bay of Biscay (Cantabrian Sea) tend to be very short. Those flowing into the Atlantic Ocean are only a little longer, except for the Minho (340 km) and the Sil (225 km), whose lengths are several hundred kilometres. There are numerous rapids, due to the steep gradients of many river courses.

In addition to river fishing, rivers have been used to power mills, and dams have been constructed to provide hydroelectric power and water storage.

== Alphabetical list of Galician rivers ==
=== A ===
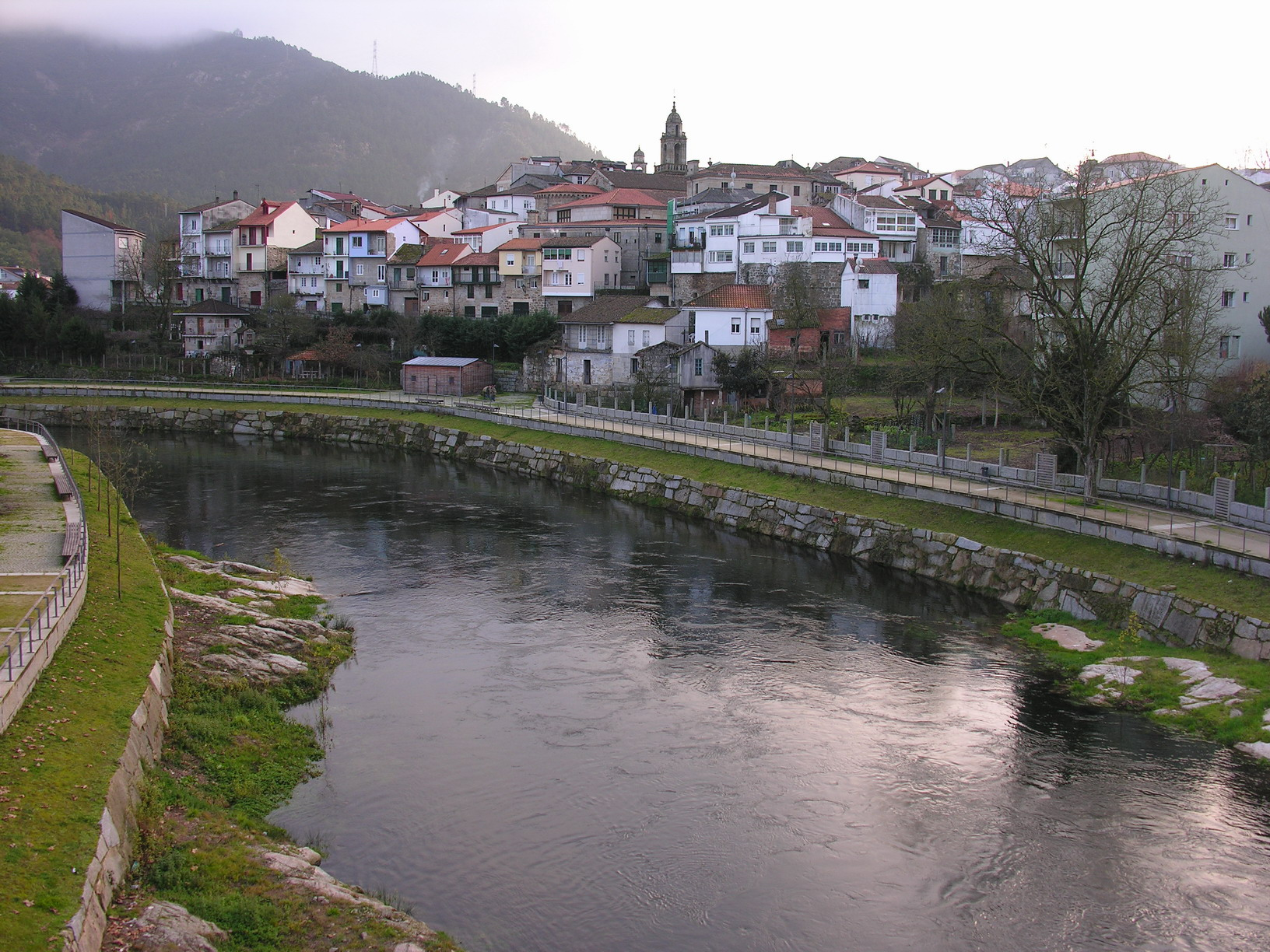
The Avia at Ribadavia

Name	Source	Outlet	Flows through	Province
Abadín	Fraiás, Abadín	Anllo	Triabá, Castro de Rei	Lugo
Abaixo		Anllóns		A Coruña
Ábedes	Osoño, Vilardevós	Támega	Vilardevós. Verín, Oímbra	Ourense
Abelenda				A Coruña
Abellas				Pontevedra
Abuín		Xallas		A Coruña
Rego Acevedo, río Picarrexo		Picarrexo		Lugo
Rego Acevedo, río Cabe	Óutara, A Pobra do Brollón	Cabe		Lugo
Acheiro		Anllóns		A Coruña
Agro				Ourense
Albariña				A Coruña
Alemparte		Arnego		Pontevedra
Alén		Tea		Pontevedra
Regato de Alende		Umia		Pontevedra
Almofrei	Caroi, Cotobade	Lérez		Pontevedra
Ambía		Arnoia		Ourense
Ameneiro		Parga		Lugo
Ancha		Xallas		A Coruña
Anduriña	Serra de Queixeiro	Baxoi	Monfero, Vilarmaior	A Coruña
Regato Anduriñas		Antigua		Lugo
Anllo	Gontán, Abadín	Minho	Abadín, Cospeito, Castro de Rei	Lugo
Anllóns	Montes de Xalo	Ría de Corme e Laxe	Ponteceso, Carballo	A Coruña
Antigua	Trascastro, O Incio	Cabe	O Incio	Lugo
Rego de Antiguidá		dos Gafos		Pontevedra
de Arante		Grande		Lugo
Arcos		Xallas		A Coruña
Rego de Ardelio		Picarrexo		Lugo
Arenteiro	Pena de Francia, Serra do Faro	Avia	O Carballiño, Pazos de Arenteiro	Ourense
Areoso				
Arlés		Atlantic Ocean		A Coruña
Arnego	Pena de Francia, Serra do Faro	Ulla	Brocos, Agolada	Pontevedra
Arnoia	Vilar de Barrio	Minho	Vilar de Barrio, Baños de Molgas, Xunqueira de Ambía, Allariz, A Merca, Celanova, Ramirás, Gomesende, Cartelle, A Arnoia	Ourense
Arteixo				A Coruña
Arzoá	Comarca de Verín	Mente	A Silva, Riós	Ourense
Asma		Minho	Chantada	Lugo
Asneiro	Dozón	Deza	Cristimil, Lalín	Pontevedra
Avia	Serra do Suído, Nieva, Avión	Minho	Leiro, Boborás, Avión, Ribadavia	Ourense
Azúmara	Serra do Mirador, Montecubeiro, Castroverde	Minho	Castroverde, Pol, Castro de Rei	Lugo

=== B ===
Name	Source	Outlet	Flows through	Province
Bandeira		Anllóns		A Coruña
das Balsadas				Lugo
Barbantiño	Vilamarín	Minho	San Cristovo de Cea, Maside, Punxín	Ourense
Barbanza	Serra da Barbanza, Boiro	Atlantic Ocean	Pobra do Caramiñal	A Coruña
Barbaña	Figueiroá, Paderne de Allariz	Minho	Paderne de Allariz, Taboadela, San Cibrao das Viñas, Ourense	Ourense
Barbeira		Xallas		A Coruña
Barbeira		Verdugo		Pontevedra
Barcés		Mero		A Coruña
Barcala		Tambre		A Coruña
do Barco		dos Gafos		Pontevedra
Barragán		Oitavén		Pontevedra
Rego de Barrantes	Monforte de Lemos	Cinsa		Lugo
Regueiro do Barreiro		Soldón		Lugo
Barreiros				Lugo
Batán		Anllóns		A Coruña
Rego do Batán		Masma		Lugo
Regato do Batán		Te		A Coruña
Baxoi	Serra de Queixeiro	Ría de Betanzos	Monfero, Vilarmaior, Miño	A Coruña
Bazar		Xallas		A Coruña
Beba		Xallas		A Coruña
Belelle	Monte Fontardión	Ría de Ferrol	A Capela, Cabanas, Fene, Neda	A Coruña
Beloi				Lugo
Beluso	Monte Muralla, Lousame	Ría de Arousa	Lousame, Boiro	A Coruña
Bermaña		Umia	Caldas de Reis	Pontevedra
Bertón		Anllóns		A Coruña
Bexa		Te		A Coruña
Bibei	Pico do Moncalvo, Zamora	Sil	Porto, Viana do Bolo, O Bolo, Manzaneda, A Pobra de Trives, Ribas de Sil, Quiroga	Ourense
Blanqueño		Parga		Lugo
Boedo		Parga		Lugo
de Bois		dos Gafos		Pontevedra
Bolaños	Lagostelle, Guitiriz	Parga	Guitiriz	A Coruña
Rego da Bordeseca		Calvar		A Coruña
Rego de Borela		Almofrei		Pontevedra
Bouzas		Anllóns		A Coruña
Brandeso		Iso		A Coruña
Brantega		Arnego		Pontevedra
Brea				A Coruña
Brexa		Mero		A Coruña
Brandelos		Ulla	Touro	A Coruña
Búbal or Buble	Serra do Larouco, Cualedro	Támega	Cualedro, Monterrei	Ourense
Búbal		Minho		Lugo

=== C ===
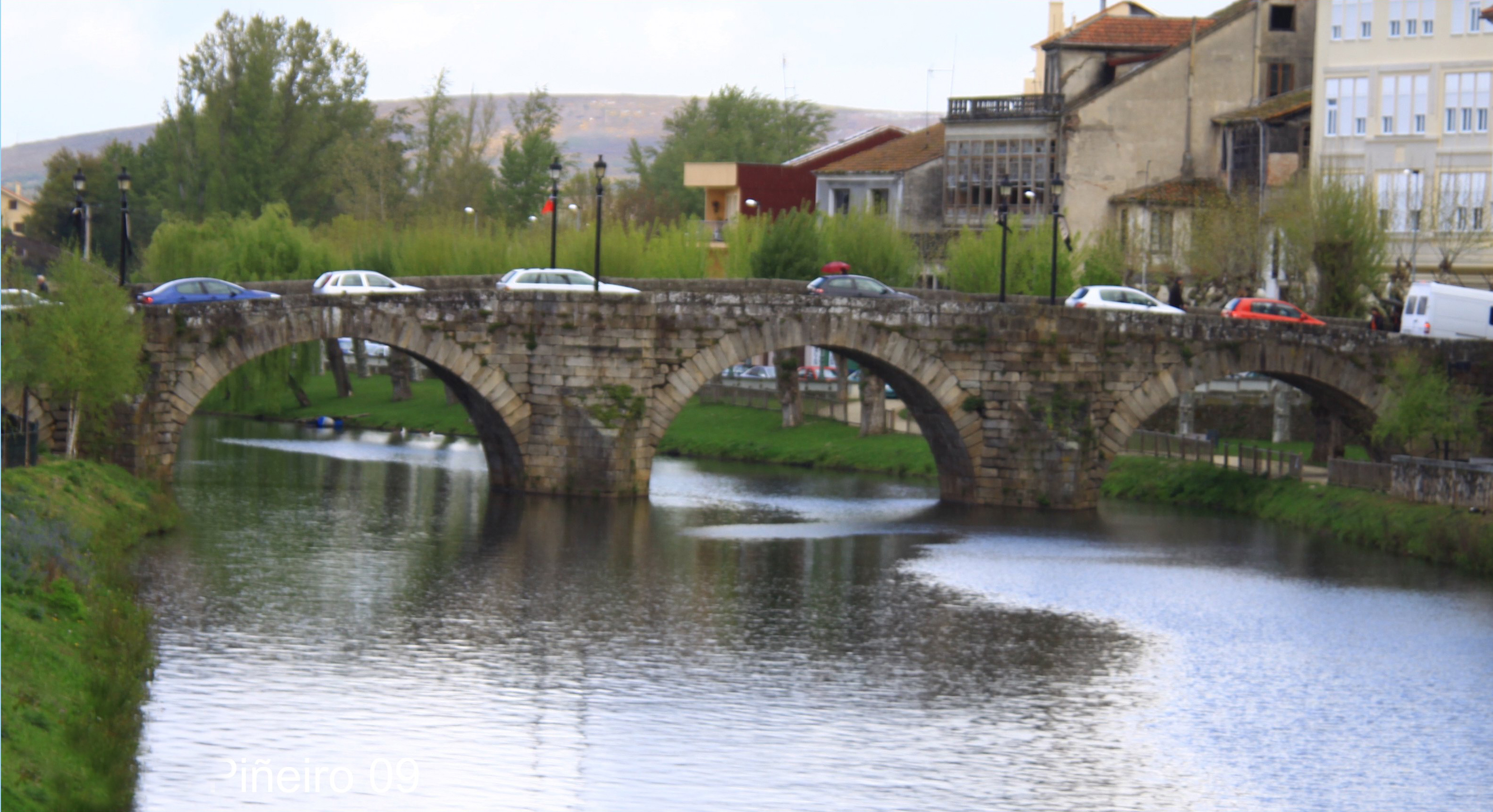
The Cabe at Monforte de Lemos

Name	Source	Outlet	Flows through	Province
Cabalar		Tambre	Boimorto	A Coruña
Cabalar		Bibei	A Pobra de Trives	Ourense
Cabaleiro				Ourense
Cabanas				Ourense
Cabe	Foilebar, O Incio	Sil	O Incio, A Pobra do Brollón, Monforte de Lemos, Pantón, Sober, Galicia	Lugo
Cadós				Ourense
Cadrón		Arnego		Pontevedra
Regueiro das Calas		Soldón		Lugo
Calvar	Coristanco	Anllóns	Coristanco	A Coruña
Calvelle		Verdugo		Pontevedra
Camba	Serra de San Mamede, Laza	Bibei	Laza, Castrelo do Val, Vilariño de Conso, Viana do Bolo	Ourense
Cambás				A Coruña
Cancelada	Serra de Espancares	Navia		Lugo
Cangas	Moncide	Bay of Biscay		Lugo
Canteira	Fontaneira	Eume (river)		A Coruña
Carabelos	Sober	Cabe		Ourense
Carballal				A Coruña
Rego da Carballeda		Mao		Lugo
Barranco de Carballo	Distriz, Monforte de Lemos	Cabe		Lugo
Cardelle				Ourense
Carral				A Coruña
Regato Carral		Parga		Lugo
Carrozo de Carroceiro		Soldón		Lugo
Casal				Ourense
Regato de Casal		Roca		Lugo
Casas do Río				Lugo
Caselas	Monte Corucho, Salceda de Caselas	Minho	Salceda de Caselas, Salvaterra de Miño, Tui	Pontevedra
Casoio	Casoio, Carballeda de Valdeorras	Sil	Carballeda de Valdeorras	Ourense
Castiñeira		Xallas		A Coruña
Castro	Monte Escaleira, Vimianzo	Ría de Lires	Muxía, Dumbría, Cee	A Coruña
Castro		Xubia		A Coruña
Rego de Catasol		Furelos		A Coruña
Regato das Catro Corredoiras		San Lázaro		Ourense
Caudelo				A Coruña
Cea		Minho		Pontevedra
Cedeira				
Celeiro	Vilar, Sarria	Sarria	Sarria	Lugo
Cenza	Manzaneda	Conso	Manzaneda, Vilariño de Conso	Ourense
Regato de Cereixedo		Mao		Lugo
Cereixo da Briña		Minho		Pontevedra
Cerves				Ourense
Cesuras		Valiñadares		Lugo
Chamoso		Minho		Lugo
Rego de Chan das Latas		Almofrei		Pontevedra
Regato de Chaos de Pías		Antigua		Lugo
Cinsa		Cabe		Lugo
Colín	Coto da Frouseira	Ría de Foz		Lugo
do Con	Monte Xiabre	Ría de Arousa	Vilagarcía de Arousa	Pontevedra
Condomiños				A Coruña
Conso		Bibei		
Rego da Córnea	Óutara, A Pobra do Brollón	Cabe		Lugo
Corgo	O Meixonfrío	Sarela	Santiago de Compostela	A Coruña
Corzán				A Coruña
de Corzos		Xares		Ourense
Couce				
Covas				Lugo
de Covés	Covés	Eume	Pontedeume	A Coruña
Cruzal	Monte da Albela, Becerreá	Navia		Lugo
Regato de Cubeiros		San Lázafro		Ourense
Curantes				Pontevedra
Curgueiro		Arnego		Pontevedra
Rego dos Curros		Eume		A Coruña

=== D ===
Name	Source	Outlet	Flows through	Province
Deo		Mandeo		A Coruña
Deva	Teso de Deva	Minho	Comarca da Paradanta	Pontevedra
Deva	Serra do Leboreiro, Bangueses, Verea	Minho	Verea, Pontedeva, Cortegada	Ourense
Deva Grande				Ourense
Regato da Devesa		Te		A Coruña
Deza	Soutelo de Montes, Forcarei; Zobra, Lalín	Ulla		Pontevedra
Dornas		Xallas		A Coruña
Dubra	Montes do Castelo, Anxeriz, Tordoia	Tambre	Portomouro, Val do Dubra	A Coruña

=== E ===
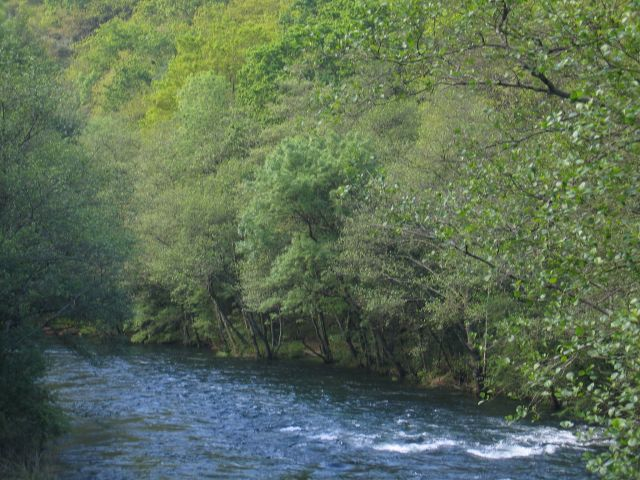
The Eume flows through woodland

Name	Source	Outlet	Flows through	Province
Edo				Ourense
Eifonso	Beade, Vigo	Lagares	Vigo	Pontevedra
Regato da Encidiña		San Lázaro		Ourense
Enviande				Lugo
Eo	Fonteo, Baleira	Ría de Ribadeo	A Pontenova, Santiso de Abres, Abres	
Rego de Erviñou				A Coruña
Escadebas		Boedo		Lugo
Escouridal	Penedo do Galo	Landrove		Lugo
Esmelle				A Coruña
Esteleiro				Lugo
Esternande		Xallas		A Coruña
Eume	Serra do Xistral, A Balsa, Muras	Ría de Ares	Abadín, Muras, Vilalba, Xermade, As Pontes, A Capela, Monfero, Cabanas, Pontedeume	A Coruña

=== F ===
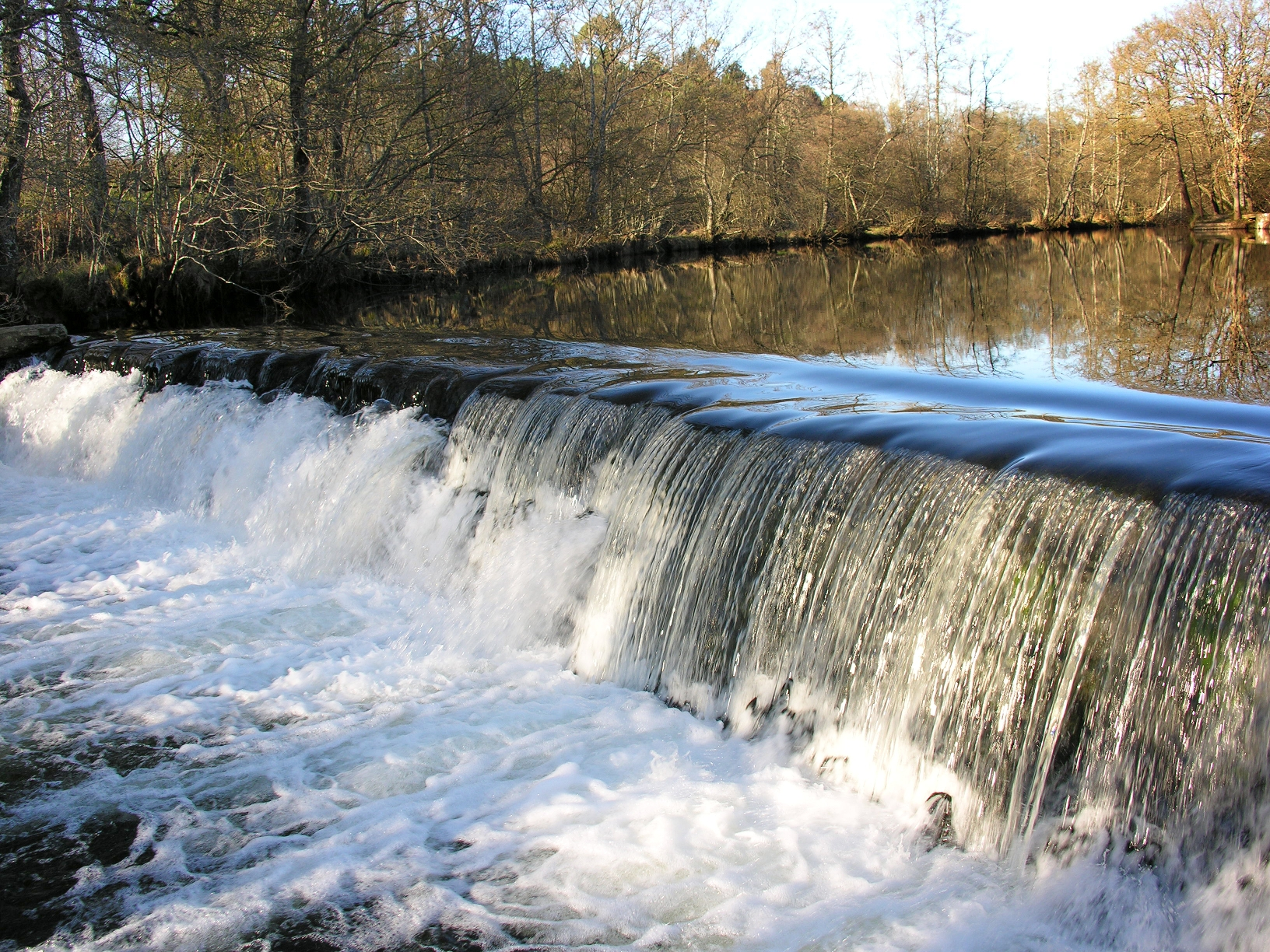
The Furelos, weir at Melide

Name	Source	Outlet	Flows through	Province
Fabilos		Ladra		Lugo
Regato da Fábrica		Parga		Lugo
Faramontaos	Serra do Larouco	Limia	Faramontaos, Trasmiras, Xinzo de Limia	Ourense
Fareix				Ourense
Fecha				Ourense
Ferreira	Serra do Careón, Palas de Rei	Minho	Palas de Rei, Guntín, Portomarín	Lugo
Ferreira	O Incio	Cabe	A Pobra do Brollón, Monforte de Lemos, Pantón, Sober, Galicia	Lugo
Carrozo da Fervencia		Soldón		Lugo
Figueiras		Masma		Lugo
Regato de Filloi		Umia		Pontevedra
Firvida				Ourense
Fiscaíño		Bibei	A Pobra de Trives	Ourense
Florida		Boedo		Lugo
Regato Floxo		Te		A Coruña
Folón			O Rosal	Pontevedra
Fondos				Lugo
Regato da Fonte Fría		San Lázaro		Ourense
Forcadas				A Coruña
Rego das Forcadas		Picarrexo		Lugo
dos Forcados	Labacengos, Ferrol	Ría de Cedeira		A Coruña
da Fraga		Ría de Vigo		Pontevedra
Rego da Fraga		Pequeno		Lugo
Regato Fraga		Parga		Lugo
Fragoso				Ourense
Frai Bermuz	Serra da Loba	Eume	Monfero	A Coruña
Freixeiro	Montes da Lagoa, Trasancos, Narón	Ría de Ferrol	Narón, Ferrol	A Coruña
Furelos		Ulla	Comarca da Terra de Melide	
Furnia		Miñho		Pontevedra

=== G ===
Name	Source	Outlet	Flows through	Province
Gadanha		Miñho		Ourense
dos Gafos	Mato da Xestiña, Figueirido, Vilaboa	Vilaboa, Pontevedra	Pontevedra	
Gallo		Umia		Pontevedra
Gándara		Anllóns		A Coruña
Gándara		Mero		A Coruña
García		Xallas		A Coruña
da Gouxa	Siador, Silleda	Deza	Siador, Silleda, Silleda, Silleda, Ponte	Pontevedra
Govia				A Coruña
Grande	A Fórnea, Trabada	Ría de Ribadeo	Trabada, Barreiros, Ribadeo	Lugo
Grande			Comarca da Barbanza	A Coruña
Grande		Ría de Camariñas	Comarca de Bergantiños	A Coruña
Grande		Navea		Ourense
Grande de Xuvia	Montes da Serra, Somozas	Ría de Ferrol	Somozas, Narón, Neda	A Coruña
Graña		Anllóns		A Coruña
Regato de Grela		Umia		Pontevedra
Grelo		Calvar		A Coruña
da Groba		Ría de Vigo		Pontevedra
Guisande		Támoga		Lugo
Guisande		Xallas		A Coruña

=== H ===
Name	Source	Outlet	Flows through	Province
de Hedrada	Covas, Montederramo	Mao	Maceda, Montederramo	Ourense

=== I ===
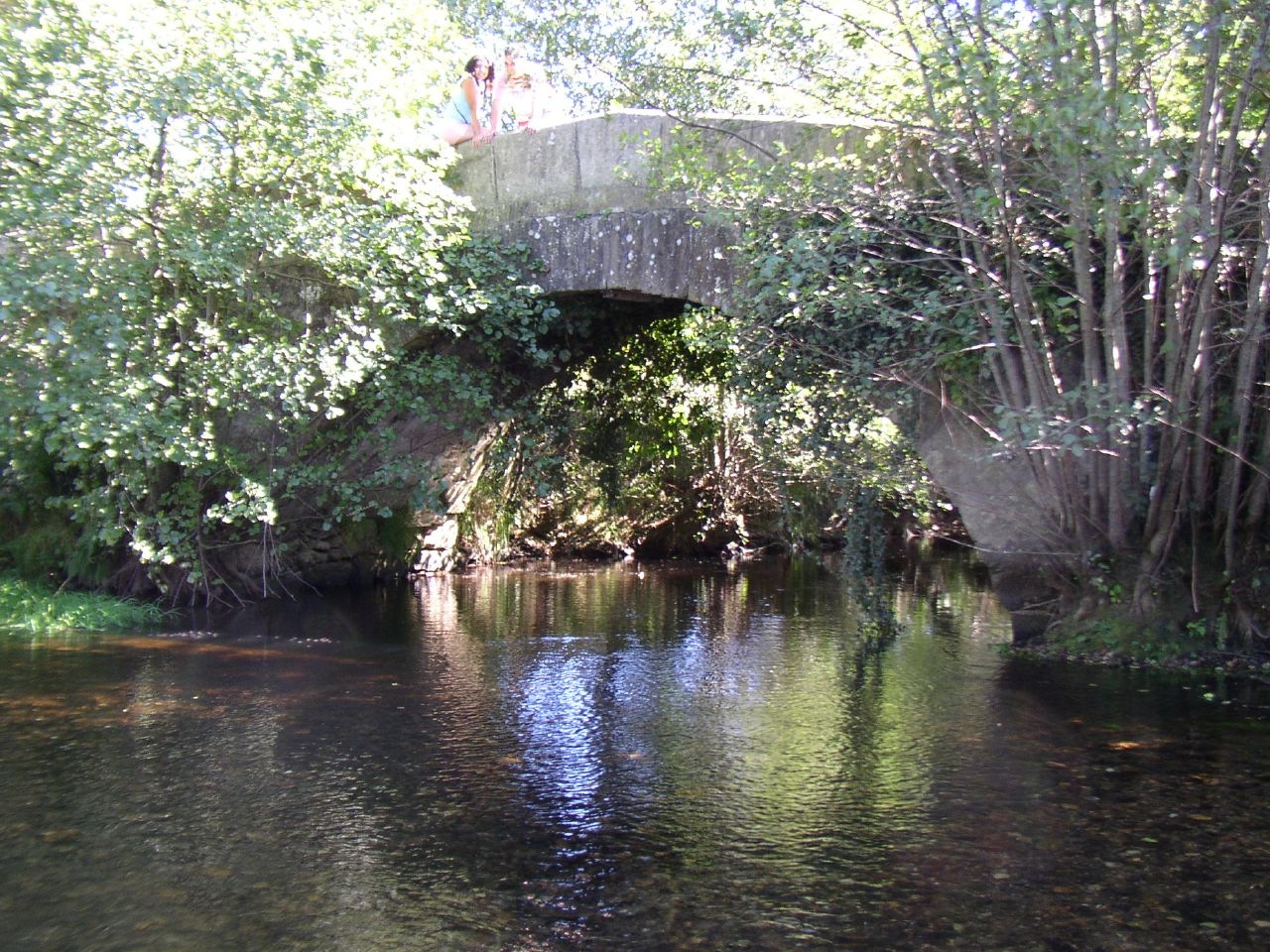
Iso, bridge at Ribadiso da Baixo.

Name	Source	Outlet	Flows through	Province
Ibias	Asturias	Navia		Lugo
Regato Illo		Roca		Lugo
Caborco do Inferno		Soldón		Lugo
Iso		Ulla	Boimorto, Arzúa	A Coruña

=== L ===
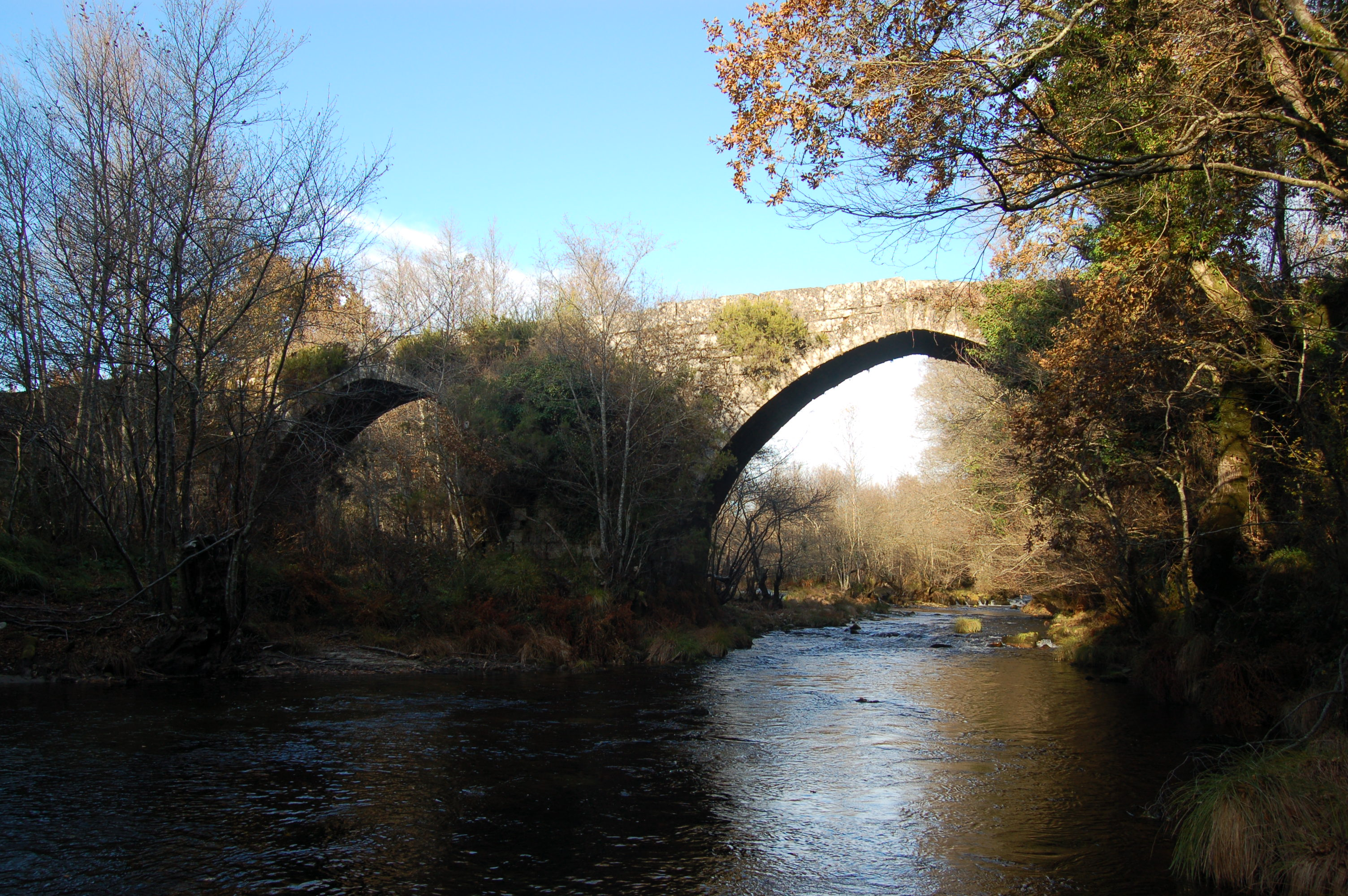
The Lérez, Roman bridge at Pedre, Cerdedo

Name	Source	Outlet	Flows through	Province
Labrada		Abadín		Lugo
Labrada		Ladra		Lugo
Labrador				Lugo
Ladra		Minho	Terra Chá	Lugo
Lagares	Vigo	Ría de Vigo	Vigo	Pontevedra
Lambre	Monte da Pena da Uz, Monfero	Ría de Betanzos	Monfero, Vilarmaior, Irixoa, Miño, Paderne	A Coruña
Lambruxo		Lambre		A Coruña
Lameira	Marín	Ría de Pontevedra	Marín	Pontevedra
Carrozo das Lameiras		Soldón		Lugo
Regato Lameiro		Antigua		Lugo
Regato Landoeiras		Boedo		Lugo
Landro ou Landrove	O Viveiró, Muras	Ría de Viveiro	Muras, Viveiro, Ourol	Lugo
Landroil		Parga		Lugo
Regato de Langullo		San Lázaro		Ourense
Lavadoiro		Ferreira		Lugo
Lavandeira		Parga		Lugo
Lea	Pol	Minho	Pol	Lugo
Lebrón		Saa		Lugo
Leira	Monte Montouto, Vilamartín de Valdeorras	Sil	Vilamartín de Valdeorras	Ourense
Lengüelle	Monte dos Curros, Tordoia	Tambre	Tordoia, Trazo, Oroso	A Coruña
Regato Lentemil		Boedo		Lugo
Lérez	Serra do Candán, Aciveiro, Forcarei	Ría de Pontevedra	Forcarei, Cerdedo, Campo Lameiro, Cotobade, Pontevedra	Pontevedra
Lérez		Barbanza		A Coruña
Lexoso		Grande		Lugo
Limia		Atlantic Ocean	Xinzo de Limia, Ponte de Lima, Viana do Castelo	Ourense e Portugal
Liñares				Pontevedra
Liñeiras		Eo		Lugo
Loba				A Coruña
Lodeiro		Dubra		A Coruña
Loio		Minho		Lugo
Loira		Atlantic Ocean		A Coruña
Lonia	Loña do Monte, Nogueira de Ramuín	Minho	Nogueira de Ramuín, Pereiro de Aguiar, Ourense	Ourense
Lor	Pedrafita do Cebreiro	Sil	Pedrafita do Cebreiro, Quiroga	Lugo
Lourenzá	Serra de Lourenzá	Masma		Lugo
Lourido		Anllóns		A Coruña
Louro	Pazos de Borbén	Minho	Pazos de Borbén, Mos, Redondela, O Porriño, Tui	Pontevedra
Lóuzara				Lugo

=== M ===
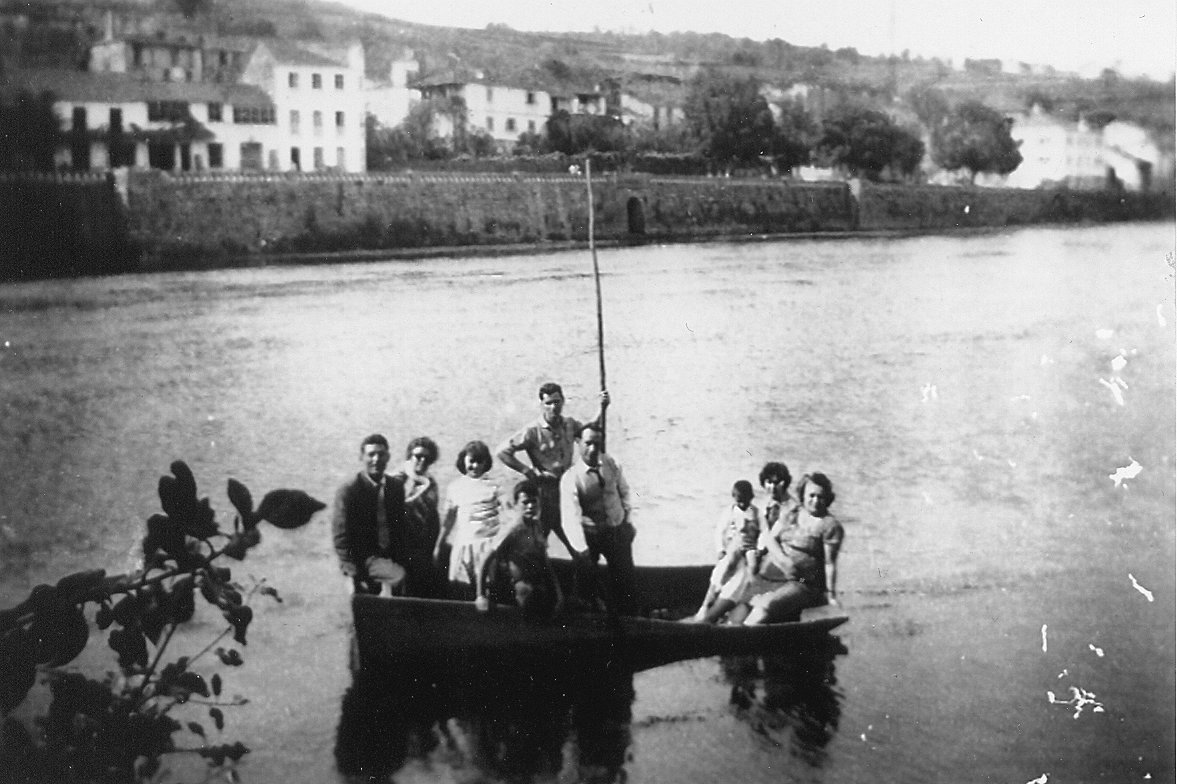
The Minho, Portomarín in the 1920s

Name	Source	Outlet	Flows through	Province
Maceda	Cabeza de Meda	Arnoia	Maceda	Ourense
Madanela		Ladra	Vilalba	Lugo
Magros				Ourense
Mainzoso				A Coruña
Regato da Mallada de Barbeirón		San Lázaro		Ourense
Mandeo			Sobrado, Curtis, Aranga, Irixoa, Coirós, Paderne, Betanzos	A Coruña
Mao	O Mao, O Incio	Cabe	O Incio, Bóveda, Monforte de Lemos	Lugo
Mao	Serra de San Mamede	Sil		Ourense
Mao	Muíños	Salas		Ourense
Marcelín	Vilardevós	Arzoá		Ourense
Mariaqueira				A Coruña
Mariz		Boedo		Lugo
Maroña		Xallas		A Coruña
Martín	Fonsagrada	Eo		Lugo
Masma	Serra do Xistral, O Valadouro	Ría de Foz	Abadín, Alfoz, Mondoñedo, Lourenzá, Barreiros, Foz	Lugo
Mazaricos		Xallas		A Coruña
Medo		Parga		Lugo
Mendo	Curtis	Ría de Betanzos	Curtis, Oza-Cesuras, Coirós, Betanzos	A Coruña
Mente	Serra de Texeiras	Rabazal		Ourense
Mera	Alto do Caxado, Serra da Faladoira	Ría de Ortigueira	Somozas, Ortigueira, Cerdido, As Pontes de García Rodríguez	
Mera	Calvos de Sobrecamiño, Arzúa	Tambre	Arzúa, O Pino	A Coruña
Mera	Santalla de Bóveda de Mera, Lugo	Minho	Lugo	Lugo
Mera	Bacurín, Lugo	Mera		
Mero	Montes da Tieira	Ría do Burgo	Oza-Cesuras, Abegondo, Bergondo, Cambre, Culleredo, Oleiros	A Coruña
das Mestas				A Coruña
Minho	Serra de Meira, Meira	Atlantic Ocean	Rábade, Portomarín, Ribadavia, Melgaço, Monção, Tui, Valença do Minho	Lugo, Ourense e Pontevedra
Miñor	Serra do Galiñeiro, Gondomar	Ría de Vigo	Gondomar, Nigrán, Baiona	Pontevedra
Miñoto		dos Gafos		Pontevedra
Miñotos		Landrove		Lugo
Rego Mollopán		Mandeo	Aranga	A Coruña
Mondariz		Lambre		A Coruña
Rego de Montouto		Soldón		Lugo
Moreda				Lugo
Regato do Mouro		San Lázaro		Ourense
Regato do Muíño do Conde		Te		A Coruña
Rego dos Muíños		Anllóns		A Coruña
Regato de Muíños		Te		A Coruña
do Munxidoiro		San Lázaro		Ourense

=== N ===
Name	Source	Outlet	Flows through	Province
Naraio	Monte Forgoselo	Grande de Xuvia		A Coruña
Narla	Xiá, Friol	Minho	Friol, Lugo	Lugo
Narón		Minho		Lugo
Navea	Serra de San Mamede, Laza	Bibei	Chandrexa de Queixa, Río, A Pobra de Trives	Ourense.
Navia	Ferreirós de Valboa, Becerreá	Bay of Biscay	As Nogais, Navia de Suarna, Ibias, Grandas de Salime, Allande, Pezós, Eilao, Boal, Villayón, Coaña, Navia	Lugo and Asturias
Neira	Serra do Portelo	Minho		Lugo
Noceda	A Devesa, Ribadeo	Lexoso		Lugo
Noceda		Mao		Lugo

=== O ===
Name	Source	Outlet	Flows through	Province
Oca				Pontevedra
Oirán		Masma		Lugo
Oitavén	Serra do Suído, A Lama	Verdugo	A Lama, Ponte Caldelas, Fornelos de Montes, Soutomaior	Pontevedra
Oribio	Monte do Oribio	Lóuzara	Samos	Lugo
Orille				Ourense
Oseira				Ourense
Ouria		Eo		Lugo
Ourille		Arnoia		Ourense
Ouro	Serra do Xistral, O Pereiro, Alfoz	Bay of Biscay	O Valadouro, Alfoz	Lugo

=== P ===
Name	Source	Outlet	Flows through	Province
Carrozo de Paínzo		Soldón		Lugo
Pambre				Lugo
Parada		Oitavén		Pontevedra
Parada		Arnego		Pontevedra
Parada		Ferreira		Lugo
Paradela				A Coruña
Rego de Paraxes	Óutara, A Pobra do Brollón	Cabe		Lugo
Parga	Serra da Cova da Serpe, Cordal de Montouto	Ladra	Friol, Guitiriz, Begonte	Lugo
Parrote		Eume		A Coruña
Pazos		Parrote		A Coruña
Pedras		Barbanza		A Coruña
Pedrodo		Arnego		Pontevedra
Pego		Minho		Pontevedra
Rego do Pego		Almofrei		Pontevedra
Regato de Penacova		Teilán		Lugo
Penalba		Mao		Lugo
Peneda				Ourense
Regato do Penedo dos Lobos		San Lázaro		Ourense
Pequeno		Grande	Ribadeo	
Pequeno	Cordal de Neda, A Pastoriza	Minho	A Pastoriza, Castro de Rei, Cospeito	Lugo
Pereira				Ourense
Rego da Pereira, río Almofrei		Almofrei		Pontevedra
Regato da Pereira, río Cabe	Acedre, Pantón	Cabe		Lugo
Rego dos Petos		Tenorio		Pontevedra
Picarrexo	San Pedro do Incio, O Incio	Cabe	O Incio, A Pobra de Brollón	Lugo
de Picos		Masma		Lugo
Carrozo de Pinacedo, río Soldón		Soldón		Lugo
Carrozo de Pinacedo, rego de Valdenabais		Rego de Valdenabais		Lugo
Pintos		dos Gafos		Pontevedra
de Pol		Azúmara		Lugo
Pombal		dos Gafos		Pontevedra
Pombeiro				A Coruña
Ponte Bala		dos Gafos		Pontevedra
Ponteceso		Anllóns		A Coruña
Pontepedra				A Coruña
Regato Ponte Real		Ponxedo		Lugo
Ponte Saltillo		Parga		Lugo
do Pontillón		Ría de Vigo		Pontevedra
Ponxedo		Saa		Lugo
Porta da Veiga		Parga		Lugo
Portafontao		Parga		Lugo
Portaxesta		Parga		Lugo
Portecelo		Anllóns		A Coruña
Regato Portillón		Boedo		Lugo
Porto		Parrote		A Coruña
do Porto		de Cervaña	Moalde, Silleda	Pontevedra
Regato do Porto		Boedo		Lugo
Regato de Porto Augalonga		Roca		Lugo
Regato de Porto Barroso		Roca		Lugo
Portocando		Parga		Lugo
Regato de Porto de Lea		Roca		Lugo
do Porto do Cabo		Ría de Cedeira		A Coruña
Regato de Porto Moa		Roca		Lugo
Portorrosa				A Coruña
Portoscarros		Parga		Lugo
Regato do Portovello		Boedo		Lugo
Regato Pozo Verde		Antigua		Lugo
Prados		Anllóns		A Coruña
Pulgueira				A Coruña

=== Q ===
Name	Source	Outlet	Flows through	Province
Quenxe		Anllóns		A Coruña
Queo		Anllóns		A Coruña
Quiroga		Sil		Lugo

=== R ===
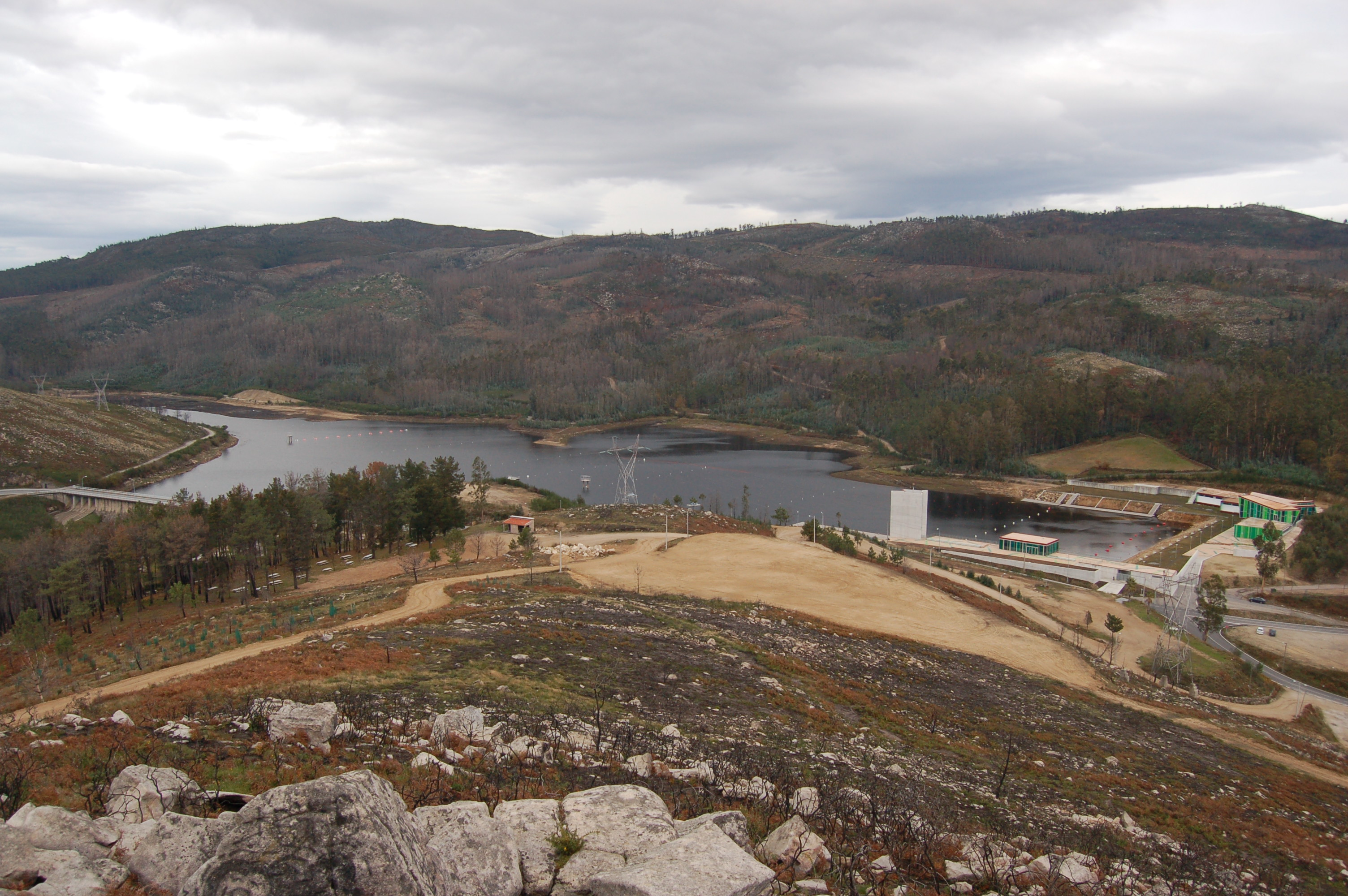
The Rons, dam at Pontillón

Name	Source	Outlet	Flows through	Province
Rabal		Navea		Ourense
Rabazal				Ourense
Racamonde				A Coruña
Regato de Raigosa		Umia		Pontevedra
de Rao		Navia		Lugo (province).
de Rebordondo	Rebordondo	Rubín		Ourense
Rego de Recheín		Soldón		Lugo
da Regueira		Xallas		A Coruña
Regato Revollón		Boedo		Lugo
Regato Rexedoiro		Boedo		Lugo
Rego Ríal		Ulla		Lugo
Ribadil		Minho		Pontevedra
Ribeira Grande	Serra de Queixa	Camba		Ourense
Ribeira Pequena	Serra de Queixa	Camba		Ourense
Riodolas		Casoio		Ourense
Regato de Rioseco	Monforte de Lemos	Cabe		Lugo
de Riotorto		Eo		Lugo
Rego Riveiro		Ulla		Lugo
Robra		Minho		Lugo
Roca	Os Vilares, Guitiriz	Parga	Guitiriz	Lugo
Regueiro de Rocaboa		Soldón		Lugo
Rodeiro				Pontevedra
Rodil	Vilardongo	Eo		Lugo
Rodís		Calvar		A Coruña
Rons				Pontevedra
Rosende				A Coruña
Rubín	A Pobra do Brollón	Saa	A Pobra do Brollón	Lugo
Rubín ou Albarellos		Búbal		Ourense
Ruxida de Curveiros		Boedo		Lugo
Ruzos		Masma		Lugo

=== S ===
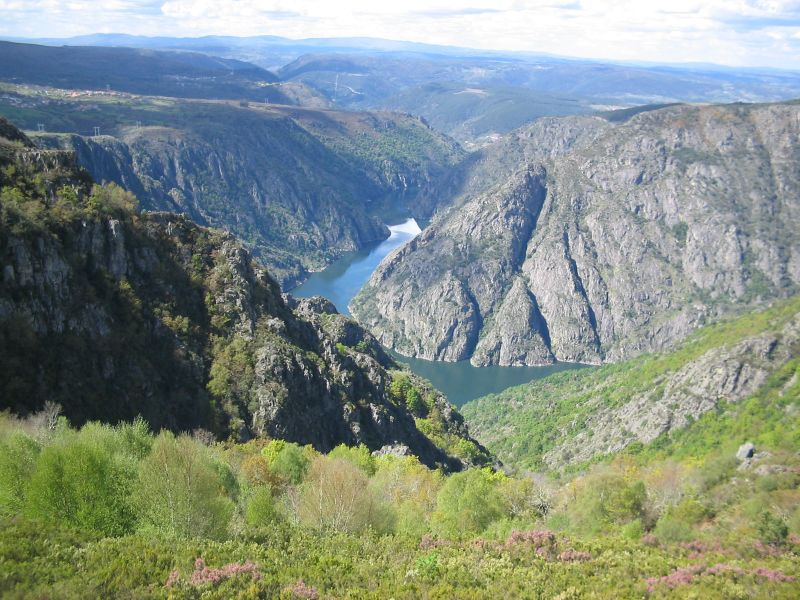
The Sil, Ribeira Sacra

Name	Source	Outlet	Flows through	Province
Saa	Trascastro, O Incio	Cabe	O Incio	Lugo
Saímes				A Coruña
Salas	Os Blancos	Limia	Calvos de Randín, Tourém, Lobios	Ourense
Sambreixo		Parga		Lugo
San Bartolomeu	Serra de Moncouso	Eume		A Coruña
San Bernabé				Ourense
San Lázaro	Serra de Queixa, A Pobra de Trives-Manzaneda	Bibei	A Pobra de Trives, Manzaneda	Ourense
San Miguel		Bibei		Ourense
Santa Lucía		Ulla	Teo	A Coruña
Regato de Sante	Mañente, Pantón	Cabe		Lugo
San Xusto				A Coruña
Sar	Bando, Santiago de Compostela	Ulla	Santiago de Compostela, Padrón, Dodro	A Coruña
Sardiñeira	Serra das Penas, Paradela	Minho	Paradela, Saviñao	Lugo
Rego de Sardueira		Picarrexo		Lugo
Sarela	Pardaces de Abaixo, A Peregrina, Santiago de Compostela	Sar	Santiago de Compostela	A Coruña
Sarria	Triacastela	Neira	Triacastela, Samos, Sarria, O Páramo, Láncara	Lugo
Saviñao				Lugo
Selmo		Sil		Lugo
Ser	Donís, Cervantes, Lugo	Navia	Cervantes, Lugo, Navia de Suarna, Becerreá	Lugo
Sil	La Cueta, León	Minho	Laciana, O Bierzo, Ourense (province)	León, |Ourense, Lugo
Sinto		Masma		Lugo
Rego Sobrecín	Óutara, A Pobra do Brollón	Cabe		Lugo
Soldón	Serra dos Cabalos, Quiroga	Sil	Quiroga	Lugo
Sor	Muras, Ourol	Ría do Barqueiro	Mañón, Muras, Ourol, O Vicedo	A Coruña, Lugo
Suarna	Fonsagrada	Navia		Lugo

=== T ===
Name	Source	Outlet	Flows through	Province
Tambre	A Porta, Sobrado	Ría de Muros e Noia	Sobrado, Curtis, Vilasantar, Boimorto, Mesía, Frades, Arzúa, O Pino, Oroso, Ordes, Trazo, Tordoia, Santiago de Compostela, Val do Dubra, Ames, A Baña, Brión, Negreira, Outes, Mazaricos, Noia, Lousame	A Coruña
Támega	Serra de San Mamede, A Alberguería, Laza	Douro	Verín, Laza, Castrelo do Val, Oímbra, Chaves, Amarante	Ourense
Támoga	Serra do Xistral	Minho	Abadín, Cospeito, Begonte, Outeiro de Rei	Lugo
Tamuxe	Oia	Minho	Oia, O Rosal	Pontevedra
Te	Taragoña, Rianxo	Ría de Arousa	Rianxo	A Coruña
Tea	Serra do Suido-Faro de Avión	Minho	Covelo, Mondariz, Mondariz-Balneario, Ponteareas, Salvaterra de Miño	Pontevedra
Tebra				Pontevedra
Teilán		Mao		Lugo
Regato de Teimoi		Mao		Lugo
Tella		Santa Lucía		A Coruña
Tenorio	Monte Tenorio, Cotobade	Lérez	Cotobade	Pontevedra
Termes	Empiade, Cerdeira, As Neves	Minho	As Neves	Pontevedra
Tines	Mazaricos	Ría de Muros e Noia	Mazaricos, Outes	A Coruña
Tolda		Boedo		Lugo
Torneiros		Azúmara		Lugo
Toxa	Forcarei	O Deza	Forcarei, Silleda	Pontevedra
Traba	Lousame	Ría de Muros e Noia	Lousame, Noia	A Coruña
Trabada		Eo		Lugo
Regato Trasadehesa		Antigua		Lugo
Tras da Serra	Alto de San Xoán, Ribeira, Ambosores	Sor		Lugo
Rego de Tras das Penas	San Pedro do Incio, O Incio	Cabe		Lugo
Trimaz		Ladra		Lugo
Tronceda	Serra do Xistral	Masma	Mondoñedo	Lugo
Tuño		Arnoia		Ourense
Turía		Eo		Lugo

=== U ===
Name	Source	Outlet	Flows through	Province
Rego da Uceira		Calvar		A Coruña
Ulla	Os Ferreiros, Monterroso	Ría de Arousa		A Coruña, Pontevedra
Uma		Tea		Pontevedra
Umia	Aciveiro, Forcarei	Ría de Arousa	Forcarei, A Estrada, Cuntis, Moraña, Caldas de Reis, Portas, Meis, Vilanova de Arousa, Ribadumia, Cambados	Pontevedra

=== V ===
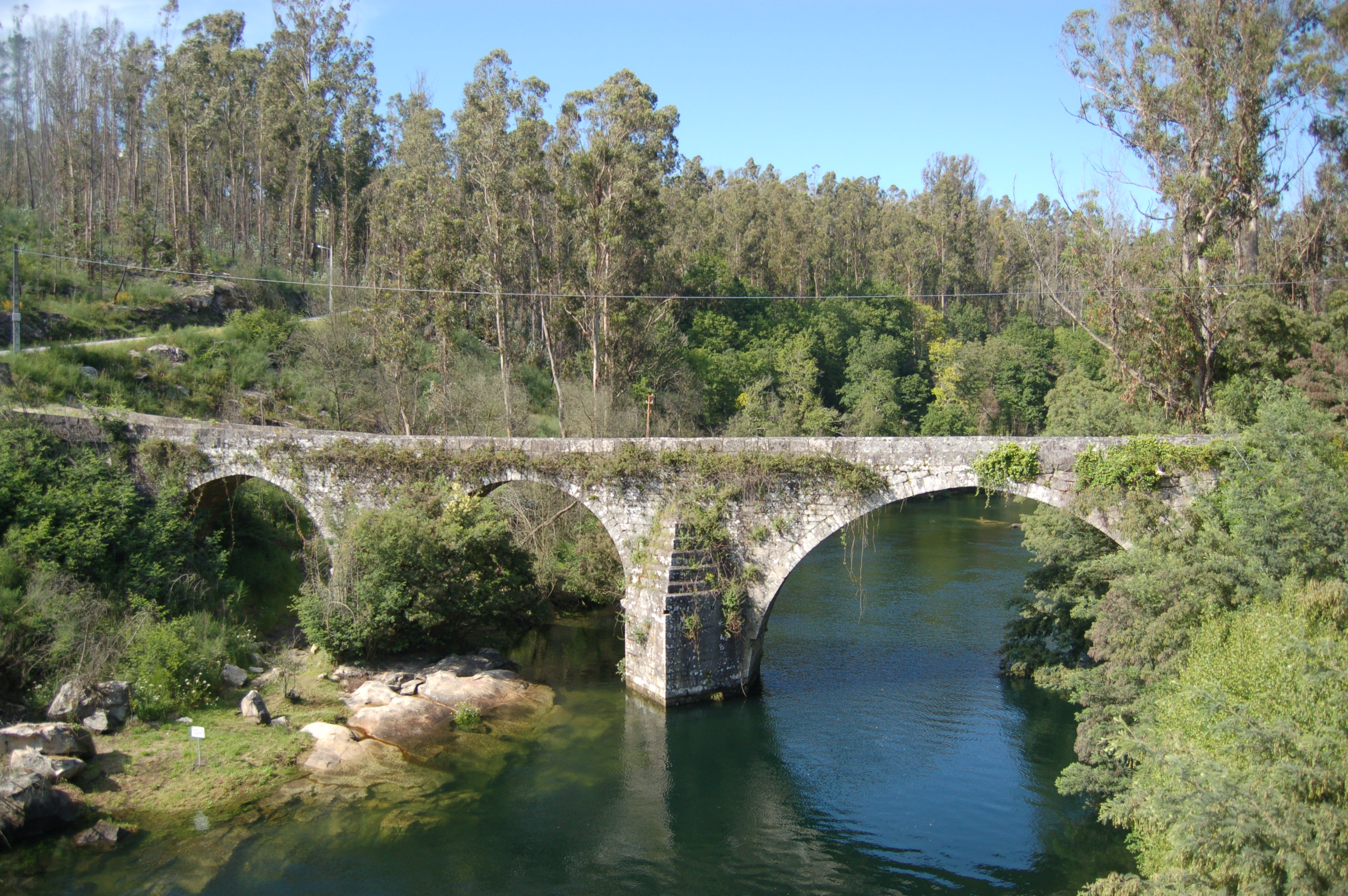
The Verdugo, medieval bridge at Comboa

Name	Source	Outlet	Flows through	Province
Vaa	Leiloio, Malpica de Bergantiños	Atlantic Ocean	Malpica de Bergantiños	A Coruña
Valborrás		Riodolas		Ourense
Carrozo do Val da Cova		Soldón		Lugo
Rego Val de Forgas	Óutara, A Pobra do Brollón	Cabe		Lugo
Carrozo do Val de Parada		Soldón		Lugo
Valderías				Ourense
Valdohome		Parada		Pontevedra
Valga	Barcala, A Estrada	Ulla	A Estrada, Valga	Pontevedra
Carrozo do Val Herboso		Soldón		Lugo
Valiñadares		Masma		Lugo
Valiñas	A Laracha	Mero	A Laracha, Culleredo, Cambre	A Coruña
Valouta				Lugo
Vao		Anllóns		A Coruña
Vao		Calvar		A Coruña
da Veiga	Monforte de Lemos	Cinsa		Lugo
Regato da Veiga	Monforte de Lemos	Cabe		Lugo
Ventín		Oitavén		Pontevedra
Verdugo	Outeiro Grande	Ría de Vigo	A Lama, Ponte Caldelas, Soutomaior, Pontevedra	Pontevedra
Vexo				A Coruña
Vilacoba				A Coruña
Vilacampa		Landrove		Lugo
Vilachán				Pontevedra
Vilaflores		Parga		Lugo
Vilamaior		Xallas		A Coruña
Vilar		Xallas		A Coruña
Rego do Vilar		Pequeno		Lugo
Vilariño		Arnego		Pontevedra
de Vilarmiel		Soldón		Lugo
de Vilaselán	Ribadeo		Ribadeo	Lugo
de Vilaver		Ser		Lugo
Vixoi				A Coruña

=== X ===
Name	Source	Outlet	Flows through	Province
Xallas	monte Castelo, Coristanco	Atlantic Ocean	Coristanco, Santa Comba, A Baña, Zas, Mazaricos, Carnota, Dumbría	A Coruña
Xanceda				Lugo
Xantas		Sor		A Coruña
Xares	Pena Trevinca, A Veiga	Bibei	A Veiga, O Bolo, Larouco	Ourense
Xarío	Ar, Pontedeume	Baxoi	Pontedeume, Minho	A Coruña
da Xesta		Oitavén		Pontevedra
Xesta				Pontevedra
Xoanceda				Lugo
Xora			Vimianzo	A Coruña
Xunco	Montes de Cabaleiros	Bay of Biscay		Lugo
Xubia	Montes da Serra, Somozas, Galicia	Ría de Ferrol	Somozas, Galicia, Narón, Neda	A Coruña
Xuliana	Taboexa, As Neves	Minho	As Neves	Pontevedra

== See also ==
- Galicia, Spain#Hydrography
- Gallery (1)
- Gallery (2)
- Maps of river basins of Galicia
