= David Mitogo =

Equatoguinean footballer (1990–2023)

Personal information
- Full name: David Edú García Mitogo
- Date of birth: 18 May 1990
- Place of birth: Bata, Equatorial Guinea
- Date of death: 11 May 2023 (aged 32)
- Place of death: A Reza, A Arnoia, Spain
- Height: 1.75 m (5 ft 9 in)
- Position: Forward

Youth career
- La Morenica
- Ponferradina
- La Morenica
- 2006–2008: Ponferradina

Senior career*
Years	Team	Apps	(Gls)
2008–2012	Ponferradina B	78	(14)
2009–2010	Ponferradina	7	(1)
2012–2013	Teruel	31	(4)
2013	Atlético Bembibre	16	(9)
2014	Vittoriosa Stars	12	(2)
2015	Atlético Bembibre	7	(3)
2015–2016	Barco	31	(10)
2016	Compostela	16	(4)
2017	Unionistas	18	(4)
2017–2018	Barco	34	(6)
2018–2019	Arenteiro	27	(4)
2020	Somozas	4	(0)
2020–2021	As Pontes	31	(11)
2021	Sarriana	12	(3)
2022–2023	Atlético Arnoia	36	(13)

International career^{‡}
2010	Equatorial Guinea U20	1	(1)
2010–2016	Equatorial Guinea	6	(0)
- * Club domestic league appearances and goals as of 7 May 2023 ‡ National team caps and goals as of 11 October 2016

David Edú García Mitogo (18 May 1990 – May 2023) was an Equatorial Guinean footballer who played as a forward. He capped for the Equatorial Guinea national team.

On 11 May 2023, Mitogo went missing by the river Minho. He was found dead in the river Avia on 23 May.

== Club career ==
Born in Bata, Mitogo moved to Spain at the age of only three. He began his youth career with CD La Morenica, and later joined SD Ponferradina as a cadet; however, he was dissatisfied with his time at the club and returned to his previous team at the end of the season.

At 16, Mitogo ultimately returned to Ponferradina to complete his formation. He made his senior debut with the reserve side, in the fourth division.

On 20 September 2009, aged 19, Mitogo made his first appearance for Ponferradina's main squad, in a third level match against SD Eibar, scoring the only goal of the game in the process. Still mainly registered with the B's, he appeared in a further six games for the first team as they finally achieved promotion to division two.

Playing for Ponferradina B against CD Huracán Z on 24 October 2010, Mitogo suffered a torn anterior cruciate ligament in his left knee, being sidelined for six months.

== International career ==
In April 2010, Mitogo was called by the Equatoguinean national under-20 team for the second match against Gabon in the 2011 African Youth Championship qualifiers (preliminary round). He scored the Equatoguinean goal, in a 1–1 draw.

In late July 2010, Mitogo received his first callup for the full side, for a friendly with Morocco on 11 August. He came on as a substitute for Juan Mbela in the 67th minute.

== Personal life ==
Mitogo came from a multiracial background. His white father, whose surname is García, was Spanish, while his black mother, surnamed Mitogo, was a Fang.

== Disappearance and death ==
On 11 May 2023, Mitogo disappeared. Before his disappearance, he sent several messages of gratitude to his teammates. At the time, only trace found by the authorities was his cell phone, which appeared on the bridge that connects the cities of Arnoia and Ribadavia. His body was recovered from river Avia two weeks later, on 23 May.

== See also ==
- List of solved missing person cases (2020s)
