= Arnoia =

Arnoia may also refer to:

- A Arnoia, a municipality in the province of Ourense in the Galicia region of north-west Spain
- Arnoia, a tributary river of the río Miño in Galicia, northwest Spain
- Castle of Arnóia, a medieval castle in civil parish of Arnóia, in Portugal
