= List of Sites of Community Importance in Galicia =

This is a list of Sites of Community Importance in Galicia.

| ID | Name | Coordinates | Image |
|---|---|---|---|
| ES0000001 | Cíes Islands (official name: Illas Cíes); Other names: n/a | 42.2167°N 8.9044°W | Looks like this Site of Community Interest has an image. Don't worry, you can take one of your own, and upload it too! |
| ES1110001 | Ortigueira - Mera (official name: Ortigueira - Mera); Other names: n/a | 43.7031°N 7.8352°W | Looks like this Site of Community Interest has an image. Don't worry, you can take one of your own, and upload it too! |
| ES1110002 | Costa Ártabra (official name: Costa Ártabra); Other names: n/a | 43.7181°N 7.9548°W | Looks like this Site of Community Interest has an image. Don't worry, you can take one of your own, and upload it too! |
| ES1110003 | Fragas do Eume (official name: Fragas do Eume); Other names: n/a | 43.3812°N 7.9934°W | Looks like this Site of Community Interest has an image. Don't worry, you can take one of your own, and upload it too! |
| ES1110004 | Encoro de Abegondo - Cecebre (official name: Encoro de Abegondo - Cecebre); Other names: n/a | 43.2715°N 8.2628°W | Looks like this Site of Community Interest has an image. Don't worry, you can take one of your own, and upload it too! |
| ES1110005 | Costa da Morte (official name: Costa da Morte); Other names: n/a | 42.8683°N 9.2448°W | Looks like this Site of Community Interest has an image. Don't worry, you can take one of your own, and upload it too! |
| ES1110006 | The Dunes of Corrubedo Natural Park (official name: Complexo húmido de Corrubedo); Other names: n/a | 42.5306°N 9.0903°W | Looks like this Site of Community Interest has an image. Don't worry, you can take one of your own, and upload it too! |
| ES1110007 | Betanzos - Mandeo (official name: Betanzos - Mandeo); Other names: n/a | 43.2519°N 8.1173°W | Looks like this Site of Community Interest has an image. Don't worry, you can take one of your own, and upload it too! |
| ES1110008 | Carnota - Monte Pindo (official name: Carnota - Monte Pindo); Other names: n/a | 42.8902°N 9.1189°W | Looks like this Site of Community Interest has an image. Don't worry, you can take one of your own, and upload it too! |
| ES1110009 | Costa de Dexo (official name: Costa de Dexo); Other names: n/a | 43.3991°N 8.3275°W | Looks like this Site of Community Interest has an image. Don't worry, you can take one of your own, and upload it too! |
| ES1110010 | Punta de Estaca de Bares (official name: Estaca de Bares); Other names: n/a | 43.7683°N 7.6967°W | Looks like this Site of Community Interest has an image. Don't worry, you can take one of your own, and upload it too! |
| ES1110011 | Esteiro do Tambre (official name: Esteiro do Tambre); Other names: n/a | 42.8078°N 8.9019°W | Looks like this Site of Community Interest has an image. Don't worry, you can take one of your own, and upload it too! |
| ES1110012 | Monte e lagoa de Louro (official name: Monte e lagoa de Louro); Other names: n/a | 42.7609°N 9.1149°W | Looks like this Site of Community Interest has an image. Don't worry, you can take one of your own, and upload it too! |
| ES1110013 | Xubia - Castro (official name: Xubia - Castro); Other names: n/a | 43.4797°N 8.0241°W | Looks like this Site of Community Interest has an image. Don't worry, you can take one of your own, and upload it too! |
| ES1110014 | Serra do Careón (official name: Serra do Careón); Other names: n/a | 42.9214°N 7.9556°W | Looks like this Site of Community Interest has an image. Don't worry, you can take one of your own, and upload it too! |
| ES1110015 | Anllóns (official name: Río Anllóns); Other names: n/a | 43.2319°N 8.8371°W | Looks like this Site of Community Interest has an image. Don't worry, you can take one of your own, and upload it too! |
| ES1110016 | Tambre (river) (official name: Río Tambre); Other names: n/a | 42.963°N 8.4401°W | Looks like this Site of Community Interest has an image. Don't worry, you can take one of your own, and upload it too! |
| ES1120001 | Ancares - Courel (official name: Ancares - Courel); Other names: n/a | 42.8758°N 6.9657°W | Looks like this Site of Community Interest has an image. Don't worry, you can take one of your own, and upload it too! |
| ES1120002 | Eo (river) (official name: Río Eo); Other names: n/a | 43.5208°N 7.0455°W | Looks like this Site of Community Interest has an image. Don't worry, you can take one of your own, and upload it too! |
| ES1120003 | Parga - Ladra - Támoga (official name: Parga - Ladra - Támoga); Other names: n/a | 43.1648°N 7.5689°W | Looks like this Site of Community Interest has an image. Don't worry, you can take one of your own, and upload it too! |
| ES1120004 | A Marronda (official name: A Marronda); Other names: n/a | 43.1024°N 7.2157°W | Looks like this Site of Community Interest has an image. Don't worry, you can take one of your own, and upload it too! |
| ES1120005 | As Catedrais beach (official name: As Catedrais); Other names: n/a | 43.5531°N 7.1226°W | Looks like this Site of Community Interest has an image. Don't worry, you can take one of your own, and upload it too! |
| ES1120006 | Carballido (official name: Carballido); Other names: n/a | 43.2856°N 7.1523°W | Looks like this Site of Community Interest has an image. Don't worry, you can take one of your own, and upload it too! |
| ES1120007 | Cruzul - Agüeira (official name: Cruzul - Agüeira); Other names: n/a | 42.8467°N 7.1542°W | Looks like this Site of Community Interest has an image. Don't worry, you can take one of your own, and upload it too! |
| ES1120008 | Monte Faro (official name: Monte Faro); Other names: n/a | 42.6288°N 7.8906°W | Looks like this Site of Community Interest has an image. Don't worry, you can take one of your own, and upload it too! |
| ES1120009 | Monte Maior (official name: Monte Maior); Other names: n/a | 43.6415°N 7.5364°W | This Site of Community Interest has no photo. Take one and upload it! Thanks! |
| ES1120010 | Negueira (official name: Negueira); Other names: n/a | 43.1355°N 6.8693°W | Looks like this Site of Community Interest has an image. Don't worry, you can take one of your own, and upload it too! |
| ES1120011 | Ría de Foz - Masma (official name: Ría de Foz - Masma); Other names: n/a | 43.5483°N 7.2604°W | Looks like this Site of Community Interest has an image. Don't worry, you can take one of your own, and upload it too! |
| ES1120012 | Río Landro (official name: Río Landro); Other names: n/a | 43.6287°N 7.6175°W | Looks like this Site of Community Interest has an image. Don't worry, you can take one of your own, and upload it too! |
| ES1120013 | Río Ouro (official name: Río Ouro); Other names: n/a | 43.5318°N 7.4217°W | Looks like this Site of Community Interest has an image. Don't worry, you can take one of your own, and upload it too! |
| ES1120014 | Sil Canyon (official name: Canón do Sil); Other names: n/a | 42.4198°N 7.6292°W | Looks like this Site of Community Interest has an image. Don't worry, you can take one of your own, and upload it too! |
| ES1120015 | Serra do Xistral (official name: Serra do Xistral); Other names: n/a | 43.4564°N 7.5767°W | Looks like this Site of Community Interest has an image. Don't worry, you can take one of your own, and upload it too! |
| ES1120016 | Río Cabe (official name: Río Cabe); Other names: n/a | 42.6441°N 7.4006°W | Looks like this Site of Community Interest has an image. Don't worry, you can take one of your own, and upload it too! |
| ES1120017 | Costa da Mariña occidental (official name: Costa da Mariña occidental); Other names: n/a | 43.7237°N 7.6297°W | Looks like this Site of Community Interest has an image. Don't worry, you can take one of your own, and upload it too! |
| ES1130001 | Baixa Limia – Serra do Xurés (official name: Baixa Limia); Other names: n/a | 41.9004°N 7.9855°W | Looks like this Site of Community Interest has an image. Don't worry, you can take one of your own, and upload it too! |
| ES1130002 | Macizo Central (official name: Macizo Central); Other names: n/a | 42.2175°N 7.2858°W | Looks like this Site of Community Interest has an image. Don't worry, you can take one of your own, and upload it too! |
| ES1130003 | Bidueiral de Montederramo (official name: Bidueiral de Montederramo); Other names: n/a | 42.2229°N 7.4912°W | This Site of Community Interest has no photo. Take one and upload it! Thanks! |
| ES1130004 | Pena Veidosa (official name: Pena Veidosa); Other names: n/a | 42.5286°N 7.9303°W | Looks like this Site of Community Interest has an image. Don't worry, you can take one of your own, and upload it too! |
| ES1130005 | Tâmega (river) (official name: Río Támega); Other names: n/a | 41.9235°N 7.4149°W | Looks like this Site of Community Interest has an image. Don't worry, you can take one of your own, and upload it too! |
| ES1130006 | Veiga de Ponteliñares (official name: Veiga de Ponteliñares); Other names: n/a | 42.0423°N 7.8504°W | This Site of Community Interest has no photo. Take one and upload it! Thanks! |
| ES1130007 | Trevinca (official name: Pena Trevinca); Other names: n/a | 42.2507°N 6.857°W | Looks like this Site of Community Interest has an image. Don't worry, you can take one of your own, and upload it too! |
| ES1130008 | Pena Maseira (official name: Pena Maseira); Other names: n/a | 41.9833°N 7.0134°W | This Site of Community Interest has no photo. Take one and upload it! Thanks! |
| ES1130009 | Serra da Enciña da Lastra (official name: Serra da Enciña da Lastra); Other names: n/a | 42.4773°N 6.8389°W | Looks like this Site of Community Interest has an image. Don't worry, you can take one of your own, and upload it too! |
| ES1140001 | Sistema fluvial Ulla - Deza (official name: Sistema fluvial Ulla - Deza); Other names: n/a | 42.7569°N 8.4957°W | Looks like this Site of Community Interest has an image. Don't worry, you can take one of your own, and upload it too! |
| ES1140002 | Lérez (official name: Río Lérez); Other names: n/a | 42.4519°N 8.604°W | Looks like this Site of Community Interest has an image. Don't worry, you can take one of your own, and upload it too! |
| ES1140003 | A Ramallosa (official name: A Ramallosa); Other names: n/a | 42.1177°N 8.8191°W | Looks like this Site of Community Interest has an image. Don't worry, you can take one of your own, and upload it too! |
| ES1140004 | Atlantic Islands of Galicia National Park (official name: Complexo Ons - O Grove); Other names: n/a | 42.382°N 8.9099°W | Looks like this Site of Community Interest has an image. Don't worry, you can take one of your own, and upload it too! |
| ES1140005 | Monte Aloia (official name: Monte Aloia); Other names: n/a | 42.0822°N 8.68°W | Looks like this Site of Community Interest has an image. Don't worry, you can take one of your own, and upload it too! |
| ES1140006 | Río Tea (official name: Río Tea); Other names: n/a | 42.212°N 8.4373°W | Looks like this Site of Community Interest has an image. Don't worry, you can take one of your own, and upload it too! |
| ES1140007 | O Baixo Miño (official name: Baixo Miño); Other names: n/a | 42.9829°N 8.7096°W | Looks like this Site of Community Interest has an image. Don't worry, you can take one of your own, and upload it too! |
| ES1140008 | Brañas de Xestoso (official name: Brañas de Xestoso); Other names: n/a | 42.6784°N 8.3286°W | Looks like this Site of Community Interest has an image. Don't worry, you can take one of your own, and upload it too! |
| ES1140009 | Cabo Udra (official name: Cabo Udra); Other names: n/a | 42.324°N 8.8284°W | Looks like this Site of Community Interest has an image. Don't worry, you can take one of your own, and upload it too! |
| ES1140010 | Costa da Vela (official name: Costa da Vela); Other names: n/a | 42.2773°N 8.868°W | Looks like this Site of Community Interest has an image. Don't worry, you can take one of your own, and upload it too! |
| ES1140011 | Gándaras de Budiño (official name: Gándaras de Budiño); Other names: n/a | 42.0622°N 8.6291°W | Looks like this Site of Community Interest has an image. Don't worry, you can take one of your own, and upload it too! |
| ES1140012 | Illas Estelas (official name: Illas Estelas); Other names: n/a | 42.15°N 8.8597°W | Looks like this Site of Community Interest has an image. Don't worry, you can take one of your own, and upload it too! |
| ES1140013 | Serra do Candán (official name: Serra do Candán); Other names: n/a | 42.5715°N 8.243°W | Looks like this Site of Community Interest has an image. Don't worry, you can take one of your own, and upload it too! |
| ES1140014 | Serra do Cando (official name: Serra do Cando); Other names: n/a | 42.466°N 8.3887°W | This Site of Community Interest has no photo. Take one and upload it! Thanks! |
| ES1140015 | Sobreirais do Arnego (official name: Sobreirais do Arnego); Other names: n/a | 42.7677°N 8.0893°W | Looks like this Site of Community Interest has an image. Don't worry, you can take one of your own, and upload it too! |
| ES1140016 | Enseada de San Simón (official name: Enseada de San Simón); Other names: n/a | 42.3121°N 8.6383°W | Looks like this Site of Community Interest has an image. Don't worry, you can take one of your own, and upload it too! |

== See also ==
- List of Sites of Community Importance in Spain
