= Rodil =

River in Asturias and Galicia, Spain

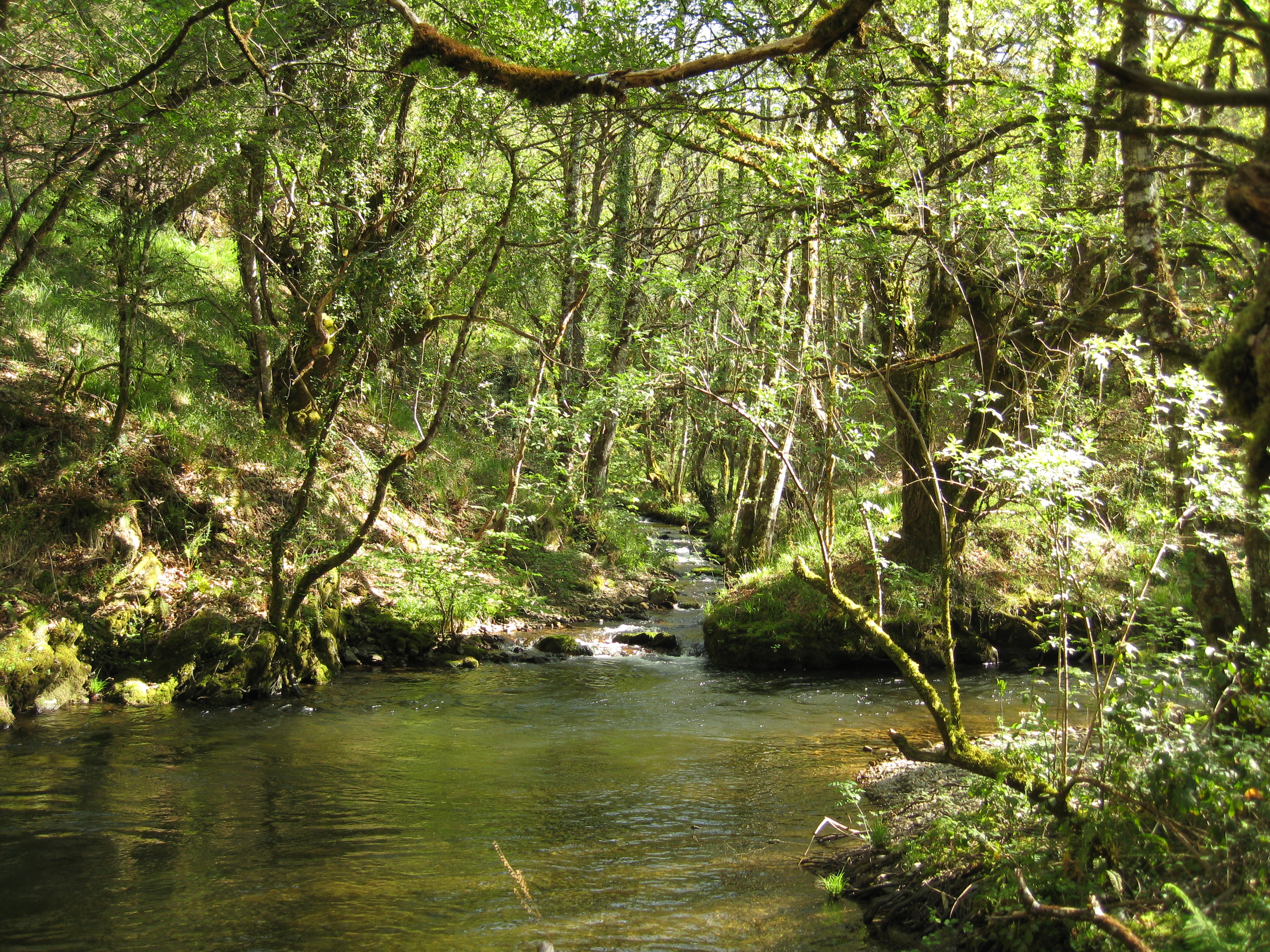
- Pontigon River endind in Rodil River

Location
- Country: Spain
- State: Asturias; Galicia

Physical characteristics
- Source
  - location: Near Baos
  - coordinates: 43°10′53″N 7°9′39″W
  - elevation: 340 m (1,120 ft)
- Mouth
  - location: Eo River, near Cabaceira
  - coordinates: 43°10′26″N 7°11′57″W
  - elevation: 248 m (814 ft)

The Rodil is a river in northern Spain flowing through the Autonomous Communities of Asturias and Galicia. It rises in the Asturian mountains and is the main tributary of the Eo River.

== See also ==
- Rivers of Galicia
