= Arnego =

River in Spain

Coordinates: 42°48′57″N 8°08′21″W

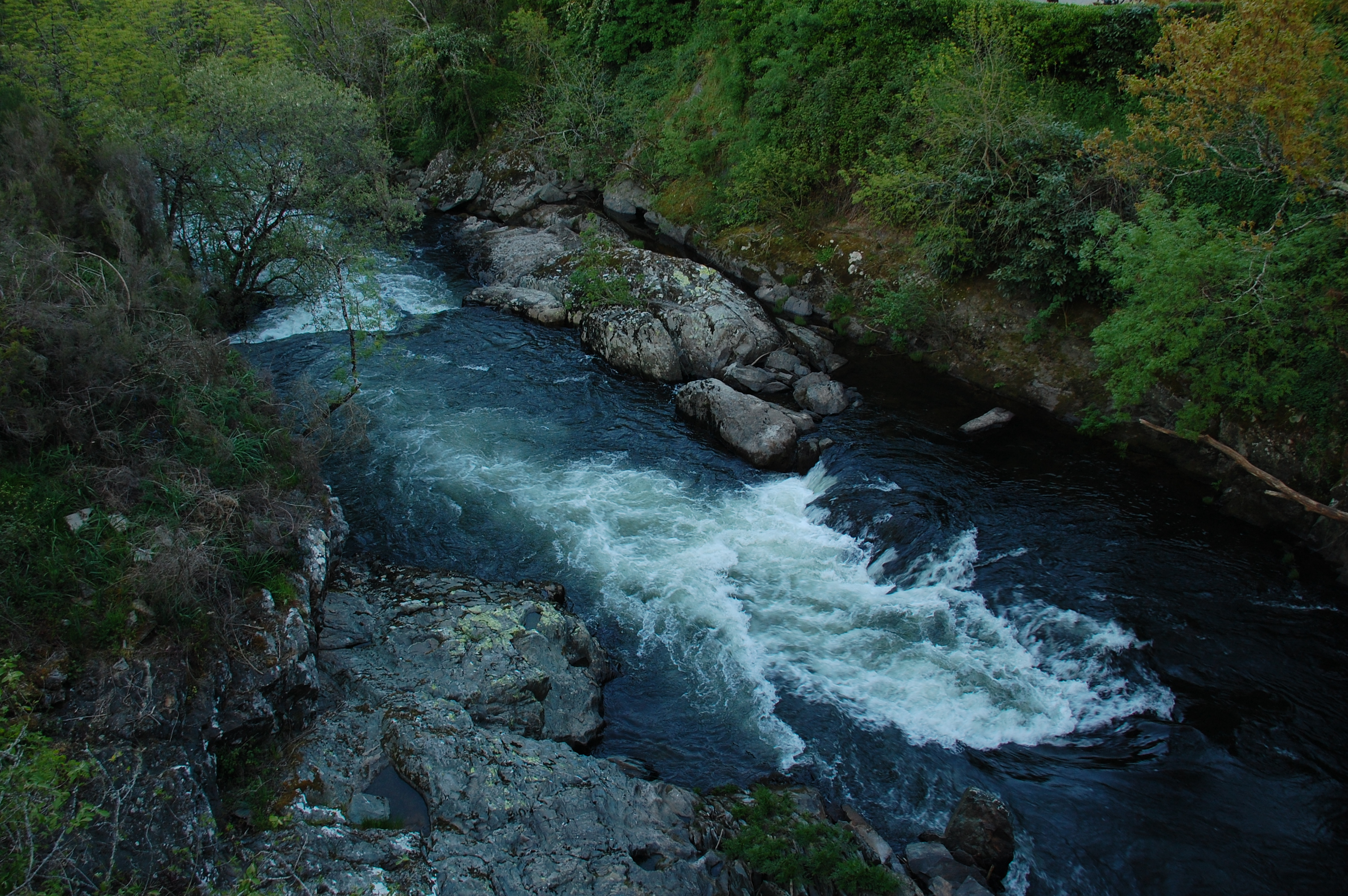
View from the Senra bridge.

The Arnego River is a river in the province of Pontevedra, Galicia, Spain. It is a tributary of the Ulla.

== Etymology ==
According to E. Bascuas, "Arnego", registered already as Arnego in 853, would derive from a form *Arnaikom or *Arnekom, belonging to the old European hydronymy, and derived from the Indoeuropean root *er- 'flow, move'.

== See also ==
- Rivers of Galicia
