= Verdugo (river) =

River in Spain

Coordinates: 42°21′N 8°37′W

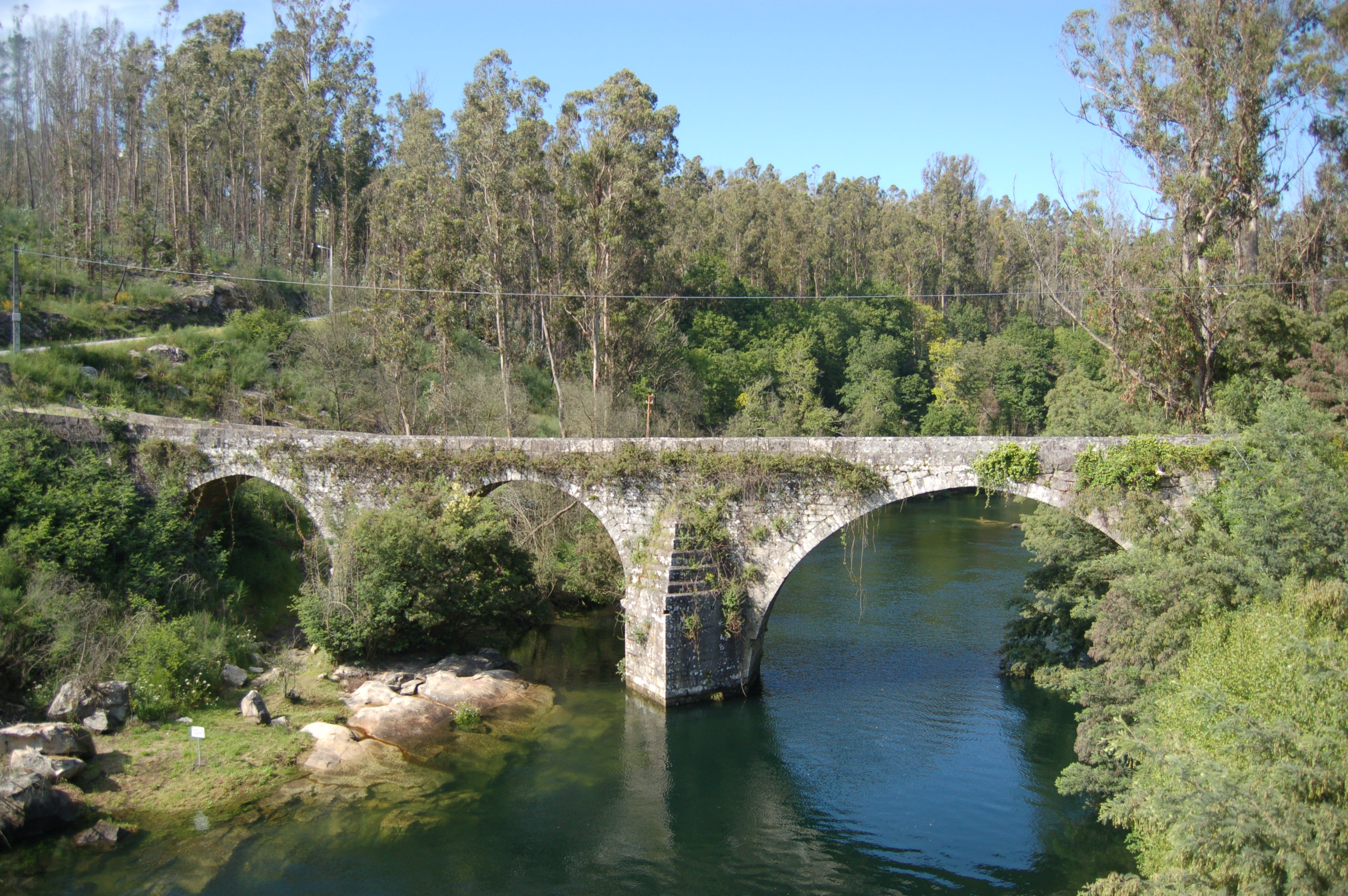
- Medieval bridge over the Río Verdugo in Comboa.

Location
- Country: Spain

Physical characteristics
- Source
  - elevation: 760 m (2,490 ft)
- Mouth
  - location: Ría de Vigo, Atlantic Ocean
- Length: 41 km (25 mi)
- Basin size: 357 km^{2} (138 sq mi)

The Verdugo is a river in the province of Pontevedra, Galicia, in north-western Spain. Its source is 760 metres (2,490 ft) above sea level, in the municipality of Forcarei. The river ends in the Atlantic Ocean, at Pontevedra.

== See also ==
- Rivers of Galicia
