= Mazaricos =

Coordinates: 42°56′N 8°57′W

Concello de Mazaricos
- municipality
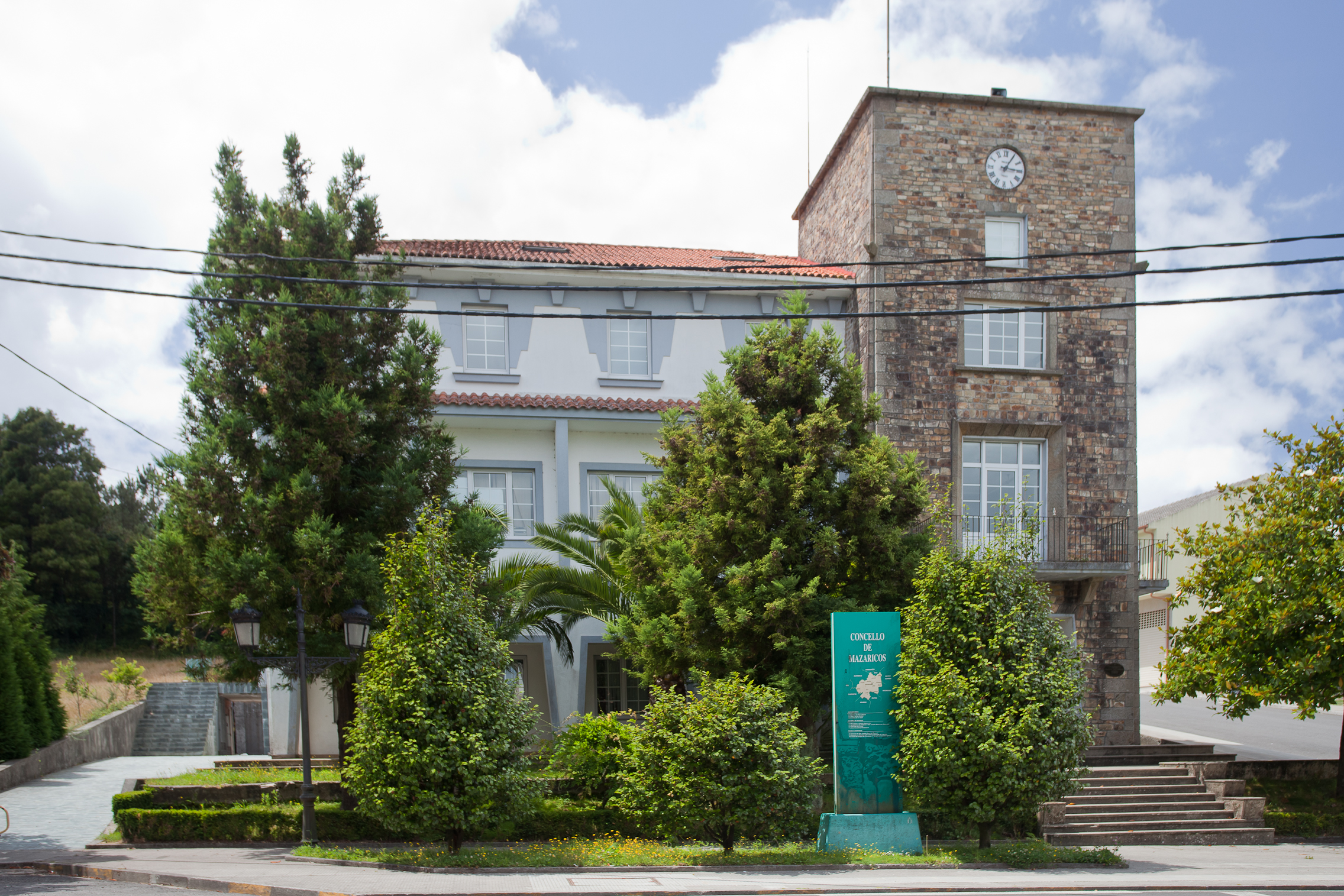

- Coat of arms
- Nickname: Mazaricos
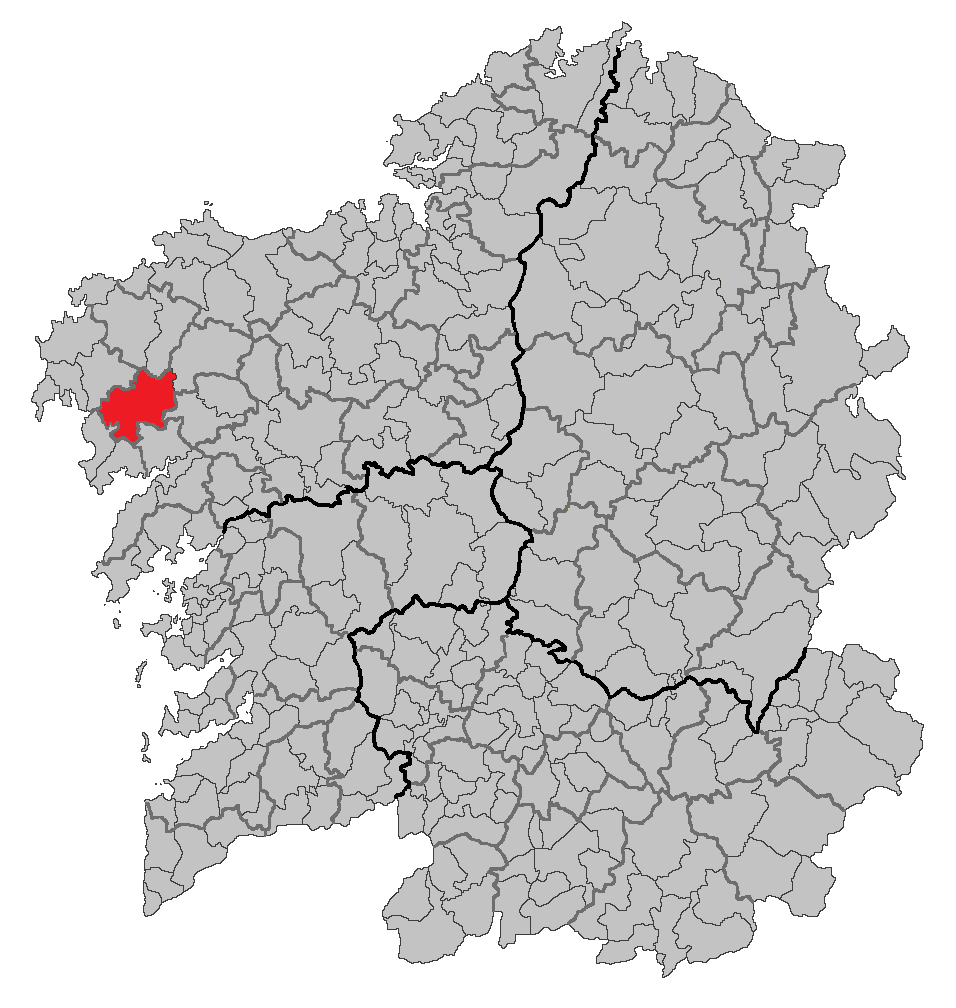
- Location of Mazaricos within Galicia
- Parroquias: Alborés, Antes, Arcos, Beba, Chacín, Coiro, Colúns, Corzón, Eirón, As Maroñas, Mazaricos & Os Vaos

Area
  - Total: 188.30 km^{2} (72.70 sq mi)

Population (2025-01-01)
  - Total: 3,721
  - Density: 19.76/km^{2} (51.18/sq mi)
- Time zone: UTC+1 (CET)
  - Summer (DST): UTC+2 (CEST)

Mazaricos is a municipality of northwestern Spain in the province of A Coruña, in the autonomous community of Galicia. It belongs to the comarca of Xallas. Its capital is in A Picota.

According to the National Statistics Institute of Spain, its population in 2008 was 5050 inhabitants.

== Location ==
Mazaricos is surrounded by the municipalities of Santa Comba, Muros, Carnota, Outes, Negreira, Vimianzo, Zas and Dumbría.

It is in a strategic position on the edge of the coast, and is about 10–15 minutes away by road from the beaches of the estuary of Muros and Noia and the largest beach in Galicia, in Carnota, which is nearly 8 km in length.

== Economy ==
Its main economic activities are farming and agriculture. Not surprisingly, the region of Xallas is one of the leading producers of Galician milk and Galician veal.

== Demographics ==
Development of the population of Mazaricos (1900-2011)
1900	1930	1950	1981	2004	2007
6,036	6,769	7,183	6,757	5,639	5,179
Sources: INE and IGE . (Census registration criteria varied between 1900 and 2011, and data from the INE and the IGE may not match.)

== Tourism ==
- Mazaricos is famous for its Galician dishes and other activities like fishing.
- The Xallas River is unique in Europe for ending in cascade, and it stretches for many kilometres.
- It has an active tourist centre called Naturmaz, where multiple activities related to the natural environment are offered.

== Historical and natural heritage ==
The landscape of Mazaricos is highlighted by its granite mountains, which are found in Galicia, such as Runa (641 meters), Aro (561 meters), Pedroso (504 meters), Montes das Paxareiras (560 meters its peak), and the foothills of Monte Pindo, which is nearly 700 metres above sea level, and is recognizable by its several peaks.

These mountains alternate with numerous river valleys and grasslands dedicated to livestock or agriculture, and numerous forests.

It has remarkable Celtic remains and numerous churches of various architectural styles.

You can also see Eiron Parish, a mine in the town of Corveira, just a few meters from the Corunna highway. In the town of Montellos (in the parish of Eiron) are the remains of an ancient Celtic fort.

== See also ==
List of municipalities in A Coruña
