= Río Grande (Lugo) =

River in Galicia, Spain

The Río Grande is a river in the province of Lugo, in the autonomous community of Galicia, Spain. It rises in the mountains of Trabada, then north into Lourenzá and finally Ribadeo.

== See also ==
- Rivers of Galicia
