= Sar (river) =

River in Galicia, Spain

Coordinates: 42.84819°N 8.64757°W

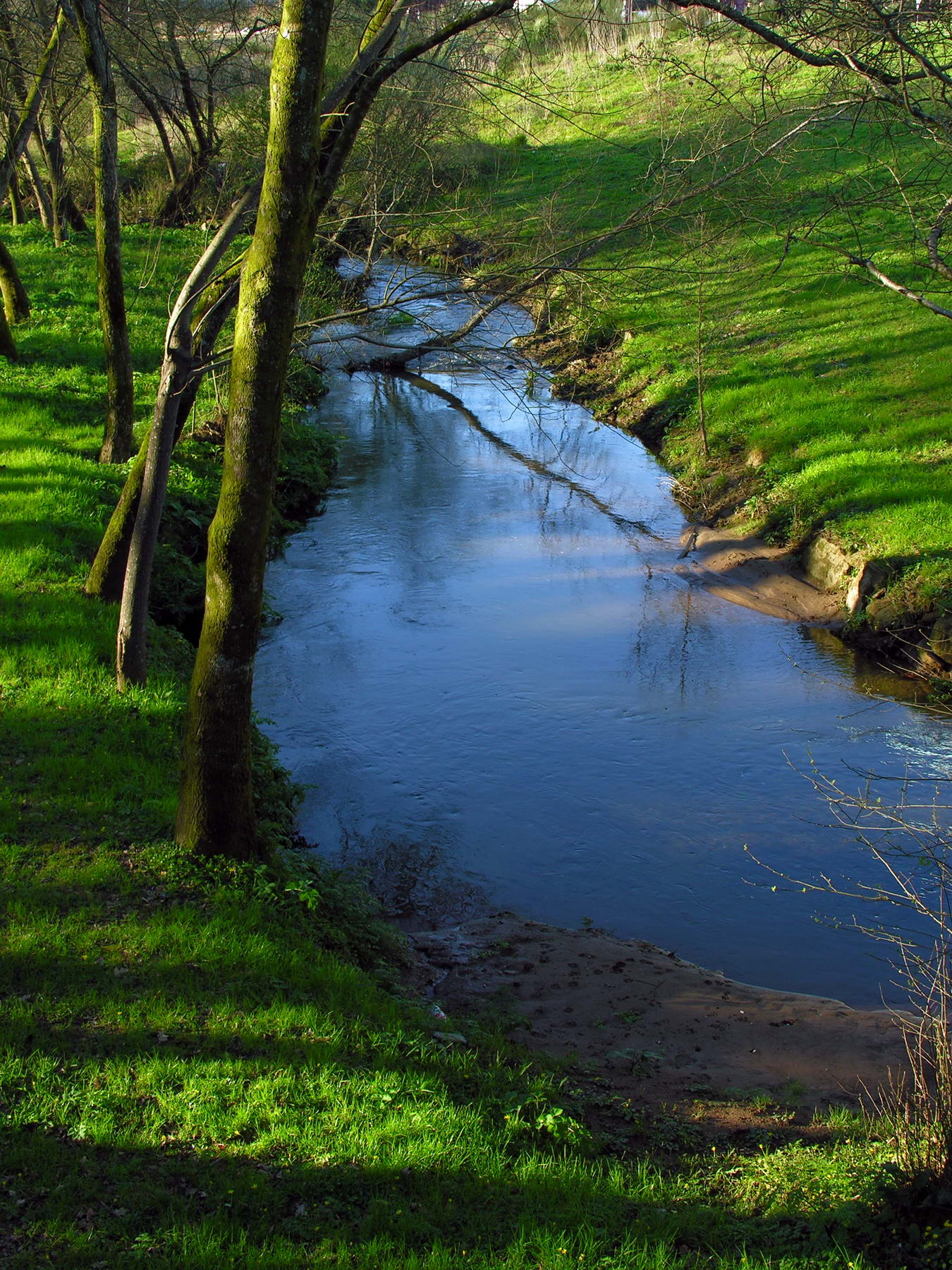
The Sar River near Compostela

The Sar is a river in Galicia, Spain. Rising near Santiago de Compostela, it flows through the A Maía valley for over 30 kilometres (19 mi) before entering the Ulla River, near Padrón.

Pomponius Mela (d. 45 AD) mentions it (Sars) in De situ orbis libri III and the Galician poet and novelist Rosalía de Castro wrote a well-known collection titled En las Orillas del Sar ("On the Banks of the Sar") in Castilian Spanish.

== See also ==
- List of rivers of Spain
- Rivers of Galicia
