= Arnoia (river) =

River in Spain

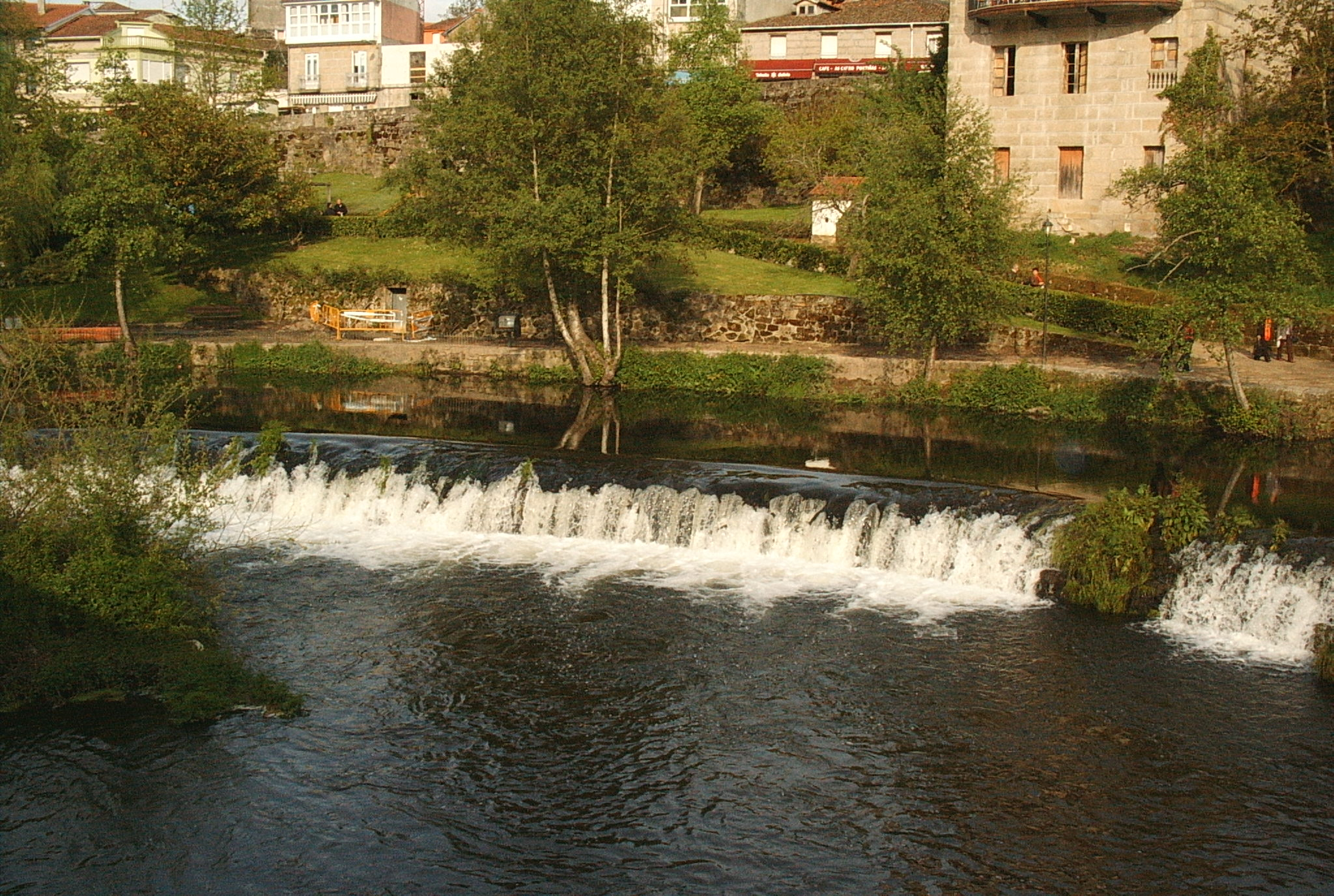
- The River Arnoia, tributary of the Miño, as it passes through Allariz

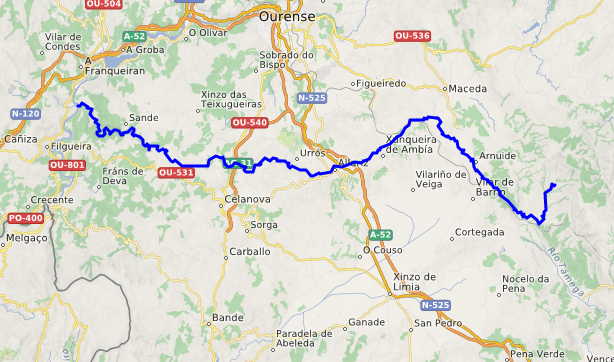
- Course of the Arnoia

Location
- Country: Spain

Physical characteristics
- Source: Sierra de San Mamede
  - location: Vilar de Barrio, Galicia, Spain
- Mouth
  - location: Río Miño
  - coordinates: 42°15′15.8″N 8°09′8.7″W
- Length: 84.5 km (52.5 mi)

Basin features
- Progression: Minho→ Atlantic Ocean

The River Arnoia (Galician: río Arnoia) is a tributary of the río Miño in Galicia, northwest Spain. At 84.5 kilometers, it is the longest river in the province of Ourense. The Spanish wine denominación de origen protegida of Ribeiro DOP is located at the confluences of the valleys formed by the rivers Miño, Avia, and Arnoia.

== Etymology ==
The name territorio Arnogie (Arnogie territory) was first documented in 889 and fluvio Arnogie (Arnogie River) in 936. According to E. Bascuas, the toponym "Arnoia" would be derived from the Paleo-European base * Ar-n-, derived from the Indo-European root * er- 'flow, move', with hydronymic significance.

== See also ==
- List of rivers of Spain
- Rivers of Galicia
- Galician wine
- Spanish wine
