= Xallas =

Coordinates: 42.9833°N 8.9°W

O Xallas
- Comarca
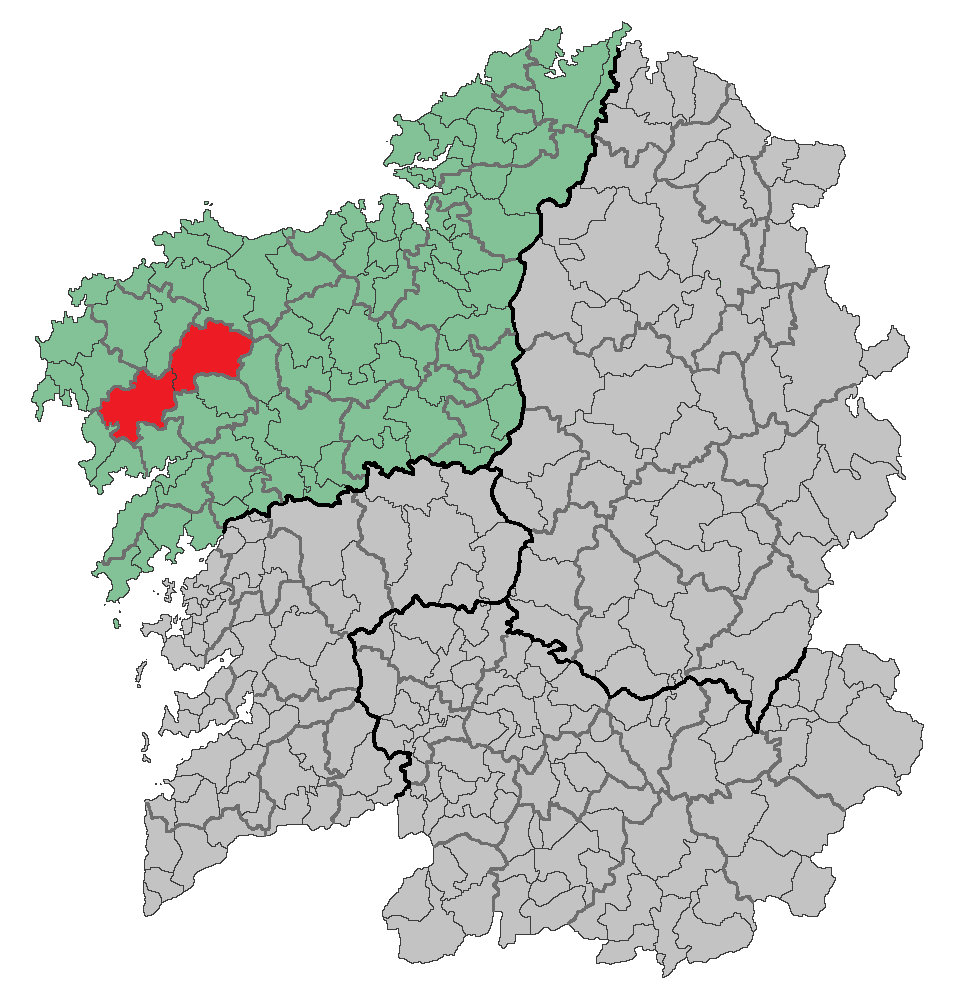
- Country: Spain
- Autonomous community: Galicia
- Province: A Coruña
- Capital: Santa Comba
- Municipalities: List: Mazaricos, Santa Comba

Area
  - Total: 394.7 km^{2} (152.4 sq mi)

Population
  - Total: 16,343
  - Density: 41.41/km^{2} (107.2/sq mi)
- Demonym: Xalleiros
- Time zone: UTC+1 (CET)
  - Summer (DST): UTC+2 (CEST)

O Xallas is a comarca in the Galician Province of A Coruña. The overall population of this local region is 16,343 (2005).

== Municipalities ==
- Mazaricos
- Santa Comba
