= Arenteiro =

River in Galicia, Spain

Coordinates: 42°23′48″N 8°08′37″W

- Río Arenteiro
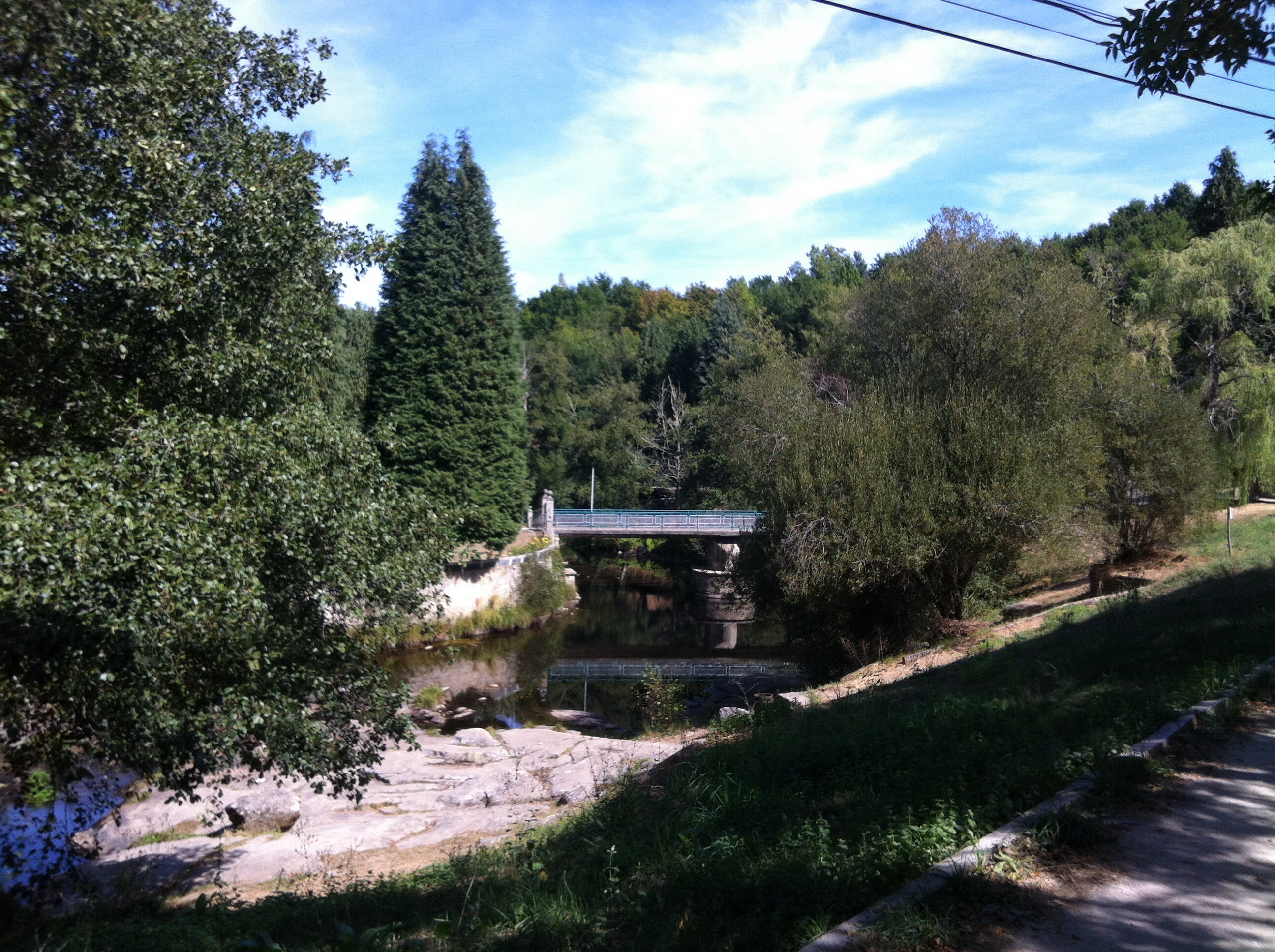
- Bathing area of the Arenteiro River
- Interactive map of Arenteiro

The Arenteiro is a river in Galicia, in Spain.

== See also ==
- Rivers of Galicia
