= Anllóns =

River in Spain

Coordinates: 43.2307°N 8.9456°W

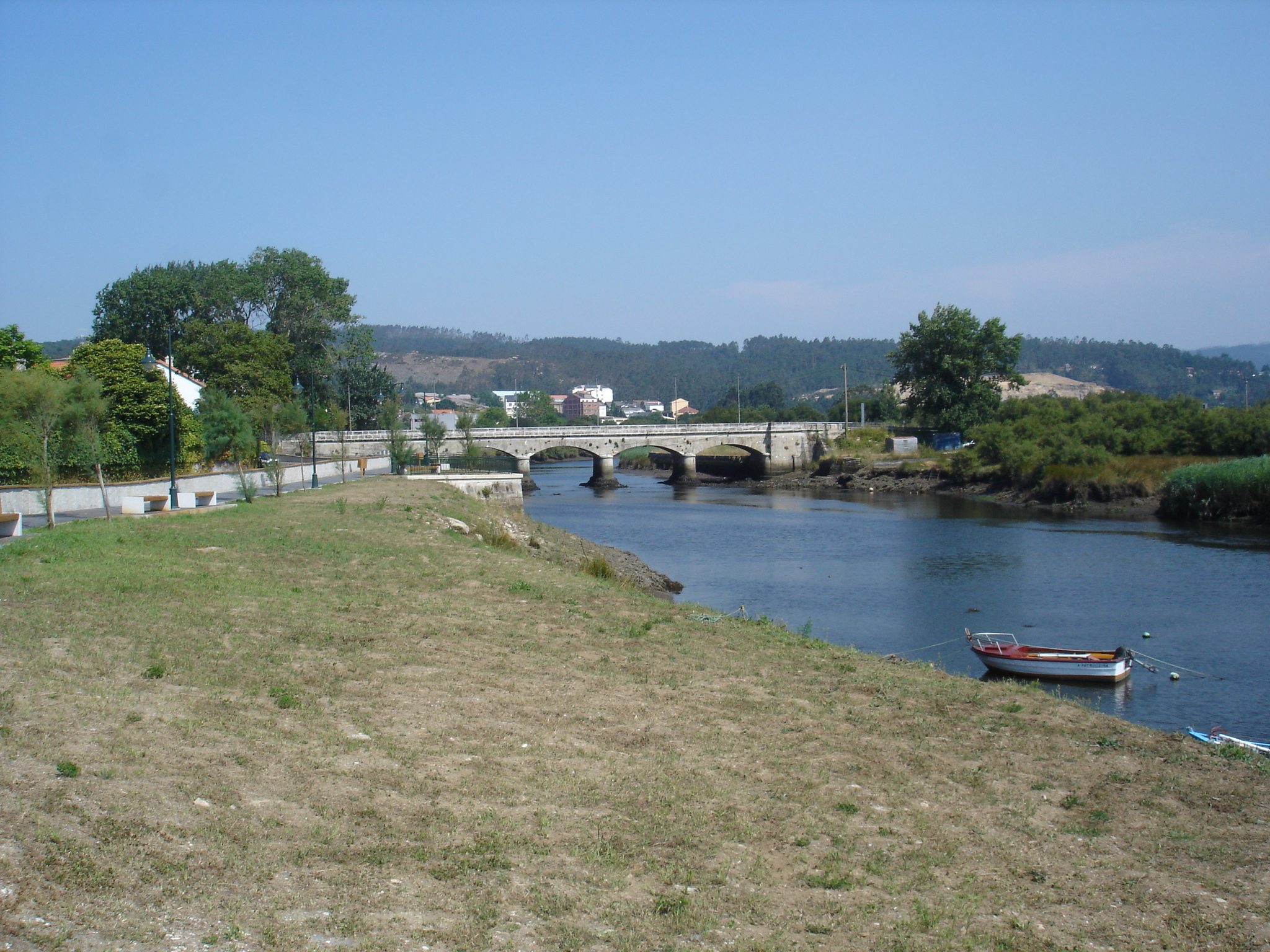
- The Anllóns near its mouth

Location
- Country: Spain

Physical characteristics
- Source
  - location: Xalo mounts, Province of A Coruña, Galicia.
  - elevation: 400 m (1,300 ft)
- Mouth
  - location: Atlantic Ocean
- Length: 54.4 km (33.8 mi)

The Anllóns is a Galician river that begins in the Xalo Mountains at an elevation of 400 metres (1,300 ft) above sea level and flows into the Atlantic via the Ria of Corme and Laxe.

Along its 54.4-kilometre (33.8 mi) course, it crosses the municipalities of Cabana de Bergantiños, Carballo, Cerceda, Coristanco, and Ponteceso. Its average flow is 9.931 cubic metres per second (350.7 cu ft/s).

== Background ==
It was declared a Site of Community Importance in the year 2001. It is fed by brooks like the Graña, Quenxe, Acheiro, Abaixo, Queo or Bertón during its high course. After the pass at Mount Neme, it receives the water of the brooks Gándara, Bandeira, Vao, Galvar, Portecelo or Batán, and in its low course its tributaries include the brooks Lourido, Ponteceso, Prados and Bouzas.

== See also ==
- List of rivers of Spain
- Rivers of Galicia
- Way of the Lighthouses
