= Tea River =

Coordinates: 0°30′30″S 65°08′31″W

Location
- Country: Brazil

Physical characteristics
- Source
  - location: Amazonas state

Tea River is a river of Amazonas state in north-western Brazil.

== See also ==
- List of rivers of Amazonas
