= Avia (river) =

River in Spain

Coordinates: 42°16′48″N 8°08′34″W

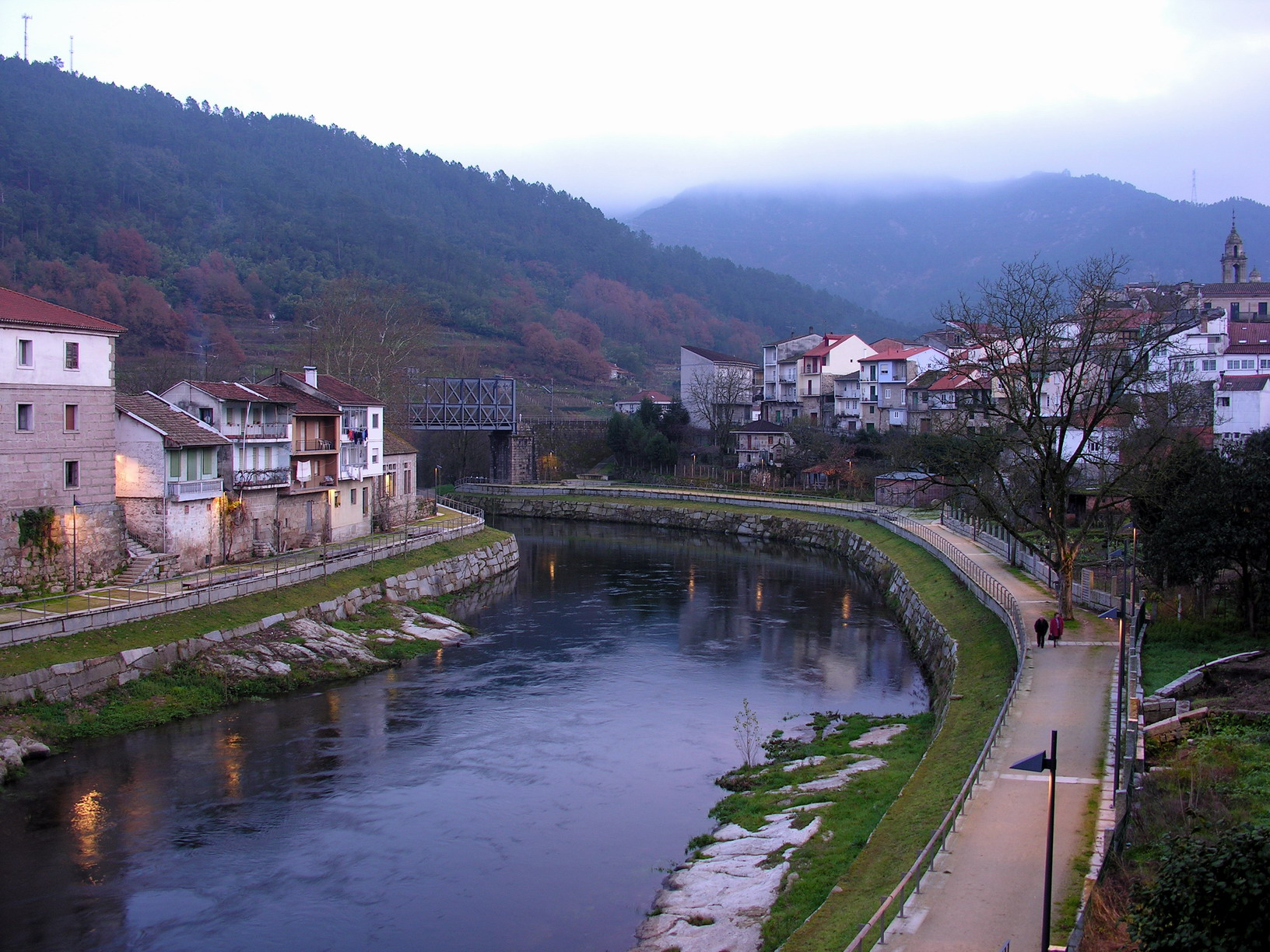
- Sunset in Ribadavia

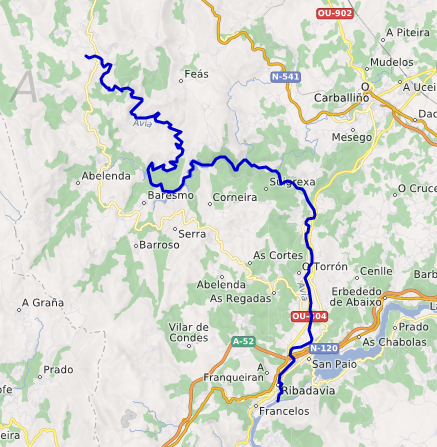

Location
- Country: Spain

Physical characteristics
- Source
  - location: Serra of the Suído, Province of Ourense, Galicia.
  - elevation: 880 m (2,890 ft)
- Mouth
  - location: Miño River, (Atlantic Ocean)
- Length: 36.70 km (22.80 mi)

Basin features
- Progression: Minho→ Atlantic Ocean

The Avia River is a tributary of the Minho river (Miño River in Spanish) with a length of 36.70 kilometres (22.80 mi). It is the longest river in the autonomous community of Galicia, Spain.

It begins in the serra of the Suído at a height of 880 metres (2,890 ft) in the place called Fonte Avia (municipality of Avión). It follows an SO-NL direction after arriving to the artificial lake of Albarellos, between the municipalities of Leiro, Boborás and Avión. After the artificial lake it continues until Boborás, turning there in SL direction. It flows in Ribadavia. Its tributaries include the Maquiáns River, Viñao River, and Arenteiro River, and it runs past the communities of Boborás, Leiro, and Ribadavia.

== See also ==
- List of rivers of Spain
- Rivers of Galicia
