= Juan Pablo Mbela =

Equatoguinean footballer

Personal information
- Full name: Juan Pablo Mbela Roku
- Date of birth: 5 August 1982 (age 44)
- Place of birth: Malabo, Equatorial Guinea
- Height: 1.75 m (5 ft 9 in)
- Positions: Striker; left winger

Youth career
- 1998–2000: Strasbourg

Senior career*
Years	Team	Apps	(Gls)
2000–2005	ASM Vénissieux		
2005–2006	SR Colmar		
2006–2007	Gap HAFC		
2007–2008	Rhône-Crussol		
2009	Saint-Priest		
2010	Ain Sud		
2010–2011	Le Puy Foot		
2011	Saint-Priest		
2012	CO Saint-Pierre		

International career
2008–2010	Equatorial Guinea	4	(0)
2011	Equatorial Guinea B	2	(0)
- * Club domestic league appearances and goals

Juan Pablo Mbela Roku (born 5 August 1982) is an Equatoguinean former professional football who played as a striker.

== Club career ==
Mbela was born in Malabo, Equatorial Guinea. He was formed as footballer at RC Strasbourg. Between 2000 and 2008, he played for French lower-league clubs: ASM Vénissieux, SR Colmar, Gap HAFC and Rhône-Crussol.

In January 2009, Mbela tried in the Italian Third Division side Crotone, but returned to France the following month.

In 2012 he played for CO Saint-Pierre in the second division of Réunion.

== International career ==
Discovered and called by Vicente Engonga, Mbela played for Equatorial Guinea national team in two World Cup 2010 Qualifying matches, against Sierra Leone (in Freetown, Sierra Leone) and South Africa (in Malabo). In 2009 he also featured in a friendly match against Ivory Coast and in August 2010 against Morocco.
