= River Cabe =

River in Spain

Cabe
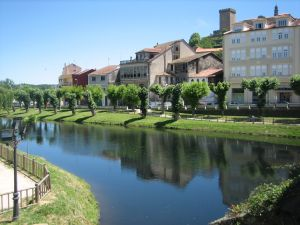
- The river Cabe in the Province of Lugo

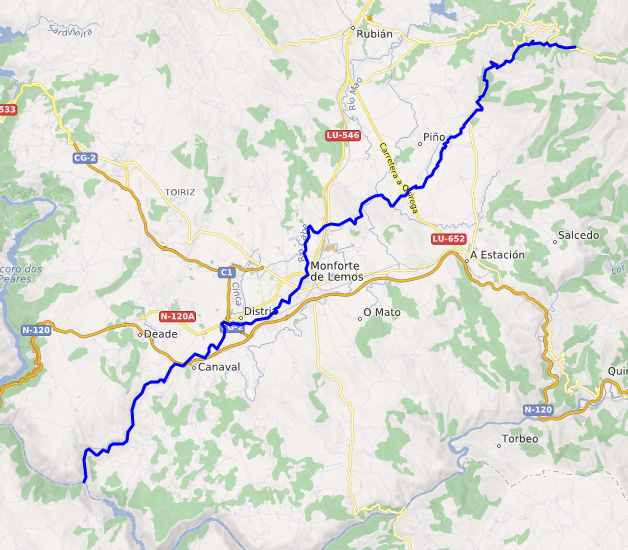
- Location of the Cabe River

- Location within Galicia
- Native name: Río Cabe (Spanish)

Location
- Country: Spain
- Province: Province of Lugo
- Region: Galicia

Physical characteristics
- Mouth: Sil River
  - location: Province of Lugo
  - coordinates: 42°25′26″N 7°39′45″W
  - elevation: 950 m (3,120 ft)
- Length: 56 km (35 mi)
- Basin size: 1,577 km^{2} (609 sq mi)

The Cabe is a river in the province of Lugo, Galicia (Spain), Spain, tributary of the Sil River. The river is 56 km long and flows through the municipalities of Inicio, Puebla del Brollón, Monforte de Lemos, Pantón and Sober, Lugo. It occupies an areas of 1577 hectares and has contamination problems in some spots in its southern end.

It was called "Chalibe" in the period of Ancient Rome. The fish that inhabit the river are the trout, family of the Salmonidae, the bog Leporinus obtusidens, the common carp Cyprinus carpio and some "black-bass", Micropterus salmoides floridanus, fish introduced into North American rivers called black perch.

== Course ==
The river begins in a place called "Fonte das Abellas", near the village of Cabude, the parish of Foilebar, in the municipality of Inicio. The river flows through the village of Fontes, Trascastro, Inicio and San Pedro do Incio, in the municipality of O Incio. It then enters the municipality of Puebla del Brollón and flows through the villages of Biduedo, Pacios de Veiga, Veiga, Santalla de Rey, Eixón and Fornelas.

It begins at the Saa River and enters the concello of Monforte de Lemos and flows through the villages of A Parte, O Freixo, Ribas Altas where it joins with the Mao river and enters the capital of Monfortina where it crosses a medieval bridge. The river then flows through Piñeira and Distriz in Monforte de Lemos.

It serves as a boundary between the concellos of Panton and Sober, Lugo, showering the parishes of Canaval, Vilaescura, Rosende e Anllo, of Sober, and Mañente, Vilamelle, Espasante, Cangas, Acedre and Frontón, of Pantón. It finally flows into the Sil River.

== Tributaries ==
- Antigua
- Fontán, Cebedezo
- Santa Bárbara
- San Miguel
- Picarrexo
- Saa
- Sil
- Mao
- Carabelos
- Ferreira
- Vado stream.

== Habitats ==
- Oak tree forests of Quercus robur and Quercus pyrenaica
- Chestnut tree forests of Castanea sativa
- Endemic oromediterranean scrub with gorse
- European dry scrub
- Riverbank forests with Alnus glutinosa and Fraxinus excelsior
- Pseudo-estepas with pasture of Therobrachypodietea

== Flora ==
- Festuga elegans

== Fauna ==
- Woodlark (Lullula arborea)
- European nightjar (Caprimulgus europaeus)
- Gray heron (Ardea cinerea)
- Eurasian hobby (Falco subbuteo)
- Eurasian Scops Owl (Otus scops)
- Greater horseshoe bat (Rhinolophus ferrumequinun)
- Lesser horseshoe bat (Rhinolophus hipposideros)
- Common bent-wing bat (Miniopterus schreibersi)
- Eurasian otter (Lutra lutra)
- Gold-striped salamander (Chioglossa lusitanica)
- Dragon-fly (Macromia splendens)
- Stoat (Mustela erminea)
