= A Arnoia =

- Municipality
- Coat of arms

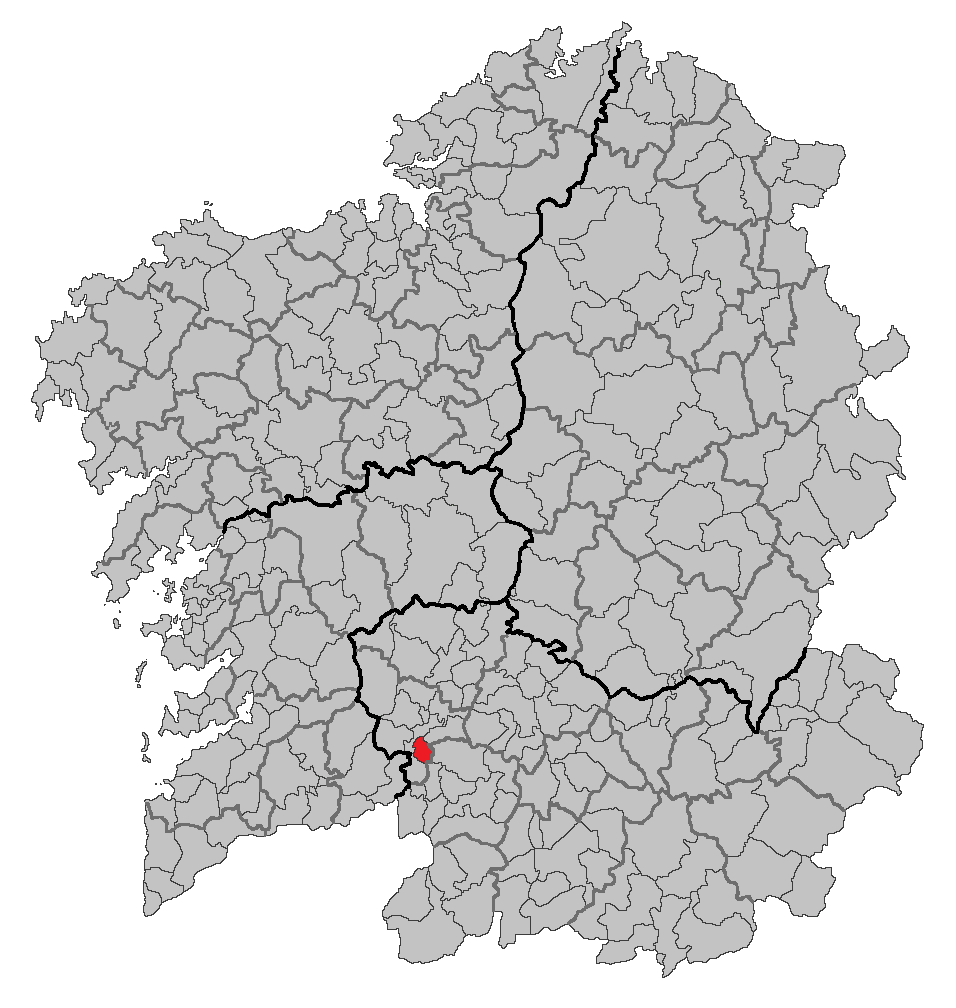
- Location in Galicia

- Location in Spain
- Coordinates: 42°15′01″N 8°07′59″W
- Country: Spain
- Autonomous community: Galicia
- Province: Ourense
- Comarca: O Ribeiro

Government
  - Type: Concello
  - Body: Concello de A Arnoia
  - Mayor: Rodrigo Aparicio Santamaría (PPdeG)

Area
  - Total: 20.69 km^{2} (7.99 sq mi)
- Elevation: 76 m (249 ft)

Population (2025-01-01)
  - Total: 949
  - Density: 45.9/km^{2} (119/sq mi)
- Time zone: UTC+1 (CET)
  - Summer (DST): UTC+2 (CEST)
- INE municipality code: 32003
- Website: www.arnoia.es

A Arnoia (in Spanish Arnoya) is a municipality in the province of Orense in the Galicia region of north-west Spain. It is located to the west of the province, by the confluence of the río Arnoia and the río Miño.

== See also ==
- Río Arnoia
