= Santa Comba, Galicia =

Santa Comba
- Municipality
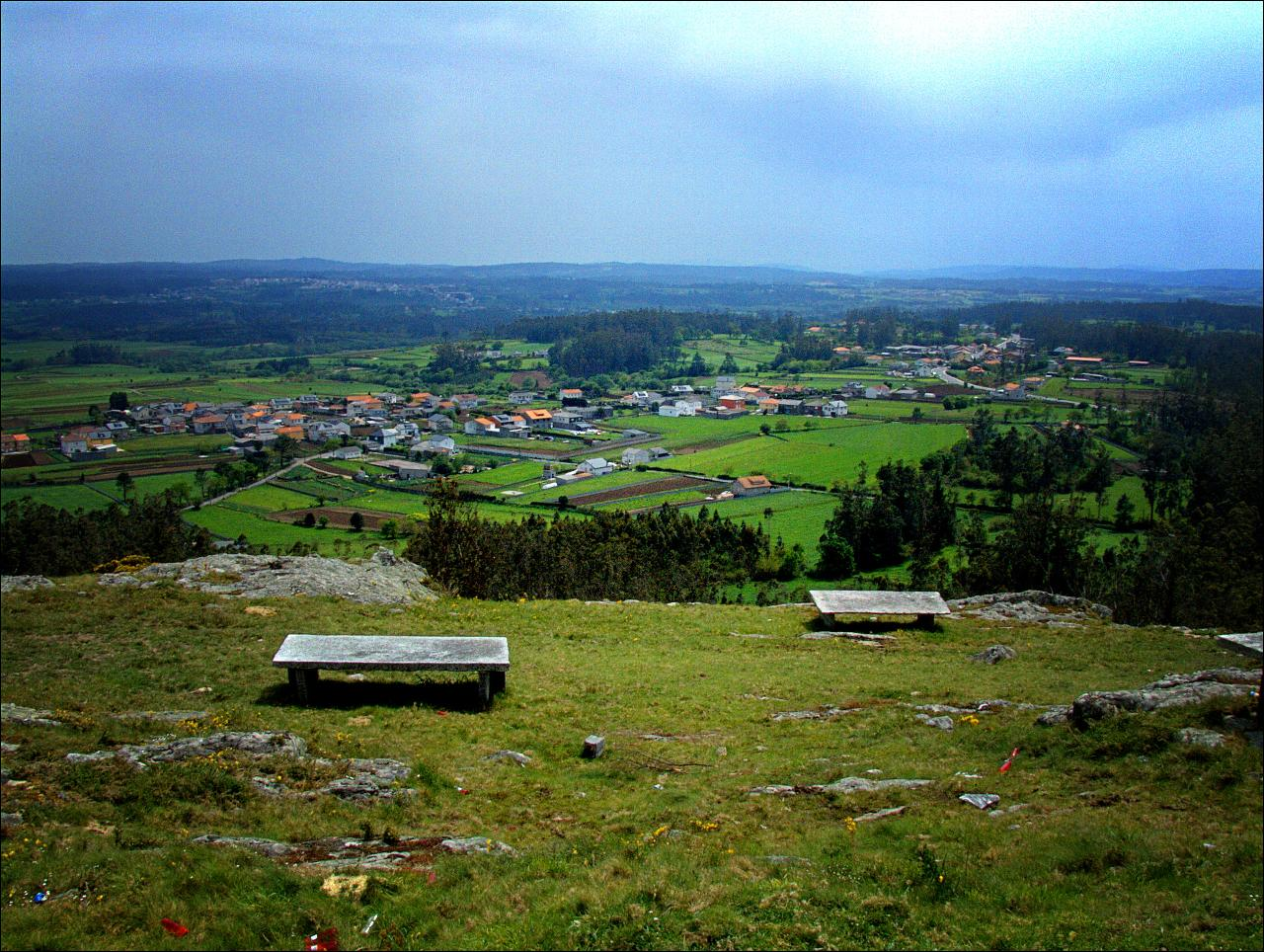

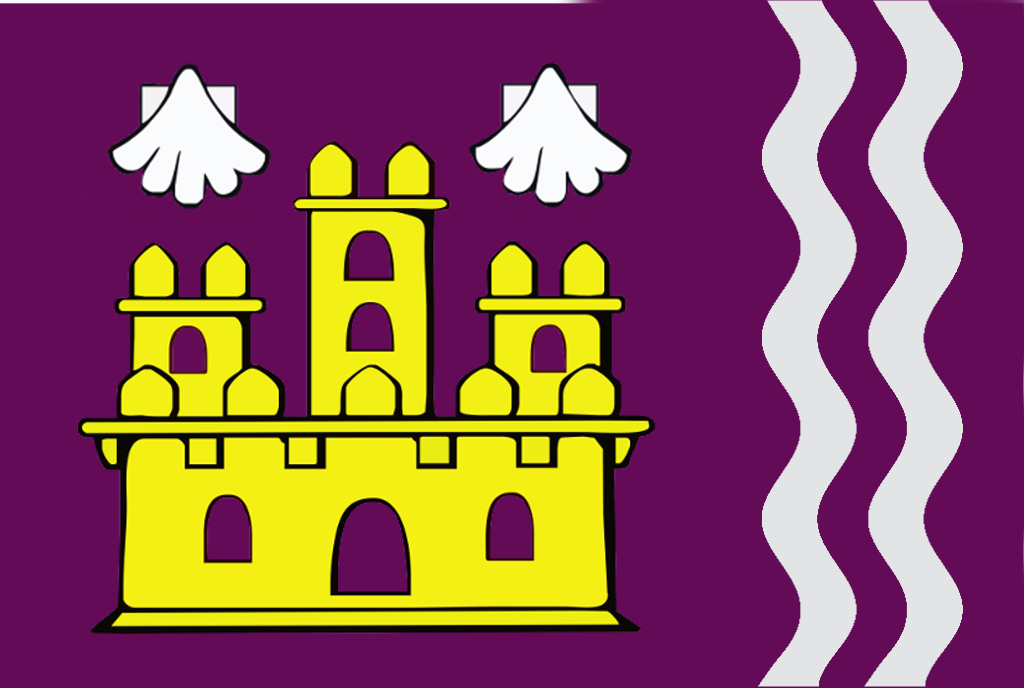
- Flag Coat of arms

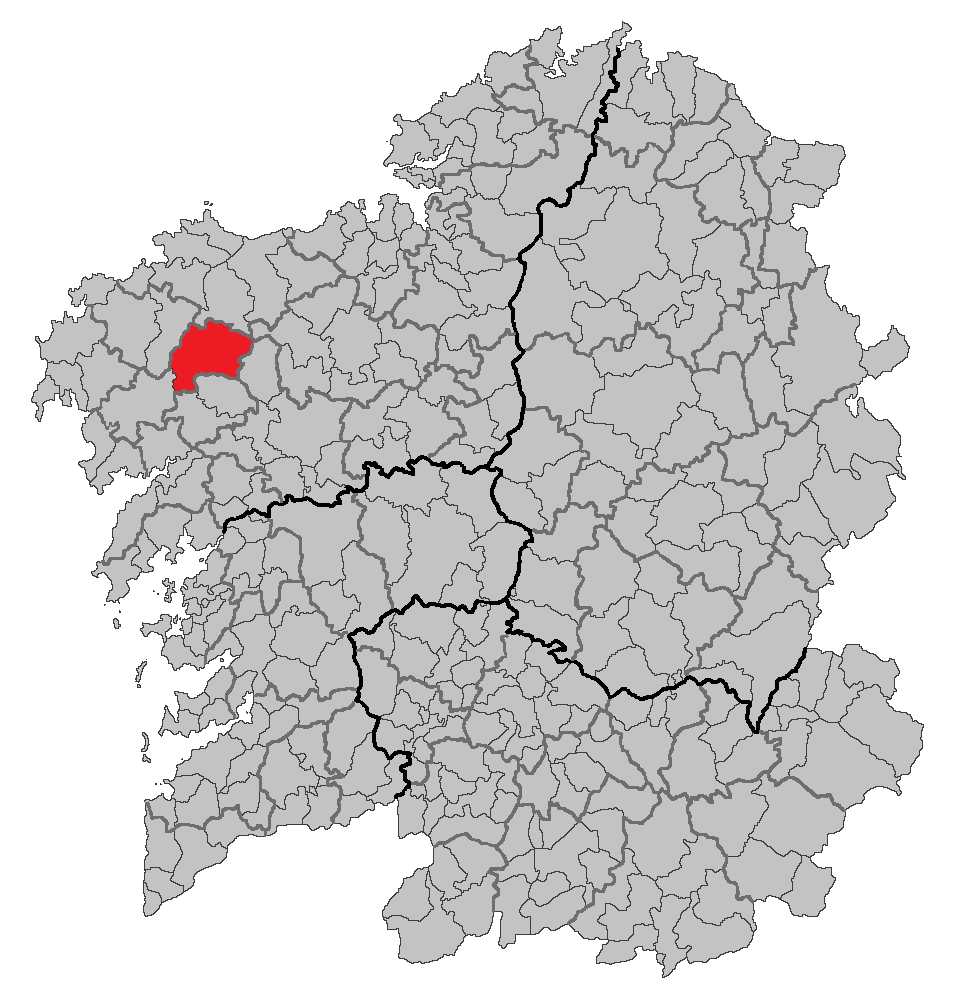
- Location of Santa Comba

- Location in Spain
- Coordinates: 43°02′18″N 08°48′51″W
- Country: Spain
- Autonomous community: Galicia
- Province: A Coruña
- Comarca: Xallas

Government
  - Alcalde: Alberto Romar Landeira (PSdeG-PSOE)

Area
  - Total: 203.70 km^{2} (78.65 sq mi)
- Elevation: 300 m (980 ft)

Population (2025-01-01)
  - Total: 9,442
  - Density: 46.35/km^{2} (120.1/sq mi)
- Demonym: Combés
- Time zone: UTC+1 (CET)
  - Summer (DST): UTC+2 (CEST)
- Postal code: 15841
- Dialing code: 981
- Website: Official website

Santa Comba is a municipality in the province of A Coruña, in the autonomous community of Galicia, northwestern Spain. It belongs to the comarca of Xallas.

== Etymology ==
The name Santa Comba is derived from Columba of Sens, a Gallaecian virgin and saint who is known as Santa Comba de Sens in the Galician language. According to the legends, she fled Gallaecia for Gaul.

== International relations ==
=== Twin towns – sister cities ===
Santa Comba is twinned with:

- Rio de Janeiro, Brazil

== See also ==
List of municipalities in A Coruña
