= Mirador de Ézaro =

Coordinates: 42.9167°N 9.1168°W

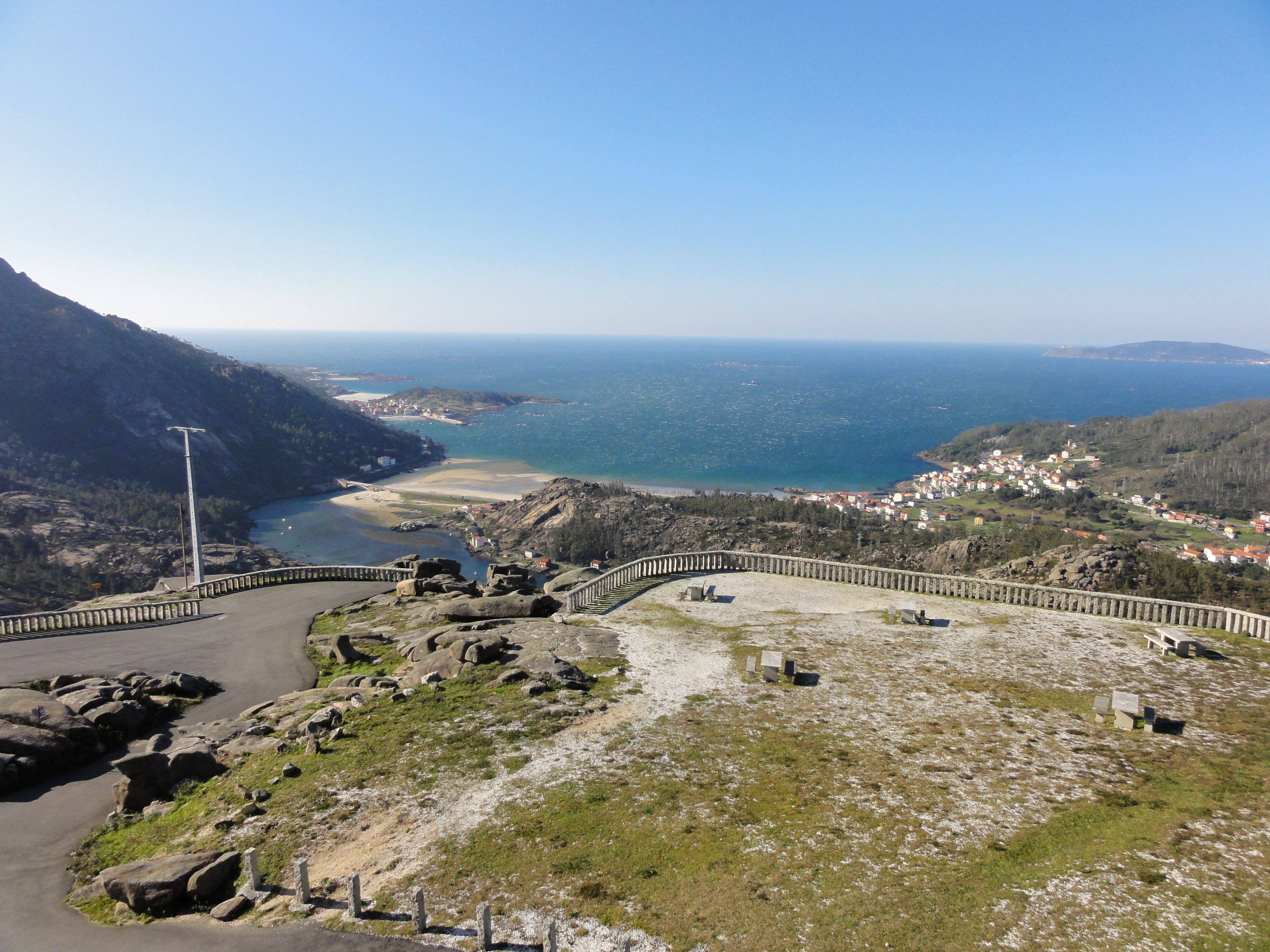
- Mirador de Ézaro
- Location: Galicia
- Gain in altitude: 264 m (866 ft)
- Length of climb: 1.8 km (1.1 mi)
- Maximum elevation: 274 m (899 ft)
- Average gradient: 14.75 %
- Maximum gradient: 28 %

Mirador de Ézaro is a steep mountain road in Galicia, near Costa da Morte, in northern Spain. This road starts in the town of Ézaro (part of Dumbría municipality) by the river Xallas, and it reaches the summit by the homonymous viewpoint. The viewpoint has a magnificent vista of the mouth of the river Xallas, the slopes of granitic Mount Pindo, the cove of O Ézaro, the small Lobeiras islands and the unmistakable shape of Cape Fisterra in the background.

It is considered a short but very demanding climb in professional road bicycle racing and is often used in the Vuelta a España stage race and UCI Gran Fondo World Series.

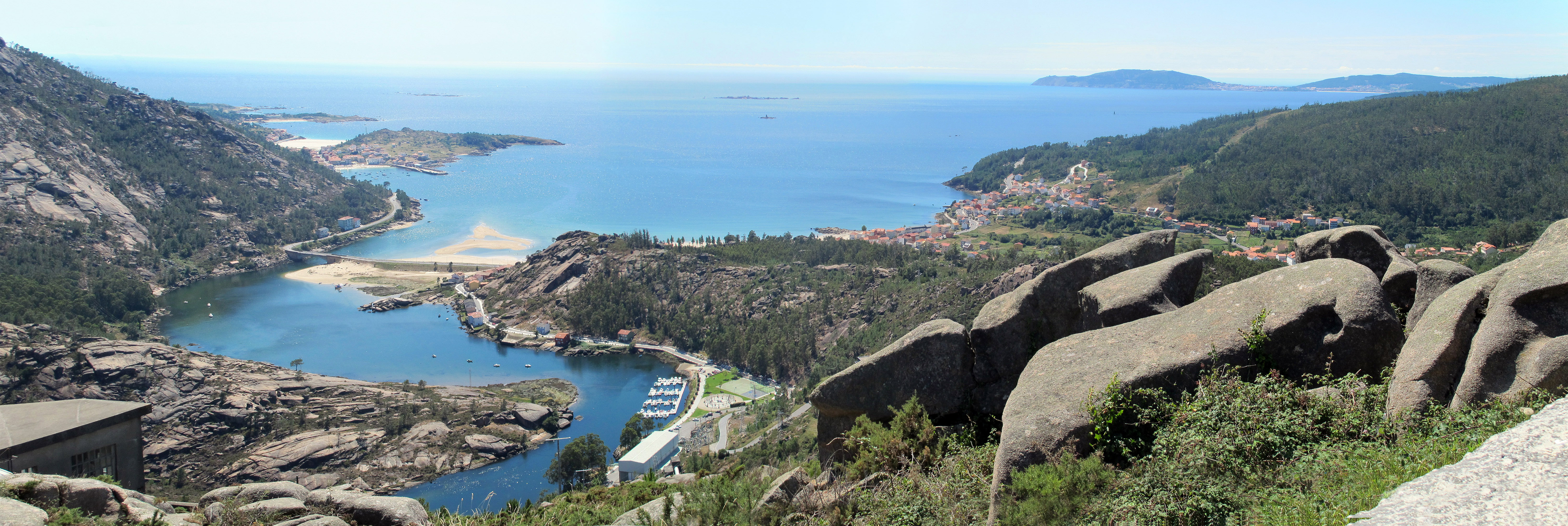
View from the viewpoint Mirador de Ézaro.

== Details of the climb ==
The top of the climb is 274 metres (899 ft) above sea level. The height difference is 264 m (866 ft). The climb is 1.8 kilometres (1.1 mi) long, an average of 14.75%. The first 1 km (0.62 mi) are an average of 14.7%. The second kilometre maintains 14.5%. The steepest part, at 28%, is 1 km (0.62 mi) from the summit. There are two later ramps at 16% to 18.

== First rider passing Mirador de Ézaro in Vuelta a España ==
Year	Stage	Rider
2012	12	Joaquim Rodríguez (ESP)
2013	4	Nicolas Edet (FRA)
2016	3	Alexandre Geniez (FRA)
2020	13	Primož Roglič (SVN)

== See also ==
- List of mountain passes
