= Muro =

Muro, a word meaning wall in the Spanish, Portuguese, Italian, Esperanto and Ido languages, may refer to:

== Places ==
=== France ===
- Muro, Haute-Corse, a commune in the département of Haute-Corse

=== Italy ===
- Muro Leccese, a municipality of the Province of Lecce, Apulia
- Muro Lucano, a municipality of the Province of Potenza, Basilicata

=== Japan ===
- Muro, Nara, (室生村; Murō-mura), a village located in Uda District, Nara Prefecture
- Muro District, Kii, (牟婁郡; Muro-gun), in Kii Province, present-day Wakayama Prefecture and Mie Prefecture

=== Spain ===
- Muro, Mallorca, a town
- Muro de Alcoy, a town in the province of Alicante
- Muros, A Coruña, a town in the province of A Coruña
- Muros (comarca), a comarca in the province of A Coruña
- Muros de Nalón, a municipality in the province of Asturias

== People ==
- Muro (DJ), hip hop artist from Tokyo
- Il Muro, Italian nickname for Walter Samuel (born 1978), Argentinian footballer
- Adrián Muro (born 1995), Mexican footballer

== Other ==
- Murō-ji, a temple on a mountain southeast of Nara, Japan.
- deviantArt Muro, an HTML5 drawing application
- Muro: Damn the Humanist Inside (Turkish: Muro: Nalet Olsun İçimdeki İnsan Sevgisine), a 2008 Turkish comedy film
- TV Muro, a television station in Belo Horizonte, Minas Gerais, Brazil

== See also ==
- Muros (disambiguation)
- Muras (disambiguation)
