= Muros =

Muros may refer to:

- Muros, A Coruña, a municipality in the province of A Coruña in the autonomous community of Galicia, Spain
- Muros, Sardinia, a comune in the province of Sassari in the region Sardini, Italy
- Muros (comarca), a comarca in the Province of A Coruña, Galicia, Spain
- Muros de Nalón, a municipality in the autonomous community of Asturias, Spain
- Muros de Nalón (parish), a parish in the municipality if Muros de Nalón, Asturias, Spain
- Muros (Pravia), a parish in the municipality if Pravia, Asturias, Spain
- Muros (Encantadia), a fictional character from the Philippine telefantasyes Encantadia and Etheria
- Cuernavaca#Museo Muros, an art museum in Cuernavaca, Mexico

== See also ==
- Muro (disambiguation)
- Muras (disambiguation)
