= Ézaro =

Coordinates: 42°54′43″N 9°07′57″W

O Ézaro (Santa Uxía)
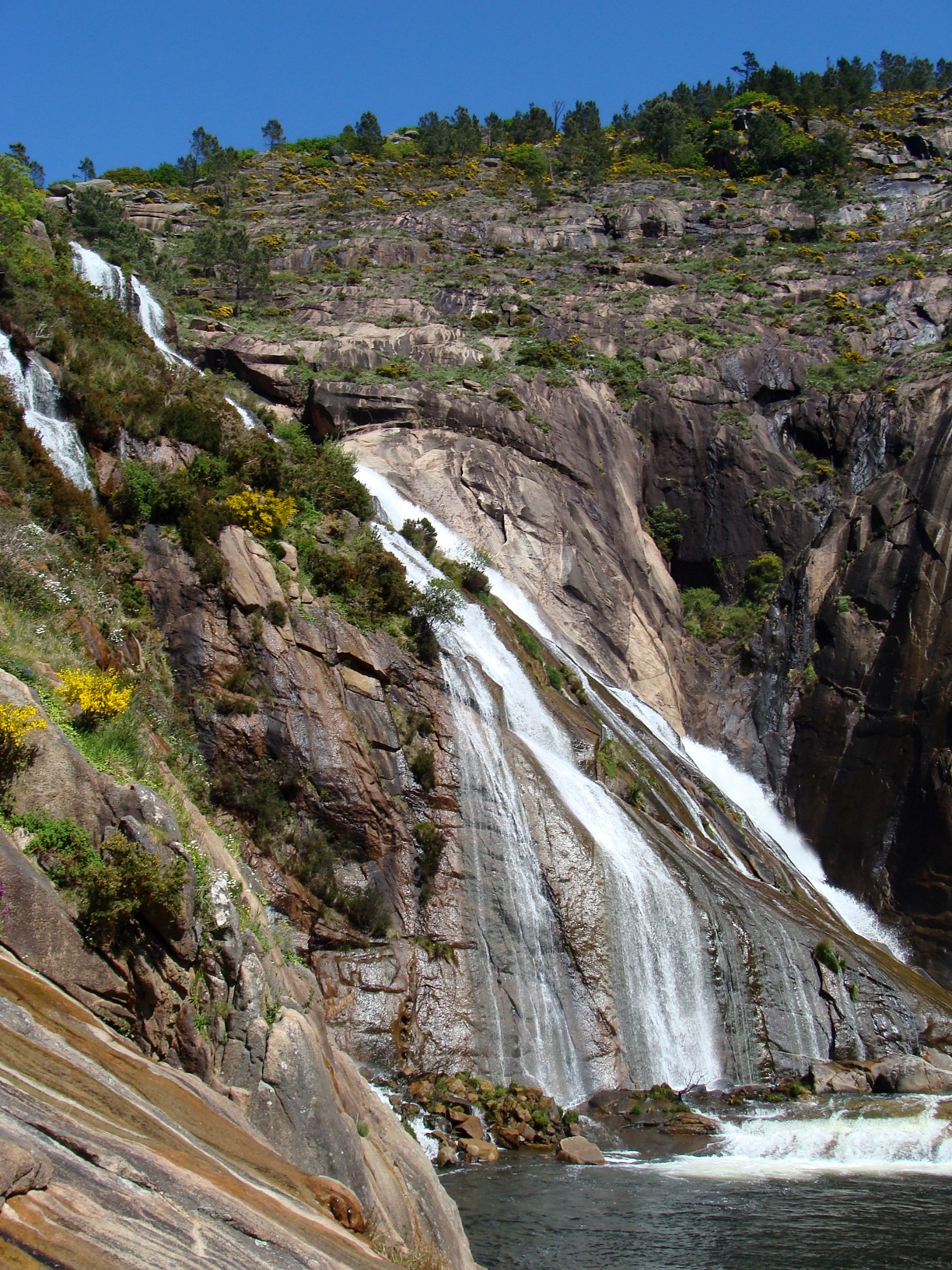
- Nickname: Ézaro
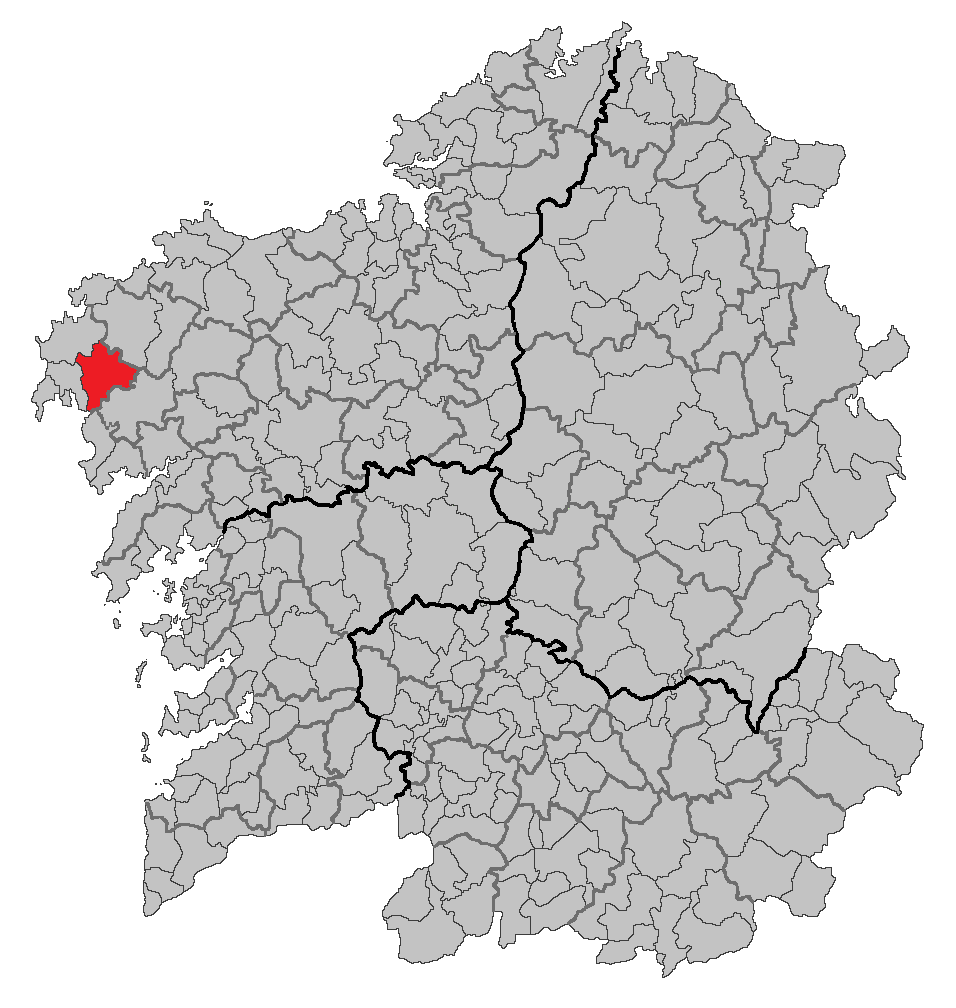
- Location of Dumbría municipality (which Ézaro is part of) within Galicia

Government
  - Alcalde (Mayor): José Manuel Pequeño Castro (Municipality of Dumbría)

Area
  - Total: 13.2 km^{2} (5.1 sq mi)

Population (2019)
  - Total: 600
- Time zone: UTC+1 (CET)
  - Summer (DST): UTC+2 (CEST)

Ézaro (officially known as O Ézaro (Santa Uxía)) is a parish part of the municipality of Dumbría, in the province of A Coruña, in the autonomous community of Galicia of northwestern Spain. It belongs to the comarca of Fisterra. It had a population of 600 inhabitants in 2019.

== Geography ==
It is the only parish of the Dumbría municipality bordering the sea, the Atlantic Ocean. It is 100 kilometres away from A Coruña and it is located in the region called Costa da Morte.

The area of the parish is 13.2 km². It is crossed by the river Xallas, which flows into the sea in the waterfall called Fervenza do Ézaro. Nowadays the water flows permanently by the waterfall, while years ago it only happened during weekends (when the floodgates of the upstream dam were opened). Near the waterfall, it is located the Museum of the Electricity and the start of the road climb to Mirador de Ézaro .

The main urban area has a landscaped promenade bordering its blue flag-awarded beach of fine sand called Praia do Ézaro.

== Populated entities ==
Related hamlets within this parish:

- Cancelo, O
- Castelo, O
- Covas, As
- Estrada, A
- Ézaro, O
- Finsín
- Lagoelas, As
- Laxe, A
- Lombiño, O
- Pena, A
- Río do Barco
- San Crimenzo
- Santa Uxía
- Santo, O

== Demography ==
Historical population

Year	Pop.	±%
2000	1,077	—
2001	1,066	−1.0%
2002	1,055	−1.0%
2003	1,023	−3.0%
2004	985	−3.7%
2005	951	−3.5%
2006	924	−2.8%

Year	Pop.	±%
2007	906	−1.9%
2008	881	−2.8%
2009	852	−3.3%
2010	842	−1.2%
2011	836	−0.7%
2012	693	−17.1%
2013	672	−3.0%

Year	Pop.	±%
2014	652	−3.0%
2015	631	−3.2%
2016	636	+0.8%
2017	625	−1.7%
2018	625	+0.0%
2019	600	−4.0%

Source: INE Archiv

== Festivals ==
Its Summer Festival (A festa da praia) is celebrated in August.

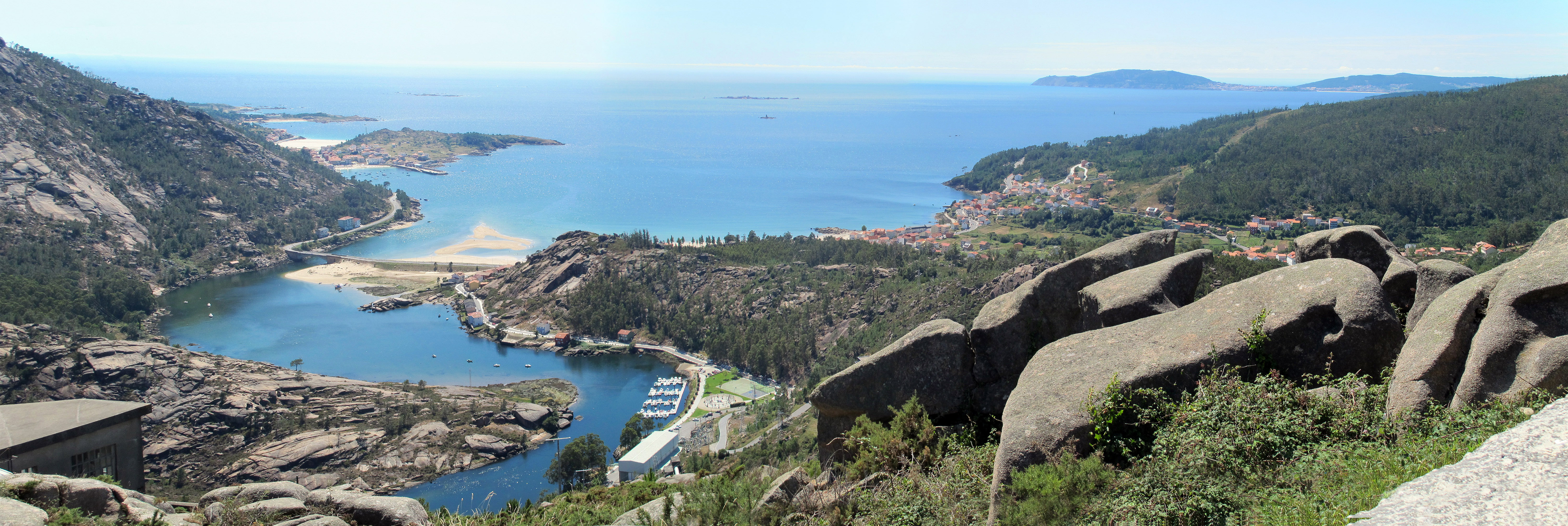
View from the viewpoint Mirador de Ézaro.
