= Carnota =

Place in Spain

- Municipality
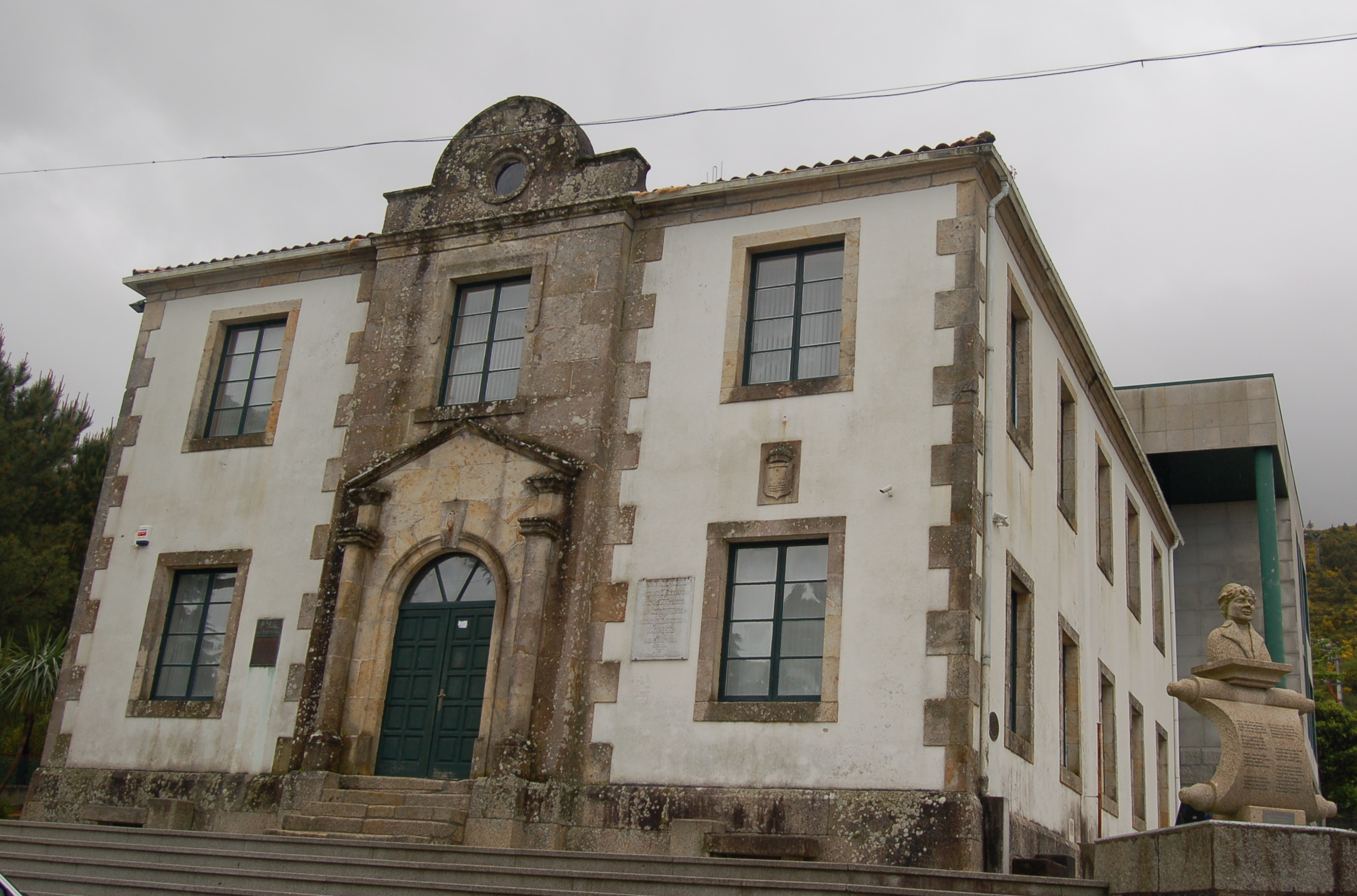

- Flag Coat of arms

- Location within Province of A Coruña Location within Spain
- Coordinates: 42°49′16″N 9°5′14″W
- Country: Spain
- Autonomous community: Galicia
- Province: A Coruña
- Comarca: Muros

Government
  - Alcalde (Mayor): Ramón Noceda Caamaño (BNG)

Population (2025-01-01)
  - Total: 3,780
- Time zone: UTC+1 (CET)
  - Summer (DST): UTC+2 (CEST)
- Website: www.concellodecarnota.com

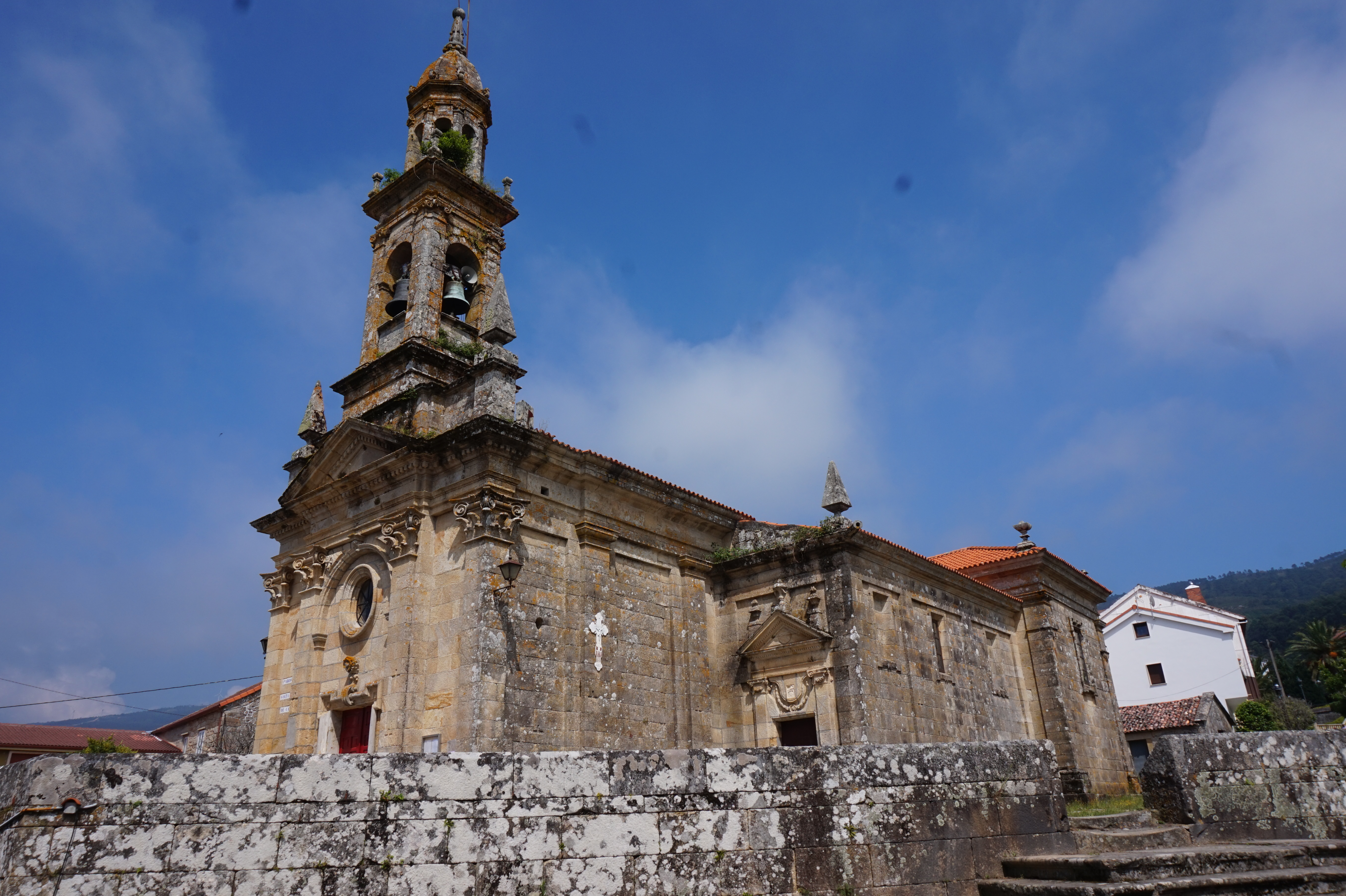
Igrexa de Santa Comba

Carnota is a municipality in the province of A Coruña, in the autonomous community of Galicia, northwestern Spain. It belongs to the comarca of Muros. It has an area of 66.4km^{2} and a population of 3,780 (2025).

It is famed for its majestic hórreo granary, the largest in the world. It has a Baroque style and dates back to 1768. Carnota is also known for its beach that measures over 7km, the longest in the region of Galicia. The location is also home to Mount Pindo.

== Borders ==
The municipality of Carnota borders on the north with the municipality of Dumbría, the northwest with Mazaricos, the west by the Atlantic, and south Muros. It includes various small villages such as O Pindo, Quilmas, A Curra, Panches, Caldebarcos, Vadebois, San Cibran, Vilar de Parada, Fetos, Louredo O viso, Pedrafigueria, Sofan, Mallou, Carballal, Lira, and several more.

== Etymology ==
Its name could come from the pre-Celtic word carn, which means stone.

== History ==
There tombs and forts indicating that the area has been inhabited since antiquity. In the Middle Ages it belonged to the Counts of Trastámara and Lemos and was part of the old county of Cornatum. With the Great Irmandiña War of 1467 disappeared strengths. The location of the capital, Carnota, originated in the 17th century. In the 19th century, it was sacked by the French in the War of Spanish Independence.

== See also ==
List of municipalities in A Coruña
