= Castle of Saint George (Galicia) =

Ruined castle in Galicia, Spain

- Castelo de San Xurxo
- Carnota, A Coruña in Spain
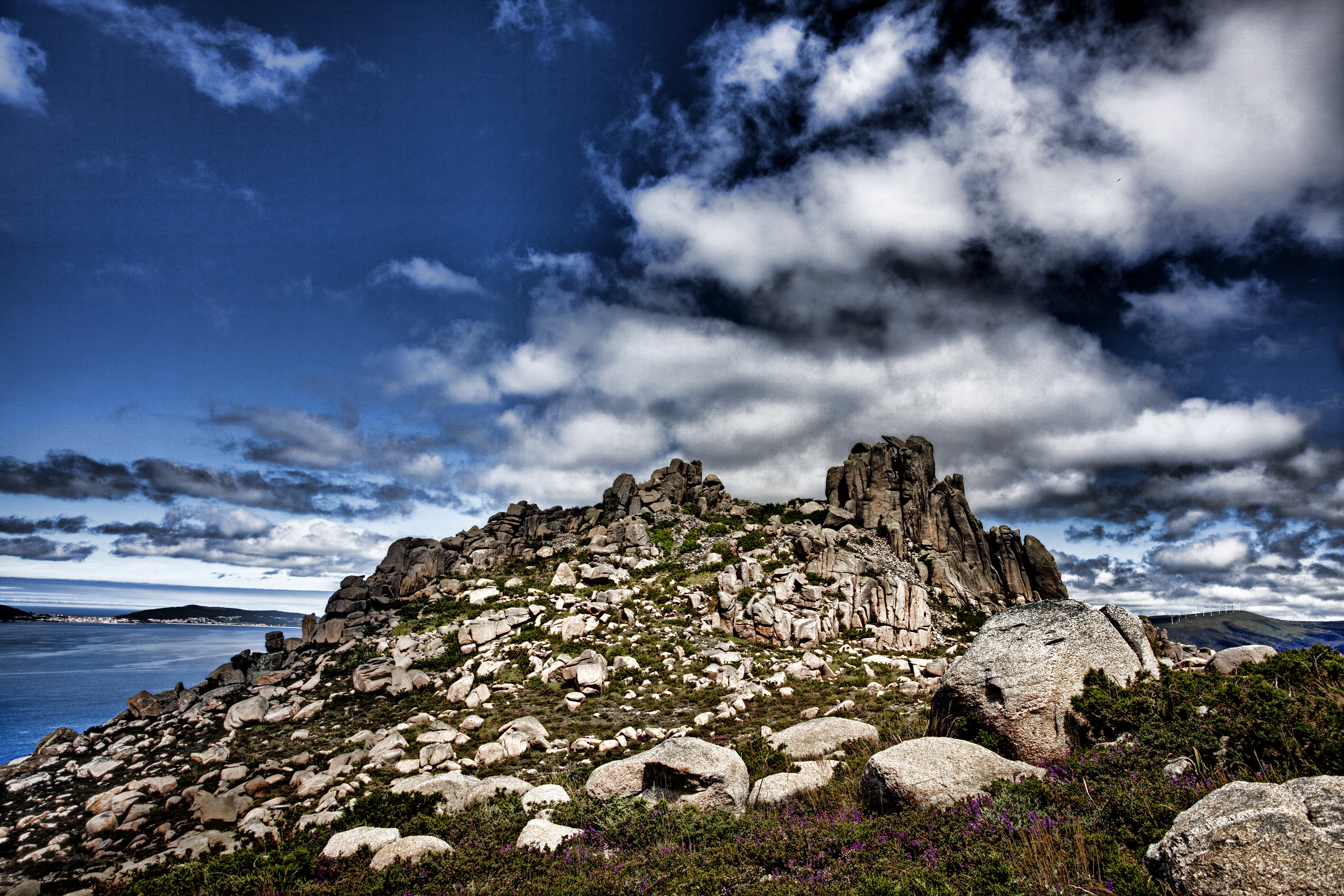
- Ruins of Castle of Saint George

Location
- Coordinates: 42.878723°N 9.132772°W

The Castle of Saint George was a medieval fortress located in the granite massif of Mount Pindo, in Carnota.

== History ==
The buildings stood for a good part of the Middle Ages, after being founded (or refounded) in the 10th century (at the time of the Western Towers) by the bishop Sisnando II, as part of his strategy of fortifying the Galician coast against the continuous Norman and Arab attacks and looting from the sea, also defending at this point an important path to Santiago de Compostela, a coveted economic and religious center of the time. That is why it is considered one of the oldest stone castles of Galicia, and of the few that could never have been conquered, that is known.

The fortification was located on Pico Pedrullo, a steep cliff 300 meters (980 ft) high located on the coast of Carnota near the site of Quilmas, a spectacular natural geological formation with which they melted the walls of the fortress themselves, creating a complex that was very difficult to access. Consisting of several watchtowers and a tribute tower, it offered a fantastic perspective on the southern coast of the Costa da Morte allowing them to monitor the waters located between Cabo Touriñán and Cabo Corrubedo.

After passing alternately through the hands of the Crown, church and nobles of the time, and after featuring prominently in the Carnota Revolt, little by little this fortress lost importance as the centers of power settled in the area around Santiago de Compostela from the thirteenth century, until finally at the beginning of the fourteenth century the noble Lope Sánchez de Ulloa, who at that time held the castle's title, asked the Church for permission to demolish the fortification:

And you have knowledge that Lope Sanchez de Vlloa gave to Archbishop Don Rodrigo about dismantling the house of Saint George

Unlike the neighboring Peñafiel Castle, the castle must have already been destroyed at the time of the Irmandiño revolts, which is confirmed by the absence of any reference to this fortification in medieval documentation that is preserved about this event.

Over the centuries, the ruins of the castle became part of local legends and oral tradition, which placed among its rubble the treasures of the tomb of Queen Lupa. These legends caused that its remains were successively desecrated and removed in search of treasures and remains, causing that today the structures of the castle (which in the middle of the 20th century still stood several meters high) were reduced to an immense pile of rubble and the bases of some walls. Archaeological excavations have never been carried out on its remains.

== Gallery ==
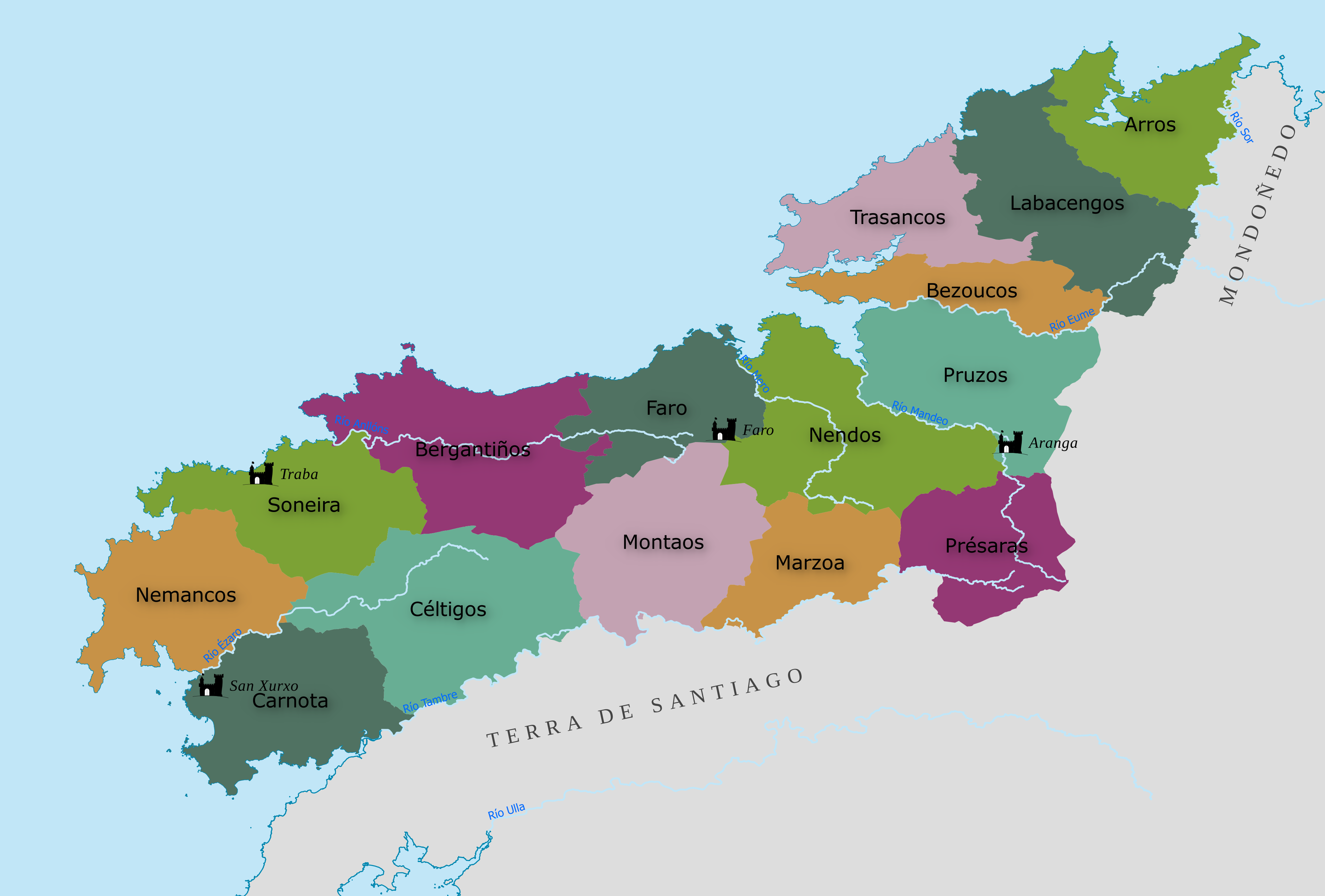
10th century map of the castle of Saint George in Carnota

=== See also ===
- Castros (Spain)
- List of castros in Galicia
- Iron Age Europe
- Castro culture
