= San Vicenzo de Duio =

Saint Vincent of Duio San Vicenzo de Duio
- Parish
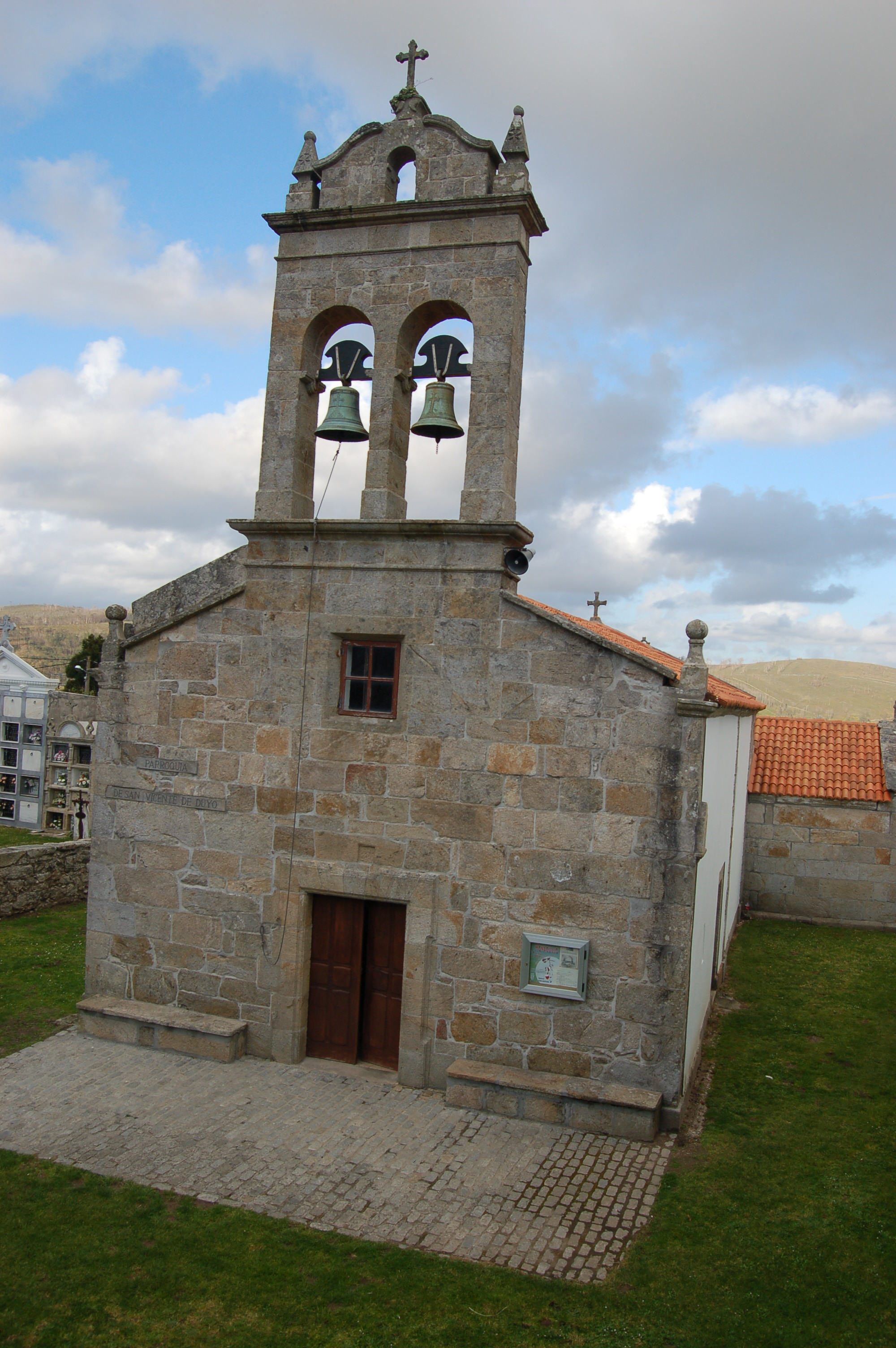
- Church of Saint Vincent of Duio
- Interactive map of Saint Vincent of Duio
- Coordinates: 42.93194444°N 9.27972222°W
- Municipality: Fisterra
- Province: A Coruña

San Vicenzo de Duio is a parish located in the south of the municipality of Fisterra.

== Background ==
Construction on the church began in 1669 at the foot of a fort. Baroque in style, it was looted during the Napoleonic invasion and a fire destroyed the parish archives. It was rebuilt in the 19th century.

It has a hall plan with a large rectangular presbytery and a single nave, divided into four sections. The facade ends with a belfry built in 1863. In the main chapel stands out a large altarpiece, presided over by the image of San Vicenzo, the patron saint of the parish of Duio.

The eighth stage of the Way of the Lighthouses hiking route passes through this parish.

== See also ==
- Locations in Fisterra
