= Fisterra =

- Municipality
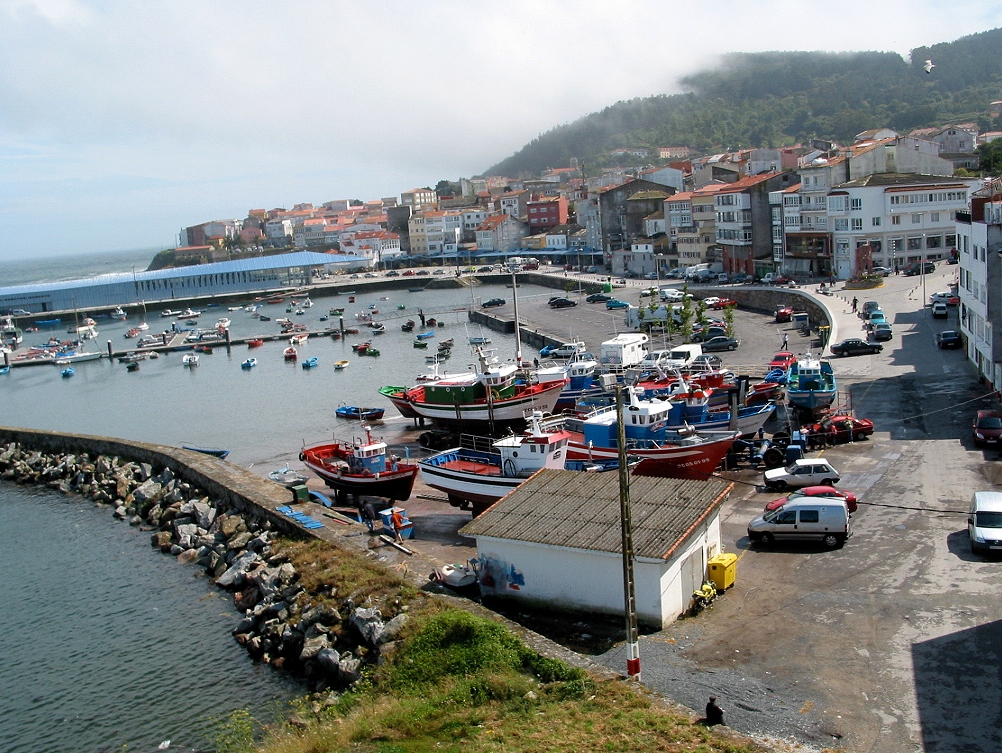

- Coat of arms

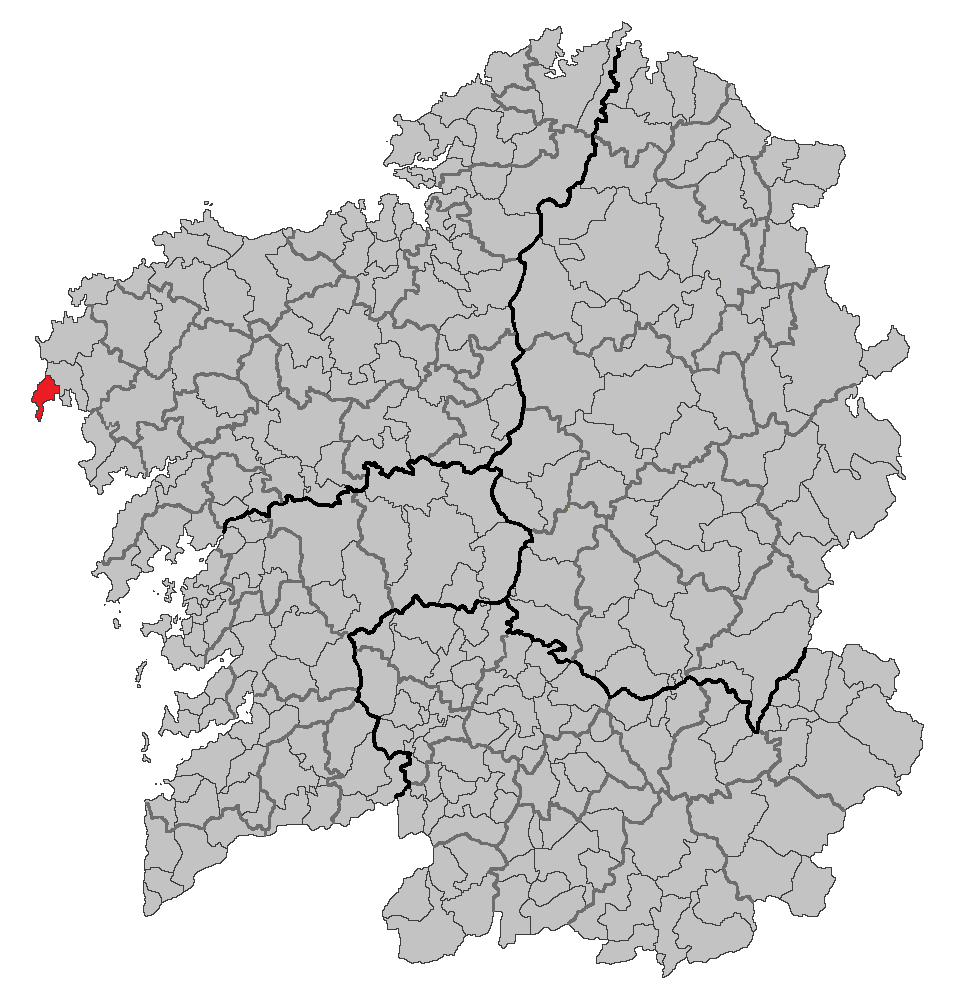

- Location in Spain
- Coordinates: 42°54′N 9°15′W
- Country: Spain
- Autonomous community: Galicia
- Province: A Coruña
- Comarca: Fisterra

Government
  - Mayor: Áurea Domínguez Sisto

Area
  - Total: 29.43 km^{2} (11.36 sq mi)

Population (2025-01-01)
  - Total: 4,666
  - Density: 158.5/km^{2} (410.6/sq mi)
- Demonym(s): fisterrán, -á
- Time zone: UTC+1 (CET)
  - Summer (DST): UTC+2 (CEST)
- Postal code: 15155
- Dialing code: 981
- Website: Official website

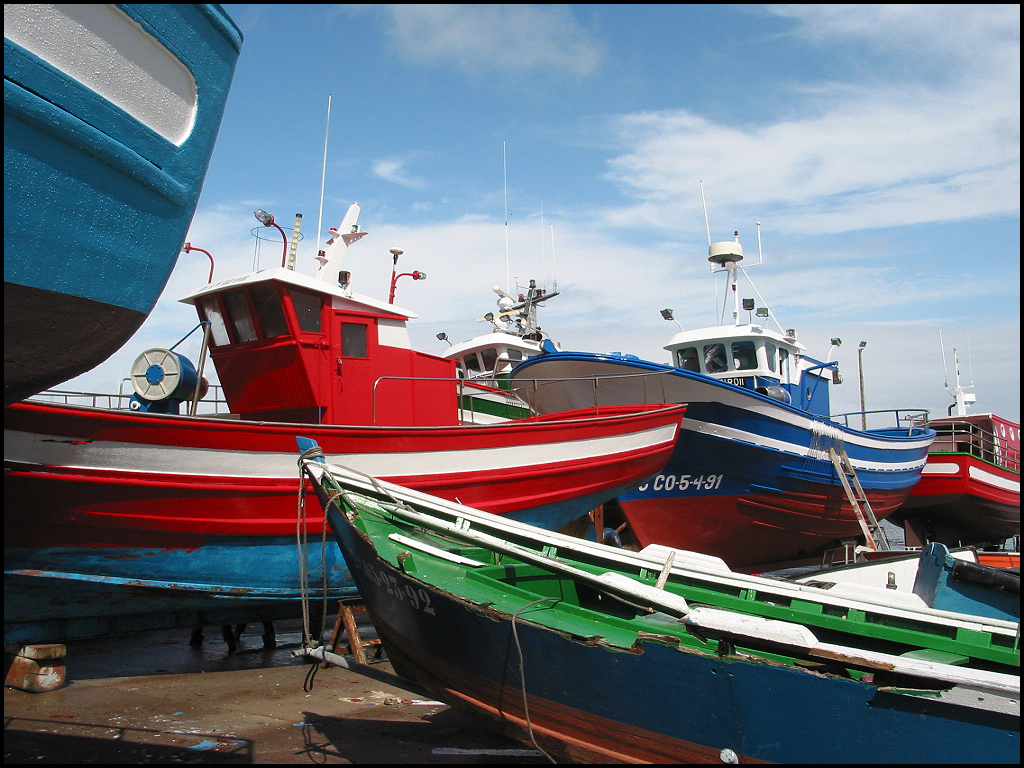
Ships in the port

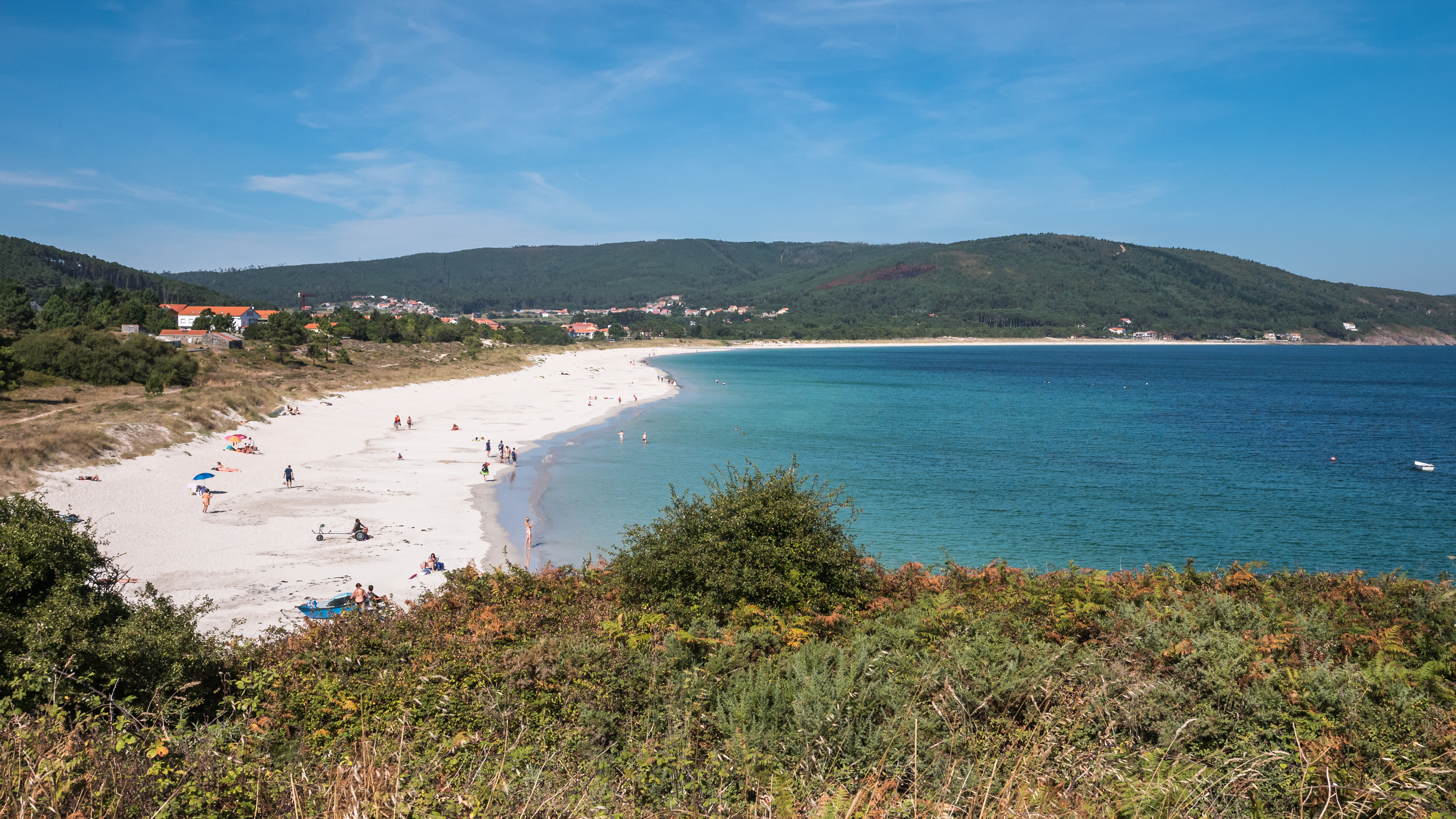
Langosteira beach

Fisterra (Galician pronunciation: [fisˈtɛrɐ]; Spanish: Finisterre [finisˈtere]) is a municipality in the province of A Coruña, in the autonomous community of Galicia, Spain. It belongs to the comarca of Fisterra. Fisterra is on Cape Finisterre, an alternative final destination for pilgrims on the Way of St. James who seek to travel beyond Santiago de Compostela.

Fisterra is on the rocky Costa da Morte (Galician: "Coast of Death"), named because of the large number of shipwrecks along these shores. The name Fisterra comes from Latin FINIS TERRAE, meaning "Land's End". This name stems from the fact that this area is on a remote peninsula that is one of the westernmost points of land in Galicia, and hence in Spain.

Fisterra is an ancient port and fishing village, formed by narrow streets leading to the Plaza de Ara Solis. The chapel of Nosa Señora do Bon Suceso, dating from the 18th century, is on the plaza. There is a lighthouse on a 600-metre promontory called "Monte Facho" at the tip of Cape Finisterre overlooking the Atlantic Ocean. On the road up to the lighthouse is the parish church of Santa María de Fisterra which contains the Chapel of Santo Cristo.

Fisterra is 108 km from A Coruña, and 98 km from Santiago de Compostela.

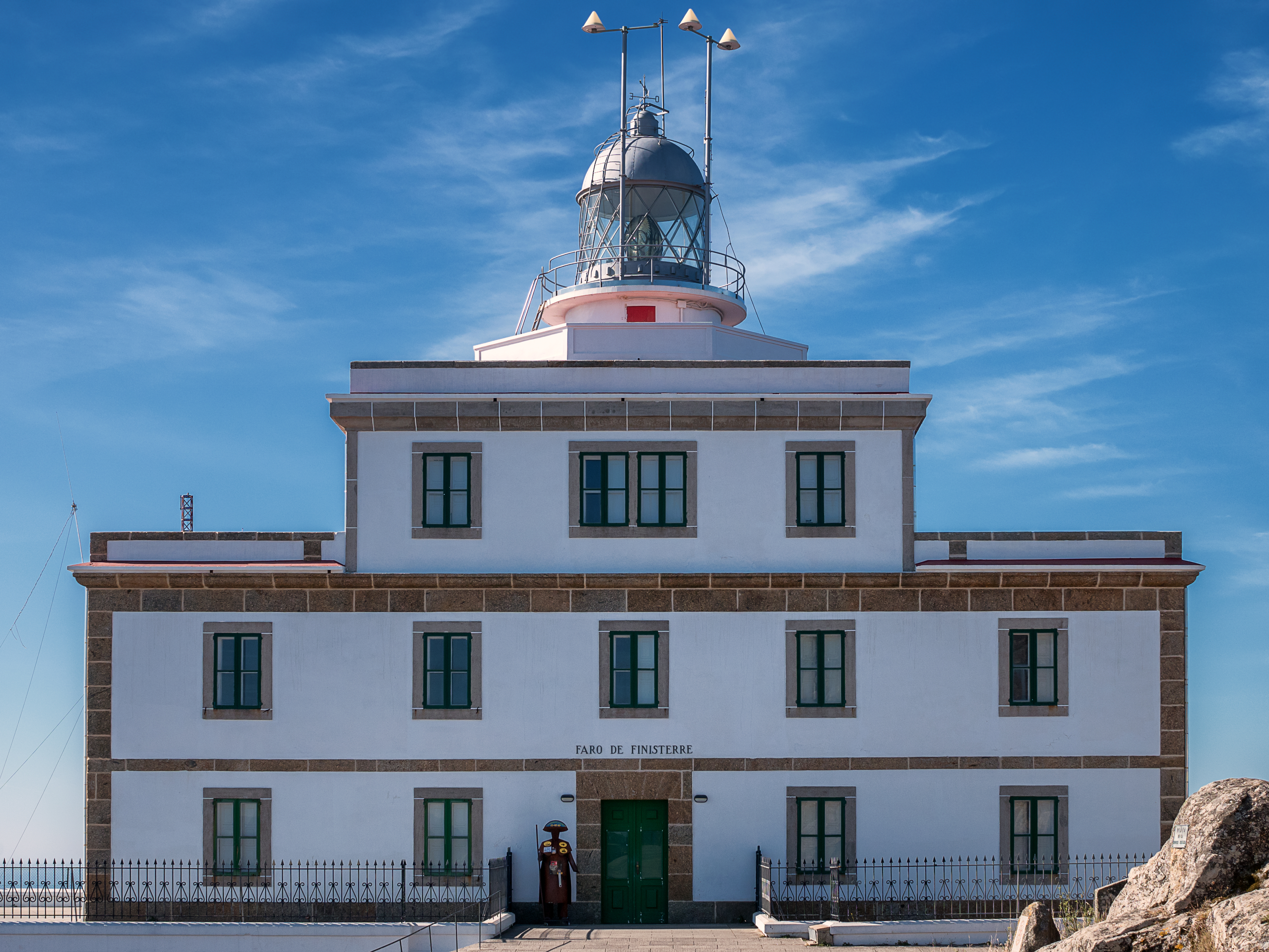
Fisterra Lighthouse

== Geography ==
Fisterra has several beaches like O Rostro, Arnela, Mar de Fóra, Langosteira, Ribeira, and Corveiro.

There are several rocks in this area associated with religious legends, such as the "holy stones", the "stained wine stones", the "stone chair", and the tomb of Orcabella.

== History ==
After the discovery of the remains of St. James, pilgrims on the Way of St. James started to arrive from Santiago to Fisterra to worship in front of an image of Sacred Christ, view the relics of San Guillerme, and see the "End of the Earth".

In 1479, a hospital to accommodate the arriving pilgrims was built. Many of the pilgrims were noblemen or otherwise famous.

Thousands of visitors continue to arrive in Fisterra every day.

== Pre-Christian beliefs ==
In the area there are many remnants of pre-Christian beliefs and sacred locations. On Cape Finisterre, some claim that there is the "Altar Soli", where the Celts engaged in sun worship and assorted rituals.

The Monte Facho, on Cape Finisterre, was the place where the Celtic Nerios from Duio carried out their offerings and rites in honour of the sun. St. William of Gellone also lived in a house located there. Near St. William's house, sterile couples would have sexual intercourse on one specific stone to try to conceive, following a Celtic rite of fertility.

== Main sights ==
- Castle of San Carlos, built during the reign of Charles III of Spain.
- Church of Santa María das Areas (late 12th century, modified later). It houses the image of the Holy Christ of Fisterra.
- Bon Suceso Chapel (18th century)
- Fisterra Lighthouse, the main on the Costa da Morte.

== Culture ==
During easter there is a local festival featuring the Christ of the Golden Beard.

== Civil parishes ==
- Duio
- Fisterra (Santa María)
- San Martiño de Duio (San Martiño)
- Sardiñeiro (San Xoán)

== Demography ==
From:INE Archiv

== See also ==
List of municipalities in A Coruña
