= Muras =

Muras may refer to:

- Muras, Galicia, a municipality in the province of Lugo, Galicia, Spain
- Muras people, an indigenous people of South America

== See also ==
- Muro (disambiguation)
- Muros (disambiguation)
