= Church of Santa María das Areas =

Parochial temple in Fisterra, Galicia

Coordinates: 42°54′5″N 9°15′50″W

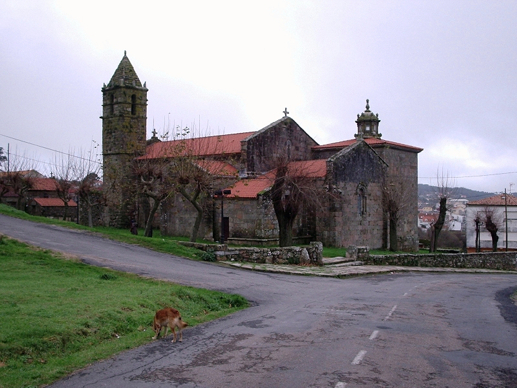

Igrexa de Santa María das Areas is a church in Fisterra, Province of A Coruña, Galicia, Spain. It was declared Bien de Interés Cultural in 1985. This Romanesque temple was founded around the 12th century.

== History ==
It is possibly located on an old castro. Its foundation is attributed to Urraca Fernández, daughter of the Count of Traba, who in 1199 wrote a deed of donation indicating V. modios de pane et tertian vacarum mearum de montealto. Ad opus ecclesie Ste. Marie de finibus terre, (Five bushels of bread and a third of my cows from Montealto. For the work of the church of St. Mary at the ends of the earth).

The complex was built in two stages: the first one being the 12th century Romanesque central nave and the second 14th~15th century Gothic elements added such as Our Lady of Mount Carmel's chapel, the high altar and the baptistery, with ribbed vaults.

As a mixed temple, it lacks the usual shape of pilgrimage churches (owning the lack of ambulatory), given that the nearby hermitage was at some point site of Jacobean cult.

== Building ==
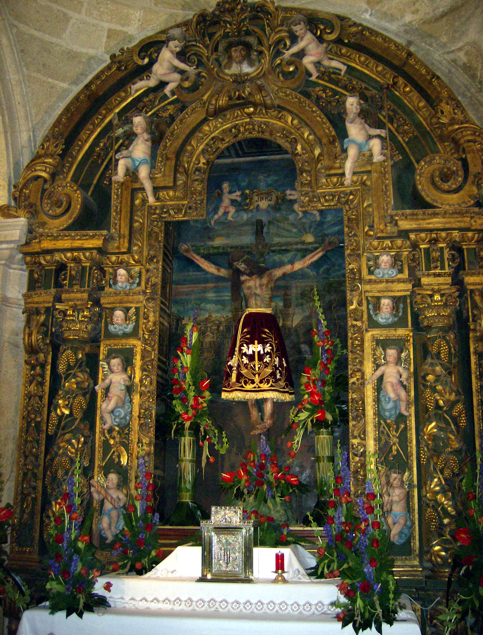
Altarpiece of Christ

The church is made with local granite. It has a central nave, oriented towards the west, covered by a wooden roof and local red tiles, with powerful buttresses and few bays, typical of the Romanesque. The nave is preceded by a narthex with Gothic characteristics, with a staircase to access the bell tower, with a pyramidal roof and a square plan.
