= Fisterra (comarca) =

Coordinates: 42.9667°N 9.21667°W

- Comarca
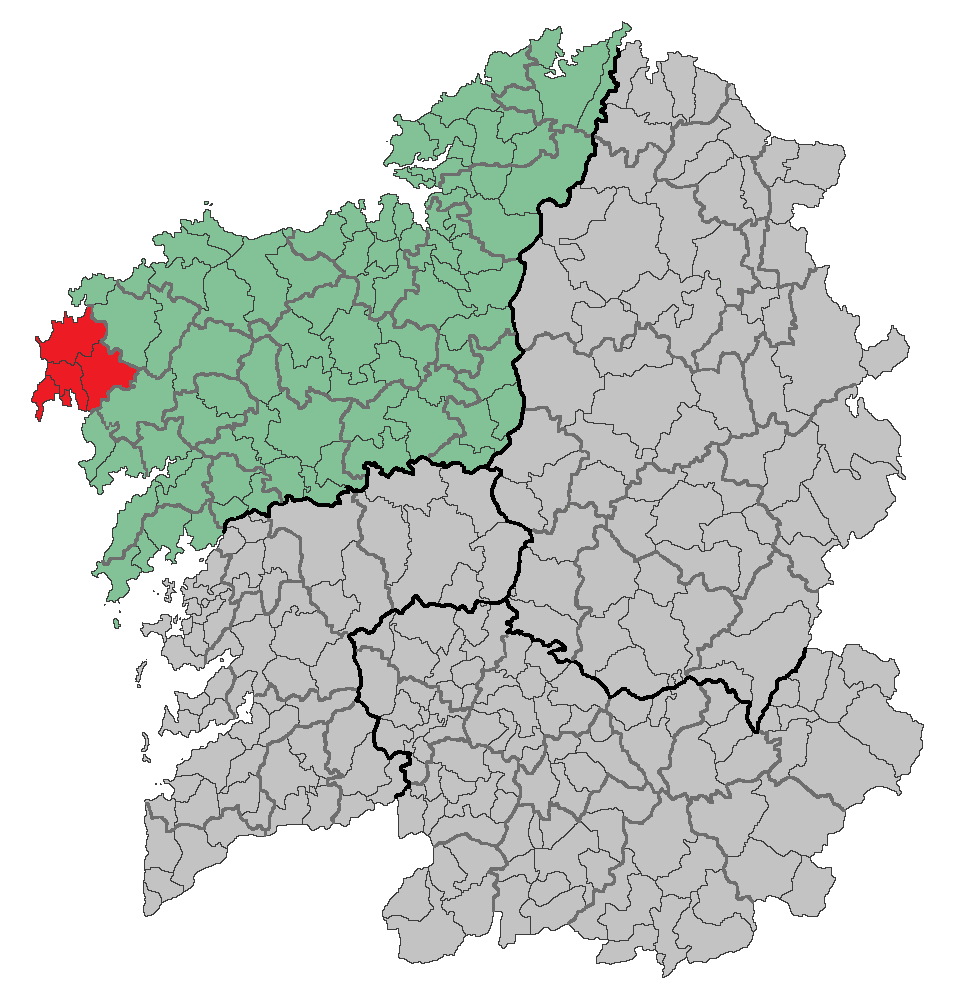
- Country: Spain
- Autonomous community: Galicia
- Province: A Coruña
- Capital: Fisterra
- Municipalities: List: Cee, Corcubión, Dumbría, Fisterra, Muxía

Area
  - Total: 336.9 km^{2} (130.1 sq mi)

Population (2019)
  - Total: 21,483
  - Density: 63.77/km^{2} (165.2/sq mi)
- Demonym: Finisterrano
- Time zone: UTC+1 (CET)
  - Summer (DST): UTC+2 (CEST)

Fisterra is a comarca in the Galician Province of A Coruña. The overall population of this local region is 21,483 (2019).

== Municipalities ==
Cee, Corcubión, Dumbría, Fisterra and Muxía.
