= Muros (comarca) =

Coordinates: 43°05′50″N 8°29′52″W

- Comarca
- Flag Coat of arms
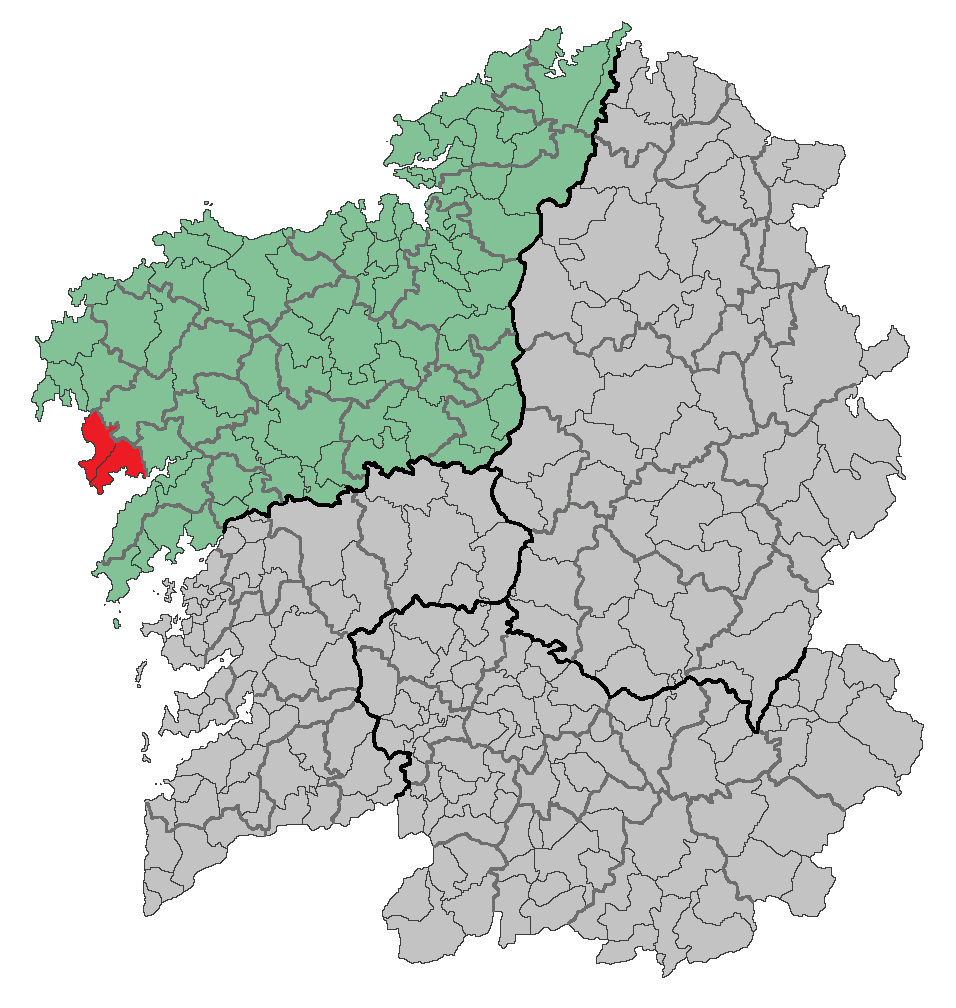
- Country: Spain
- Autonomous community: Galicia
- Province: A Coruña
- Capital: Muros
- Municipalities: List: Carnota, Muros

Area
  - Total: 138.9 km^{2} (53.6 sq mi)

Population (2019)
  - Total: 12,513
  - Density: 90.09/km^{2} (233.3/sq mi)
- Demonym: Muradano
- Time zone: UTC+1 (CET)
  - Summer (DST): UTC+2 (CEST)

Muros is a comarca in the Galician Province of A Coruña. The overall population of this local region is 12,513 (2019).

== Municipalities ==
Carnota and Muros
