= Xallas (river) =

River in Spain

Coordinates: 42°54′N 9°07′W

Xallas river
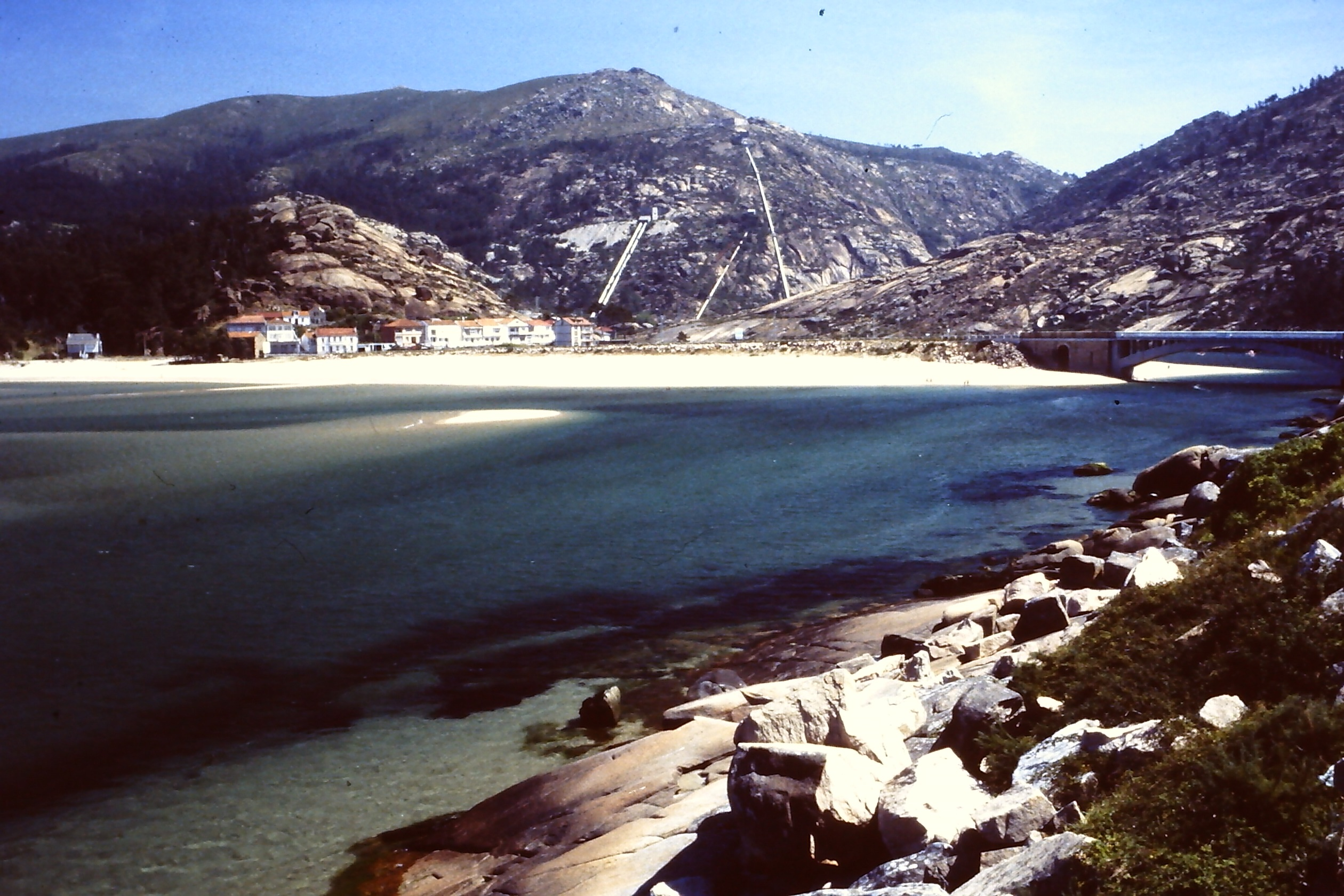

Physical characteristics
- Source
  - location: Monte Castelo, Coristanco
  - elevation: 380 m (1,250 ft)
- Mouth
  - location: Atlantic Ocean
  - elevation: 0 m (0 ft)
- Length: 57 km (35 mi)

The Xallas is a river originating in smaller tributaries in Galicia, Spain close to Xallas.

The river passes by close to Santa Comba and flows through several barrier lakes (Fervenz, Ponte Olveira, Castrelo, Santa Uxia). The river flows into the Atlantic Ocean close to the town of Ézaro.

== See also ==
- List of rivers of Spain
- Rivers of Galicia
