= Dumbría =

Coordinates: 43°00′N 9°07′W

Concello de Dumbría
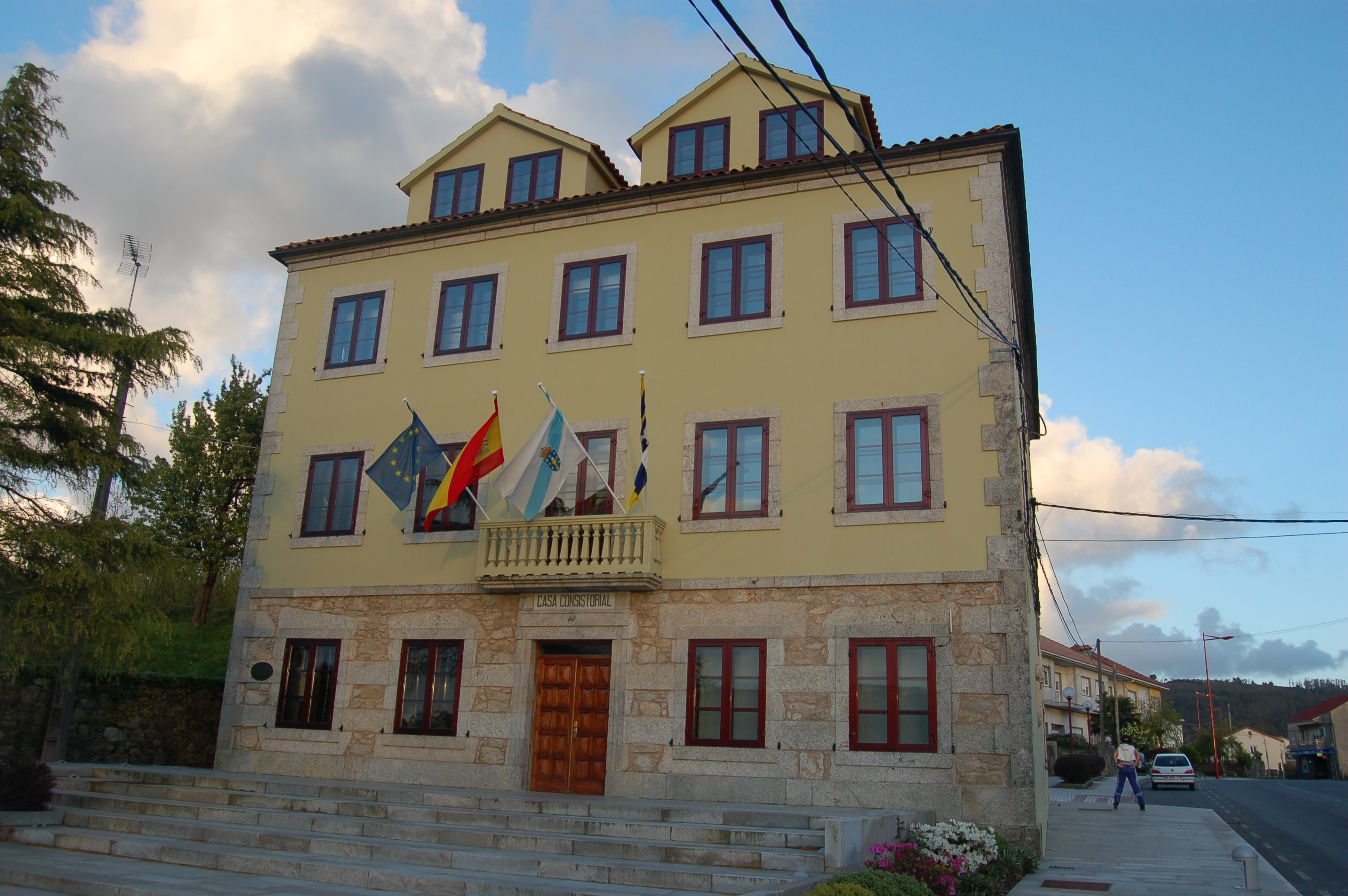

- Coat of arms
- Nickname: Dumbría
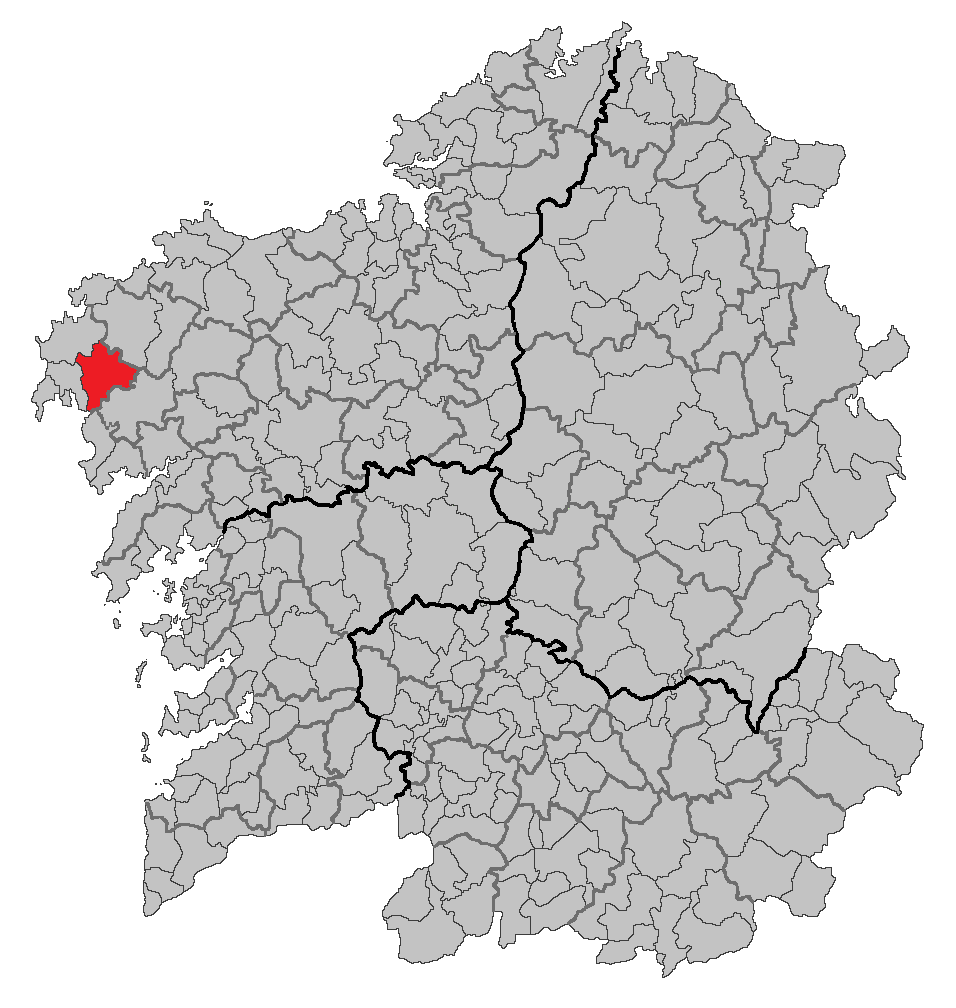
- Location of Dumbría within Galicia
- Country: Spain
- Autonomous Community: Galicia
- Province: A Coruña
- Comarca: Fisterra

Government
  - Alcalde (Mayor): Raúl González Lado (Socialists' Party of Galicia)

Area
  - Total: 125.19 km^{2} (48.34 sq mi)

Population (2023)
  - Total: 2,856
  - Density: 22.81/km^{2} (59.09/sq mi)
- Time zone: UTC+1 (CET)
  - Summer (DST): UTC+2 (CEST)

Dumbría is a municipality of northwestern Spain in the province of A Coruña, in the autonomous community of Galicia. It belongs to the comarca of Fisterra. It had a population of 2,856 inhabitants in 2023.

== See also ==
List of municipalities in A Coruña
