= Muros, A Coruña =

Town in Galicia, Spain

Coordinates: 42°46′N 9°05′W

Muros
- Municipality
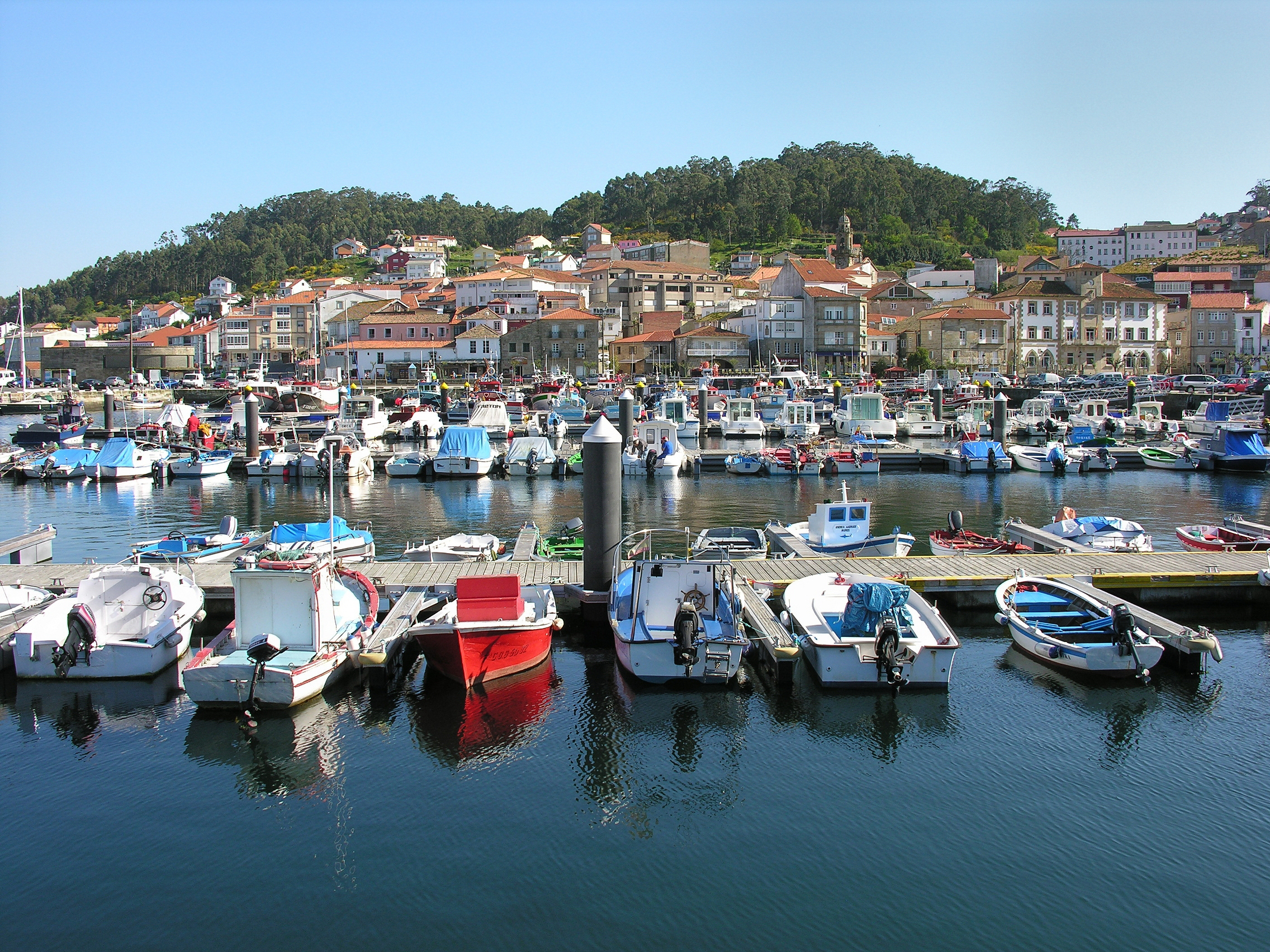
- Fishing port in Muros.

- Coat of arms

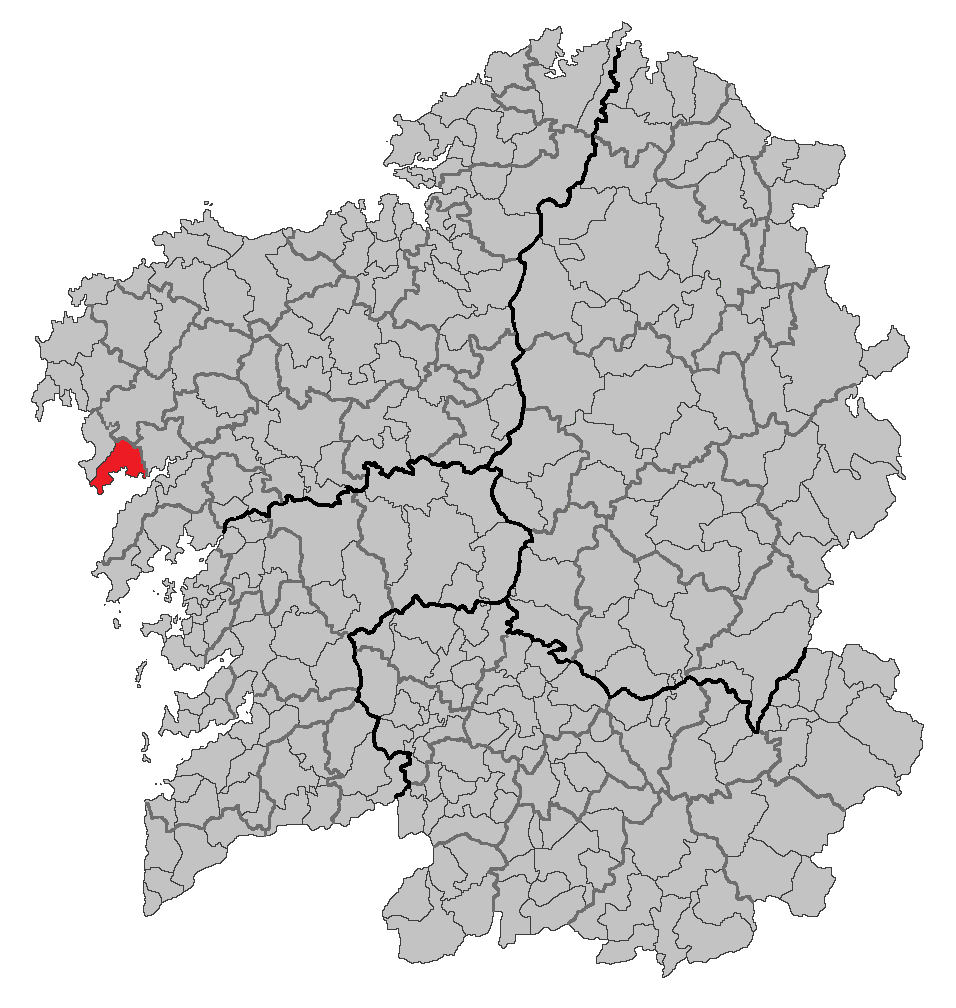
- Location of Muros

- Location in Spain
- Country: Spain
- Autonomous community: Galicia
- Province: A Coruña
- Comarca: Muros

Government
  - Alcalde: María Lago Lestón (Galician Nationalist Bloc)
- Demonym: Muradán/muradá
- Time zone: UTC+1 (CET)
  - Summer (DST): UTC+2 (CEST)
- Postal code: 15250
- Website: Official website

Muros is a municipality in the province of A Coruña in the autonomous community of Galicia, northwestern Spain. It is located in the comarca of Muros. It has a population of 10,156 (Spanish 2001 Census) and an area of 73 square kilometres (28 sq mi).

The town of Muros is an old harbour town whose traditional economy is based on fishing.

In the parish of Louro there are petroglyphs, as well as the Via Crucis, the monastery of San Francisco, and about 20 beaches.

== Demography ==
From:INE Archiv

== See also ==
List of municipalities in A Coruña
