= Atlántico Diario =

- Type: Daily newspaper
- Format: Berliner
- Owner(s): Rías Baixas Comunicación, S.A.
- Editor: José Luis Outeiriño Rodríguez
- Founded: 1 July 1987
- Political alignment: Centre-right
- Language: Spanish
- Headquarters: Vigo, Galicia
- Circulation: 5,144
- Website: www.atlantico.net

Atlántico Diario is a Spanish language daily newspaper for the Vigo metropolitan area of Galicia in Spain.
