= Porta do Sol, Vigo =

Coordinates: 42.2379°N 8.7252°W

Porta do Sol
- Puerta del Sol
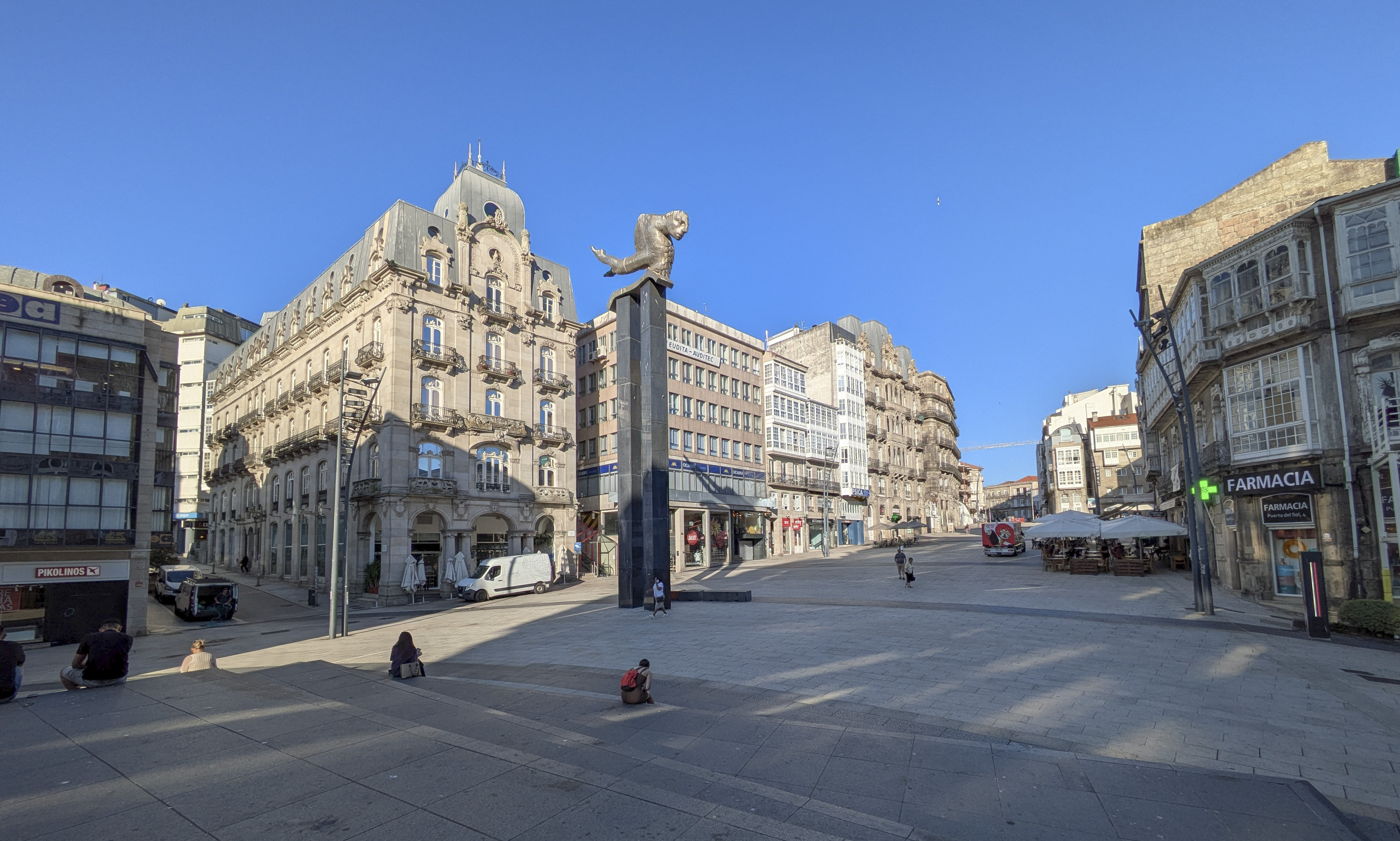
- The square after its conversion into a pedestrian zone
- Interactive map of Porta do Sol
- Location: Vigo, Galicia
- Quarter: Casco Vello
- Major junctions: Policarpo Sanz Street, Príncipe Street, Elduayen Street

The Porta do Sol, also known by its Spanish name Puerta del Sol (English: 'Gate of the Sun'), is a public square in Vigo, Spain. It's named after one of the seven gates of the city's ancient walls, demolished in the late 19th century, and was known as 'do Sol' because it faced east, where the sun rises.

It is one of the city’s most iconic landmarks and is regarded as its ‘kilometre zero’. It has witnessed major events of historical significance that took place in Vigo, such as the inauguration of the gas lighting system in 1789, the funeral of Ricardo Mella in 1925, the proclamation of the Second Spanish Republic in 1931, or the declaration of martial law at the start of the Spanish Civil War. Nowadays, it is entirely pedestrianised, and serves as a venue for events, concerts, and the annual Christmas lights switch-on ceremony.

== History ==
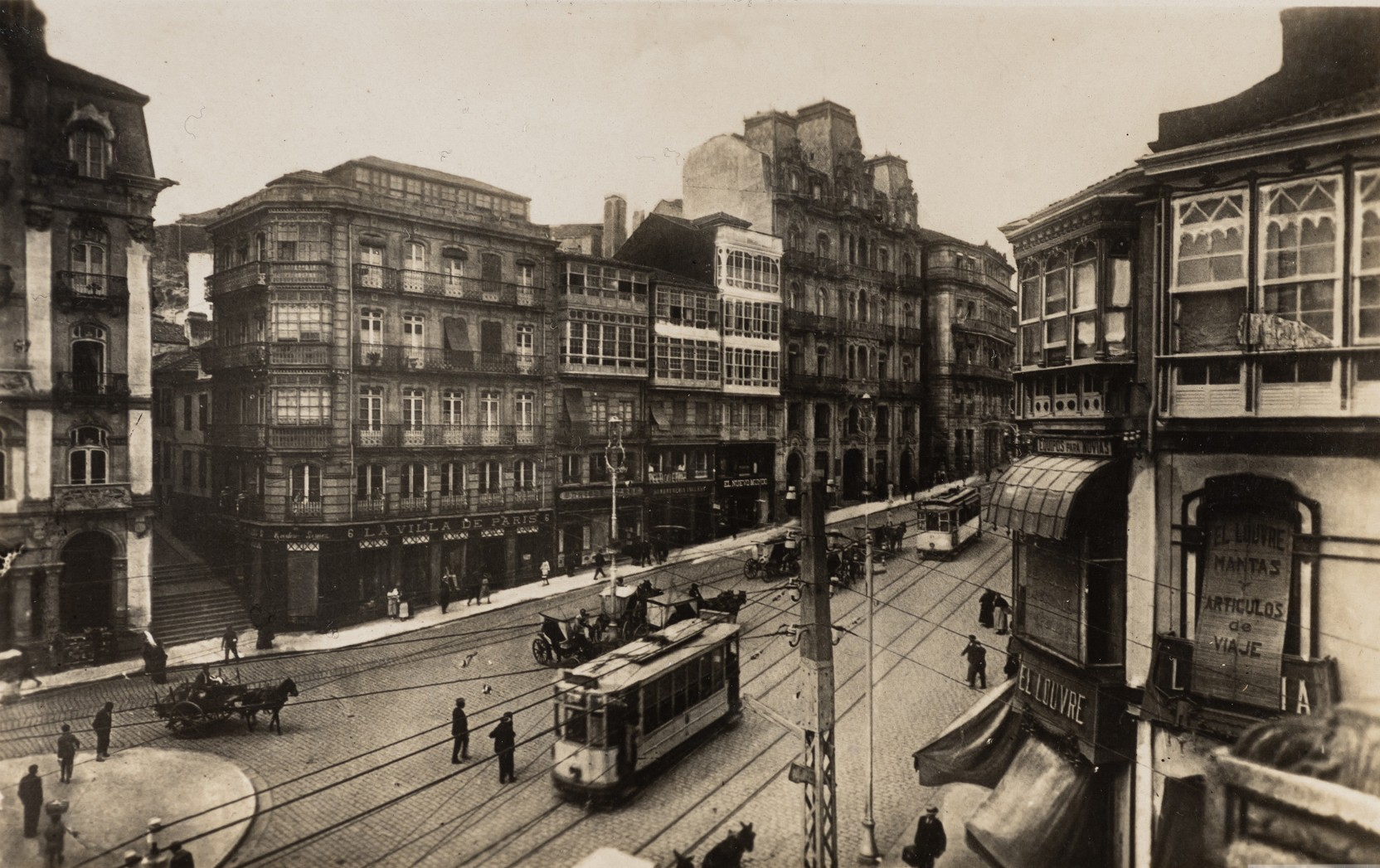
The square in the early 20th century

It dates back to the 18th century, when the city walls were being built. Before acquiring its current name, it was known as the Porta dos Tornos, as it provided access to a fountain of the same name where the town's inhabitants fetched water and washed their clothes, or as the Porta dos Carneiros ('Gate of the Rams'), as a weekly livestock market was held nearby.

In the late 19th century, with the aim of linking Príncipe Street —the starting point of the road to Ourense and Castile— with the Paseo de Alfonso XII —the starting point of the road to Baiona—, a new street was laid out, named after statesman José de Elduayen. This project completely transformed the layout of the square, and it soon became a showcase for the city’s emerging bourgeoisie. Several Art Nouveau and eclectic buildings were erected, giving the square a modern appearance inspired by Haussmann's renovation of Paris.

In 2022, a major refurbishment of the square was completed, making it entirely pedestrianised. To divert traffic, a tunnel linking Policarpo Sanz and Conde de Torrecedeira streets was built, although it has yet to be completed. During the works, several sections of the old city walls were uncovered, along with the remains of an old building known as 'Casa de Mora', which served as a meeting place for the leaders of recapture of Vigo from the French troops during the Peninsular War.

Notable buildings and landmarks

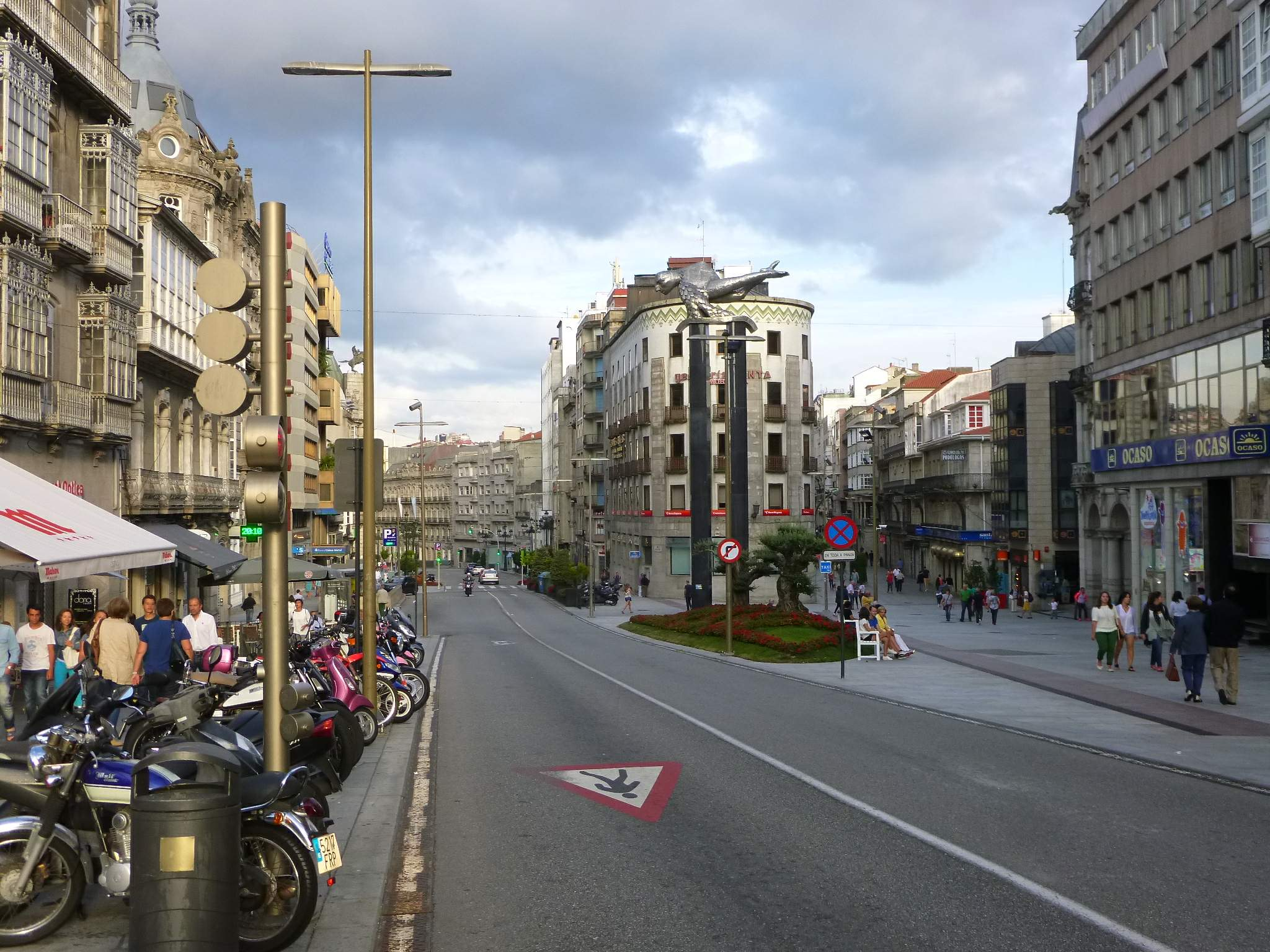
General view of the square, prior to its conversion into a pedestrian zone

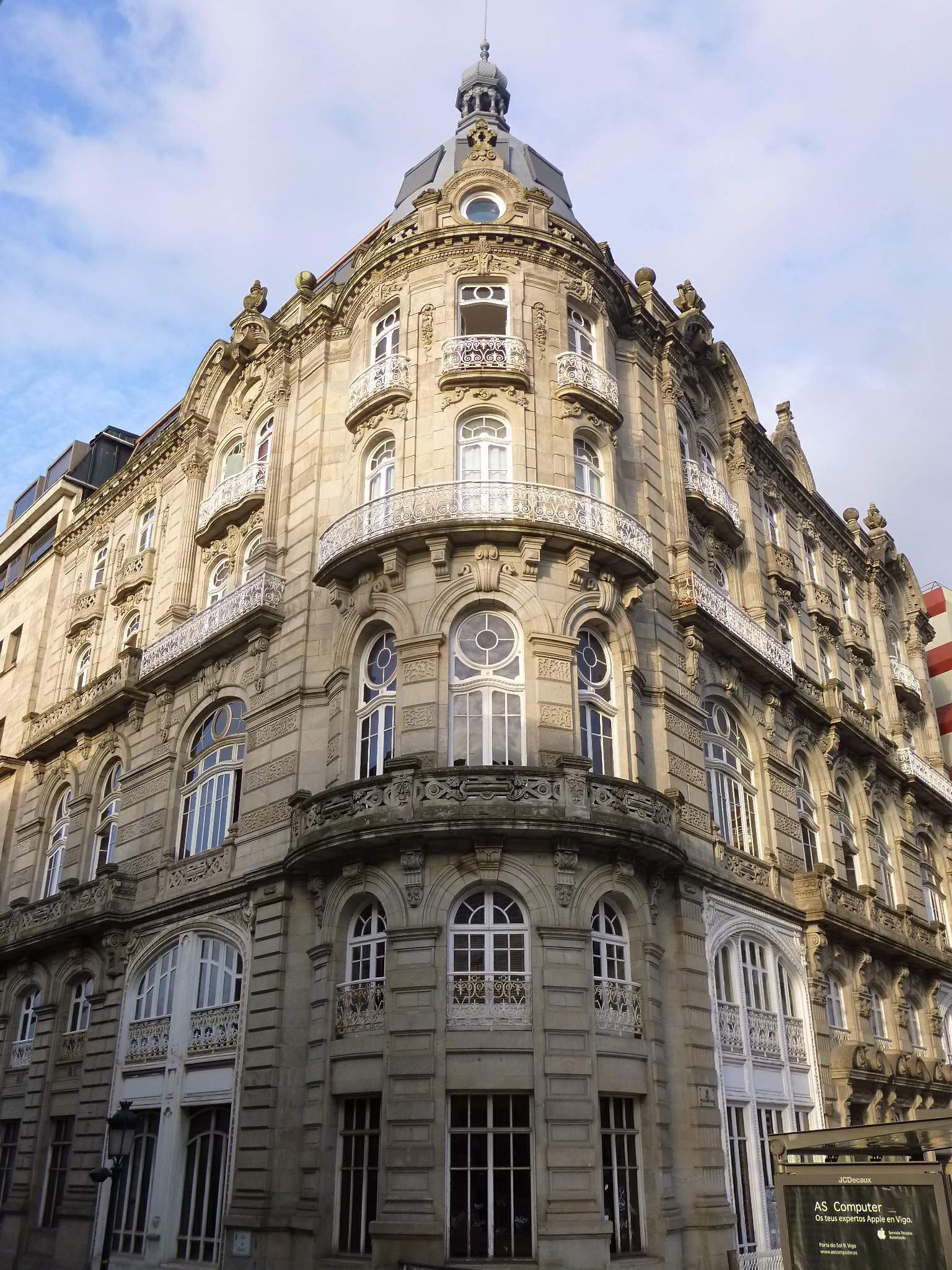
El Moderno building

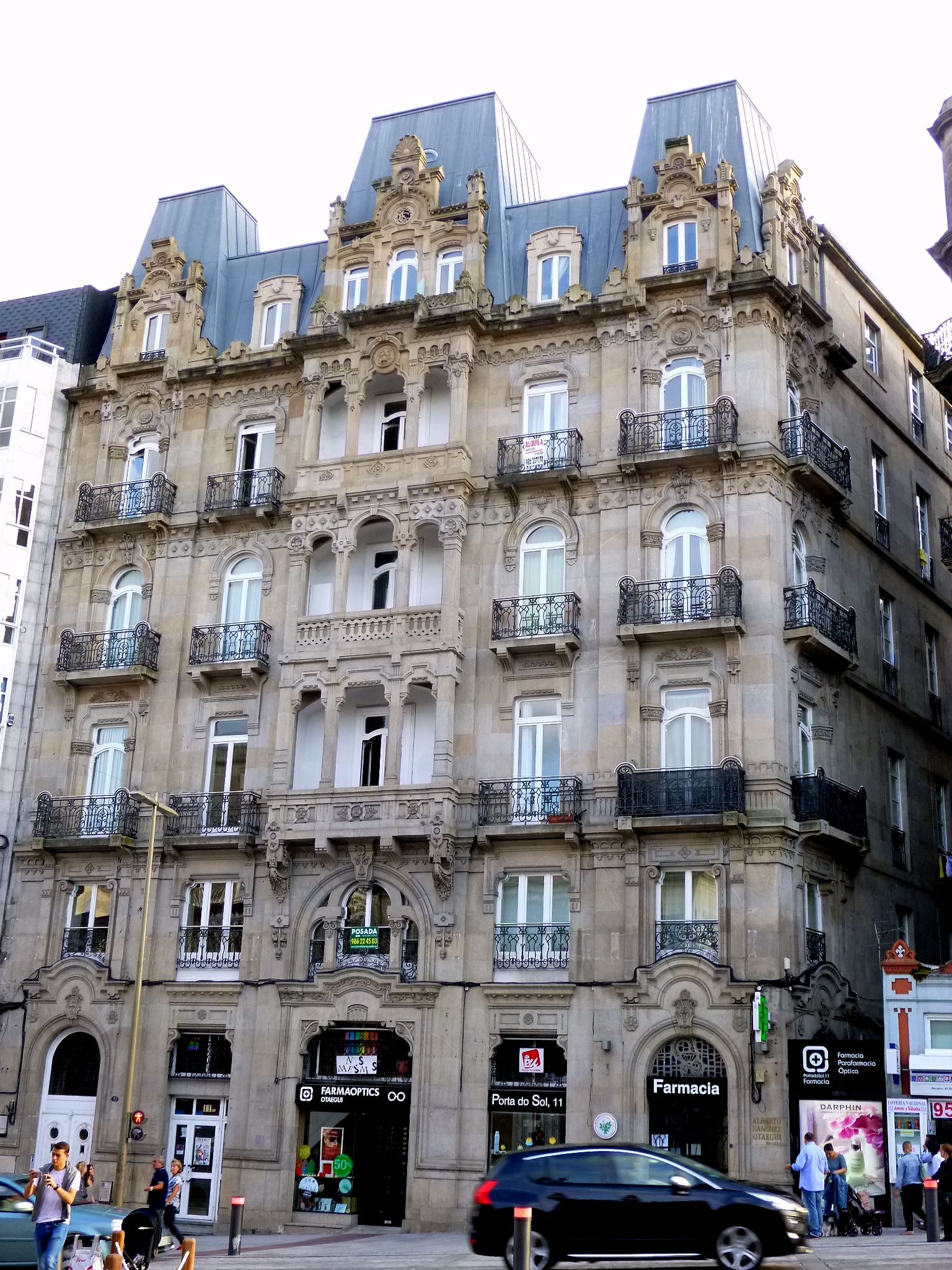
Pedro Labarta building

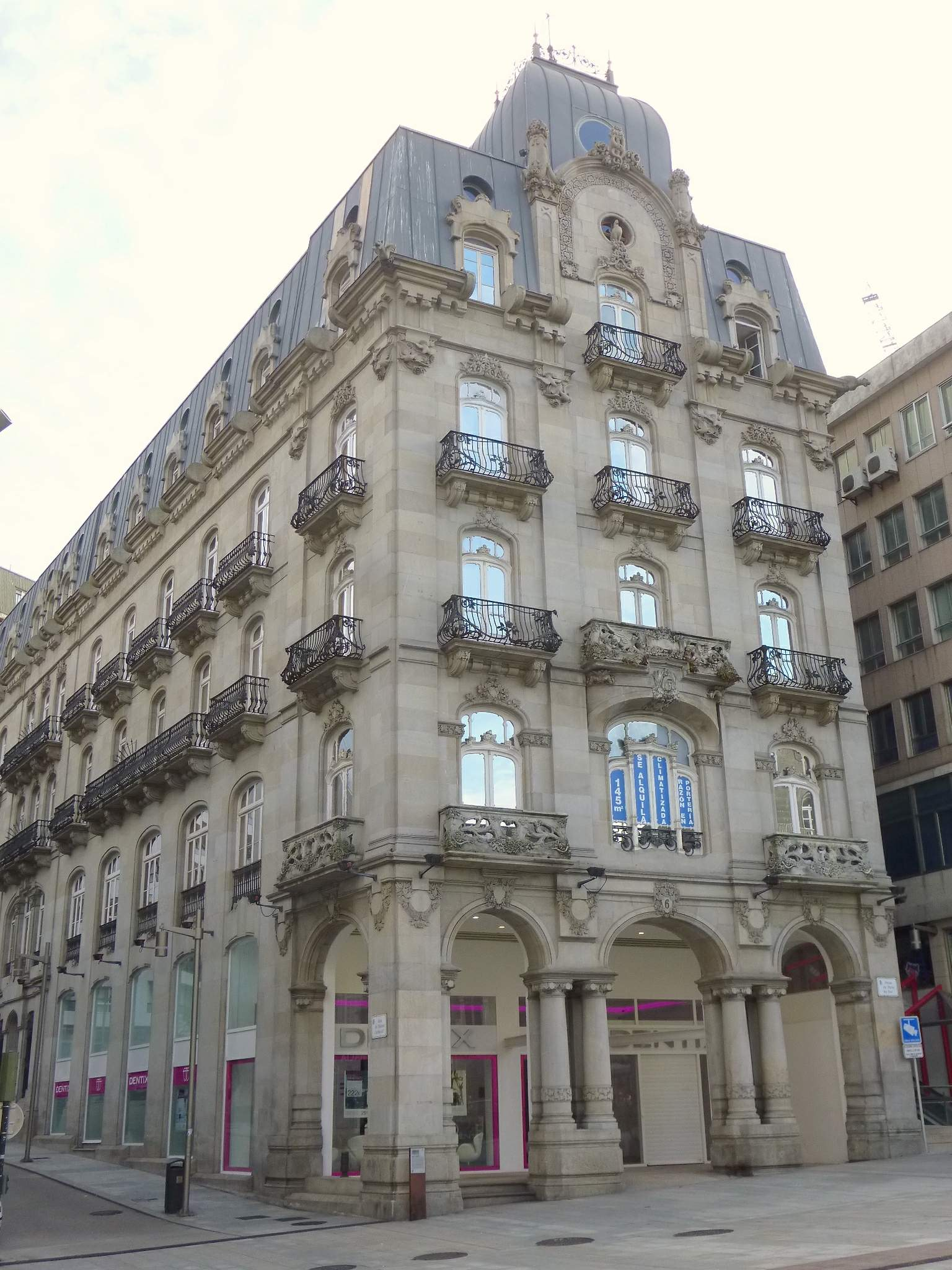
Simeón building

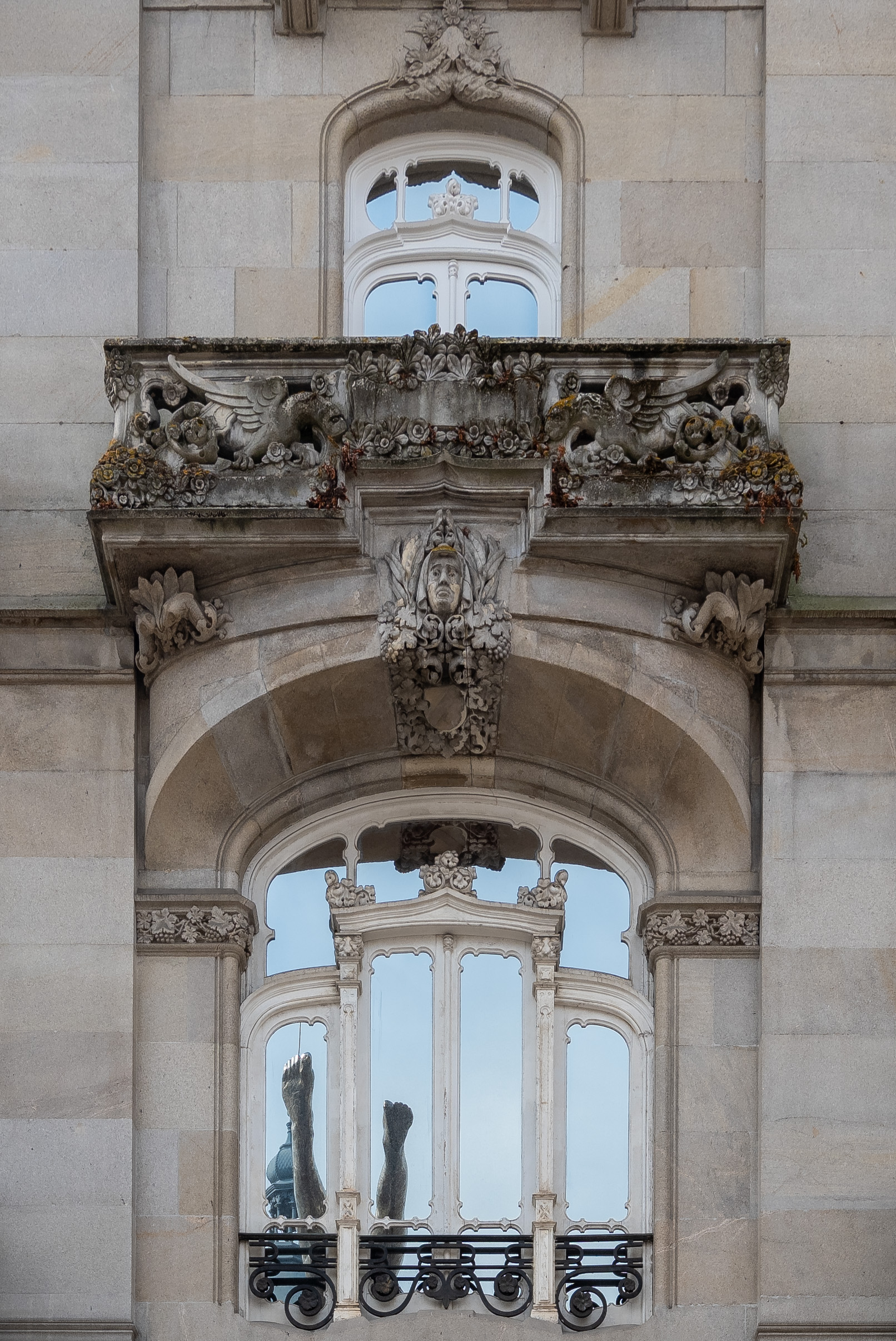
Detail of the façade of Simeón building

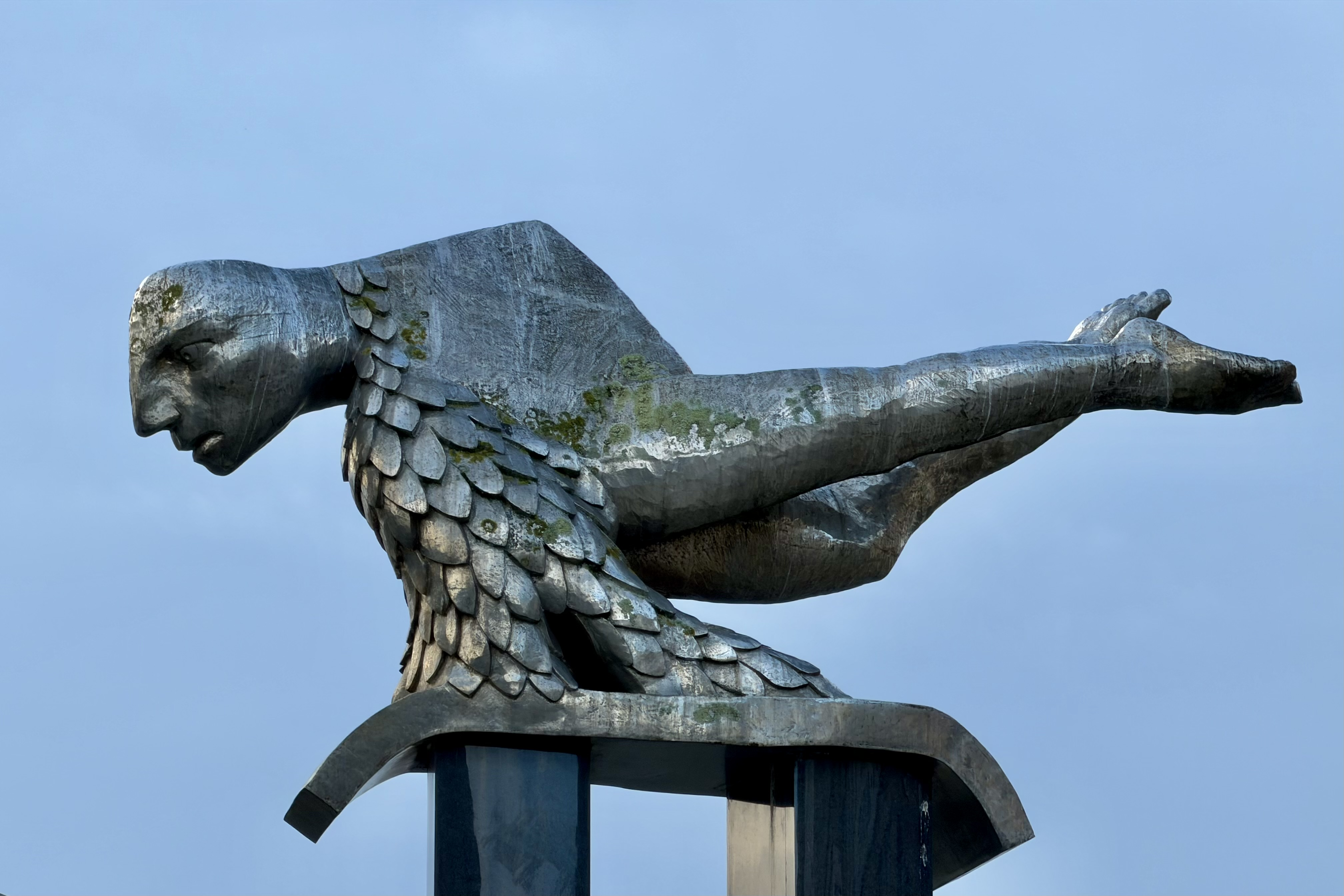
O Sireno, a modern sculpture in front of Simeón building
