= Sergio Blardony =

Spanish composer

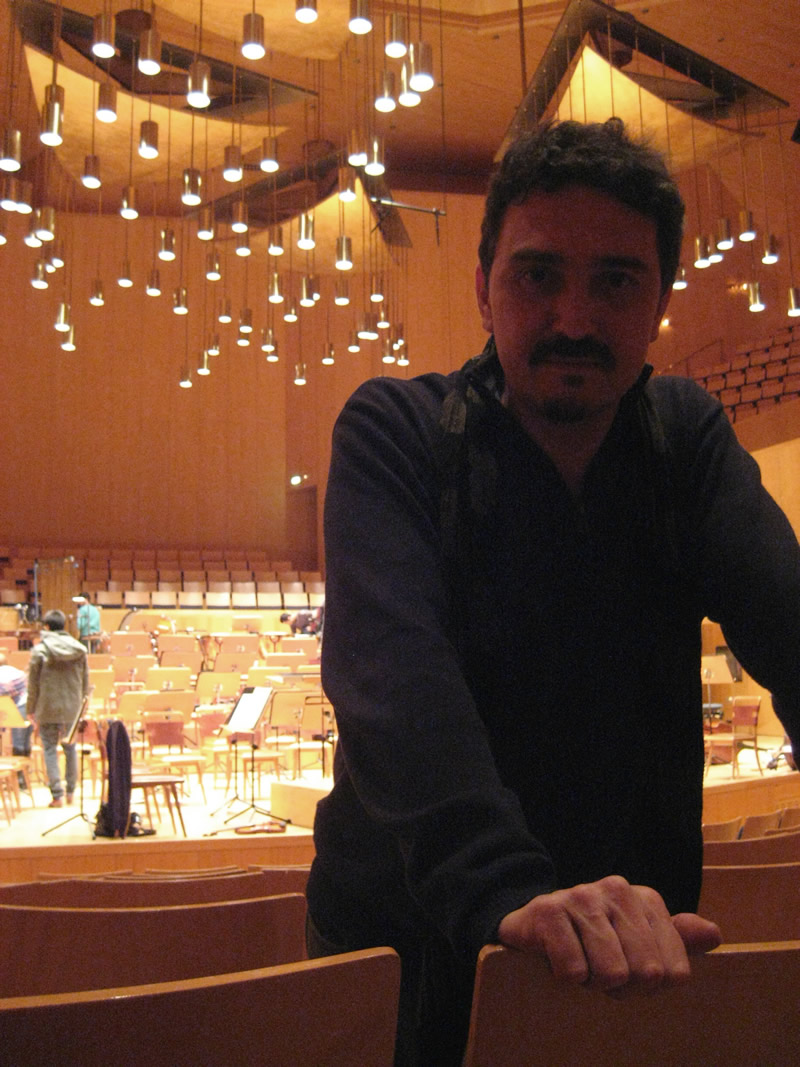
Photo of spanish composer Sergio Blardony

Sergio Blardony (born 13 July 1965), is a Spanish composer.

He studied at the Real Conservatorio Superior de Música de Madrid and, privately, with the Argentine composer Roberto J. Vittorio. Later, during four years, he was a disciple of José Luis de Delás in the Music School of the University of Alcalá de Henares. He also attended classes in composition and analysis with composers such as Helmut Lachenmann, Luis de Pablo, Javier Darias, Carmelo Bernaola, Enrico Fubini, Heinz-Klaus Metzger and Rainer Riehn.

He has been awarded various prizes, such as the Spanish Authors Society (SGAE) Composition first prize, the International City of Tarragona Award for Musical Composition, or Joaquín Turina Prize. His works have been premiered and performed internationally in countries like the U.S., France, Germany, China, South Korea, Canada, Spain, Portugal by artists like Arturo Tamayo, José de Eusebio, Alexis Soriano, Nacho de Paz, Olari Elts, José Luis Temes, Andrés Salado, Ángel Gil Ordónez, Andrés Gomis, Jonathan Carney, Jean-Pierre Dupuy, Patricia Rozario, Flavio Oliver, Carlos Bonell, Florian Popa, Francisco A. García, Sebastián Mariné, José María Mañero, Trío Arbós, SIGMA Project, TDM Trío De Magia, Cámara XXI, Vertixe Sonora Ensemble, Ensemble Télémaque, Ensemble Décadanse, Ensemble Pro-Arte, OCAZEnigma, Espai Sonor, LIM, Proyecto Guerrero, Sax-Ensemble, National Orchestra of Spain, Youth Orchestra of the Comunidad de Madrid (JORCAM), State Hermitage's St. Petersburg Camerata Orchestra, Orchestra of Cadaqués, Barcelona Orchestra/National Orchestra of Catalunya and others.

His work list included over 60 works in all genres: solo instrumental, chamber music, orchestral, scenic, electroacoustic, choral and vocal. His compositions are published by various publishers (Bèrben Edizioni Musicali, Pygmalion, EMEC, Periferia Sheet Music, Babel Scores). His current publisher is Unión Musical Ediciones (UME Madrid), belonging to the British publishing group Music Sales.
