= Vertixe Sonora Ensemble =

Spanish chamber ensemble

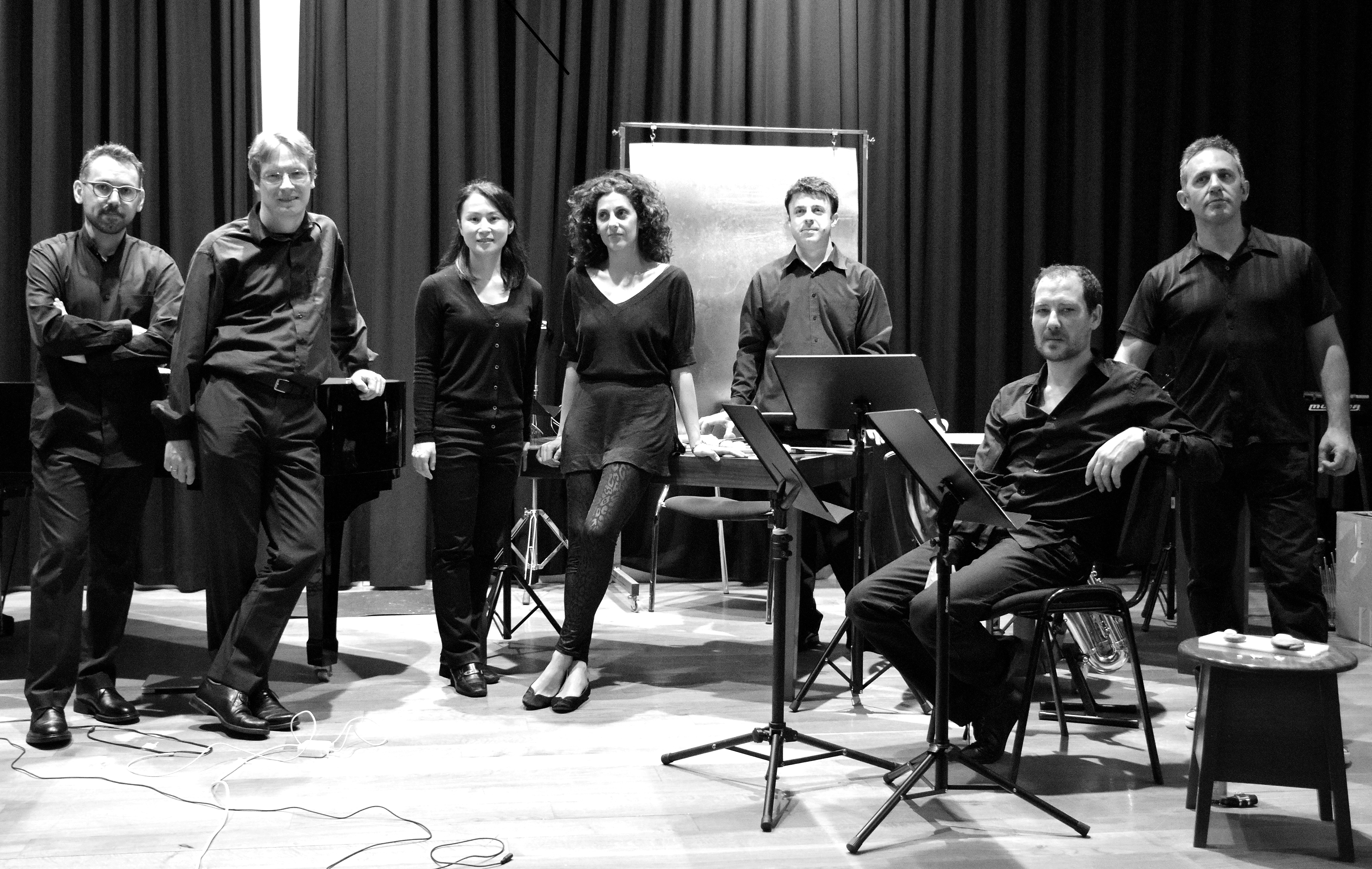
- Vertixe at the Galician Centre of contemporary Art (CGAC)

Background information
- Origin: Galicia, Spain
- Genres: contemporary classical music
- Occupations: Chamber orchestra
- Years active: 2010 -
- Members: principal conductor Ramón Souto
- Website: vertixesonora.gal

Vertixe Sonora is a Spanish chamber ensemble founded in 2010 and specialized in contemporary classical music. It is an independent non-profit organisation functioning both as a platform which supports the creation and dissemination of New Music and as a music ensemble. Its artistic director since its founding has been the composer Ramón Souto. Their work has been shown in several documentary film as Correspondencias Sonoras (2013) by Manuel del Río,

== History ==
The group appeared in 2010 as a flexible collective of soloists who specialize in contemporary classical music.

== Repertory ==
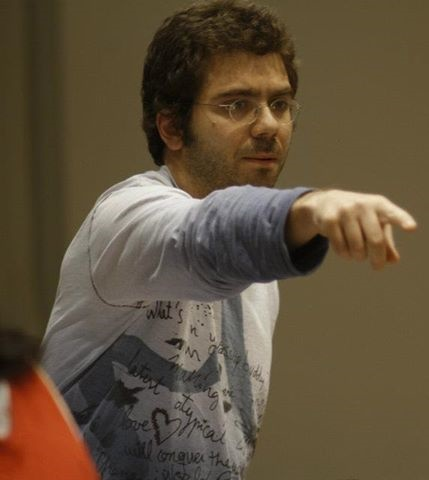
Ramón Souto, artistic director since Vertixe's founding.

The wide repertory of Vertixe Sonora mainly comprises pieces written specifically for them. Some of the composers who have collaborated with the ensemble are Ramón Souto, Santiago Díez Fischer, Fernando Garnero, Germán Alonso, Bernardo Barros, Stefan Beyer, Charles-Antoine Fréchette, Takuto Fukuda, Jacobo Gaspar, Víctor Ibarra, Esaias Järnegard, Alexander Khubeev, Matthias Kranebitter, Dmitri Kourliandski, Michelle Lou, Miguel Matamoro, Simone Movio, Abel Paul, Marek Poliks, Stefan Prins, Santiago Quintáns, Lula Romero, Elena Rykova, Benjamin Scheuer, Sabrina Schroeder, Sergio Blardony, Nadir Vassena, González Compeán, Hernández Ramos, and Mauricio Pauly.

== Members ==
- Roberto Alonso, violin
- Adriana Aranda, soprano
- Rubén Barros, electric guitar
- Jesús Coello, bassoon
- Pablo Coello, saxophones & musical direction
- Carlos Cordeiro, clarinets
- Carlos Cortés, trumpet
- Sara Chordà, violoncello
- Maribeth Diggle, soprano
- David Durán Arufe, piano
- Ángel Faraldo, electronics
- Iván Ferrer-Orozco, electronics
- Pilar Fontalba, oboe
- Jorge Fuentes, horn
- Carlos Gálvez, clarinets
- Aglaya González, viola
- Bleuenn Le Friec, harp
- Simon Lewis, horn
- Nuno Marques, electric guitar
- Carlos Méndez, double bass
- María Mogas, accordion
- Keiko Murakami, flutes
- Alfonso Noriega, viola
- Sérgio Pacheco, trumpet
- Hugo Paiva, violoncello
- Thomas Piel, violoncello
- Iago Ríos, trombone
- Clara Saleiro, flutes
- Helena Sousa, accordion
- Haruna Takebe, piano
- Daniel Veiga, clarinets
- Diego Ventoso, percussion

== Discography ==
- 2016 - XXVII Premio Jóvenes Compositores. Fundación SGAE-CNDM. Pedro Amaral, conductor
- 2019 - Lula Romero: ins Offene. Wergo
- 2020 - Víctor Ibarra: The Dimension of the Fragile - Works for Ensemble. Nacho de Paz, conductor. NEOS
- 2023 - Camilo Méndez: Peripheral Spaces. NEOS

== Documentaries ==
- 2013 - Correspondencias Sonoras. Manuel del Río
- 2014 - son[UT]opías. CampUSCulturae
- 2020 - Enrique X. Macías. A lira do deserto. Manuel del Río

== ISCM - Spain ==
Since 2021, Vertixe Sonora is the Spanish Section of the International Society for Contemporary Music (ISCM). That is the return of Spanish representation at the ISCM after several years. An important aspect of the organisation's role is to convene an annual jury to select Spanish works that will be considered for performance at the ISCM's World Music Days festival.
