= Vigo =

City in Galicia, Spain

- Municipality
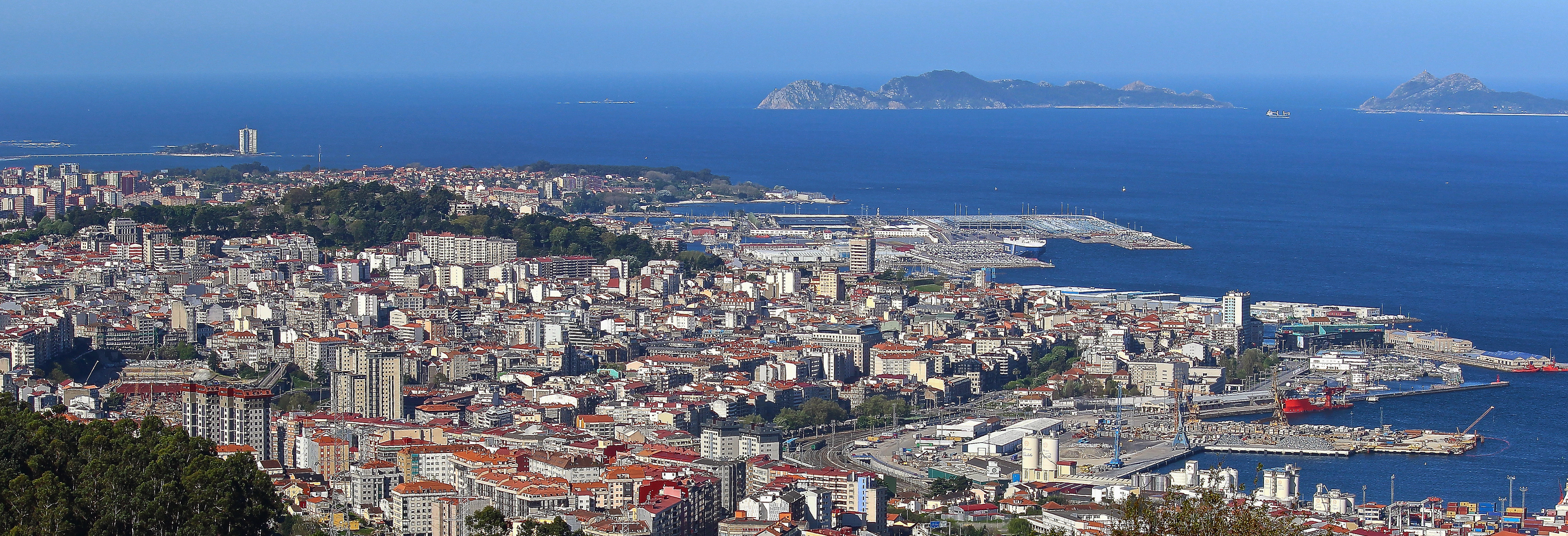
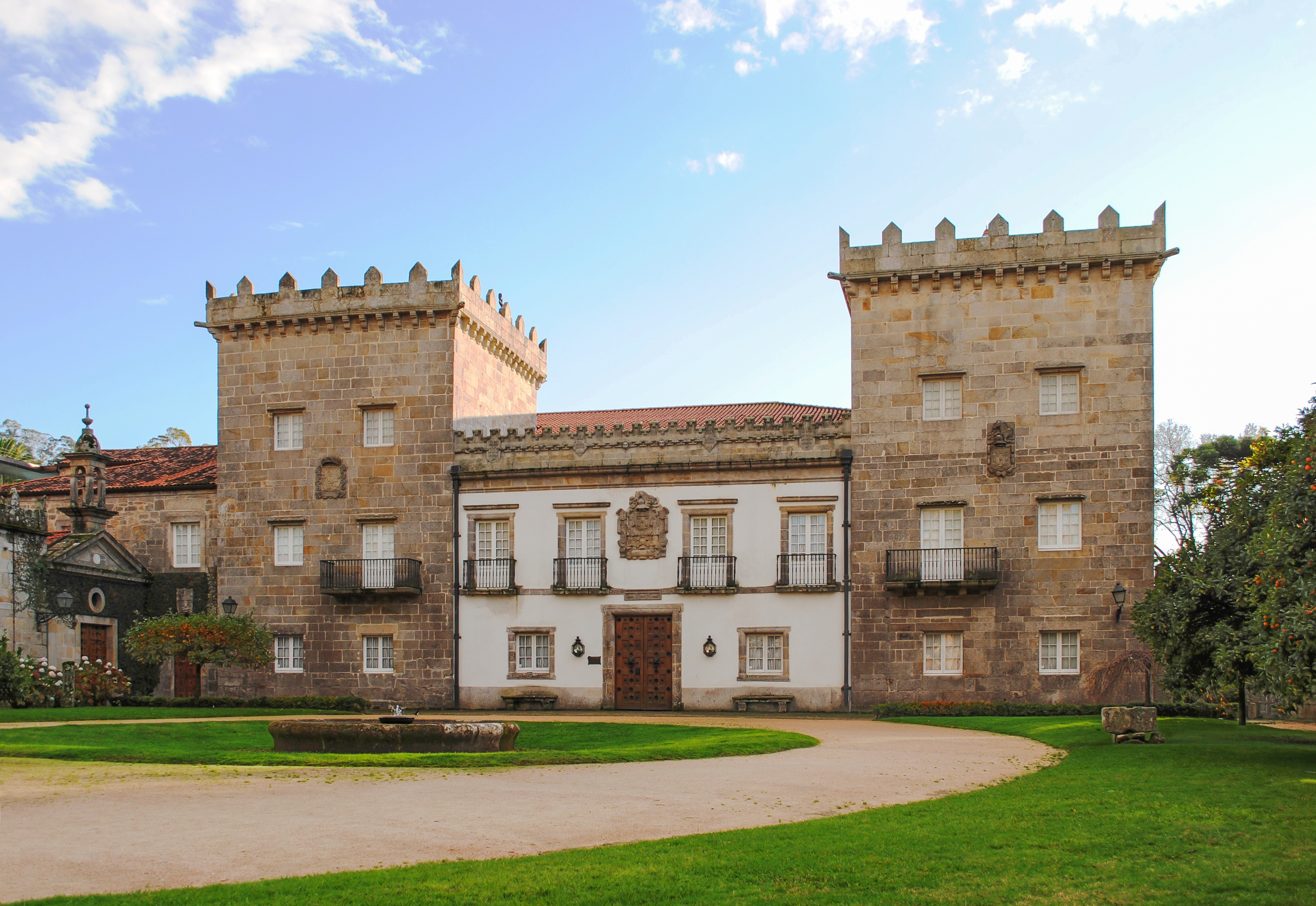
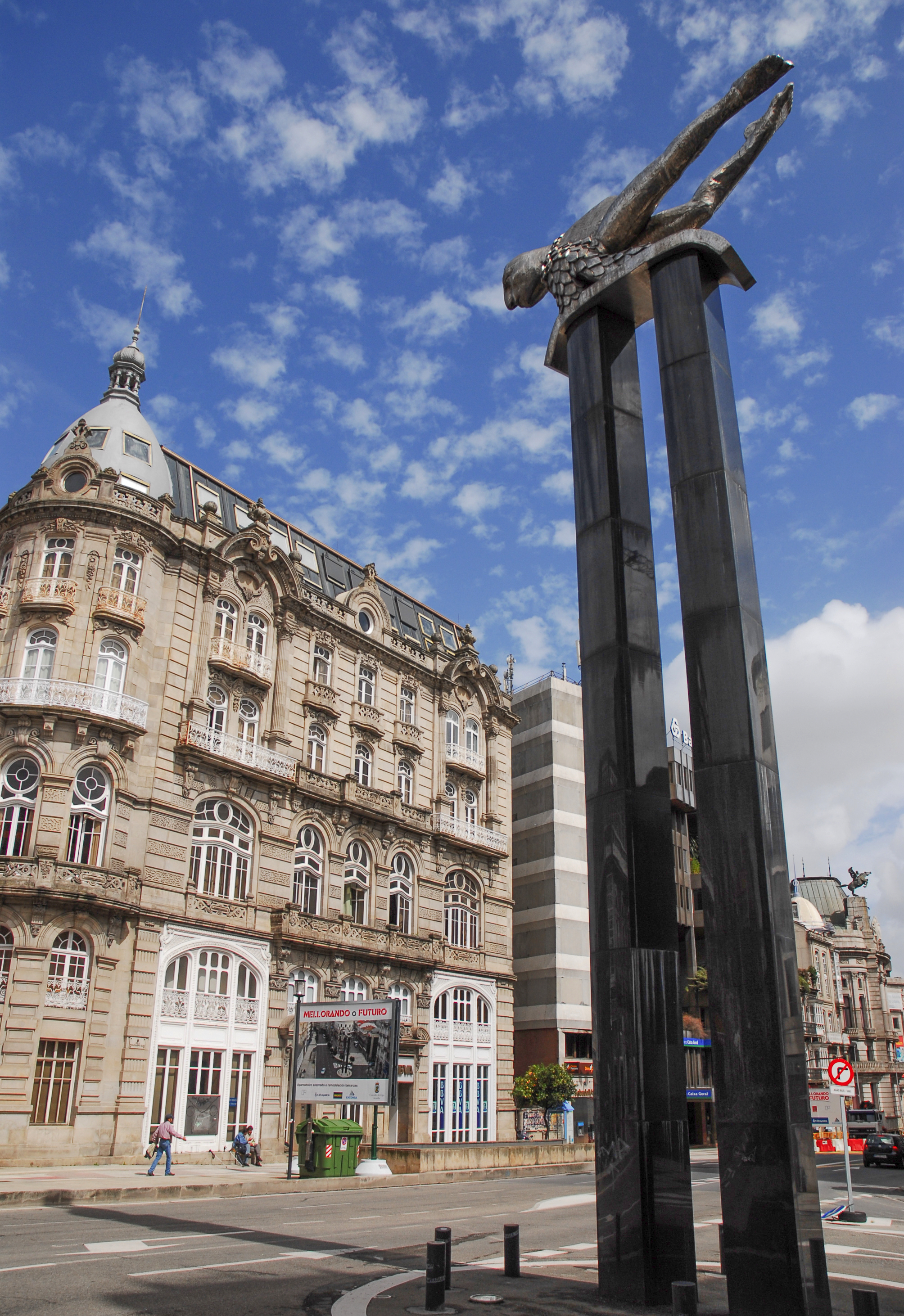
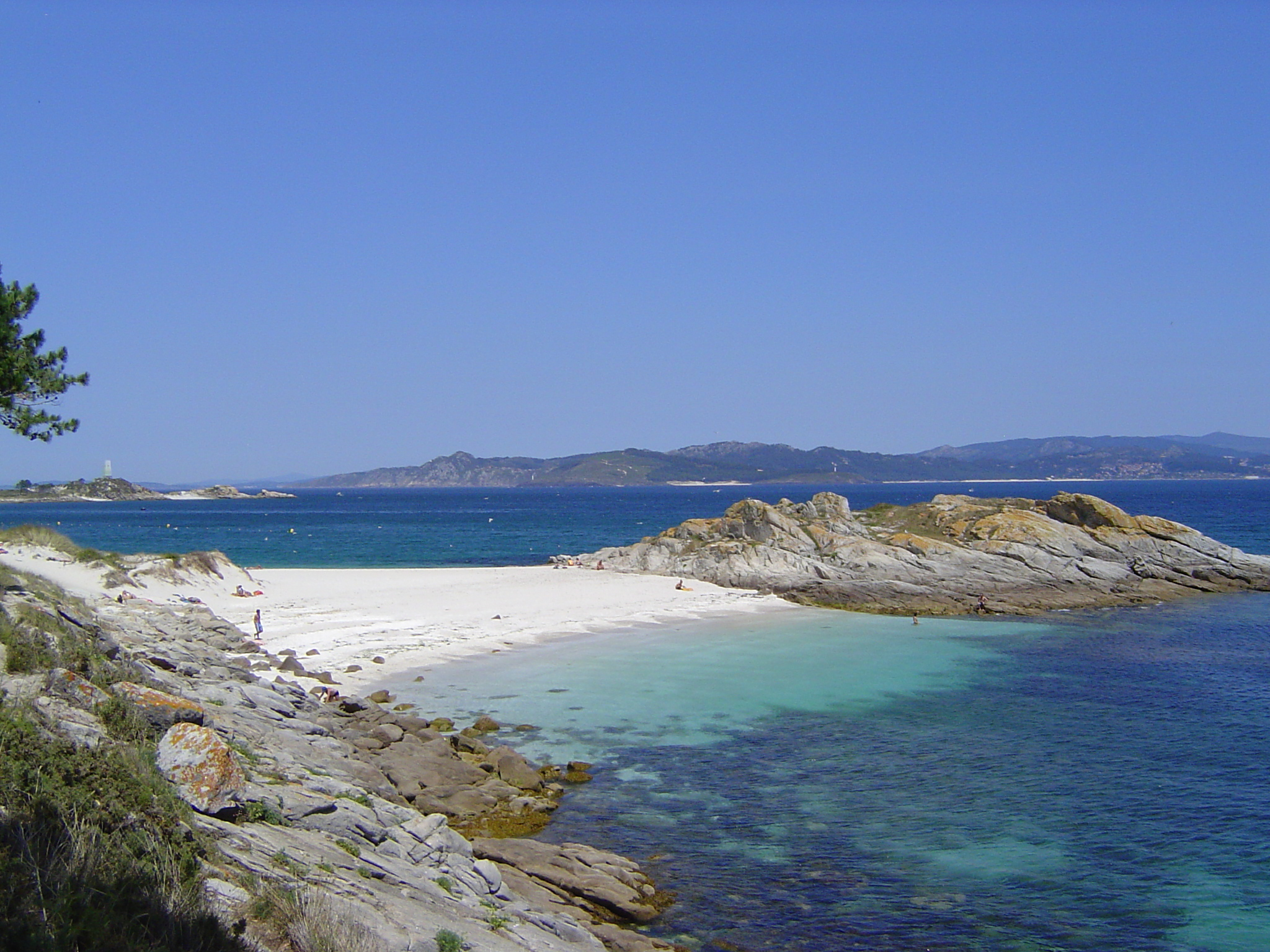
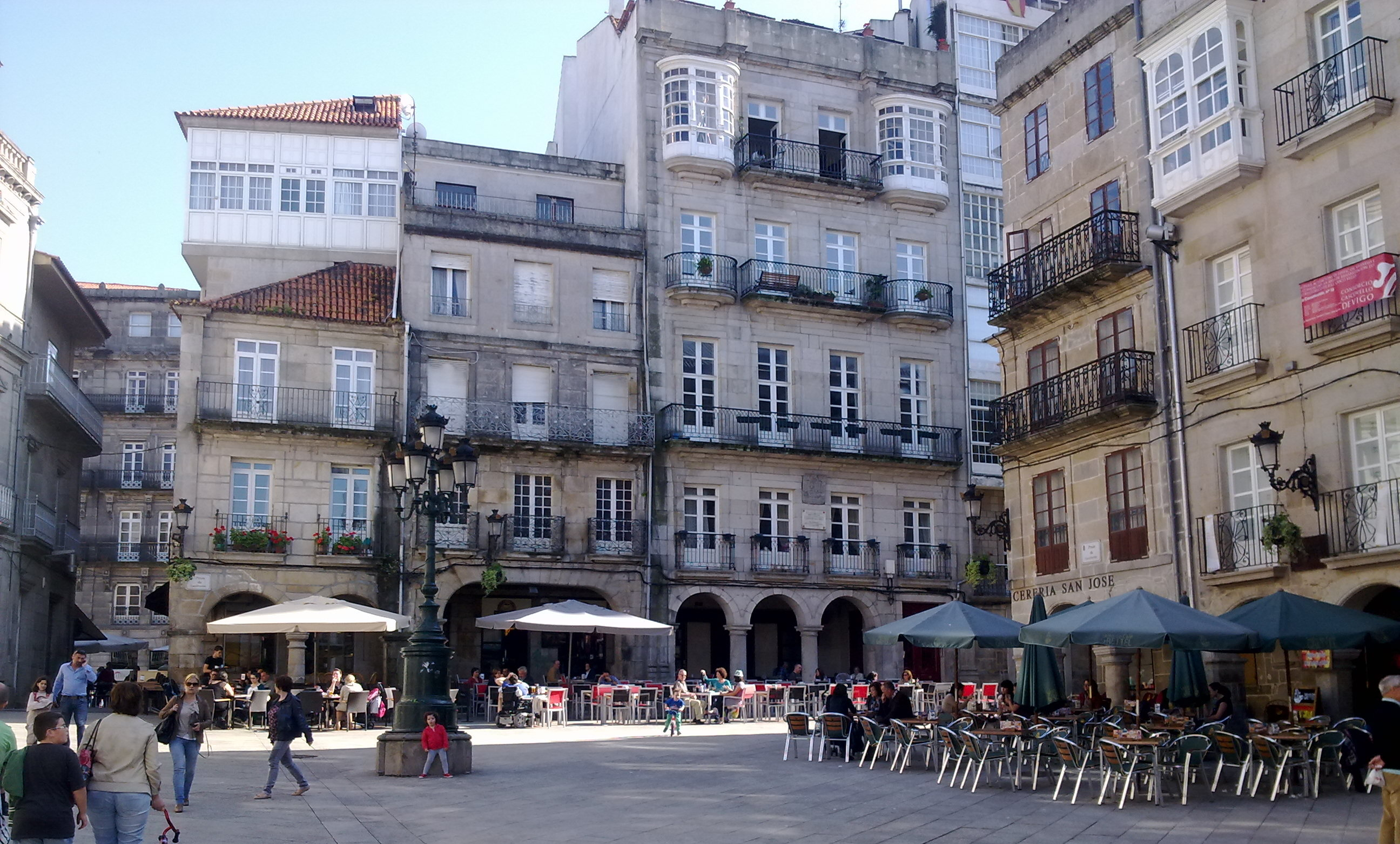
- Panoramic view Quiñones de León museum El sireno Cíes Islands Plaza de la Constitución

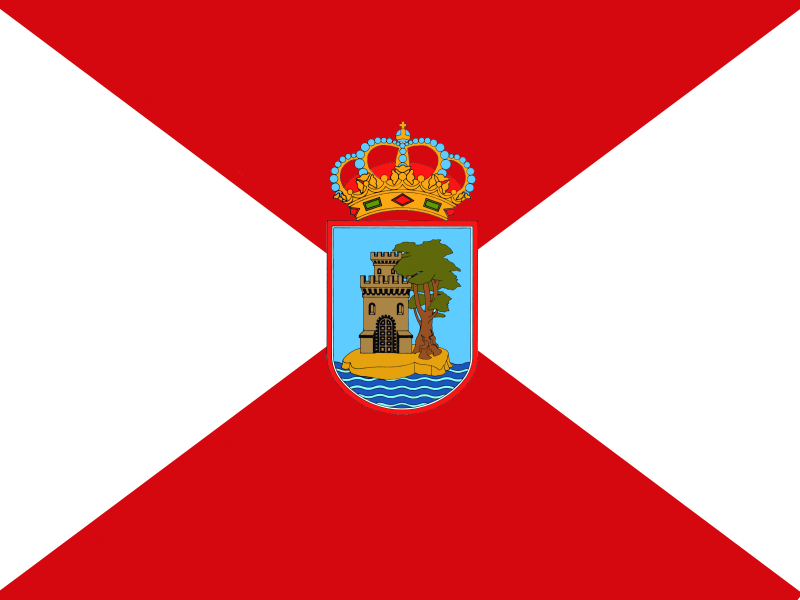
- Flag Coat of arms
- Nickname: The Olive City
- Motto(s): "Fiel, Leal, Valerosa e Sempre Benéfica Cidade de Vigo" ([The] Faithful, Loyal, Valiant and Ever Charitable City of Vigo)
- Interactive map of Vigo
- Location within Galicia Location within Spain
- Coordinates: 42.231°N 8.712°W
- Country: Spain
- Autonomous community: Galicia
- Province: Pontevedra
- Parishes: Alcabre, Beade, Bembrive, Cabral, Candean, Castrelos, Comesaña, Coruxo, Lavadores, Matamá, Navia, Oia, Saians, Sárdoma, Teis, Valadares, Vigo Centro, Zamáns

Government
  - Type: Ayuntamiento
  - Body: Concello de Vigo
  - Mayor: Abel Caballero (PSdeG-PSOE)

Area
  - Municipality: 109.1 km^{2} (42.1 sq mi)
- Highest elevation (Monte Galiñeiro): 694 m (2,277 ft)
- Lowest elevation (Ria de Vigo): 0 m (0 ft)

Population (2024)
  - Municipality: 293,977 ▲
  - Rank: 14th in Spain; 1st in Galicia
  - Density: 2,695/km^{2} (6,979/sq mi)
  - Metro: 545,892
- Demonyms: Vigoan, vigués (m), viguesa (f),olívico (m), olívica (f) (poet.)

GDP
  - Metro: €20.125 billion (2020)
  - Per capita: €27,017 (2020)
- Time zone: UTC+1 (CET)
  - Summer (DST): UTC+2 (CEST)
- Postcode: 36200-36392
- Area code: +34 986
- INE code: 36317
- Website: hoxe.vigo.org

Vigo (Galician: [ˈbiɣʊ], locally [ˈbiħʊ]) is a city and municipality, the capital of the comarca of Vigo in the province of Pontevedra in the autonomous community of Galicia, in Spain. Located in the northwest of the Iberian Peninsula, it sits on the southern shore of an inlet of the Atlantic Ocean, the Ria de Vigo, the southernmost of the Rías Baixas.

The municipality, with an area of 109.06 km^{2} (42.11 sq mi) and a population of 295,523 in 2024 including rural parishes, is the most populous municipality in Galicia, and the 14th-most-populous in Spain. The area of the municipality includes the Cíes Islands, part of the Atlantic Islands of Galicia National Park.

Vigo is one of the region's primary economic agents, owing to the French Stellantis Vigo plant and to its port. Close to the Portugal–Spain border, Vigo is part of the Galicia–North Portugal Euroregion. The European Fisheries Control Agency is headquartered in Vigo.

== History ==
In the Early Middle Ages, the small village of Vigo was part of the territory of Galician-speaking neighbouring towns, particularly Tui, and suffered several Viking raids. However, its number of inhabitants was so small that, historically, it was not considered a real town until around the 15th century, when the earliest records began.

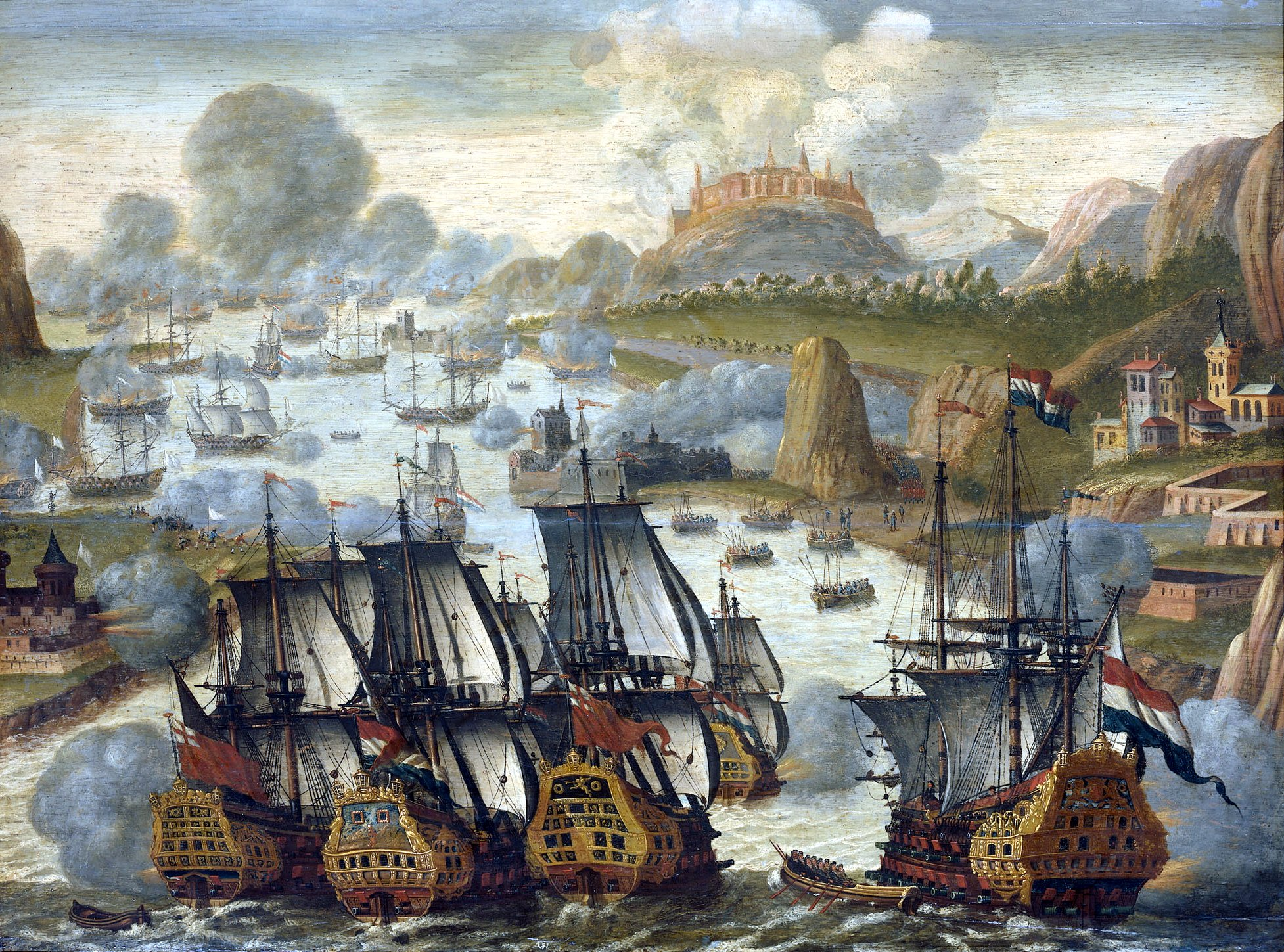
Battle of Vigo Bay, 1702

In the 16th and 17th centuries, the city was attacked several times. Francis Drake attacked the city twice – in 1585 he made a successful descent on the city gathering supplies and in 1589, during an unsuccessful attack by the English Armada, Drake raided the city and temporarily occupied it, burning many buildings. Several decades later an Ottoman fleet tried to attack the city. As a result, the city's walls were built in 1656 in the reign of Philip IV of Spain. They are still partially preserved.

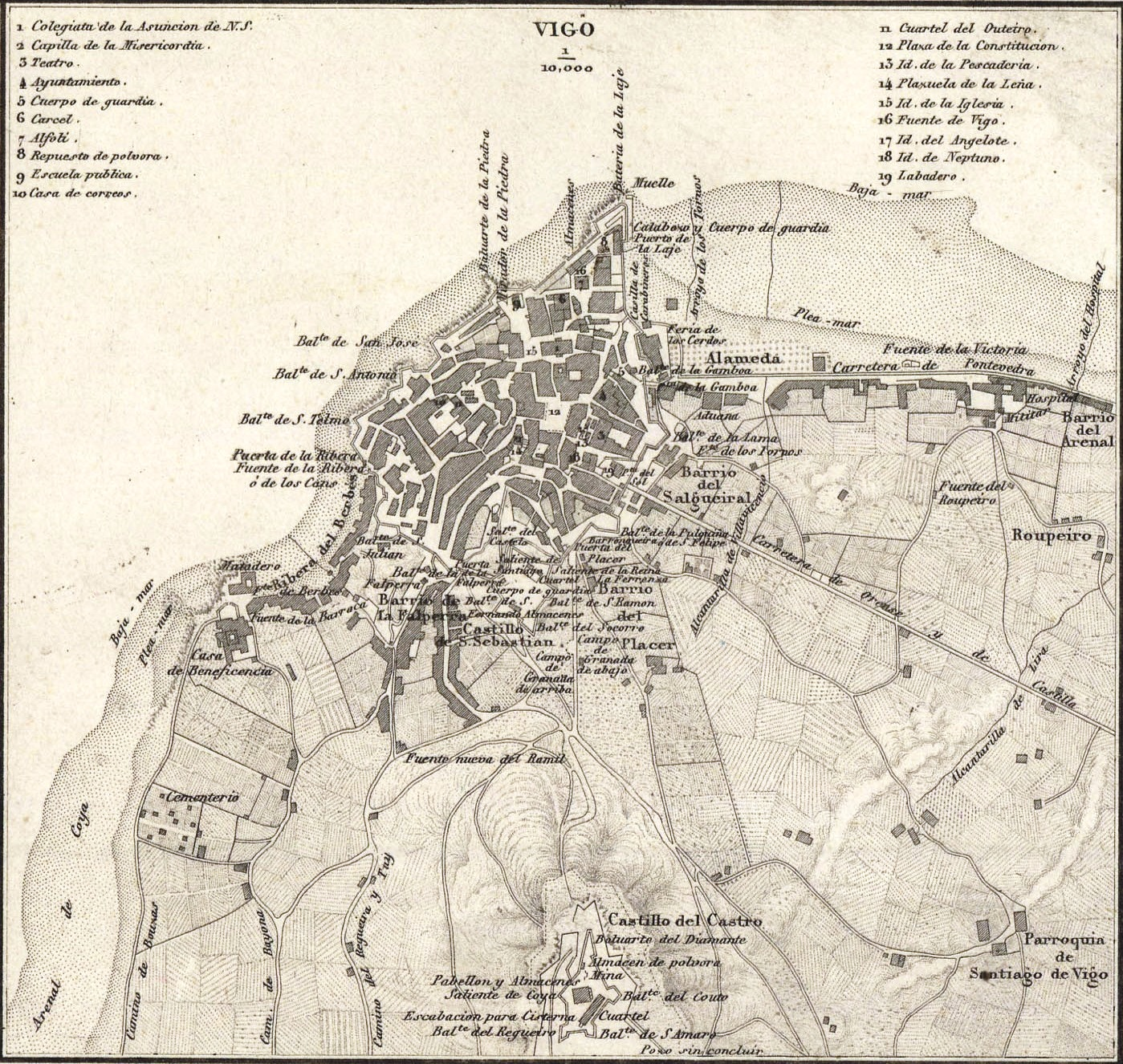
19th century map of the city, by Francisco Coello de Portugal y Quesada.

At this time, and in spite of the attacks, Vigo developed its earliest commerce and was granted several privileges by the kings of Spain.

In 1702, the Battle of Vigo Bay occurred, and in 1719, because a Spanish fleet which departed from Vigo attempted to invade Scotland in support of the Jacobites, the city was occupied for ten days by a British force.

In 1808, the French Army annexed Spain to the Napoleonic Empire, although Vigo remained unconquered until January, 1809. Vigo was also the first city of Europe to be freed from French rule, in what is annually celebrated on March 28 as the Reconquista (reconquest from the French in the context of the Peninsular War). In 1833, the city of Pontevedra was designated the provincial capital of the province of Pontevedra, within which lies Vigo.

Vigo grew very rapidly in the 20th century, thanks to the fact that the Spanish government granted it a free trade zone in 1947 to encourage international trade and economic development in southern Galicia.

== Etymology ==
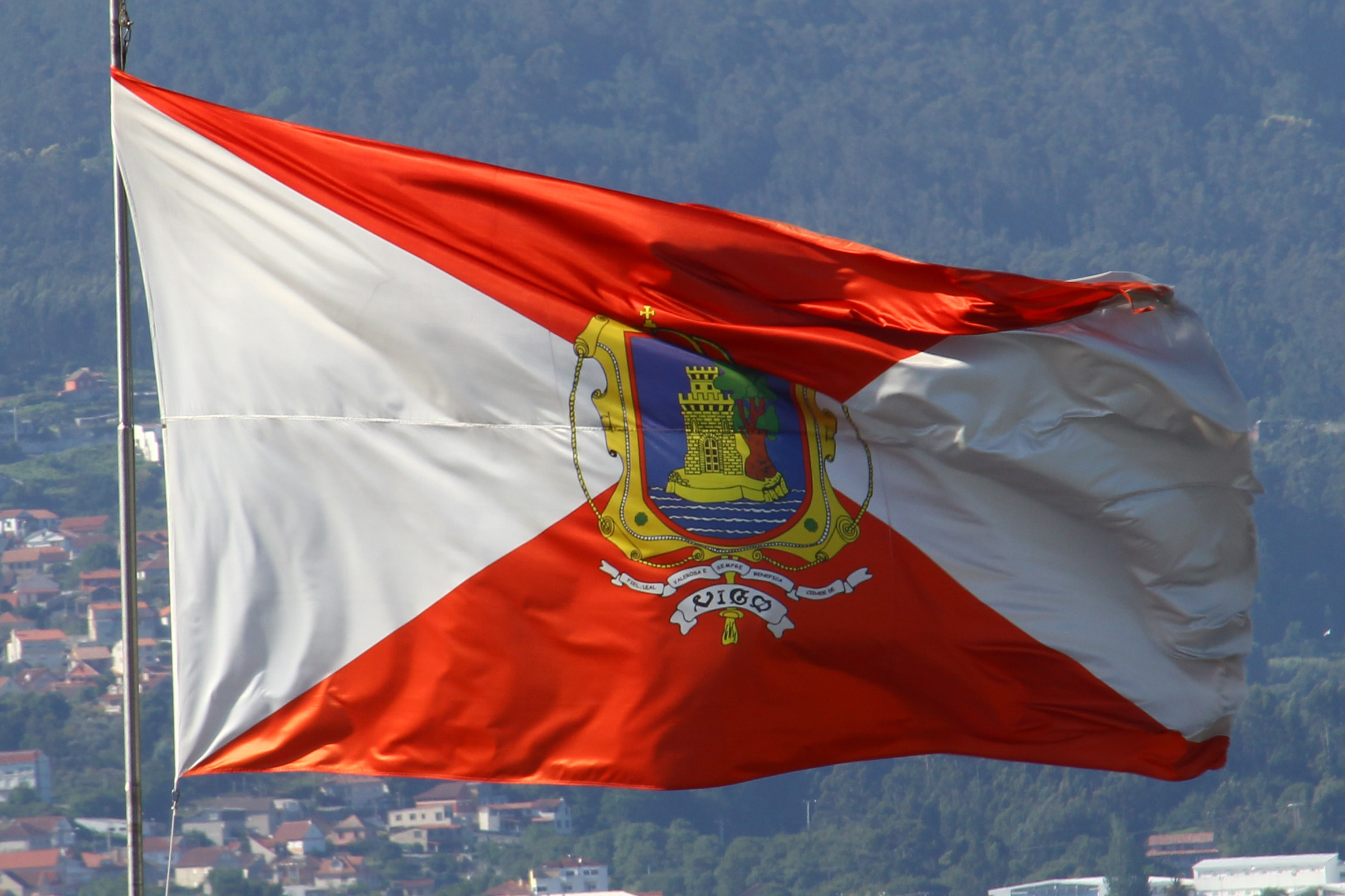
The municipal flag waving in the wind, featuring the olive tree.

Vigo's urban area is built on both a hill-fort (Castro) and a Roman settlement. It is generally accepted that the name Vigo is derived from the Latin word vicus spacorum, meaning "small village".

The standard pronunciation of Vigo in both Galician and Spanish is [ˈbiɣo].

Vigo has been given the nickname cidade olívica (city of olives). It is said that, after the conflict between Isabel de Castilla and Juana la Beltraneja - where Galician nobility fought for the latter - the victor ordered all of Galicia's olive trees to be cut down, as they symbolized peace. The tree in Vigo however, could not be uprooted as it was planted in sacred ground. The tree is represented in the city seal, and a descendant of it is still alive in Vigo's city centre.

== Geography ==
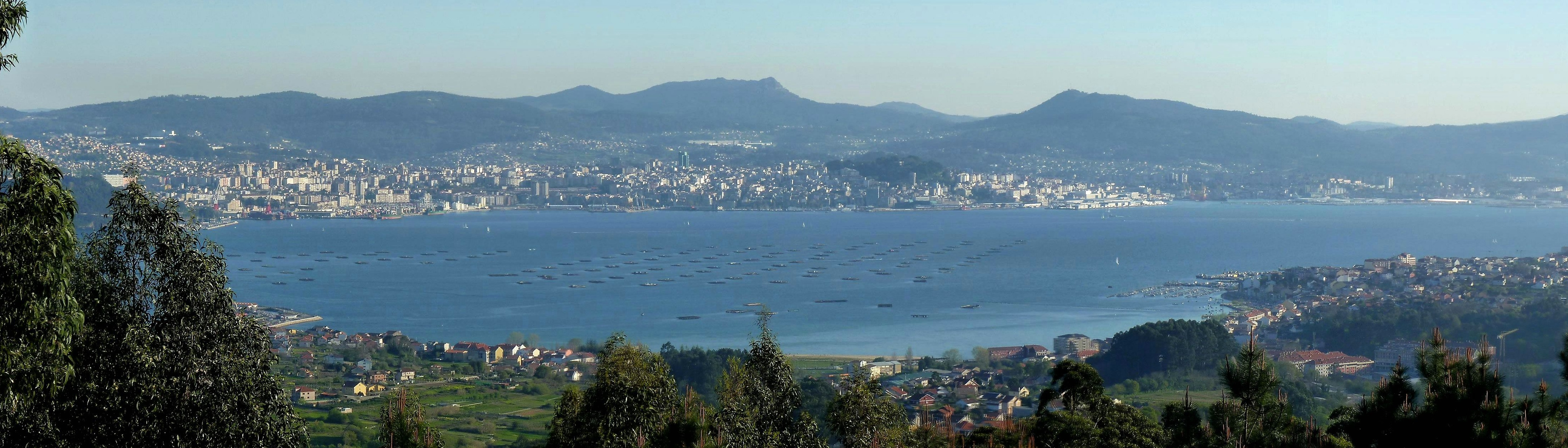
Vigo, as seen from the opposite shore of the ria.

Vigo borders the municipalities of Redondela to the northeast; to the east, Mos; to the south, O Porriño and Gondomar; and to the southwest, Nigrán. On the opposite side of the bay are the municipalities of Cangas and Moaña.

=== Climate ===
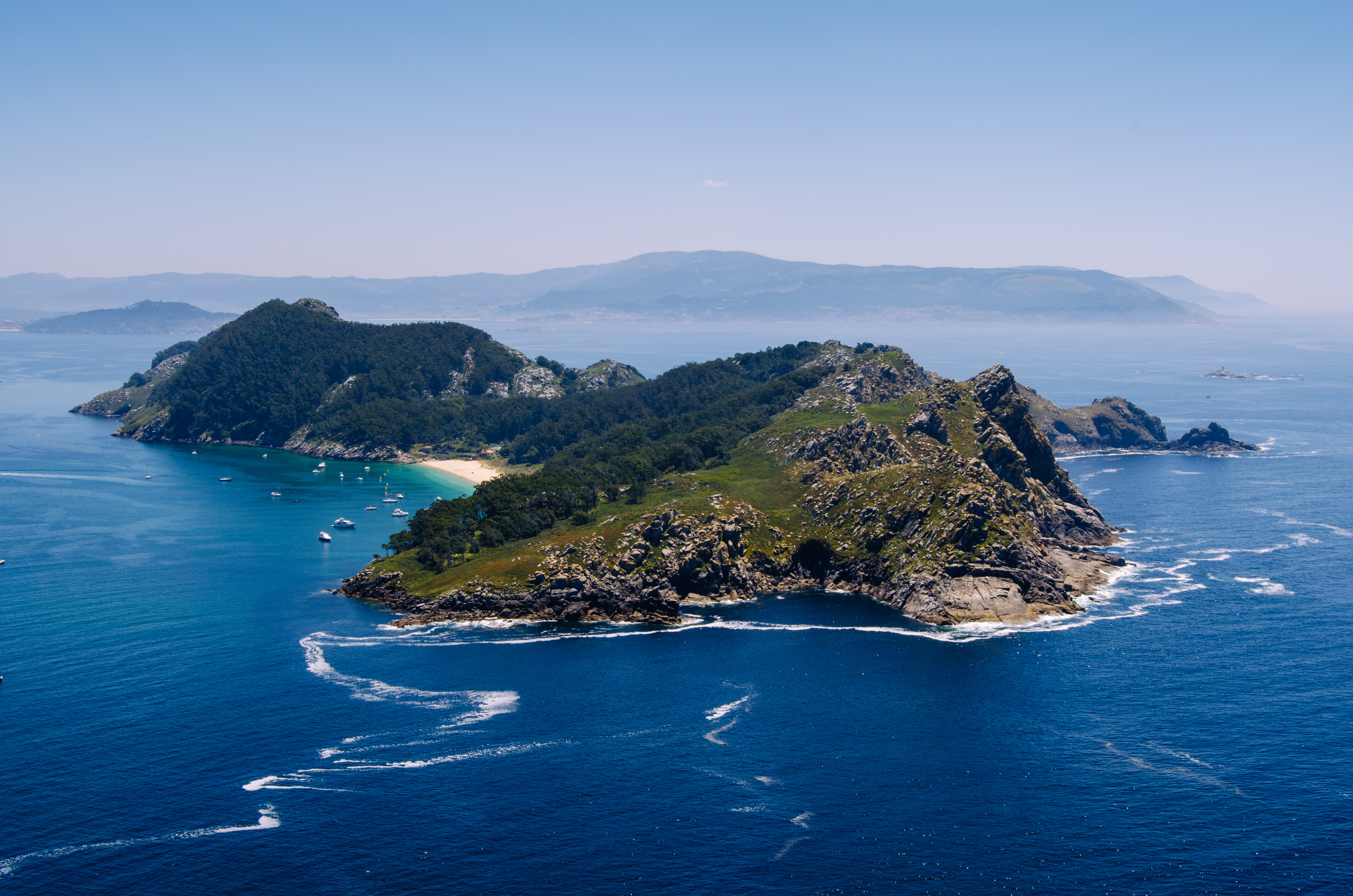
The Cíes Islands, part of the municipality of Vigo and the Atlantic Islands of Galicia National Park, partially obstruct the access from the Ria de Vigo to the open seas.

Vigo has a warm-summer Mediterranean climate (Köppen: Csb, Trewartha: Csbk), characterized by mild temperatures throughout the year, heavier rainfall on winters and appreciable summer drought. Although Vigo is the rainiest city in Galicia, its pronounced summer drying trend makes its climate more similar to the one observed in cities across the Pacific Northwest. The all-time record high for the city is 40.8 °C (105 °F) set on August 7, 2016. Since Vigo is known for its extreme rainfall in winter, December 1978 saw 925.6 millimetres (36.44 in) fall at the weather station in a single month. During that month on 7 December, 175 millimetres (6.9 in) fell on a single day. Normal values for 1991–2020 was 1,695 millimetres (66.7 in) falling on just 126 days indicating heavy rain to be common. The airport where values are taken is located further inland at a considerably higher elevation (261 metres (856 ft)) than the city itself located on the coastline in the Ria de Vigo estuary, which is likely warmer year-round.

Climate data for Vigo (Vigo Airport 261m) (1991–2020). Extremes (1951–present)
Month	Jan	Feb	Mar	Apr	May	Jun	Jul	Aug	Sep	Oct	Nov	Dec	Year
Record high °C (°F)	21.8 (71.2)	27.6 (81.7)	28.1 (82.6)	29.6 (85.3)	33.6 (92.5)	38.6 (101.5)	39.7 (103.5)	40.8 (105.4)	36.9 (98.4)	32.6 (90.7)	24.6 (76.3)	23.2 (73.8)	40.8 (105.4)
Mean daily maximum °C (°F)	12.2 (54.0)	13.6 (56.5)	16.0 (60.8)	17.3 (63.1)	19.8 (67.6)	22.7 (72.9)	24.9 (76.8)	25.2 (77.4)	23.2 (73.8)	19.4 (66.9)	14.9 (58.8)	12.7 (54.9)	18.5 (65.3)
Daily mean °C (°F)	8.9 (48.0)	9.7 (49.5)	11.7 (53.1)	12.9 (55.2)	15.3 (59.5)	18.0 (64.4)	19.9 (67.8)	20.2 (68.4)	18.5 (65.3)	15.4 (59.7)	11.5 (52.7)	9.5 (49.1)	14.3 (57.7)
Mean daily minimum °C (°F)	5.6 (42.1)	5.8 (42.4)	7.4 (45.3)	8.5 (47.3)	10.7 (51.3)	13.2 (55.8)	14.8 (58.6)	15.0 (59.0)	13.8 (56.8)	11.4 (52.5)	8.1 (46.6)	6.4 (43.5)	10.1 (50.1)
Record low °C (°F)	−4.0 (24.8)	−5.0 (23.0)	−3.0 (26.6)	−0.2 (31.6)	2.0 (35.6)	4.6 (40.3)	7.6 (45.7)	7.2 (45.0)	5.0 (41.0)	1.0 (33.8)	−0.8 (30.6)	−3.4 (25.9)	−5.0 (23.0)
Average precipitation mm (inches)	222 (8.7)	143 (5.6)	153 (6.0)	150 (5.9)	113 (4.4)	56 (2.2)	40 (1.6)	48 (1.9)	95 (3.7)	208 (8.2)	236 (9.3)	231 (9.1)	1,695 (66.6)
Average precipitation days (≥ 1 mm)	14.4	11.2	12.2	12.8	10.7	6.7	4.8	5.2	7.6	12.5	13.5	14.4	126
Average snowy days	0	0	0.1	0.1	0	0	0	0	0	0	0	0.1	0.3
Average relative humidity (%)	84	77	73	73	72	71	71	71	74	80	85	85	76
Mean monthly sunshine hours	109	133	180	204	236	273	295	282	213	155	111	102	2,293
Percentage possible sunshine	37	45	49	51	52	60	64	66	57	45	37	35	50
Source: Agencia Estatal de Meteorología

== Demographics ==
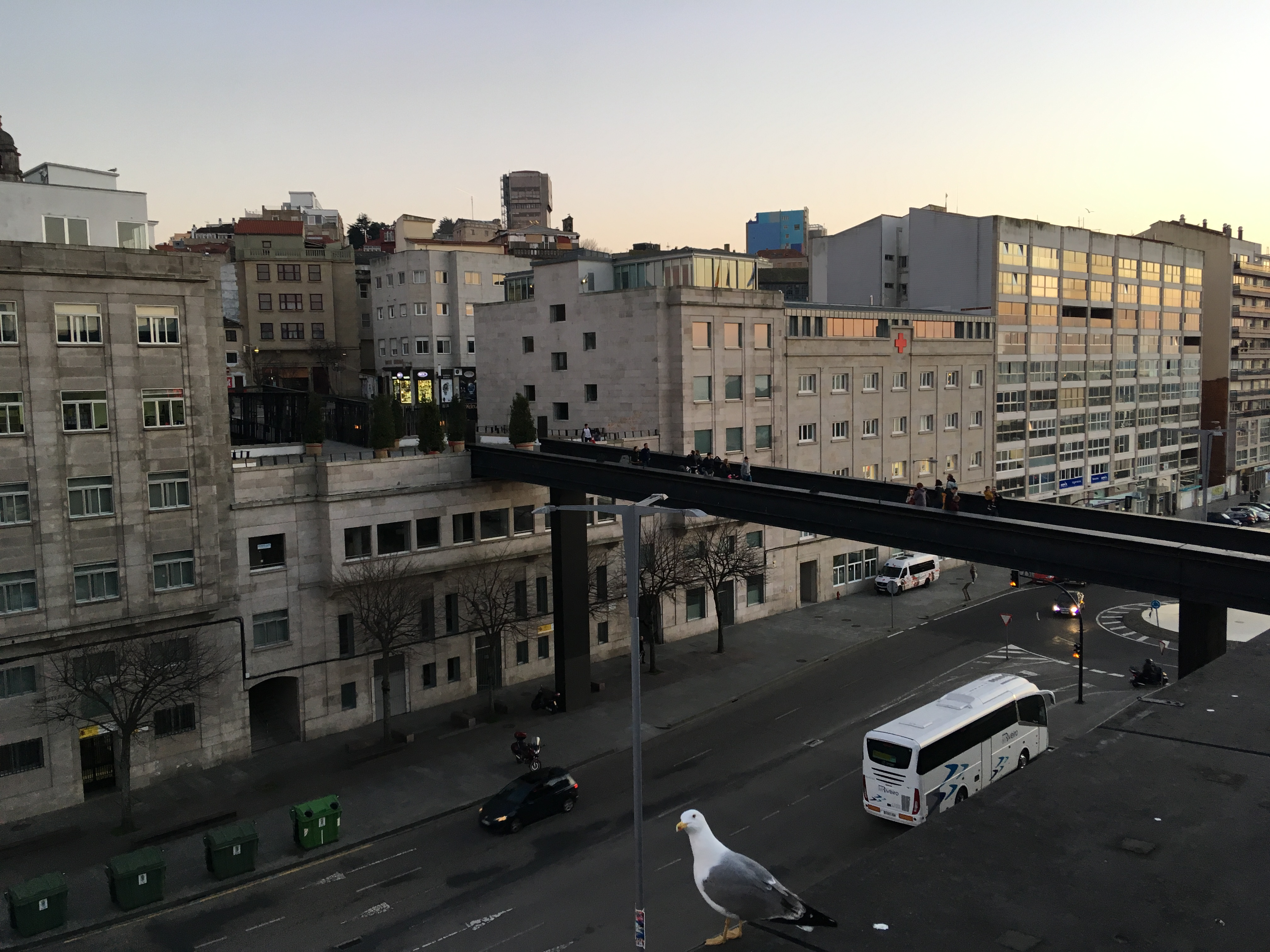
View of the city centre

Historical population
Year	Pop.	±%
1842	18,168	—
1857	29,206	+60.8%
1877	34,593	+18.4%
1887	35,669	+3.1%
1900	46,573	+30.6%
1910	62,570	+34.3%
1920	79,774	+27.5%
1930	97,660	+22.4%
1940	123,105	+26.1%
1950	136,291	+10.7%
1960	145,411	+6.7%
1970	198,815	+36.7%
1981	261,331	+31.4%
1991	276,109	+5.7%
2001	280,186	+1.5%
2011	295,623	+5.5%
2021	294,650	−0.3%
Source: INE

As of 2024, the municipality of Vigo has a population of 295,523, of which 201,018 is in the core city, with an extended metropolitan population of 545,892 in the southern part of the province of Pontevedra, making it Spain's 14th-largest metropolitan area.

As of 2024, the foreign-born population of the city is 41,833, equal to 14.2% of the total population. The main nationalities are Venezuelans (8,385), Colombians (3,868), Argentinians (3,169), Brazilians (3,150), Peruvians (2,534), Portuguese (2,091), and Uruguayans (2,014).

Foreign population by country of birth (2024)
Country	Population
Venezuela	8,385
Colombia	3,868
Argentina	3,169
Brazil	3,150
Peru	2,534
Portugal	2,091
Uruguay	2,014
Cuba	1,436
France	1,300
Mexico	1,148
Germany	1,144
Switzerland	1,017
Paraguay	873
Senegal	781
Romania	657

By language, as of 2013, 7.7% of the population spoke exclusively in Galician, and 51.39% in Spanish; 11.4% spoke in Galician more often than Spanish, and 29.6% more often in Spanish than Galician. This made Vigo the least Galician-speaking city in Galicia.

The creation of Vigo metropolitan area was approved in 2016 and, in addition to Vigo, it originally accounted for the following 13 municipalities: Baiona, Cangas, Fornelos de Montes, Gondomar, Moaña, Mos, Nigrán, Pazos de Borbén, O Porriño, Redondela, Salceda de Caselas, Salvaterra de Miño and Soutomaior. It has been however suspended since its creation. The European Union's Directorate-General for Regional and Urban Policy assigns Vigo a wider functional urban area (FUA), with 21 municipalities and a population of 541,000 inhabitants.

== Administration ==
=== Local government ===
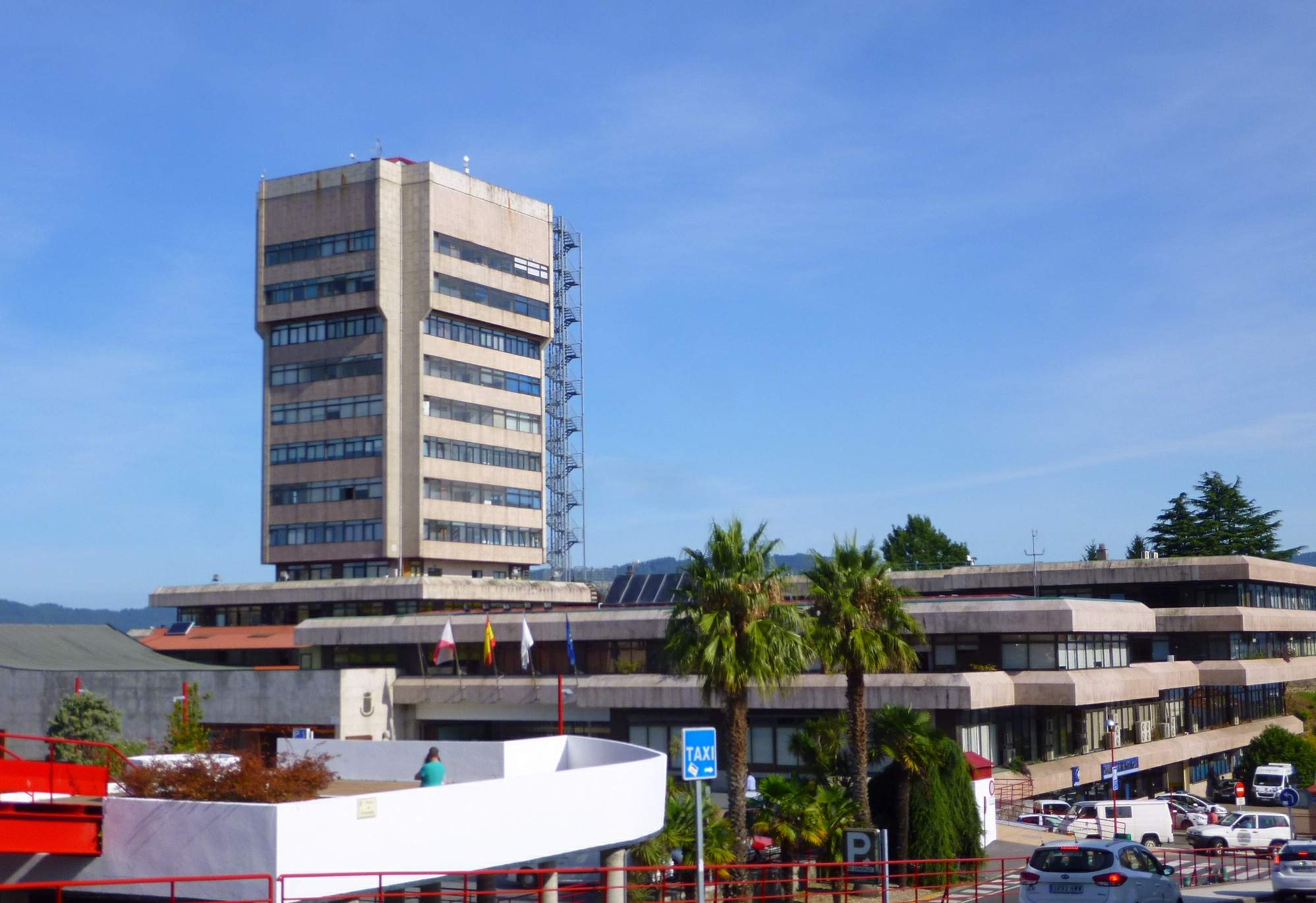
City Hall

The city council (Concello de Vigo) is the body responsible for the governance and administration of the municipality, the lowest level of local government in Spain. The plenary of the concello is formed by 27 elected municipal councillors, who in turn invest the mayor. The council meets at the Casa do Concello at the Praza do Rei.

The last municipal election took place on 28 May 2023, leading to a plenary formed by 19 councillors from the Socialists' Party of Galicia–PSOE, 5 from the People's Party and 3 from the Galician Nationalist Bloc. The current mayor is Abel Caballero of the Spanish Socialist Workers Party), who has won five mandates in a row since becoming mayor in 2007.

=== Administrative subdivisions ===
Vigo is divided into 18 parishes. Seventeen of these correspond to traditional ecclesiastical parishes, while the administrative parish of Vigo Centro encompasses the ecclesiastical parishes of Bouzas, Coia, Freixeiro, San Paio and San Xoan do Monte. Each parish is further subdivided into barrios or neighbourhoods.

Parishes of Vigo
	Place name	Population	Land area in km^{2}	Map of Vigo
1	Alcabre	4,198	1.2	
2	Beade	5,250	7	
3	Bembrive	4,374	9	
4	Cabral	6,654	9.1	
5	Candéan	4,639	5	
6	Castrelos	8,096	2	
7	Comesaña	6,389	3	
8	Coruxo	5,296	9	
9	Lavadores	17,636	6	
10	Matamá	3,569	4.67	
11	Navia	6,269	2.45	
12	Oia	3,935	4	
13	Saiáns	1,150	1.82	
14	Sárdoma	2,452	1.9	
15	Teis	2,188	5	
16	Valadares	5,457	11	
17	Vigo Centro	201,018	14.54	
18	Zamáns	840	7	

The parishes of Bouzas, Lavadores and Teis were their own municipalities before they were incorporated into Vigo.

== Tourism ==
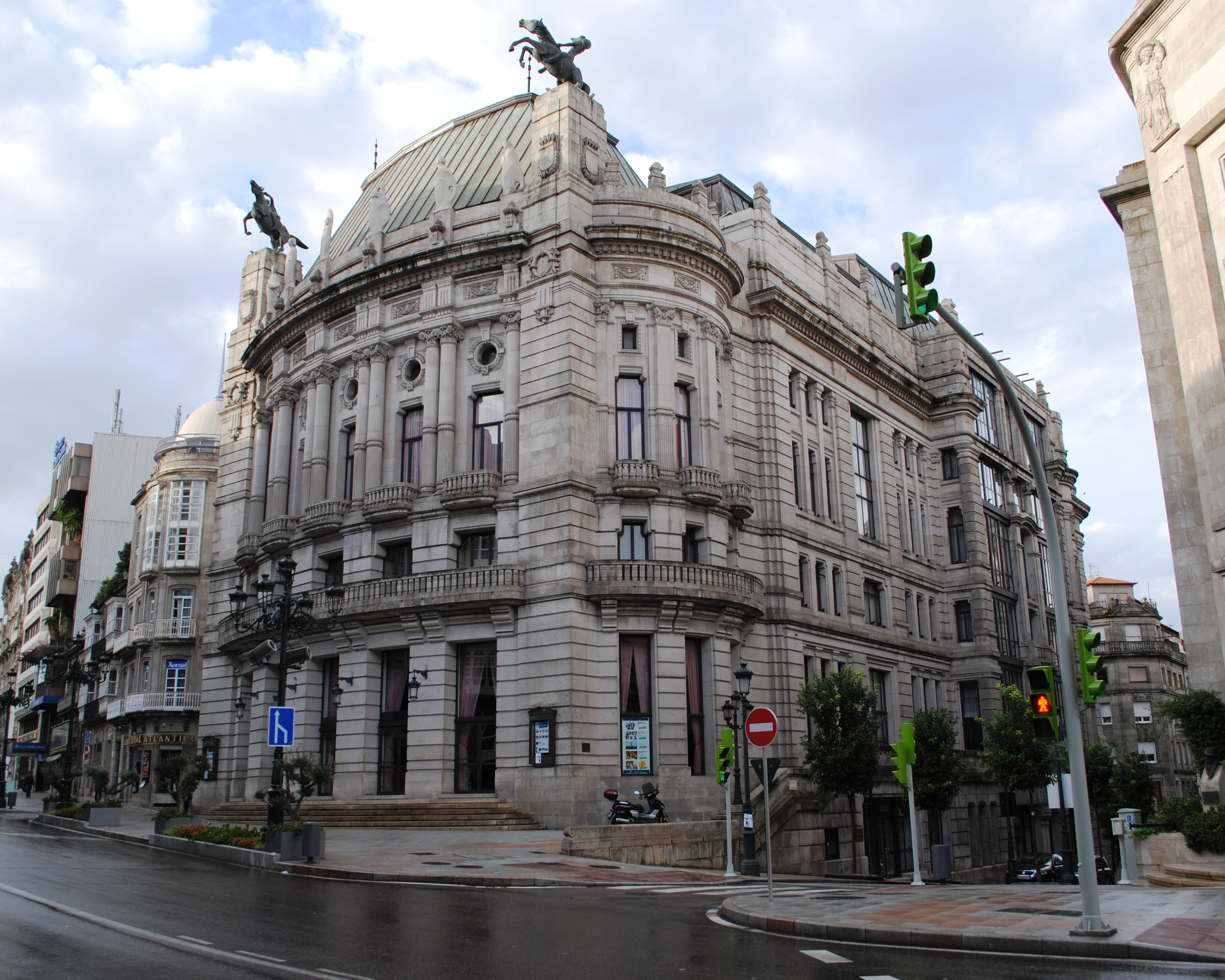
Teatro García Barbón.

Vigo is home to the Co-cathedral of Santa María and several museums, most of which were inaugurated between the late 1990s and early 2000s. Among them are the Museum of Contemporary Art (MARCO) and the Museum of the Sea. The oldest museum is the Quiñones de León Municipal Museum.

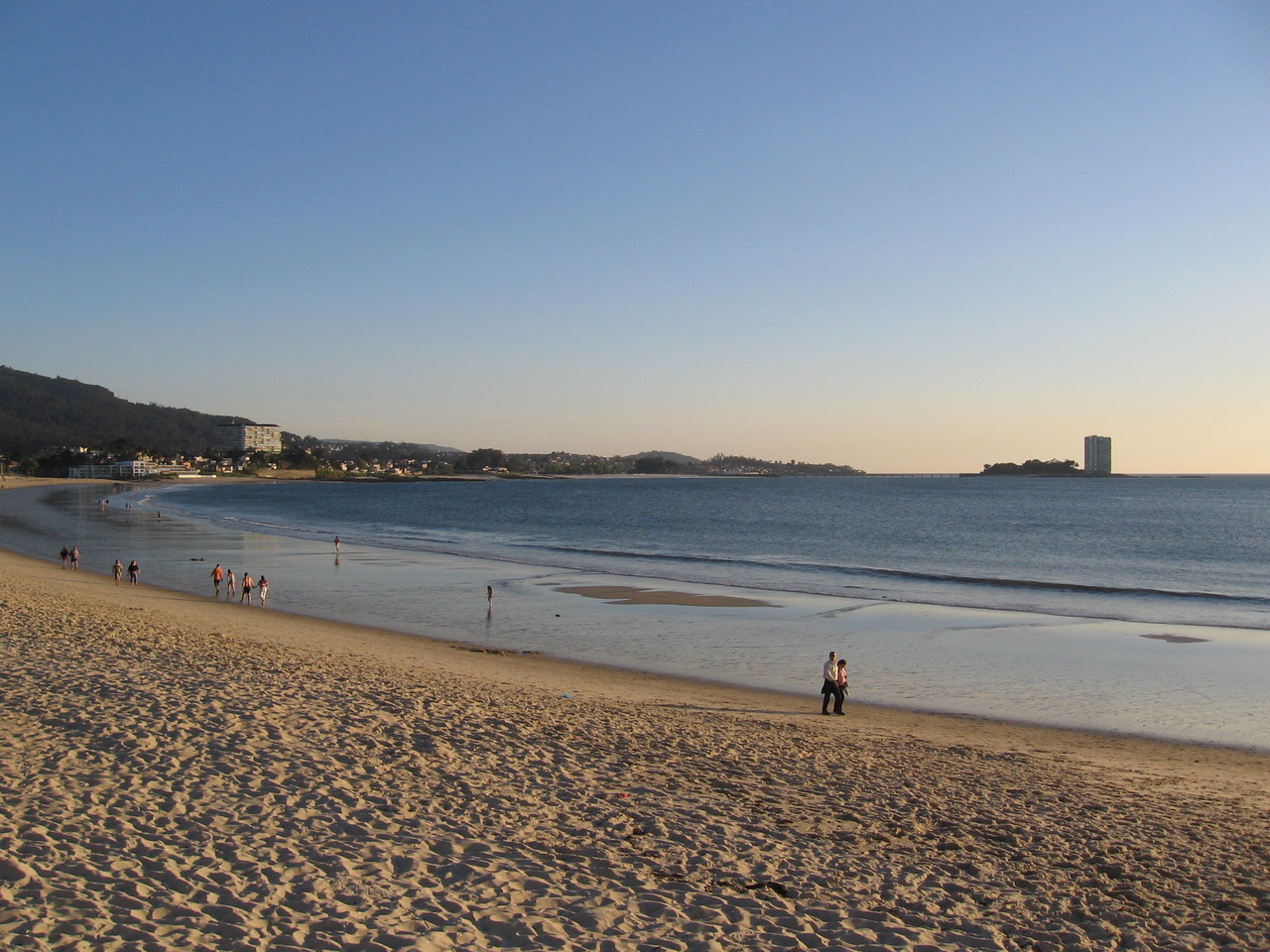
Samil Beach and Toralla island

- Casco Vello (historic centre)
- Porta do Sol, Policarpo Sanz and Alameda (modern centre)
- Príncipe and Urzaiz Streets (commercial area)
- Castro de Vigo ruins
- Castro fortress
- Collegiate church of Santa Maria de Vigo

=== Museums ===
- Naturnova Museum: Museum dedicated to the environment. Interactive contents.
- Museum of the Sea: Museum dedicated to the Sea, and to tinned food and to naval. Important building designed by famous architects Aldo Rossi and Cesar Portela.
- Museum of Contemporary Art, Vigo: One of the most important museums of Contemporary Art in Spain.
- Museum of Castrelos.
- Verbum, Casa das Palabras. A museum dedicated to languages and communication. Important building designed by famous architect Cesar Portela.
- Pinacoteca de Vigo
- Galician Center of Photography
- Ethnographic Museum Liste
- Pedro Barrié de la Maza Foundation

=== Romanesque architecture of Vigo ===
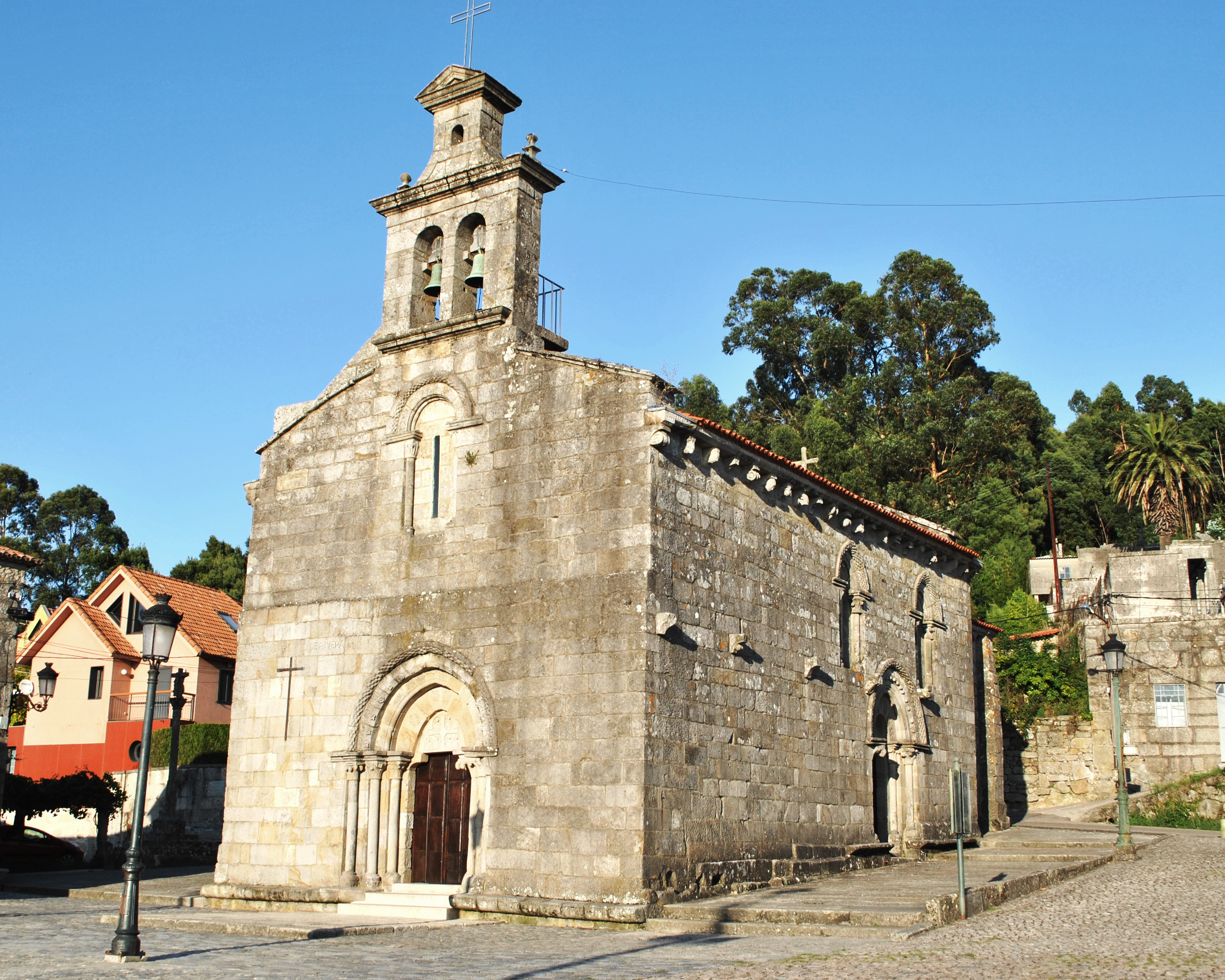
Façade of Church of Santa María de Castrelos in the parish of Castrelos.

The municipality of Vigo is one of the most important Roman centers of Pontevedra. Although within the city one will not find much Romanesque architecture, it can be seen a few kilometers away from the city center. In many of the municipality's neighborhoods and parishes a large number of Roman ruins remain. Such is the importance of the Roman remains in Vigo that many Spanish authors have come to coin the term Romanesque Vigo (románico vigués in Spanish). Vigo retains some interesting examples of Romanesque churches in southern Galicia:

- Santa María de Castrelos
- Santiago de Bembrive
- San Salvador de Coruxo

=== Beaches ===
Throughout the municipality of Vigo there are 47 coves and beaches, including sandy areas with waves for water sports, wild coves, family beaches, nudist beaches and urban beaches. Some of these coves and beaches have various facilities or services for their users, such as sports areas, showers, footbaths, public address system, promenade, Red Cross lifeguard and rescue post, areas adapted for people with disabilities, etc.

In June 2020, the Association for Environmental and Consumer Education (ADEAC) awarded the blue flag distinction to the following 10 beaches in Vigo: Argazada, Canido, Carril, Fontaíña, Muíños de Fortiñón, Punta, Rodas, Samil, Tombo do Gato and Vao.

== Transport ==
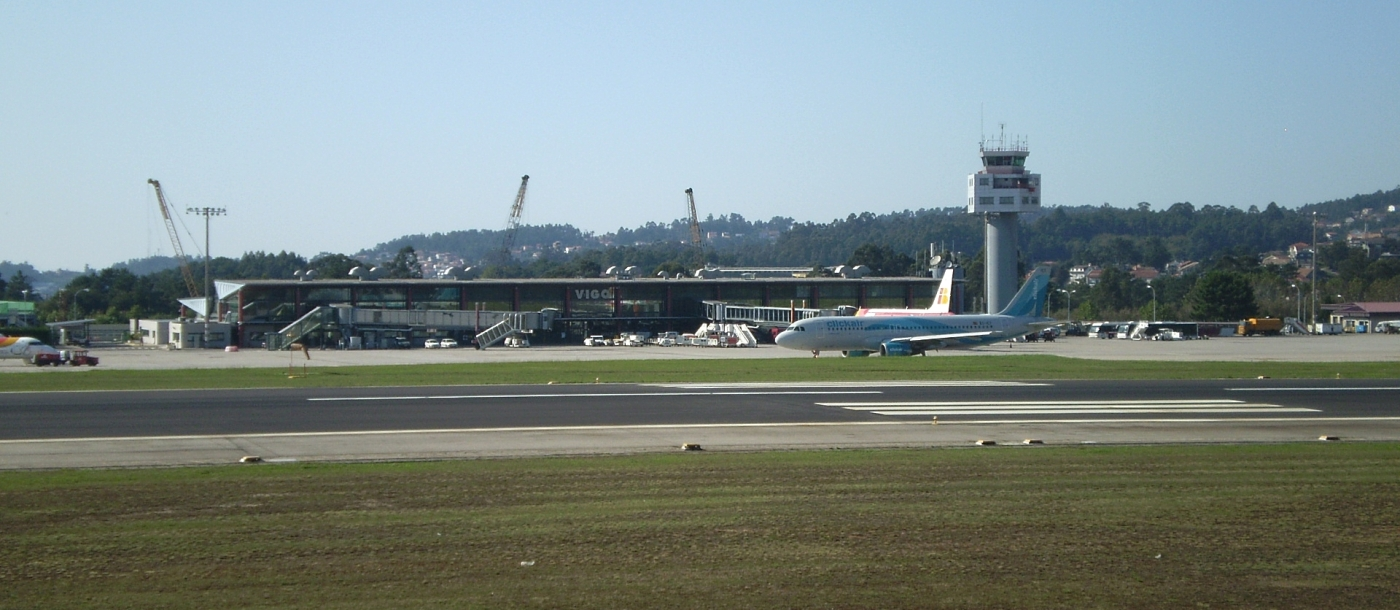
The Vigo domestic airport

Airport

Vigo is served by Vigo-Peinador Airport (VGO/LEVX). Located 12 kilometres to the east of the city of Vigo, straddling halfway the municipalities of Vigo, Redondela and Mos, it offers domestic and international destinations.

Port

A ferry service operates between the Port of Vigo and the towns of Cangas and Moaña as well as the Cíes Islands, 15 kilometres away from the city, part of the Atlantic Islands of Galicia National Park, the only National Park in Galicia, which includes Ons Island in the Pontevedra Bay.

It additionally provides temporary docking for passing cruise ships.

Rail transport

Urzáiz and Guixar railway stations serve Vigo, allowing direct connections to the rest of Galicia as well as to Porto across the border in Portugal.

Road

European route E01 passes through the town. This highway runs south through Lisbon and north to the A Coruña area.

The Autovía das Rías Baixas motorway (A-52) goes inland, east to Ourense and Madrid from O Porriño. A branch of the AP-9 motorway connects Vigo to Portugal in the south and with Pontevedra, Santiago de Compostela, A Coruña and Ferrol in the north.

Public transport

Urban transport is provided by buses by Vitrasa.

== Economy ==
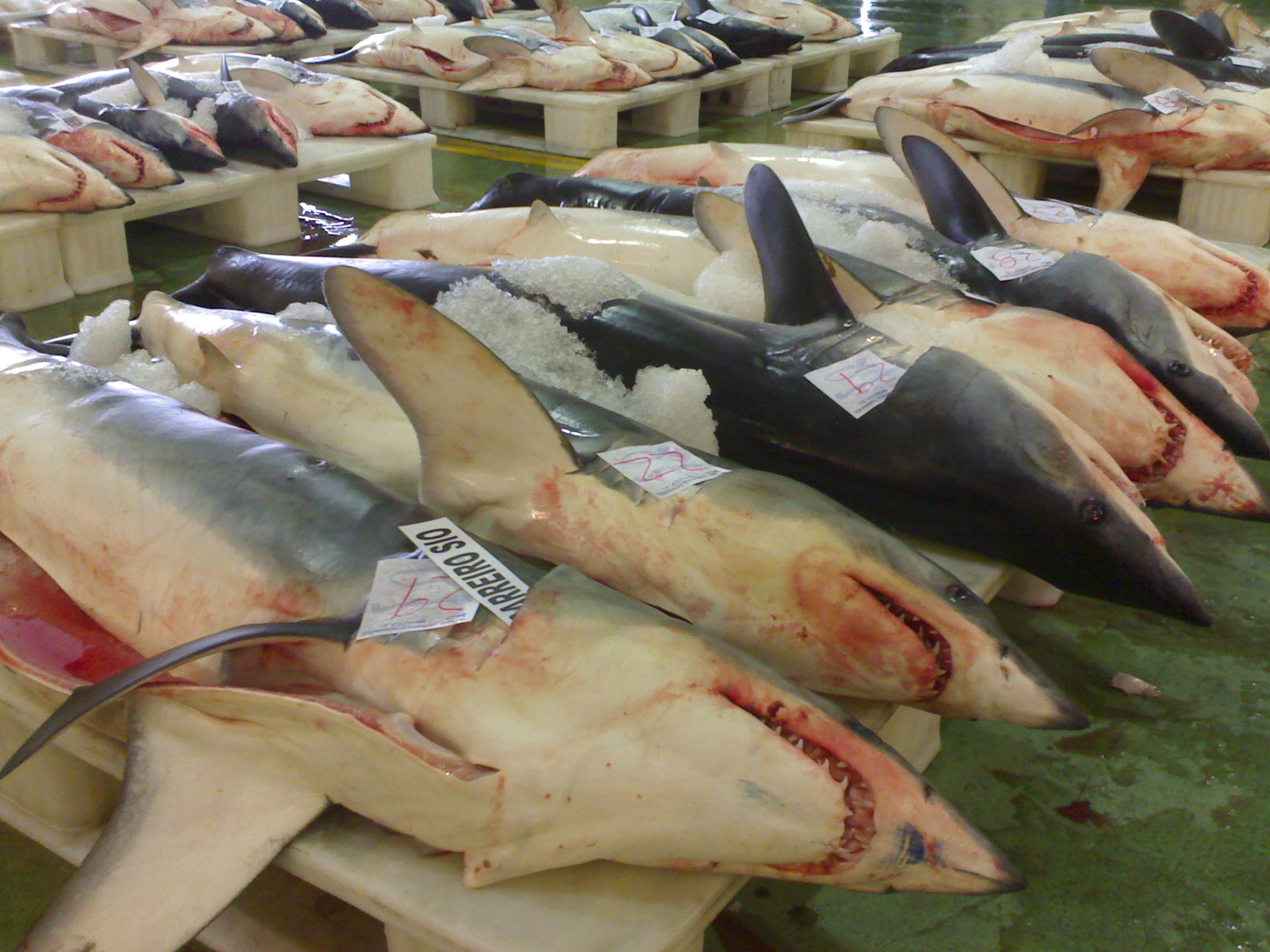
Bonito shark in the fishing port

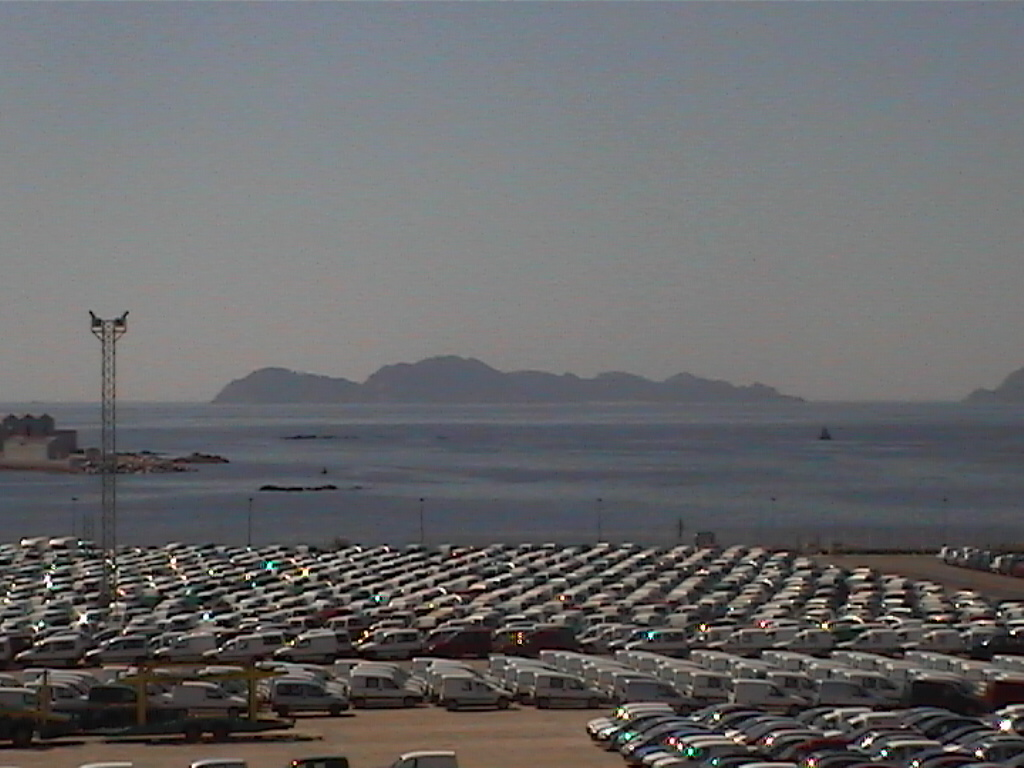
Brand new Citroën panel vans in the port

Vigo is characterized by a diversified economy linked to the fishing sector, industry, trade, tourism and services. It is often considered with A Coruña one of the economic and industrial engines of Galicia.

=== Fishing sector ===
Vigo is the home port of many of the world's largest fishing companies, such as Pescanova and Iberconsa and the most important centre of the Galician canned and processed fish industries.

The fishing sector in Vigo generates more than 32,000 direct and indirect jobs and a turnover of more than 1 billion euros per year. More than 660 fishing vessels are registered in the port of Vigo, making it one of the main ports for the marketing of fresh fish for human consumption in the world, with around 800,000 tonnes per year.

Vigo regularly hosts congresses and trade fairs related to industrial fishing, such as the World Tuna Conference (biannually), Conxemar (annually), or the World Fishing Exhibition (which was held periodically from 1973 to 2009).

Vigo is home of the European Fisheries Control Agency.

=== Industry ===
Vigo is one of the leading industrial areas in Galicia, with a car factory, shipyards, and auxiliary industry in both automotive and marine sectors. Situated in Vigo since 1958, the Stellantis Plant is one of the largest employers in the region. In 2007, it produced a total of 545,000 vehicles, of which more than 82% were sold outside Spain. Biotech and other advanced industries play an important role on Vigo's economy. The city is also the namesake of VIGO Industries, an American manufacturer of kitchen and bathroom fixtures founded in 2008.

The publishing industry in Galician is prominent in the city, with Editorial Galaxia and Editorial Xerais.

=== Port of Vigo ===
The Port of Vigo covers a length of more than 20 km and offers more than 9 km of docks. The largest port traffic is general freight, highlighting container traffic, RO-RO of vehicles (the second in Spain in Ro-Ro traffic for new vehicles), natural stone and granite (the first of Spain in granite traffic), wood and preserved food.

== Education ==
The main campus of the University of Vigo is located on top of one of the mountains that surrounds the town, in the parish of Zamáns. The local transportation service Vitrasa runs a shuttle service connecting the campus with the town. The majority of the students of the university come from Vigo itself and from other towns and villages in Galicia and can choose from a wide range of studies, with a focus on ocean studies and engineering.

The University of Vigo was founded in 1990 as split from the University of Santiago de Compostela and has two additional campuses located in Pontevedra and Ourense. The Zamáns Campus features several buildings that constitute excellent examples of modern architecture that blends in with the shape of the mountain in which it is located. These buildings were projected by the likes of Enric Miralles, Alfonso Penelas, Pilar Díez y Alberto Noguerol César Portela, Gabriel Santos Zas and César Padrón.

== Culture ==
=== Language ===
Vigo, as a Galician city, has two official languages: Galician and Spanish, the latter being the most used nowadays.

=== Music ===
A movida viguesa was a hedonistic cultural movement akin to the Movida madrileña that took place in Vigo during the 1980s triggered by the explosion of liberties after the death of dictator Francisco Franco. The most important artists of this postmodern movement were musicians; particularly punk and new wave bands such as Siniestro Total, Golpes Bajos, Aerolíneas Federales, Semen Up or Os Resentidos.

At the moment, the city still has notorious bands like Iván Ferreiro (ex-singer of Los Piratas) and Mon.

=== Media and entertainment ===
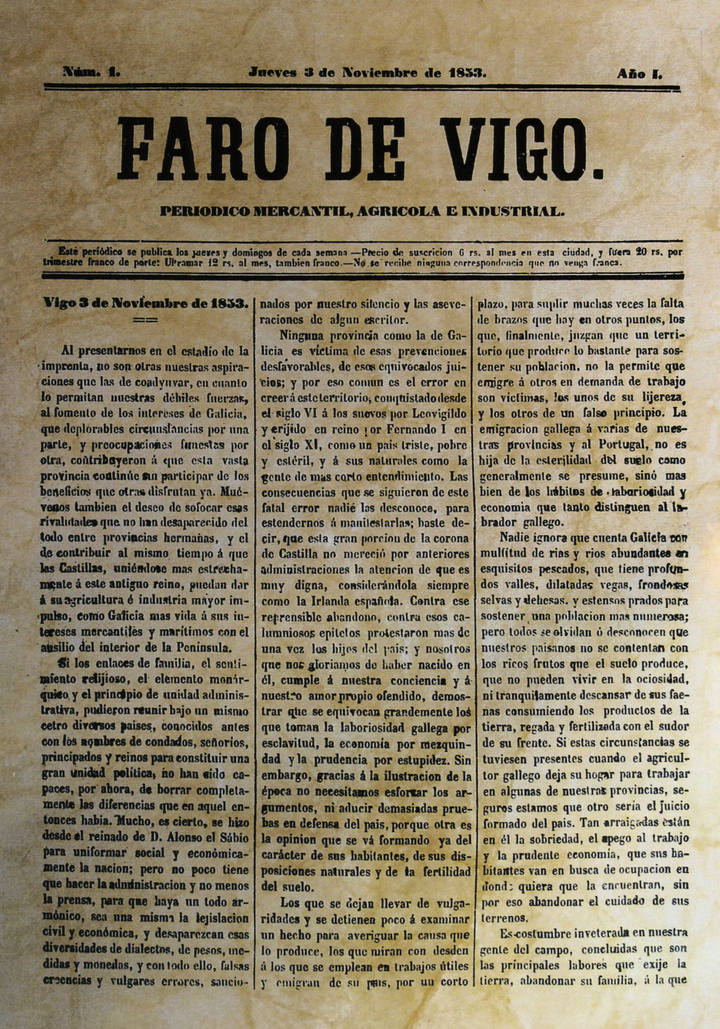
Frontpage of an 1853 issue of the Faro de Vigo.

Vigo has two daily newspapers; the Faro de Vigo, the oldest newspaper in Spain still in circulation, and the Atlántico Diario, a little local newspaper. There also exist a local edition of the Galician main headline newspaper "La Voz de Galicia". Vigo was also the main location of historic newspaper such as the weekly newspaper "A Nosa Terra", which was published in Galician and is now defunct.

Vigo also has a TV local station: "Televigo". Although not very popular, it is known thanks to the town mayor, Abel Caballero, who has a show in which he answers to questions and inquiries submitted by the citizens.

Radio coverage includes RNE —the Spanish public radio network—, Radio Galega —a Galician government-supported radio in Galician language—, and some private-owned stations ("Radio Vigo - Cadena Ser", "Radio Voz Vigo", "Radio ECCA", and so on).

Around the 2000s, several online news websites emerged (for example, "riadevigo.com") besides of the traditional media homepages. Vigo also participated in the Europeanwide free newspapers rush led by "Metro" and some free journals were published in the 1990s and 2000s: "20 minutos", "Gaceta Universitaria", "Redacción Xove", etcetera. "España Exterior" is also printed in Vigo.

The locally produced award-winning feature movie Mondays In The Sun (original title Los lunes al sol) depicts the life of several men who have lost their work at the Port of Vigo. This film is not based on a single individual's experiences but on the perceived collective experiences of many local port workers.

=== Sports ===
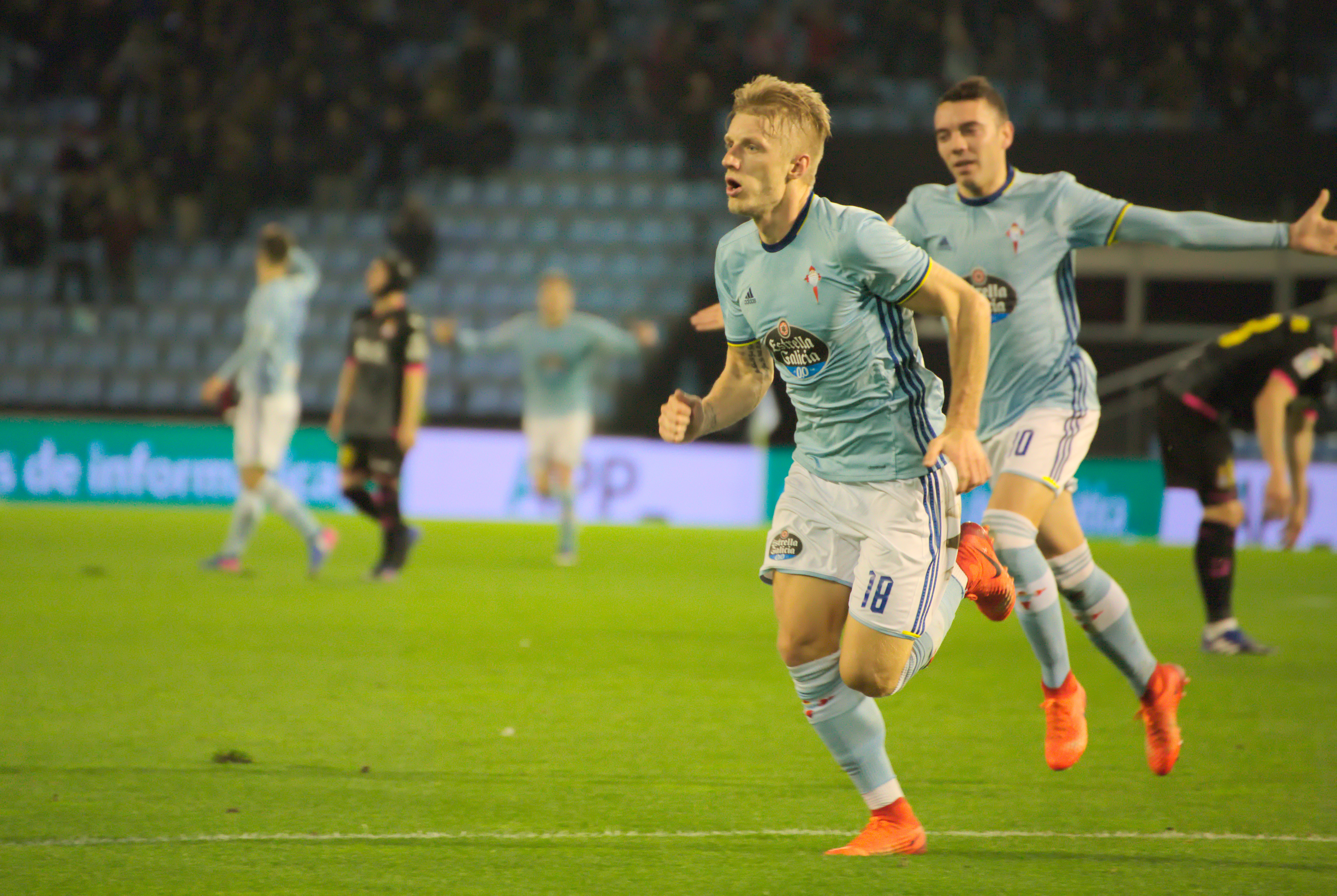
Celta de Vigo match in 2017

The women's basketball team Celta de Vigo Baloncesto is based in Vigo. They have won the Liga Femenina de Baloncesto, the top tier of Spanish women's basketball, five times, most recently in 2000. In the 2011–12 season, and following a number of economic problems, the team was relegated to the second division.

Vigo is home to the football team RC Celta de Vigo, which plays in La Liga, Spain's top division, as of the 2026–27 season. The women's team from the area, Federación Viguesa de Peñas Recreativas El Olivo, was the first team from Galicia to compete in the Women's Primera División.

The Rías Baixas offer an excellent environment for nautical sports. Institutions such as the Real Club Nautico de Vigo (RCNV), founded in 1906, and the Liceo Marítimo de Bouzas (LMB), founded in 1907, are good examples of promotion of the nautical sports, especially sailing.

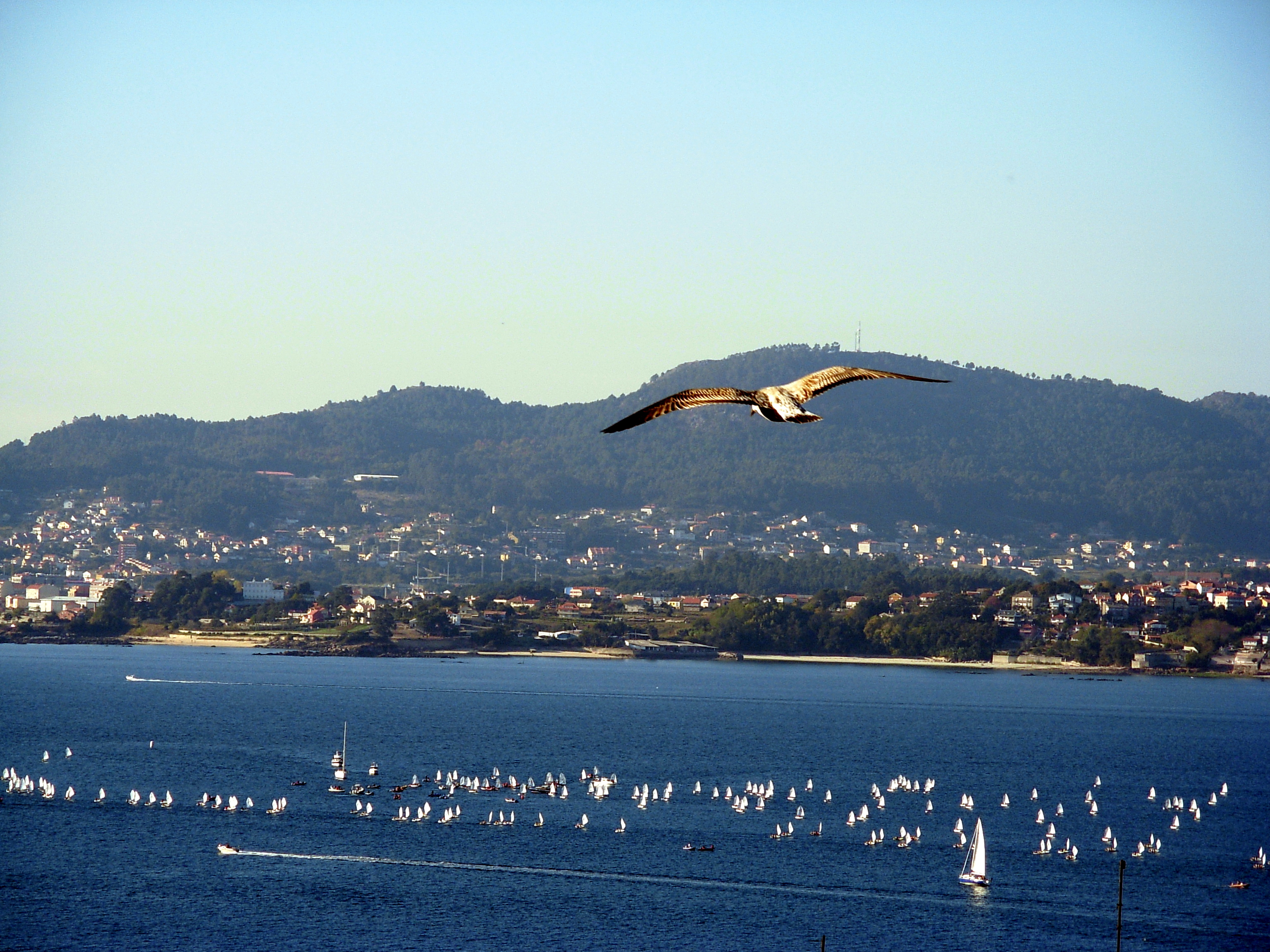
Regatta in the Ria de Vigo.

The RCNV organises important events like Atlantic Week, which in September 2006 included the World Championship of the Platu 25 class. Every August, the RCNV also organises one of the largest sailboat races in the Iberian peninsula: the Regata Rías Baixas. In 2006 more than 130 different boats participated.

The Liceo Maritimo de Bouzas (LMB) is a yacht club which counts around 400 associates. The LMB has a long and intense history of sailing and recreational fishing. The LMB organizes two important regattas in the Galician sailing calendar: the Regata Vila de Bouzas and a Regata de Solitarios y a Dos.

The Regata Vila de Bouzas honours the neighbourhood where the LMB is located. The Regata de Solitarios y a Dos is for crews of one and two members. It is a difficult race with two stages; the first consists of a race through the coastal bay of Vigo while the second stage is a longer race around the Cies Islands (and/or Ons Islands).

== Notable people ==
- Amparo Alonso Betanzos, Spanish computer scientist
- Dores André, ballet dancer
- José María de Azcárate, art historian, author, researcher, curator, and professor, specializing in medieval Castilian art and Renaissance sculpture. Born in Vigo.
- Antonio M. Pérez, CEO of Eastman Kodak
- Carlos Núñez, musician
- Méndez Núñez, military officer
- Concepcion Picciotto, peace activist
- Francisco Marcó del Pont, last governor of Chile under Spanish rule
- Iago Falque, footballer
- Iván Ferreiro, singer-songwriter
- Rosario Hernández Diéguez, newspaper hawker and trade unionist
- Manuel Manquiña, actor
- Pedro Alonso, actor
- Martín Codax, poet
- Domingo Villar, author
- Ramón Souto, composer
- Ricardo Mella, anarchist activist
- Ignacio Ramonet Miguez, journalist and activist, editor-in-chief of Le Monde Diplomatique (1991–2008)
- Roberto Losada Rodríguez, footballer
- Serafín Avendaño, painter
- Manuel Porzner, cyclist
- Manuela Velasco, actress
- Fernando Malvar-Ruiz, choral conductor, clinician, and educator
- María Oruña, novelist and columnist

== In popular culture ==
- Vigo Bay is one of the settings for Jules Verne's 1870 novel Twenty Thousand Leagues Under the Seas. The book's protagonist, Captain Nemo, draws his wealth and the funding for his submarine Nautilus from the cargoes of the galleons sunk by the British during the Battle of Vigo Bay in 1702. They are depicted as still having their treasure and as being easily accessible to divers.
- In the novel and the movie Das Boot, set during World War II, the German submarine U-96 stops in Vigo under cover of darkness to resupply (in secret, as Spain is neutral) from a German cargo ship stationed there for this purpose.

== International relations ==
=== Twin towns – sister cities ===
Vigo is twinned with:

- Buenos Aires, Argentina (1992)
- Caracas, Venezuela
- Celaya, Mexico
- Lorient, France (1983)
- Nantes, France
- Narsaq, Greenland (1984)
- Las Palmas de Gran Canaria, Spain
- Porto, Portugal (1986)
- Qingdao, China
- Victoria de Durango, Mexico

== See also ==
- Garcia Barbon Theatre
