= Ramón Souto =

Spanish composer (born 1976)

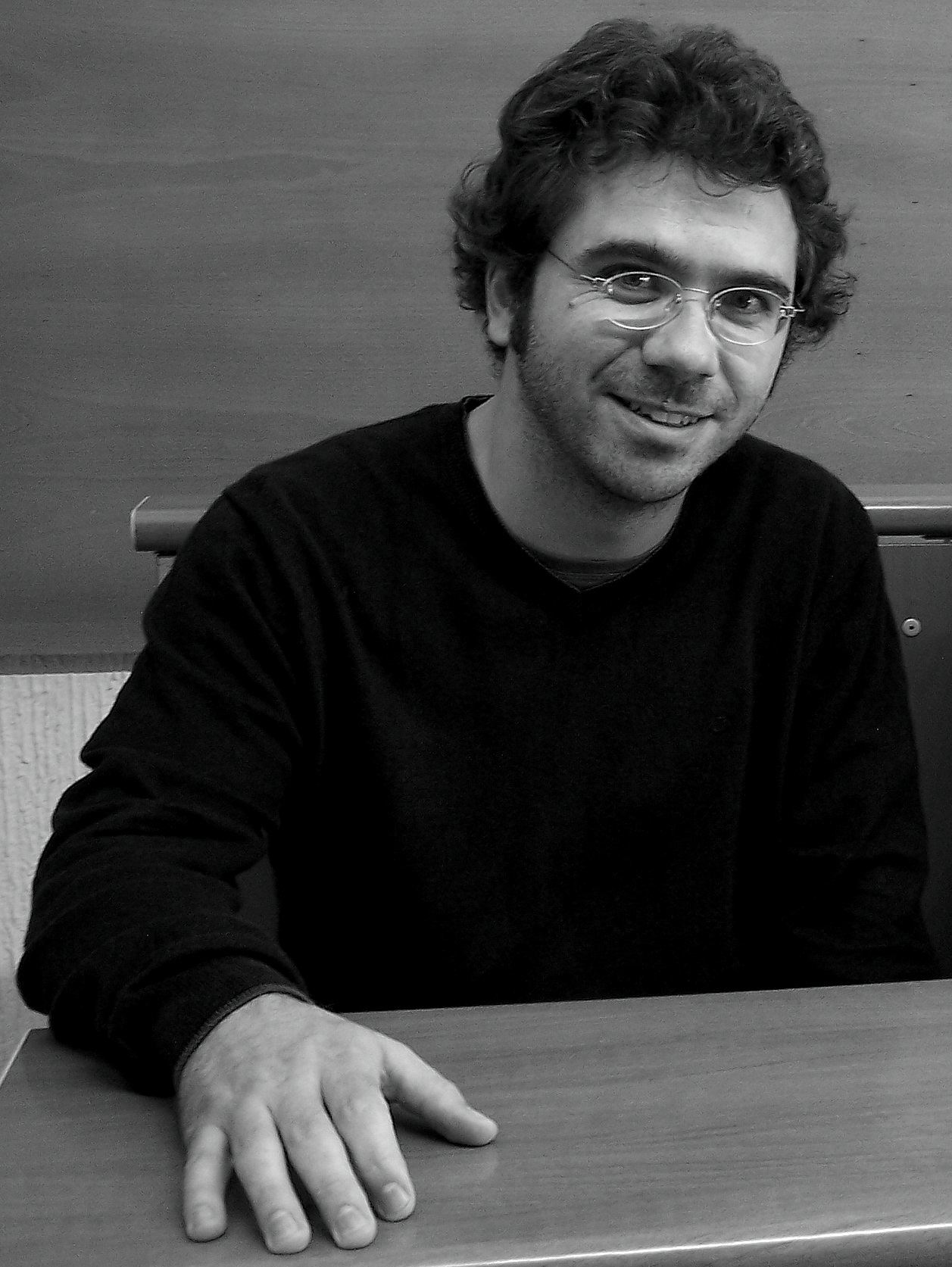

Background information
- Born: Ramón Souto Caride; April 21, 1976 (age 49); Vigo, Spain
- Occupations: Musician, composer
- Years active: 2003-present
- Website: www.ramonsouto.com

Ramón Souto Caride (born April 21, 1976, in Vigo, Spain) is a Spanish composer. He is the founder of the Spanish chamber orchestra Vertixe Sonora Ensemble.

== Biography ==
Caride graduated from C.S.M. Vigo and C.L.E.M. Barcelona and went on to collaborate with the theater group Artello, making music for their shows fábula and polgariño. He then joined the experimental platform BAUR and participated in events that involved free improvisation, progressive rock, and free jazz. At the same time he presented his work in meetings and major festivals such as the Encuentro de Compositores Iberoamericanos Injuve, Villafranca, Acanthes and Festival de Música Española de Cádiz. The latter received unanimous recognition and awards including the mention of honor in the 2008 Ossia International Composition Competition (New York).

Caride has collaborated with performers such as Yi-Chung Chen, Juan Carlos Garvayo and Donatienne Michel-Dansac, and poets like Jorge Riechmann.

He is currently professor of music at the IES de Mos (Mos, Spain).

== Work ==
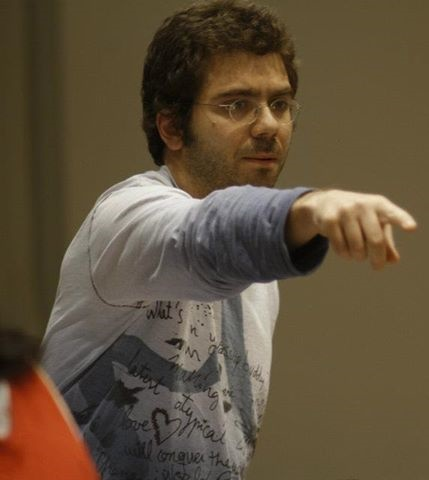
Ramón Souto in a concert.

- Orchestra: Todo lo que le hice a TORTOLA aquella noche.
- Instrumental Ensemble: Sexteto, In Sospenso, Fricción, Construcción de un verso, Hikmet habitado.
- Pieces by one instrument: Mi gran dolor americano.
- Vocal pieces:
  - Mixed a cappella: Coro: 2 choral poems, first 6 poems, playground and Quer pouco .
  - Voice and piano: 2 poems and 5 songs.
- Electro: Backettianas 1 and 2.
- Music Theatre: In fable and polgariño.
- Projects Vertixe Sonora Ensemble

== Filmography ==
- Correspondencias Sonoras (2013) by Manuel del Río.
