= Vigo metropolitan area =

Vigo metropolitan area Área metropolitana de Vigo
- Urban area
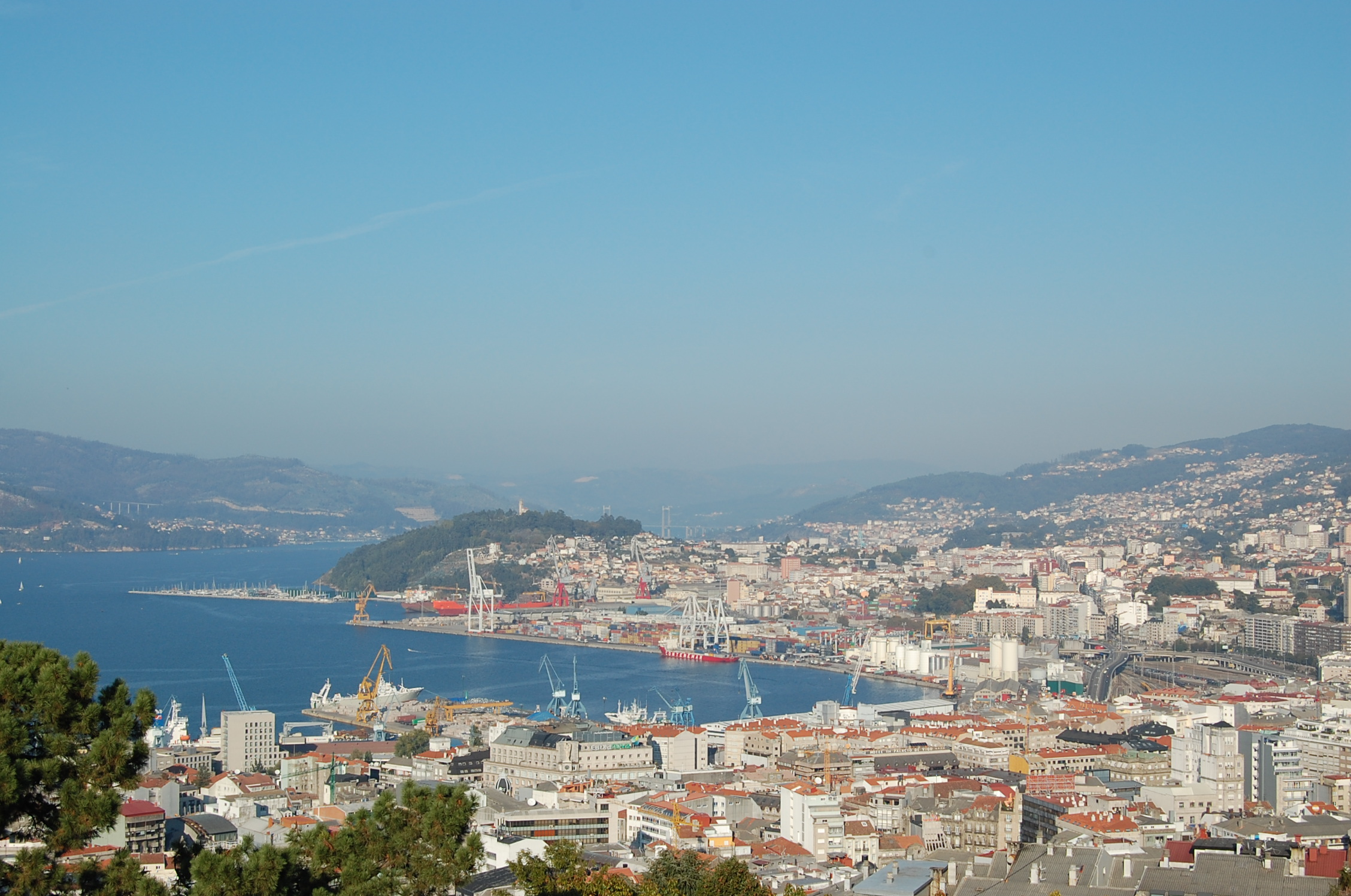
- Skyline of Vigo

- Vigo metropolitan area in Pontevedra province
- Country: Spain
- Largest city: Vigo

Area
  - Metro: 745 km^{2} (288 sq mi)

Population
  - Metro: 481,194
  - Metro density: 646/km^{2} (1,670/sq mi)

GDP
  - Metro: €20.125 billion

The Vigo metropolitan area located in Galicia (Spain) is formed by the city of Vigo and the surrounding municipalities of Baiona, Cangas, Fornelos de Montes, Gondomar, Moaña, Mos, Nigrán, O Porriño, Pazos de Borbén, Redondela, Salceda de Caselas, Salvaterra de Miño and Soutomaior.

== See also ==
- List of metropolitan areas in Spain
