= List of municipalities in Pontevedra =

Map of Spain with the province of Pontevedra highlighted

Municipal Map of Pontevedra Province with comarcas in different colours

This is a list of the 61 municipalities in the province of Pontevedra in the autonomous community of Galicia, Spain.

The Galician name is the sole official form of the name; older or informal texts may use Castilian forms or spellings.

== List ==
Municipality	Population 2001	Population 2011	Population 2018	Comarca
Agolada	3,882	2,773	2,370	O Deza
Arbo	3,742	3,130	2,637	A Paradanta
Baiona	10,931	11,940	12,134	Vigo
Barro	3,468	3,713	3,716	Pontevedra
Bueu	12,350	12,339	12,148	O Morrazo
Caldas de Reis	9,477	10,013	9,860	Caldas
Cambados	13,385	14,038	13,814	O Salnés
Campo Lameiro	2,235	2,017	1,806	Pontevedra
Cangas	23,981	26,332	26,487	O Morrazo
A Cañiza	7,194	5,471	5,173	A Paradanta
Catoira	3,451	3,499	3,349	Caldas
Cerdedo-Cotobade	6,987	6,245	5,815	Tabeirós - Terra de Montes / Pontevedra
Covelo	3,743	2,880	2,417	A Paradanta
Crecente	2,677	2,345	2,032	O Paradanta
Cuntis	5,530	4,998	4,710	Caldas
Dozón	1,710	1,271	1,110	O Deza
A Estrada	22,308	21,626	20,661	Tabeirós - Terra de Montes
Forcarei	4,801	3,934	3,451	Tabeirós - Terra de Montes
Fornelos de Montes	2,066	1,900	1,640	Vigo
Gondomar	12,176	14,086	14,236	Vigo
O Grove	11,035	11,265	10,700	O Salnés
A Guarda	9,835	10,419	10,013	O Baixo Miño
A Illa de Arousa	4,870	4,975	4,958	O Salnés
Lalín	19,869	20,326	20,103	O Deza
A Lama	2,947	2,891	2,430	Pontevedra
Marín	24,997	25,357	24,362	O Morrazo
Meaño	5,426	5,451	5,315	O Salnés
Meis	5,017	4,939	4,776	O Salnés
Moaña	17,887	19,277	19,448	O Morrazo
Mondariz	5,185	4,847	4,496	O Condado
Mondariz-Balneario	693	678	618	O Condado
Moraña	4,285	4,410	4,200	Caldas
Mos	14,127	15,194	15,142	Vigo
As Neves	4,478	4,280	3,892	O Condado
Nigrán	16,110	17,870	17,723	Vigo
Oia	2,995	3,100	3,018	O Baixa Miño
Pazos de Borbén	3,052	3,148	2,980	Vigo
Poio	14,271	16,642	17,018	Pontevedra
Ponte Caldelas	5,921	5,738	5,491	Pondevedra
Ponteareas	19,011	23,295	22,854	O Condado
Pontecesures	2,940	3,132	3,037	Caldas
Pontevedra	74,942	82,346	82,802	Pontevedra
O Porriño	15,960	18,033	19,740	Vigo
Portas	3,205	3,073	2,984	Caldas
Redondela	29,003	29,947	29,194	Vigo
Ribadumia	4,161	5,147	5,069	O Salnés
Rodeiro	4,229	2,920	2,509	O Deza
O Rosal	5,923	6,519	6,249	O Baixa Miño
Salceda de Caselas	6,335	8,810	9,146	Vigo
Salvaterra de Miño	8,073	9,542	9,691	O Condado
Sanxenxo	16,098	17,560	17,212	O Salnés
Silleda	9,089	9,108	8,698	O Deza
Soutomaior	5,405	7,274	7,305	Vigo
Tomiño	11,371	13,645	13,464	O Baixo Miño
Tui	16,042	17,295	16,902	O Baixo Miño
Valga	6,196	6,051	5,927	Caldas
Vigo	280,186	295,623	293,642	Vigo
Vila de Cruces	6,928	6,073	5,273	O Deza
Vilaboa	5,735	6,033	5,954	Pontevedra
Vilagarcía de Arousa	33,496	37,493	37,519	O Salnés
Vilanova de Arousa	10,333	10,600	10,352	O Salnés

== See also ==
- Geography of Galicia
- Geography of Spain
- List of cities in Spain
