= Salvaterra de Miño =

Salvaterra de Miño Salvatierra de Miño (Spanish)
- Municipality
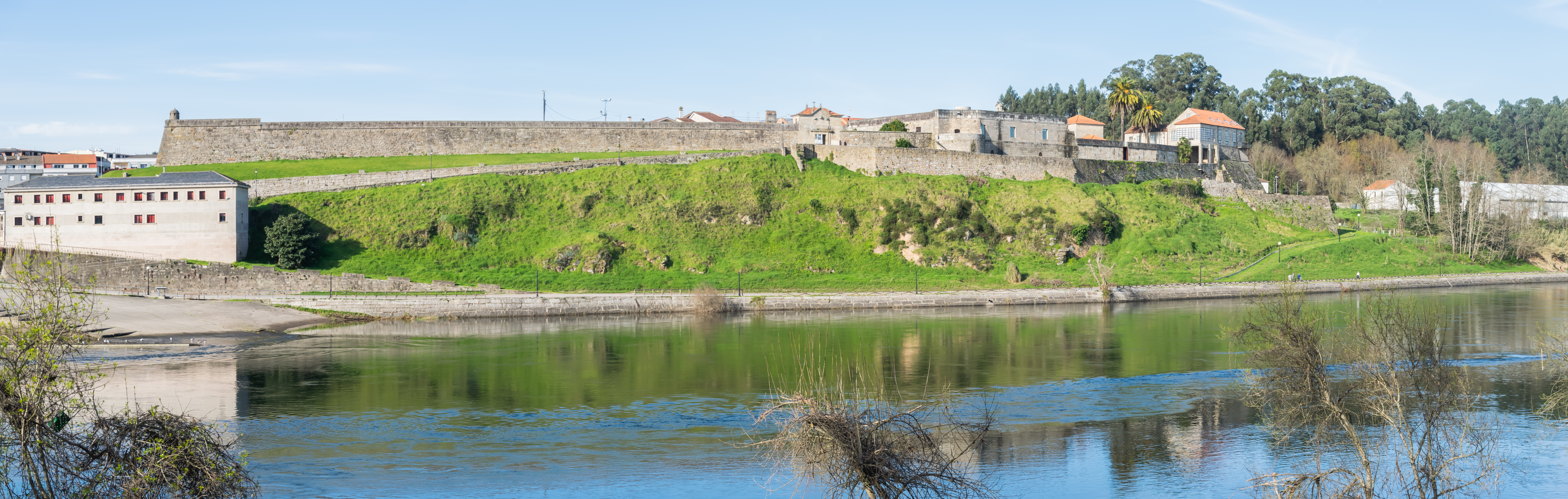
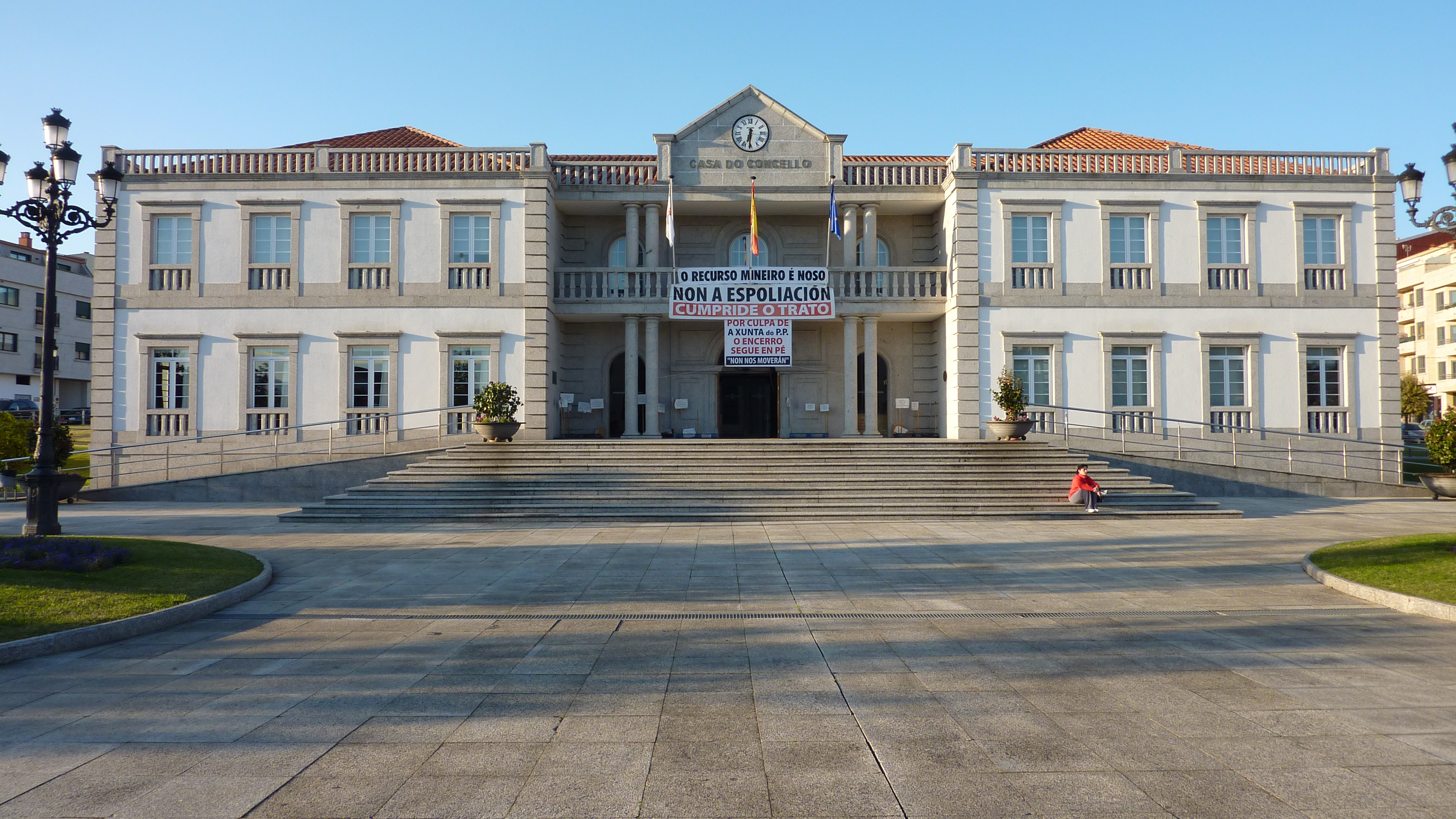
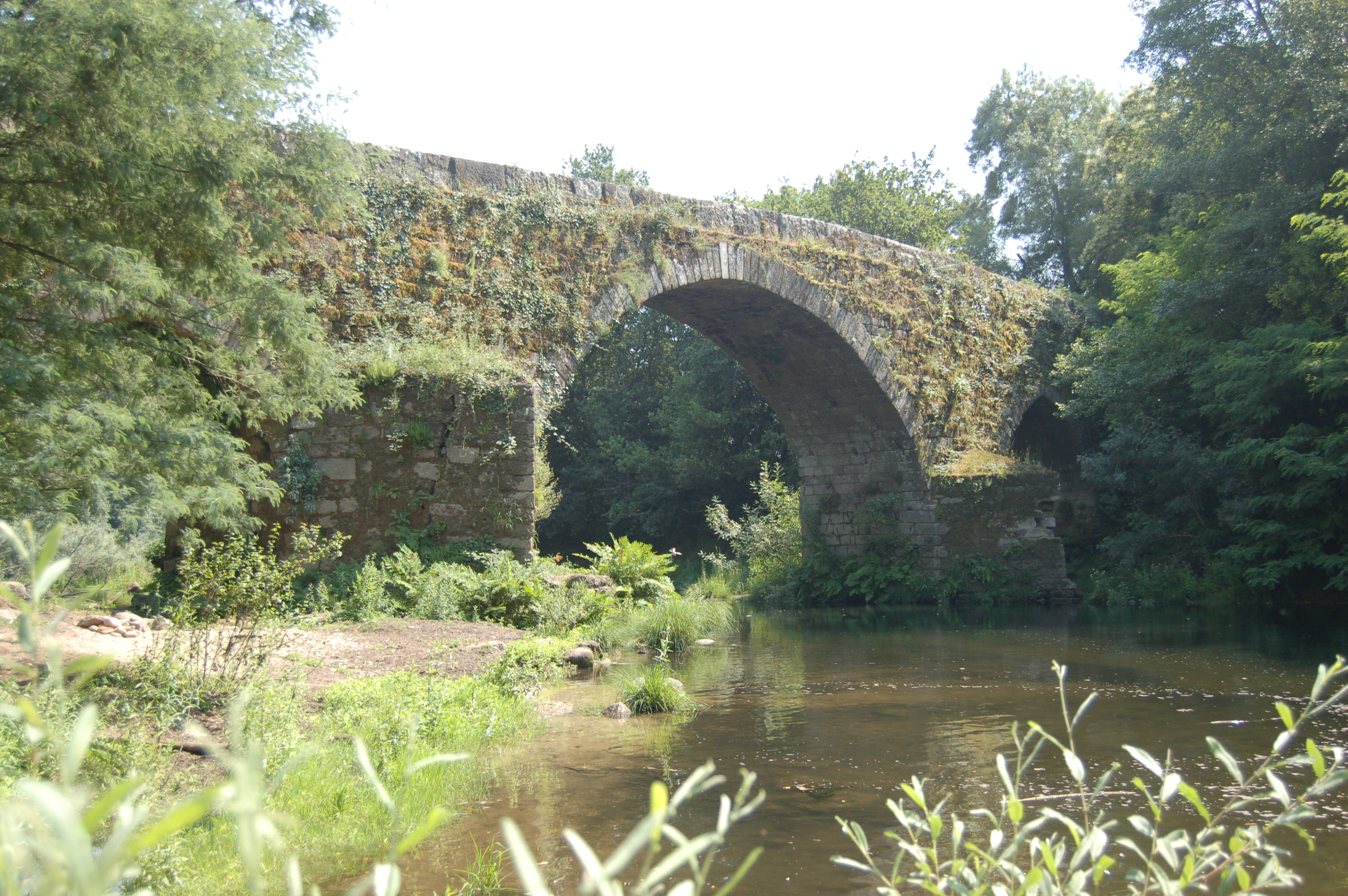
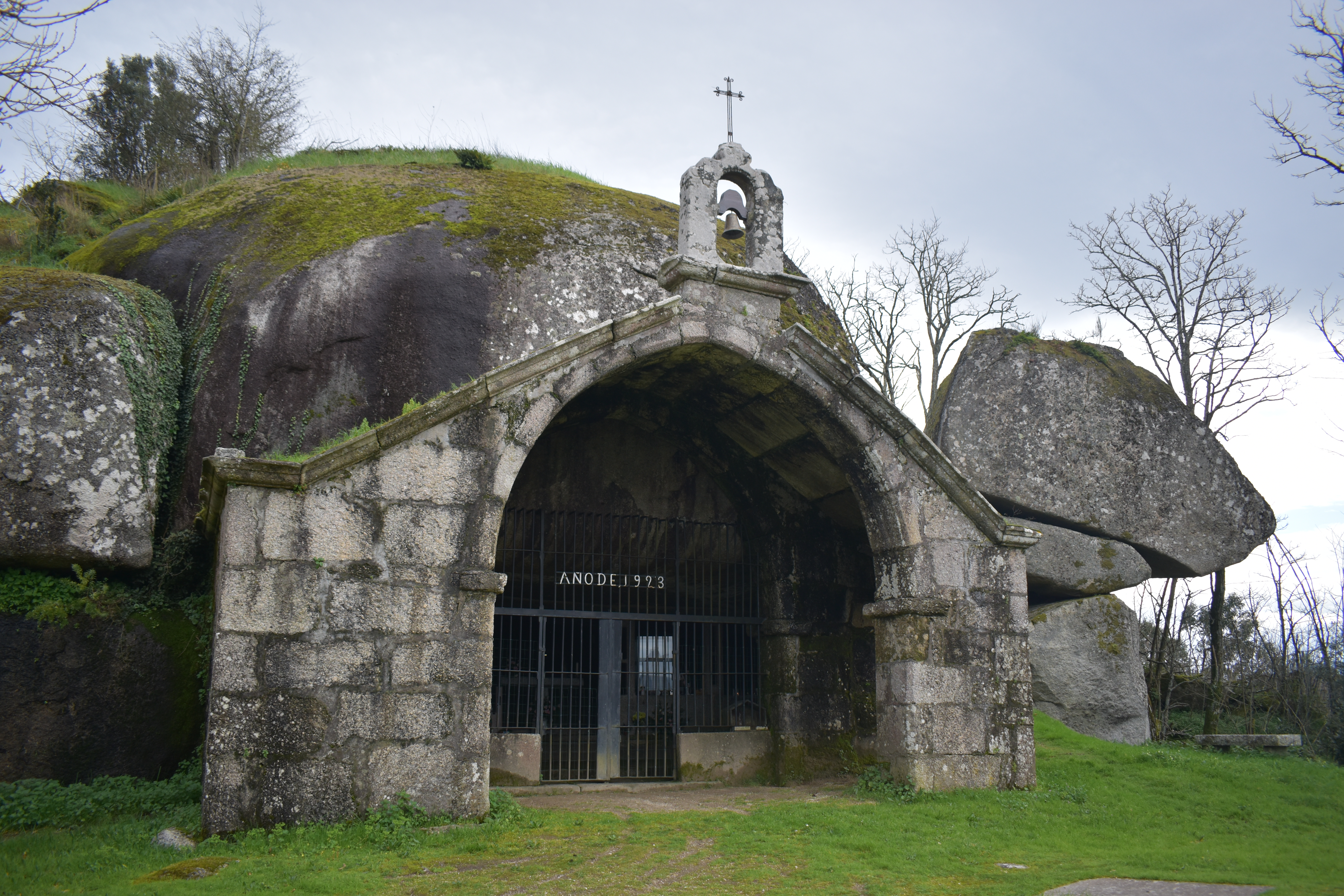
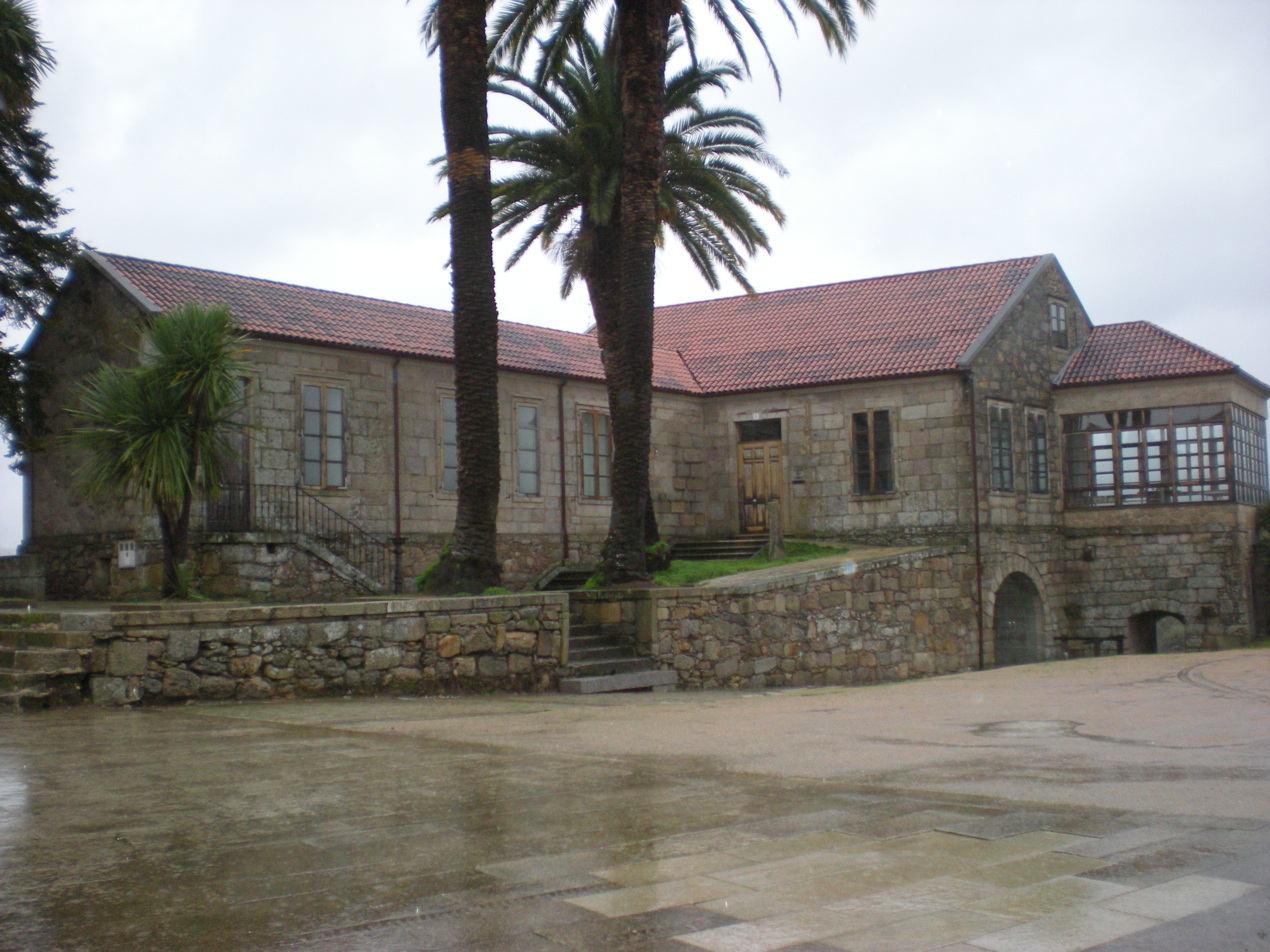
- Fortress of Salvaterra and the Miño River Salvaterra Town Hall Fillaboa Bridge Chapel of Our Lady of the Assumption Pazo de Dona Urraca

- Coat of arms
- Interactive map of Salvaterra de Miño
- Location within Galicia Location within Spain
- Coordinates: 42°04′59″N 08°29′53″W
- Country: Spain
- Autonomous community: Galicia
- Province: Pontevedra
- County: O Condado
- Municipal charter: 1228; 798 years ago
- Name change: 1916, 1983
- Parishes: Alxén, Arantei, Cabreira, Corzáns, Fiolledo, Fornelos, Leirado, Lira, Lourido, Meder, Oleiros, Pesqueiras, Porto, Salvaterra, Soutolobre, Uma, Vilacova

Government
  - Type: Concello
  - Body: Concello de Salvaterra de Miño
  - Mayor: Marta Valcarcel Gómez (PPdeG)

Area
  - Total: 61 km^{2} (24 sq mi)
- Highest elevation (Chan do Couto): 573 m (1,880 ft)

Population (2024)
  - Total: 10,471 ▲
  - Rank: 23rd in Pontevedra
- Demonym(s): Salvaterran salvaterrense
- Time zone: UTC+1 (CET)
  - Summer (DST): UTC+2 (CET)
- Postal code: 36450, 36455, 36456, 36457, 36458, 36459
- INE code: 36050

Salvaterra de Miño (Note: Galician pronunciation: [salβaˈtɛra ðe ˈmiɲo]; Spanish: Salvatierra de Miño) is a town and municipality in Galicia, Spain. It is situated on the northern bank of the Miño River, which serves as the natural border between Spain and Portugal. Directly across the river lies the Portuguese town of Monção, with which it forms the Monção–Salvaterra de Miño Eurocity. It is also part of the Vigo metropolitan area.

== Name ==
The town was simply known as Salvatierra until 1916, when the Spanish government renamed over 500 municipalities to prevent confusion caused by identical place names. As part of this effort, the town became Salvatierra de Miño (lit. Salvatierra of the Miño). In 1983, in accordance with the Law of Linguistic Normalisation, the government officially recognised the Galician spelling, Salvaterra de Miño, as the official name in both Galician and Spanish.

Residents of Salvaterra are known as salvaterrenses.

== History ==
On 24 May 991, Bermudo II donated the landholding of the valley of Salvatierra to the Archidiocese of Santiago de Compostela, a territory which he had inherited from his father Ordoño III. The area contained a number of small settlements, the largest of which was Lacitorium, later known as Lazoiro. In 1228, the settlement was renamed Salva terram (Salvatierra) when it was granted a municipal charter by Alfonso IX. The name change is believed to have been inspired by the monarch's tendency to adopt French-inspired place names, such as Bayonne (Baiona), Vienne (Viana do Bolo), and, in this case Sauveterre-de-Béarn.

Between 1643 and 1659, Salvaterra was occupied by the Portuguese during the Restoration War. Diego García Sarmiento de Sotomayor, Count of Salvatierra, had entrusted his friend, the Portuguese Gregorio Lopes de Puja, with command of the castle while he fought in Extremadura. However, Puja betrayed him by handing it over to João Rodrigo de Vasconcelos e Sousa, Count of Castelo Melhor. On 15 August 1643, Vasconcelos crossed the Miño and took possession of the fortress encountering some resistance from the locals. Under Portuguese control, its defenses were significantly strengthened with the addition of new walls and bastions.

== Geography ==
=== Location ===
Salvaterra is located in the southern part of the province of Pontevedra, at the confluence of the Tea and Miño river valleys, and by the natural limits of the Paradanta mountain range.

It borders the municipalities of Salceda de Caselas to the west, Mondariz and Ponteareas to the north, and As Neves to the east, while the Miño River forms its southern boundary.

== Administration ==
=== Local government ===
Salvaterra de Miño Town Council (2023)
Parties	Councillors
PPdeG	9
PSdeG-PSOE	4
BNG	4

The town council (Concello de Salvaterra de Miño) is responsible for the governance and administration of the municipality. It consists of 17 councillors, who make up the plenary (pleno), and the mayor (alcalde/alcaldesa) who is elected from among them. The council meets at the Casa do Concello in the Praza da Constitución.

The current mayor is Marta Valcarcel Gómez of the People's Party of Galicia, who was re-elected in 2023 with an absolute majority.

=== Administrative subdivisions ===
The municipality of Salvaterra consists of 17 civil parishes, known as parroquias, with Vilacoba and Uma as exclaves. The parishes outside the main town make up the majority of the municipality's 61 km^{2} land area.

Parishes of Salvaterra de Miño
	Place name	Population	Land area in km^{2}	Pop. density per km^{2}
1	Alxén	665	5.6	119
2	Arantei	427	4.3	99
3	Cabreira	437	3.8	115
4	Corzáns	249	1.8	138
5	Fiolledo	262	2.3	114
6	Fornelos (Note: Also known as Fornelos da Ribeira)	731	3.9	187
7	Leirado	613	4.7	130
8	Lira	304	3.8	80
9	Lourido	138	1.6	86
10	Meder	433	4.0	108
11	Oleiros	416	3.9	107
12	Pesqueiras	493	3.9	126
13	Porto	225	2.4	94
14	Salvaterra	4,458	7.0	637
15	Soutolobre	135	2.4	56
16	Uma	152	3.5	43
17	Vilacoba	136	2.1	65

=== Law enforcement ===
Salvaterra is served by the two national law enforcement agencies of Spain: the Civil Guard, a gendarmerie whose barracks are located on the outskirts of town, and the Policía Nacional, which operates an immigration office situated near the old ferry crossing. Additionally, there is a smaller municipal police force, the Policía Local, based at the town hall.

=== International relations ===
In 2015, the municipalities of Monção and Salvaterra, together with the Galicia–North Portugal Euroregion association, signed an agreement to encourage cooperation around promoting the Miño River, winemaking and local cuisine. The office overseeing this initiative is located in the old customs house on the Portuguese side of the river.

== Demographics ==
The municipality of Salvaterra is composed of the town of Salvaterra and the 16 rural parishes around it, with a total population of 10,471 (as of 2024). Just under half the population live in the town, and just over half in the rural parishes.

== Economy ==
Salvaterra is considered a commuter town, with many residents commuting to jobs in Vigo or the more industrial neighbouring municipality of O Porriño. However, there is a small industrial park called Chan da Ponte to the north of the town.

Plisan (Plataforma Logística e Industrial de Salvaterra-As Neves) is an industrial park, logistics centre and dry port currently under development. At 3,091,000 m² it is the largest in the Galicia–North Portugal Euroregion. It was created through a partnership between the regional government and the Vigo Freeport consortium. The first company to move in to the initial phase of the development was the canning factory Conservas Albo in 2023.

== Infrastructure ==
=== Roads ===
Salvaterra is connected to its neighbouring municipalities by several regional roads. From the west, the PO-510 runs from O Porriño through Salceda de Caselas before terminating in Salvaterra. Heading east, the PO-400 links the town to As Neves, Arbo and Crecente, while the PO-403 runs north to Ponteareas. To the south, the PO-414 is a short 1.2 km stretch that passes through the town to connect with the international bridge.

The road maintenance agency responsible for maintaining these regional roads of the Red Autonómica de Carreteras de Galicia in the south of Pontevedra is based in the municipality.

=== Crossings ===
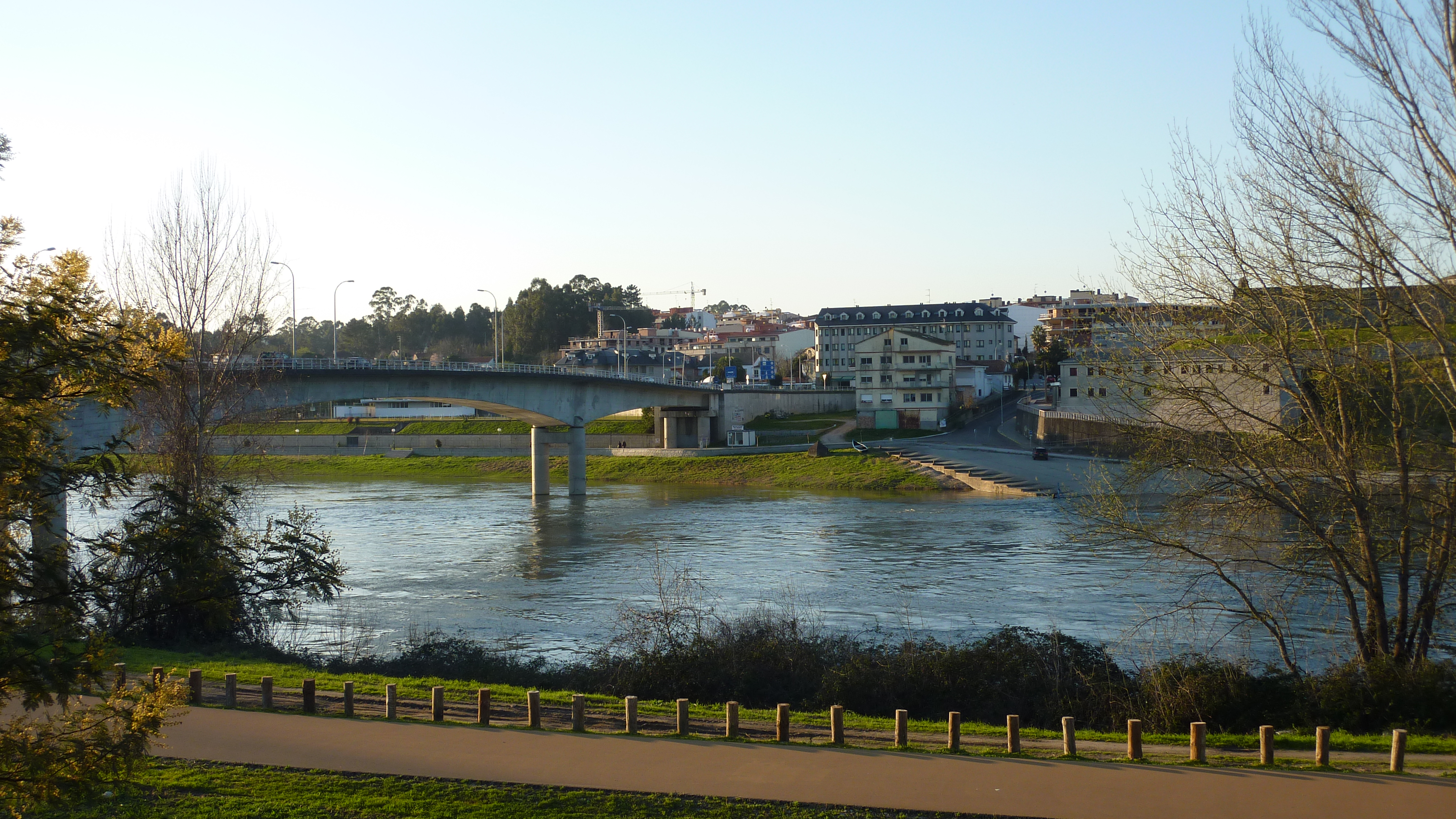
The international bridge (left) and old ferry slipway (right).

Salvaterra is linked to Monção by the João Verde/Amador Saavedra International Bridge which carries approximately 9,000 vehicles every day. Before the opening of the bridge on 29 March 1995, the towns were served by a car-carrying cable ferry which had been in operation for a decade.

=== Public transport ===
Salvaterra and its surrounding parishes are connected to neighbouring towns by the regional Transporte Público de Galicia bus network, with the main route being the As Neves–Vigo bus service. A mixed-use school bus service also operates in the mornings, transporting both students and adults. Buses depart from the town's main bus stop on Rúa Raíña Doña Urraca.

Salvaterra train station is located in the town centre and is managed by Adif, with services operated by Renfe. The station is part of the regional Monforte de Lemos–Redondela railway line.

== Education ==
Salvaterra has one secondary school (IES Salvaterra de Miño), three primary schools (CEIP Infante Felipe de Borbón, CEP Carlos Casares and CEIP Leirado) and one preschool.

== Healthcare ==
Salvaterra de Miño Health Centre provides primary care for local residents as part of the Galician Healthcare Service, with Salvaterra belonging to the Vigo healthcare district. From there, patients needing specialist treatment are referred to either Meixoeiro Hospital or Álvaro Cunqueiro Hospital, both in Vigo, with the latter also handling emergencies.

== Recreation ==
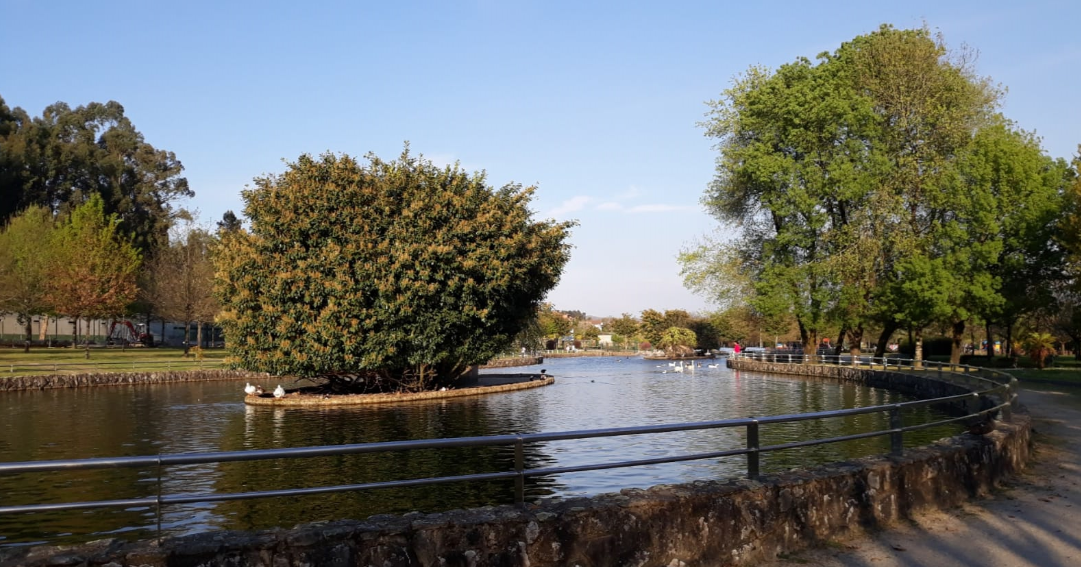
The duck pond in A Canuda Park

=== Green spaces ===
A Canuda Park, the largest park in Galicia, covers 49 acres (20 ha) along the riverbank in the southern part of town. Besides a large children's playground, it includes a range of facilities such as a calisthenics circuit, an amphitheatre, a road safety circuit and a small botanical garden. Salvaterra also has a number of riverside hiking trails that follow the tributaries feeding into the Miño.

=== Community centres ===
Each parish has its own municipally owned community centre, known as a centro cultural, run by a local association. These centres host activities for residents and serve as polling stations during elections.

== See also ==
- Salvatierra – municipality of the same name in the Basque Country, Spain
- Salceda de Caselas – neighbouring municipality that underwent a similar name change
