= Miñor =

River in Spain

River Miñor
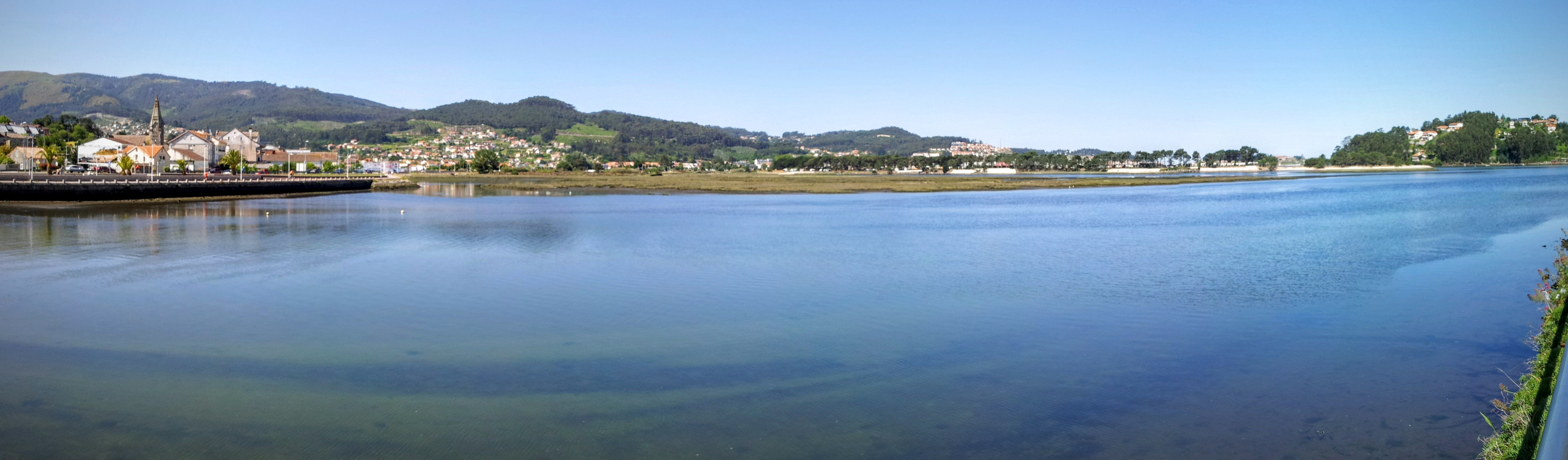
- Estuary of Miñor River in Ramallosa

Location
- Country: Spain
- Region: Galicia
- City: Baiona, Pontevedra

Physical characteristics
- Source
  - location: Spain
- Mouth: Bay of Baiona in the Atlantic Ocean
  - location: Between Nigrán and Baiona
  - coordinates: 42°07′12″N 8°49′21″W

The Miñor is a river of Galicia, Spain. It is 9.9 miles (16 km) long, and stretches from O Galiñeiro to the places of Ramallosa and Sabarís between Nigrán and Baiona in the Province of Pontevedra.

== See also ==
- Rivers of Galicia
