= Caselas FC =

Caselas
- Full name: Caselas Fútbol Club
- Founded: 28 June 1967; 58 years ago
- Ground: A Gándara, Salceda de Caselas; Galicia, Spain
- Capacity: 433
- President: José Carlos Pena Iglesias
- Manager: Nacho Soret
- League: Primera Futgal – Group 6
- 2024–25: Segunda Futgal – Vigo, 3rd of 16 (promoted)
- Website: caselasfc.es
Home colours	Away colours

Caselas Fútbol Club is a Spanish football club based in Salceda de Caselas, in the autonomous community of Galicia. Founded in 1967, they currently play in Primera Futgal – Group 6, holding home matches at the A Gándara.

== History ==
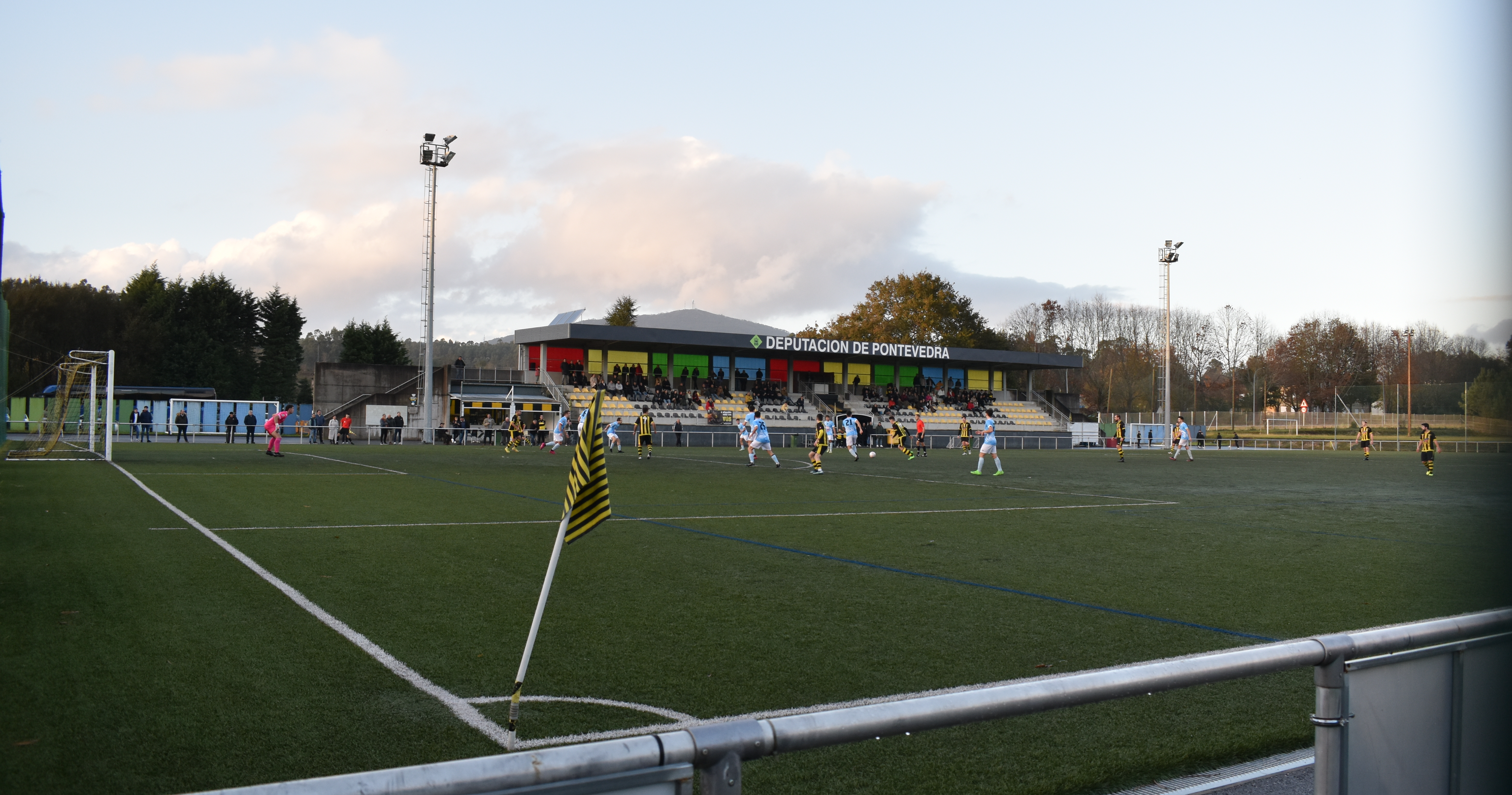
Caselas playing against Atlético Cuntis in 2022

Founded on 28 June 1967, Caselas served as a replacement to Salceda, a local club in the city. In 1992, the club achieved a first-ever promotion to Tercera División, and remained in the category until 1999.

== Season to season ==
Season	Tier	Division	Place	Copa del Rey
1967–68	5	2ª Reg.	5th	
1968–69	5	2ª Reg.	4th	
1969–70	5	2ª Reg.	10th	
1970–71	5	2ª Reg.	3rd	
1971–72	5	2ª Reg.	2nd	
1972–73	5	2ª Reg.	4th	
1973–74	5	2ª Reg.	6th	
1974–75	5	2ª Reg.	2nd	
1975–76	5	2ª Reg.	2nd	
1976–77	5	2ª Reg.	1st	
1977–78	5	Serie A	10th	
1978–79	5	Reg. Pref.	8th	
1979–80	5	Reg. Pref.	11th	
1980–81	5	Reg. Pref.	6th	
1981–82	5	Reg. Pref.	9th	
1982–83	5	Reg. Pref.	15th	
1983–84	5	Reg. Pref.	17th	
1984–85	5	Reg. Pref.	6th	
1985–86	5	Reg. Pref.	7th	
1986–87	5	Reg. Pref.	16th	

Season	Tier	Division	Place	Copa del Rey
1987–88	5	Reg. Pref.	10th	
1988–89	5	Reg. Pref.	15th	
1989–90	5	Reg. Pref.	7th	
1990–91	5	Reg. Pref.	6th	
1991–92	5	Reg. Pref.	1st	
1992–93	4	3ª	14th	
1993–94	4	3ª	10th	
1994–95	4	3ª	10th	
1995–96	4	3ª	5th	
1996–97	4	3ª	9th	
1997–98	4	3ª	7th	
1998–99	4	3ª	10th	
1999–2000	5	Reg. Pref.	1st	
2000–01	4	3ª	20th	
2001–02	5	Reg. Pref.	16th	
2002–03	5	Reg. Pref.	17th	
2003–04	5	Reg. Pref.	3rd	
2004–05	5	Reg. Pref.	2nd	
2005–06	4	3ª	20th	
2006–07	5	Pref. Aut.	5th	

Season	Tier	Division	Place	Copa del Rey
2007–08	5	Pref. Aut.	12th	
2008–09	5	Pref. Aut.	10th	
2009–10	5	Pref. Aut.	17th	
2010–11	6	1ª Aut.	9th	
2011–12	6	1ª Aut.	7th	
2012–13	6	1ª Aut.	2nd	
2013–14	5	Pref. Aut.	18th	
2014–15	6	1ª Aut.	3rd	
2015–16	5	Pref.	15th	
2016–17	5	Pref.	17th	
2017–18	5	Pref.	15th	
2018–19	6	1ª Gal.	12th	
2019–20	6	1ª Gal.	2nd	
2020–21	5	Pref.	3rd	
2021–22	6	Pref.	10th	
2022–23	7	1ª Gal.	18th	
2023–24	8	2ª Gal.	10th	
2024–25	8	2ª Futgal	3rd	
2025–26	7	1ª Futgal		

- 9 seasons in Tercera División
- 1 season in Tercera División RFEF
