= Nigrán =

- Municipality
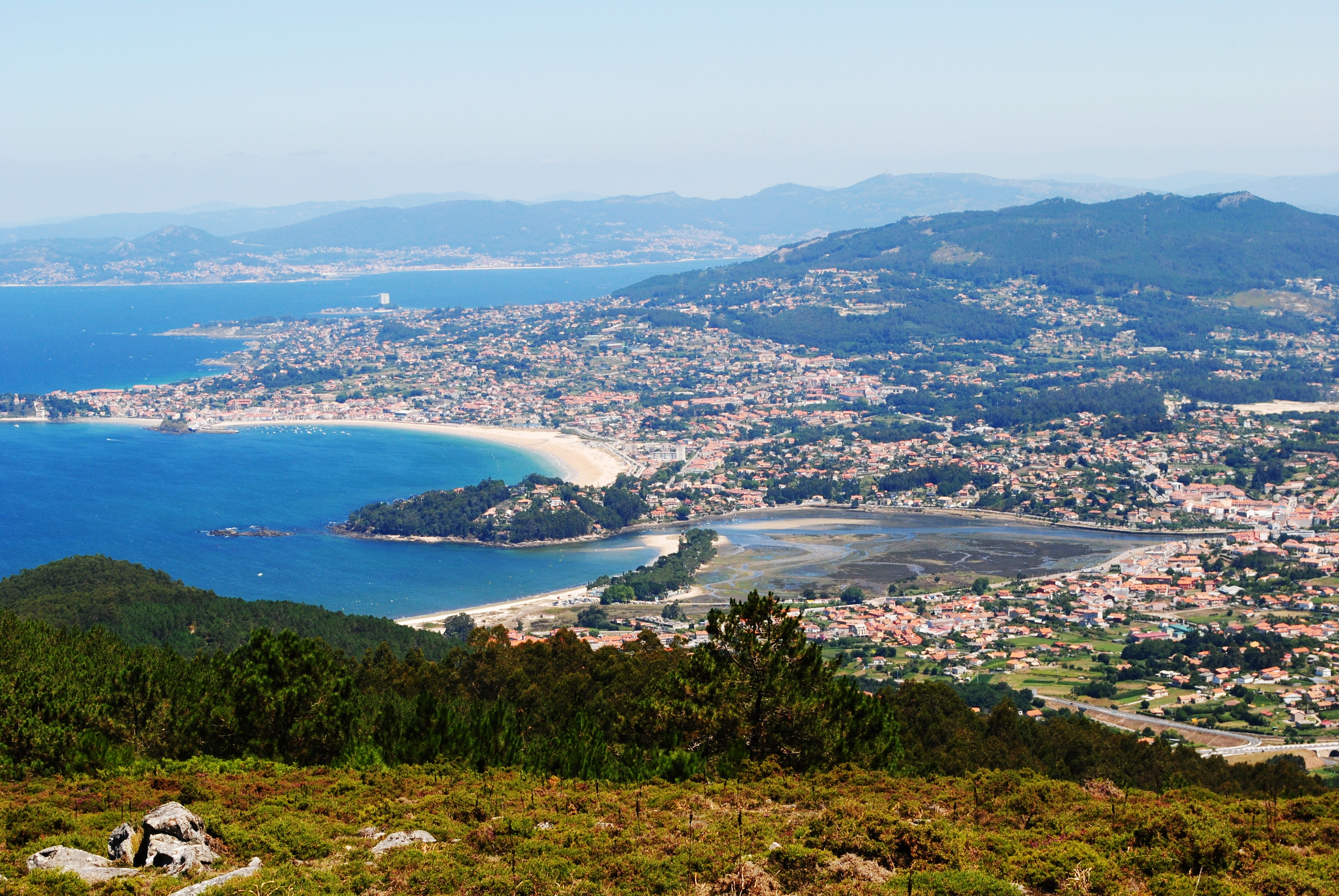
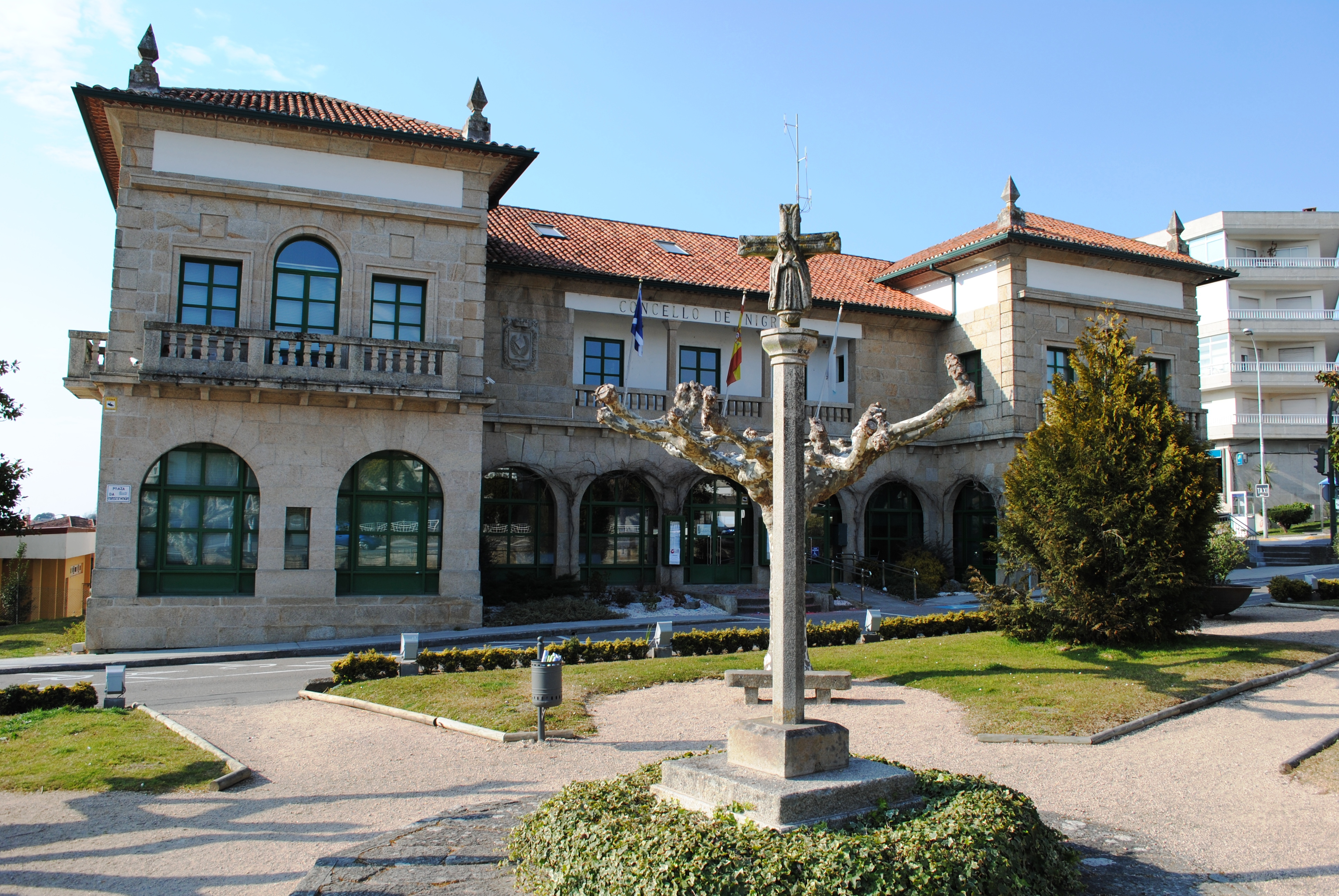
- Clockwise: General view; América Beach; Town Hall

- Flag Coat of arms

- Location in Spain Nigrán (Galicia) Nigrán (Spain)
- Coordinates: 42°8′31″N 8°48′20″W
- Country: Spain
- Autonomous community: Galicia
- Province: Pontevedra
- Comarca: Vigo

Government
  - Alcalde: Juan González Pérez (PSdeG–PSOE)

Area
  - Total: 34.9 km^{2} (13.5 sq mi)

Population (2025-01-01)
  - Total: 18,174
  - Density: 521/km^{2} (1,350/sq mi)
- Time zone: UTC+1 (CET)
  - Summer (DST): UTC+2 (CET)
- Website: www.nigran.es

Nigrán (Spanish pronunciation: [niˈɣɾan], Galician: [niˈɣɾaŋ]) is a municipality in the province of Pontevedra, in the autonomous community of Galicia, northwestern Spain. It belongs to the comarca of Vigo and the Vigo metropolitan area.

It has an area of 35 square kilometres (14 sq mi) and a population of approximately 18,000 people divided into seven parishes: Nigrán, Panxón, San Pedro da Ramallosa, Parada, Camos, Chandebrito and Priegue. Located on Spain’s Atlantic coast, Nigrán is a popular summer tourist destination due to its beaches and mild summer weather, with its population nearly tripling during the summer months.

== Landmarks ==
In the parish of Panxón lie the remains of a Visigothic church dating from the 6th or 7th century, of which only the entrance arch remains; nearby stands the Votive Temple of the Sea, an eclectic catholic church designed by Galician architect Antonio Palacios and completed in 1937.

Also worthy of note is the Ramallosa Bridge, a transitional example of Romanesque to Gothic architecture. It spans the River Miñor, between Nigran and Baiona.

== Notable people ==
- Brays Efe - Galician actor and television personality
- Iván Ferreiro - Galician singer-songwriter
- Dro - footballer for Paris Saint-Germain

== See also ==
- List of municipalities in Pontevedra
