= A Paradanta =

Coordinates: 42.2128°N 8.27444°W

- Comarca
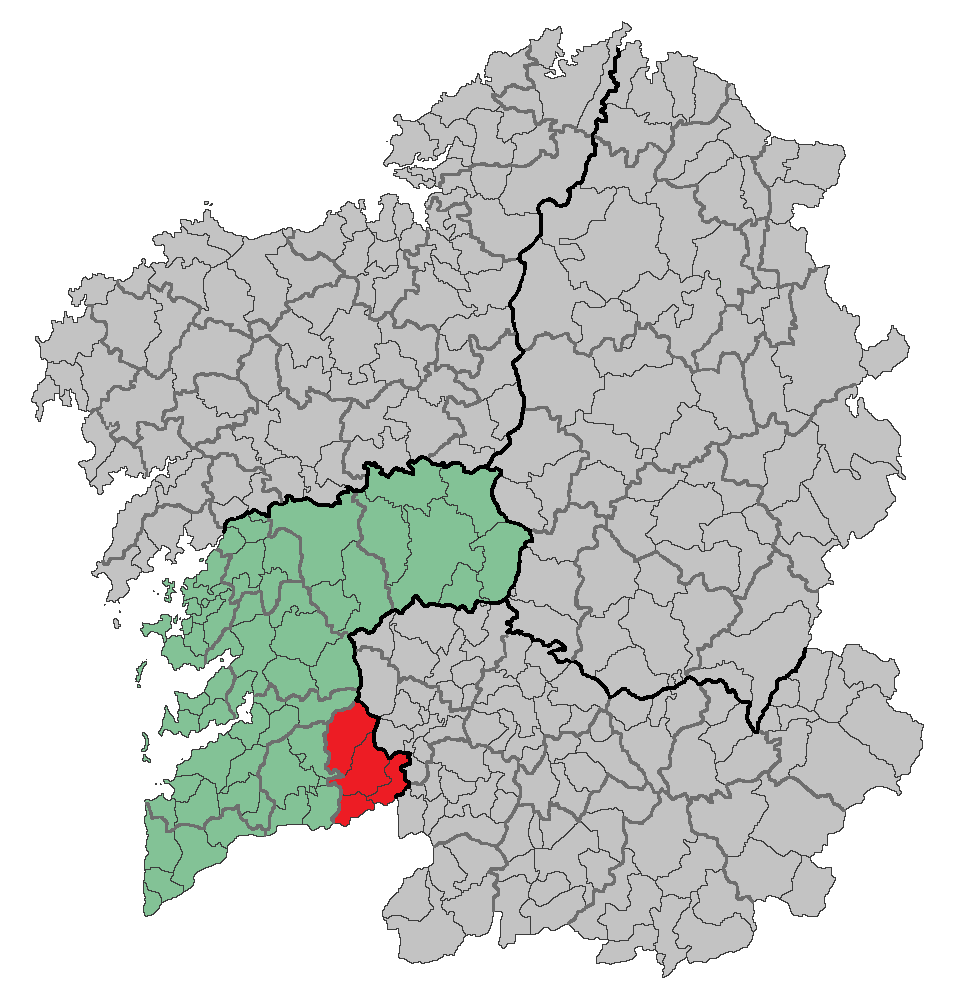
- Country: Spain
- Autonomous community: Galicia
- Province: Pontevedra
- Capital: A Cañiza
- Municipalities: List: Arbo, A Cañiza, Covelo, Crecente

Population (2018)
  - Total: 12,259
- Time zone: UTC+1 (CET)
  - Summer (DST): UTC+2 (CEST)

A Paradanta is a comarca in the southeastern corner of the Galician Province of Pontevedra. The overall population of this comarca was 13,826 at the 2011 Census; the latest official estimate (as at the start of 2018) was 12,259.

== Municipalities ==
The comarca comprises the following four municipalities:

Name of municipality	Population (2001)	Population (2011)	Population (2018)
Arbo	3,742	3,130	2,637
A Cañiza	7,194	5,471	5,173
Covelo	3,743	2,880	2,417
Crecente	2,677	2,345	2,032
Totals	17,356	13,826	12,259
