= Cuntis =

Municipality of Galicia, Spain

Concello de Cuntis
- municipality
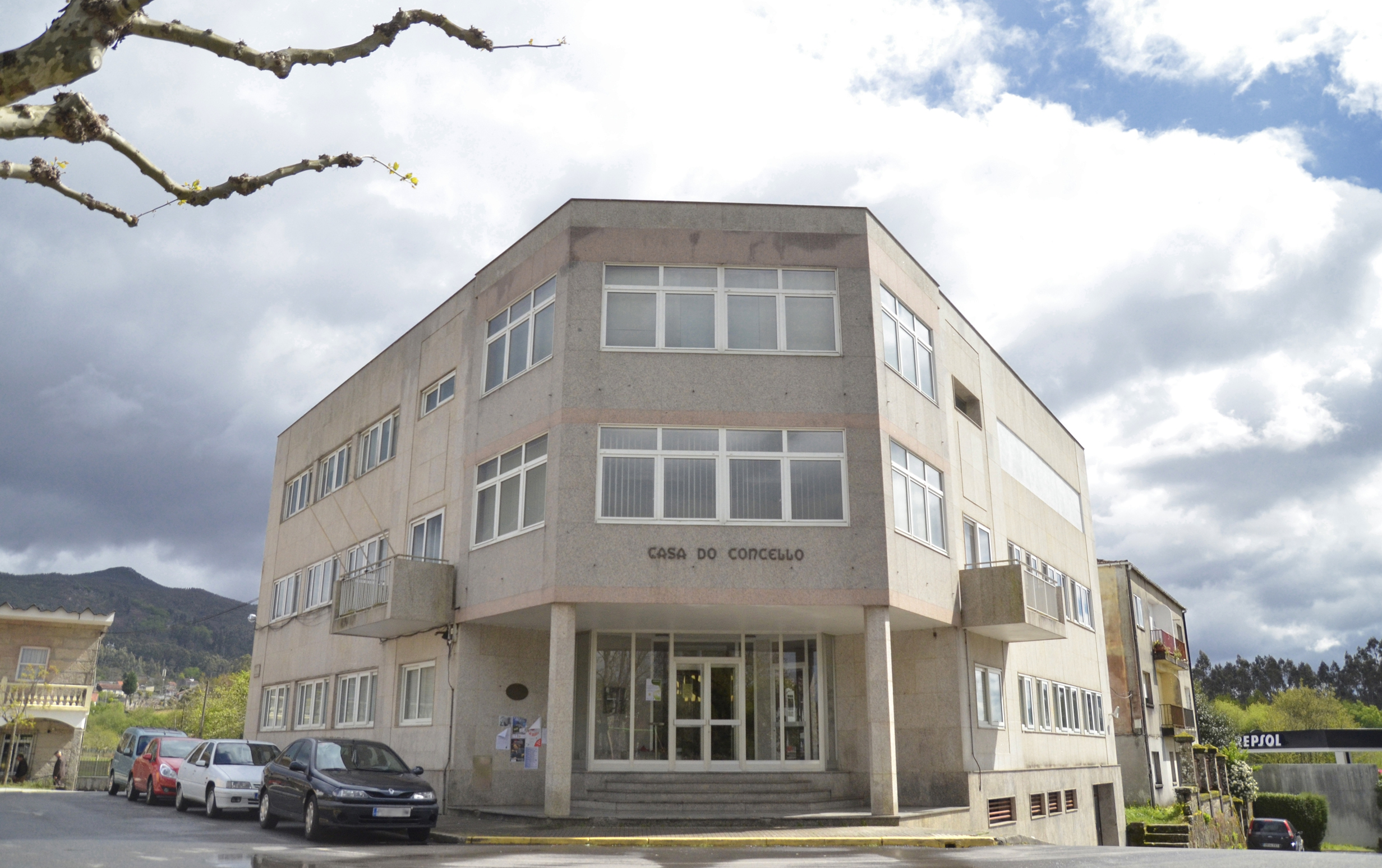

- Flag Seal

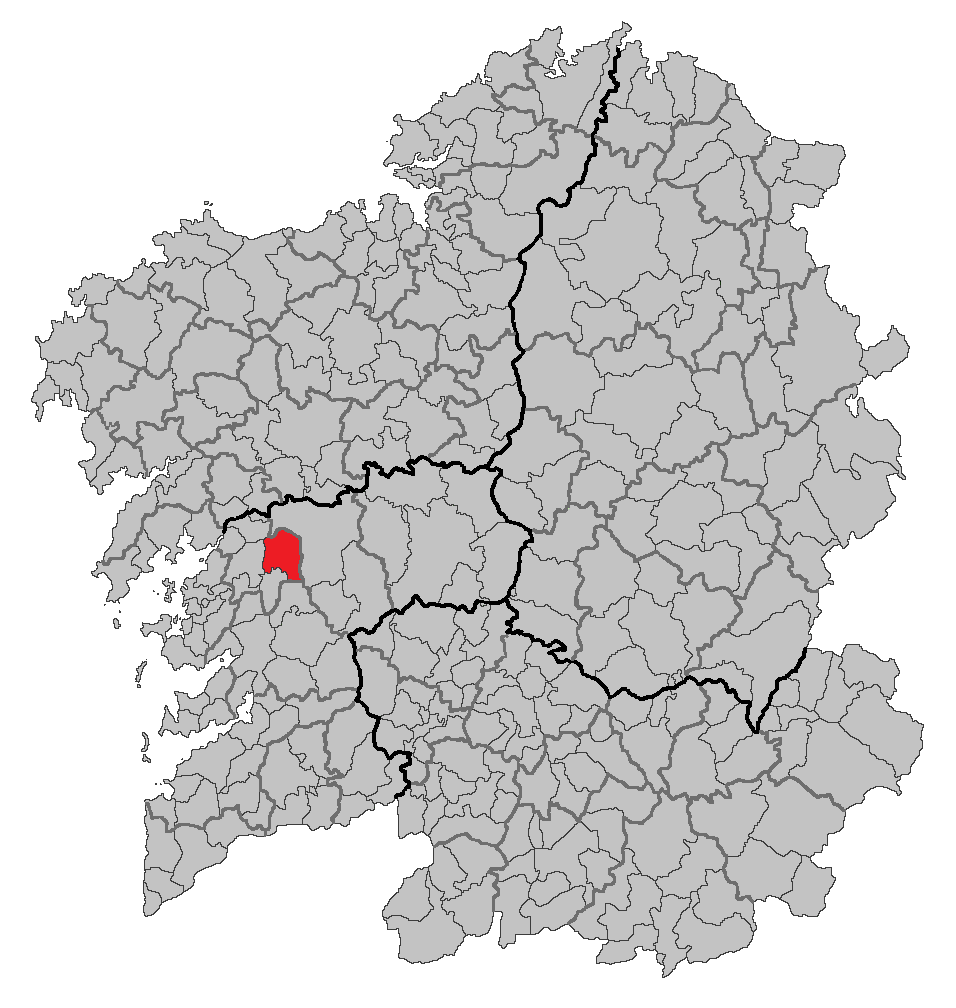
- Location of Cuntis within Galicia
- Coordinates: 42°38′N 8°33′W
- Country: Spain
- Autonomous community: Galicia
- Province: Pontevedra

Population (2025-01-01)
  - Total: 4,469
- Time zone: UTC+1 (CET)
  - Summer (DST): UTC+2 (CET)

Cuntis is a municipality of Galicia, Spain, in the province of Pontevedra.

== See also ==
- List of municipalities in Pontevedra
