= O Porriño derailment =

2016 railway accident in Galicia, Spain

Coordinates: 42°9′59″N 8°37′20″W

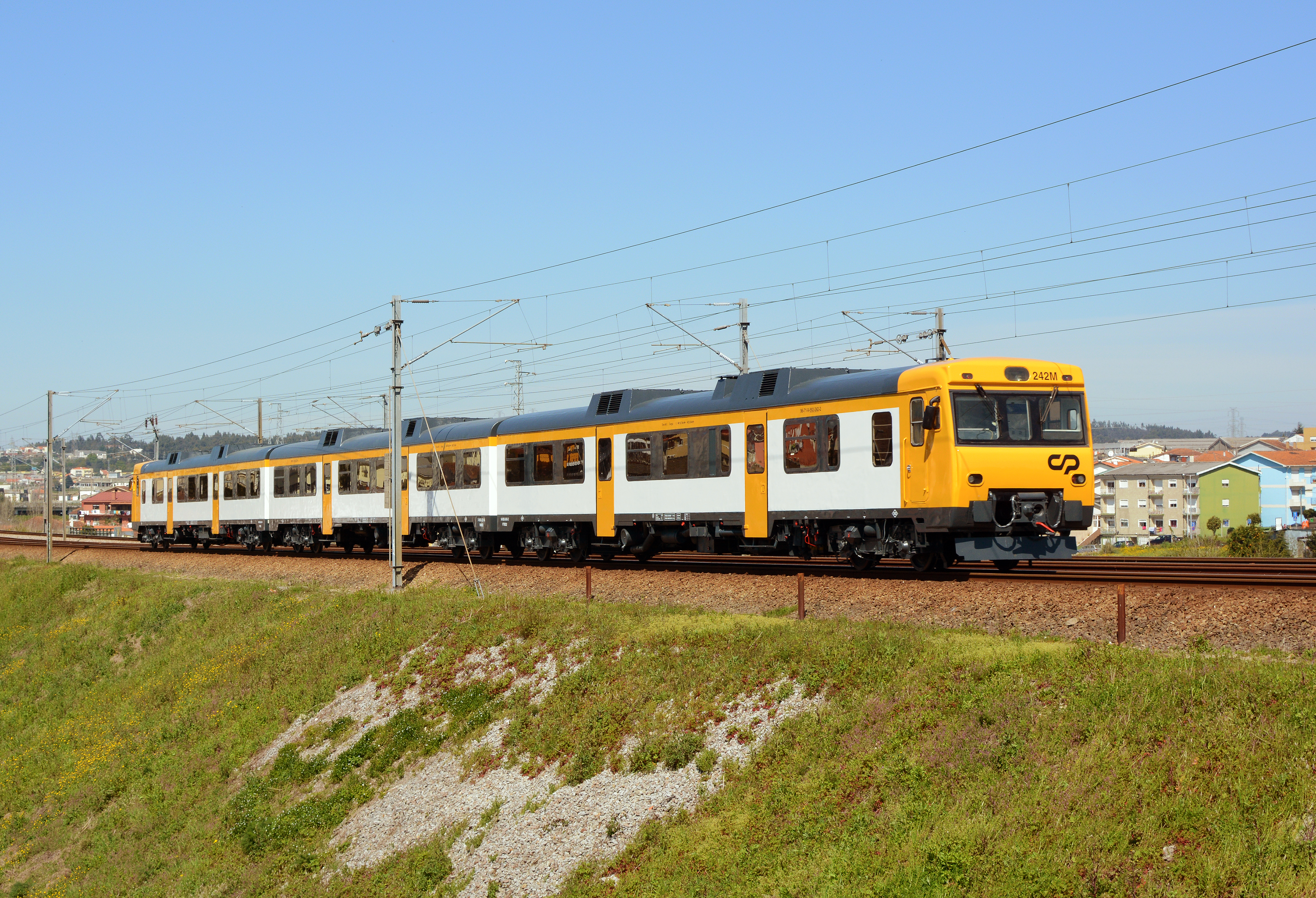
- A Class 592 DMU

Details
- Date: 9 September 2016; 09:25
- Location: O Porriño
- Country: Spain
- Operator: CP Longo Curso
- Incident type: Derailment
- Cause: Speeding

Statistics
- Trains: 1
- Passengers: 69
- Crew: 2
- Deaths: 4
- Injured: 49 (seven serious)

On 9 September 2016, a passenger train travelling from Vigo, Spain to Porto, Portugal derailed at O Porriño, Galicia, Spain. Four people were killed and 49 were injured, seven severely.

== Derailment ==
The RENFE Class 592 DMU was travelling from Vigo, Spain, to Porto, Portugal, when it derailed at O Porriño, Galicia, Spain. The accident happened at 09:30 local time (07:30 UTC). The derailed train hit an overbridge and signalling tower. The driver, a ticket inspector, and two of the 69 passengers were killed and 49 were injured.

== Investigation ==
The Administrador de Infraestructuras Ferroviarias opened an investigation into the accident. The Comisión de Investigación de Accidentes Ferroviarios is also investigating the accident.

The data recorder was recovered from the wreckage. Information recovered from the data recorder showed that the train was travelling at 118 kilometres per hour (73 mph) when it derailed. The speed limit was 30 kilometres per hour (19 mph).
