= Fornelos de Montes =

Concello de Fornelos de Montes
- municipality
- Flag Seal

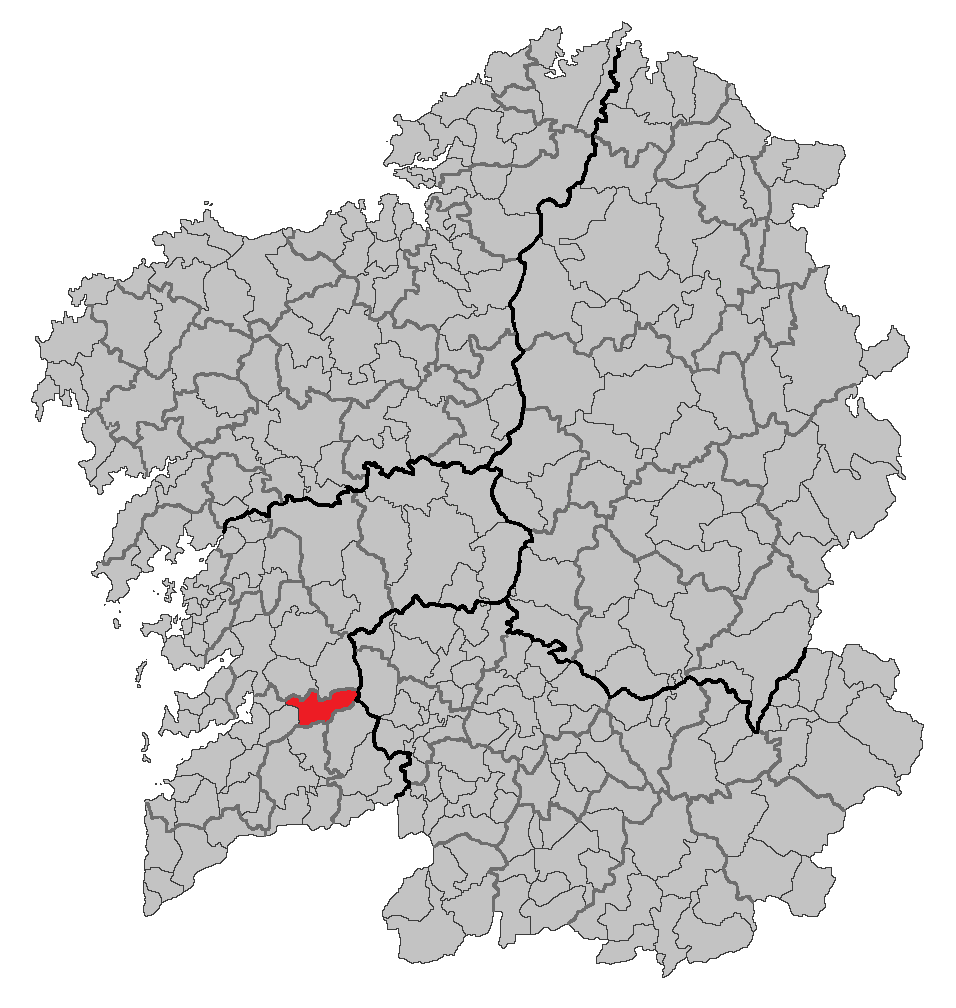
- Location of the Municipality Fornelos de Montes within Galicia

- Location within Province of Pontevedra Location within Galicia Location within Spain
- Coordinates: 42°20′N 8°27′W
- Country: Spain
- Autonomous Community: Galicia
- Province: Pontevedra
- Comarca: Comarca de Vigo

Government
  - Alcalde (Mayor): Serafín A. Martínez Martínez

Population (2025-01-01)
  - Total: 1,614
- Time zone: UTC+1 (CET)
  - Summer (DST): UTC+2 (CET)
- Website: www.fornelos.com

Fornelos de Montes is a municipality in Galicia, in the province of Pontevedra, Spain. It is composed of seven parishes: Calvos, Stakes, Fornelos de Montes (San Lorenzo), Lage, Oitaven (San Vicente), Traspielas (Santa Maria), and Ventin (San Miguel). It is known for having some of the most abundant rainfall in Galicia, an estimated 2862 mm per year. Fornelos de Montes is intersected by the Oitavén River, the Barragán River, and the Parada River in the Serra do Suído mountain range.

== See also ==
- List of municipalities in Pontevedra
