= Gondomar, Pontevedra =

Gondomar
- Municipality
- Seal

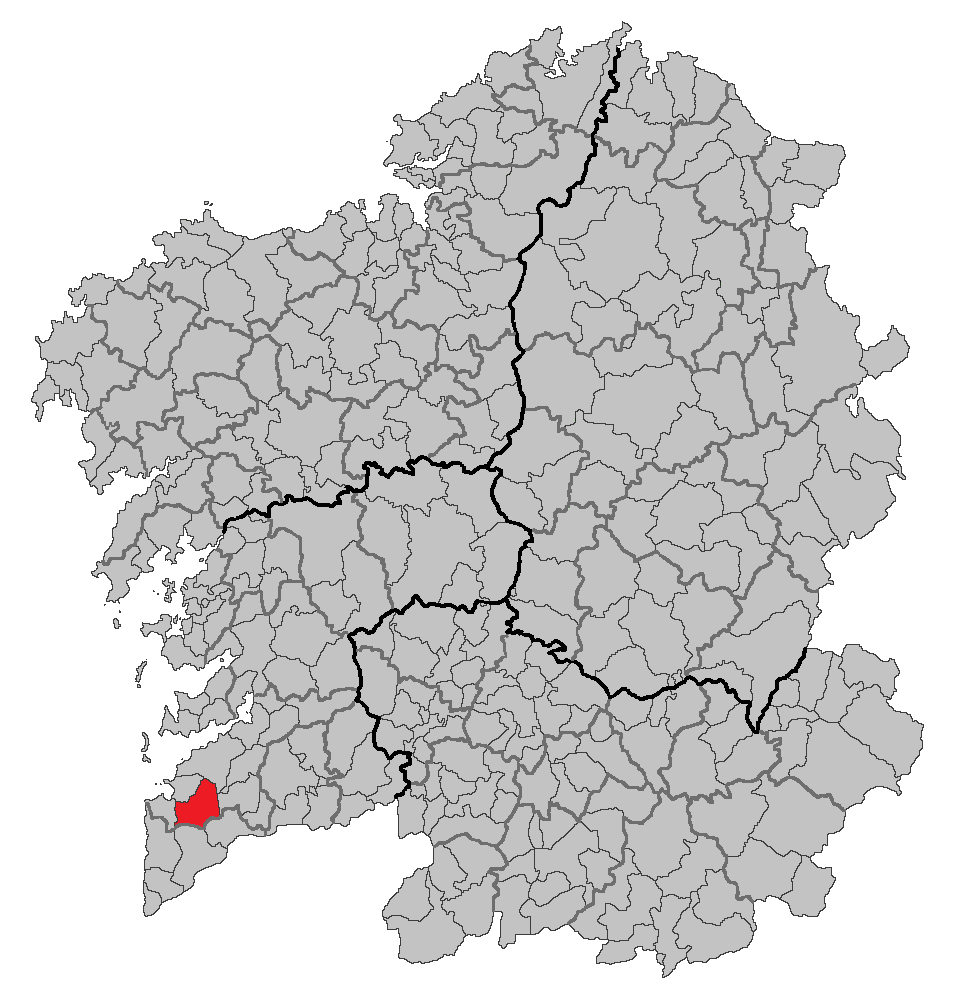
- Location of Gondomar within Galicia
- Coordinates: 42°6′40″N 8°45′40″W
- Country: Spain
- Region: Galicia
- Province: Pontevedra
- County: Vigo
- Parishes: Borreiros (San Martiño), Chaín (Santa María), Couso, Donas (Santa Baia), Gondomar (San Bieito), Mañufe (San Vicente), Morgadáns (Santiago), Peitieiros (San Miguel), Vilaza (Santa María), Vincios (Santa Mariña)

Government
  - Mayor: Martín Urgal Alonso (People's Party of Galicia)

Area
  - Total: 74.5 km^{2} (28.8 sq mi)

Population (2025-01-01)
  - Total: 15,066
  - Density: 202/km^{2} (524/sq mi)
- Time zone: UTC+1 (CET)
  - Summer (DST): UTC+2 (CET)
- Postcode: 36380
- Website: https://concellodegondomar.gal/

Gondomar is a municipality in the province of Pontevedra, in the autonomous community of Galicia, Spain. It belongs to the comarca of Vigo. It was the hometown of Don Diego Sarmiento de Acuña, conde de Gondomar, one of the most renowned diplomats of Spanish imperial times, the main instigator of the "Spanish Match" that would have joined Charles I of England and the Infanta Maria Anna in marriage.

== Gallery ==
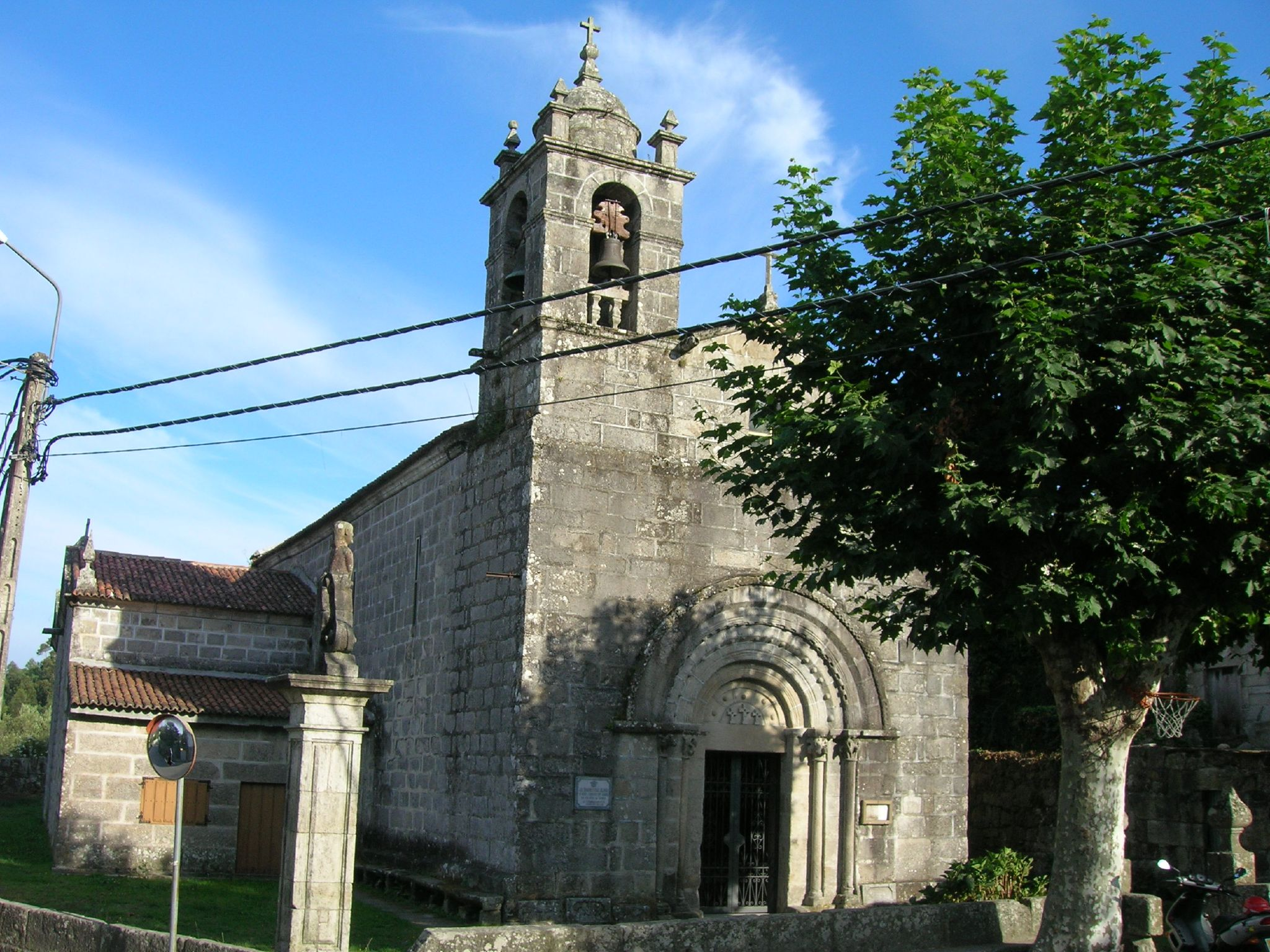
Santa Baia, Donas, Gondomar.

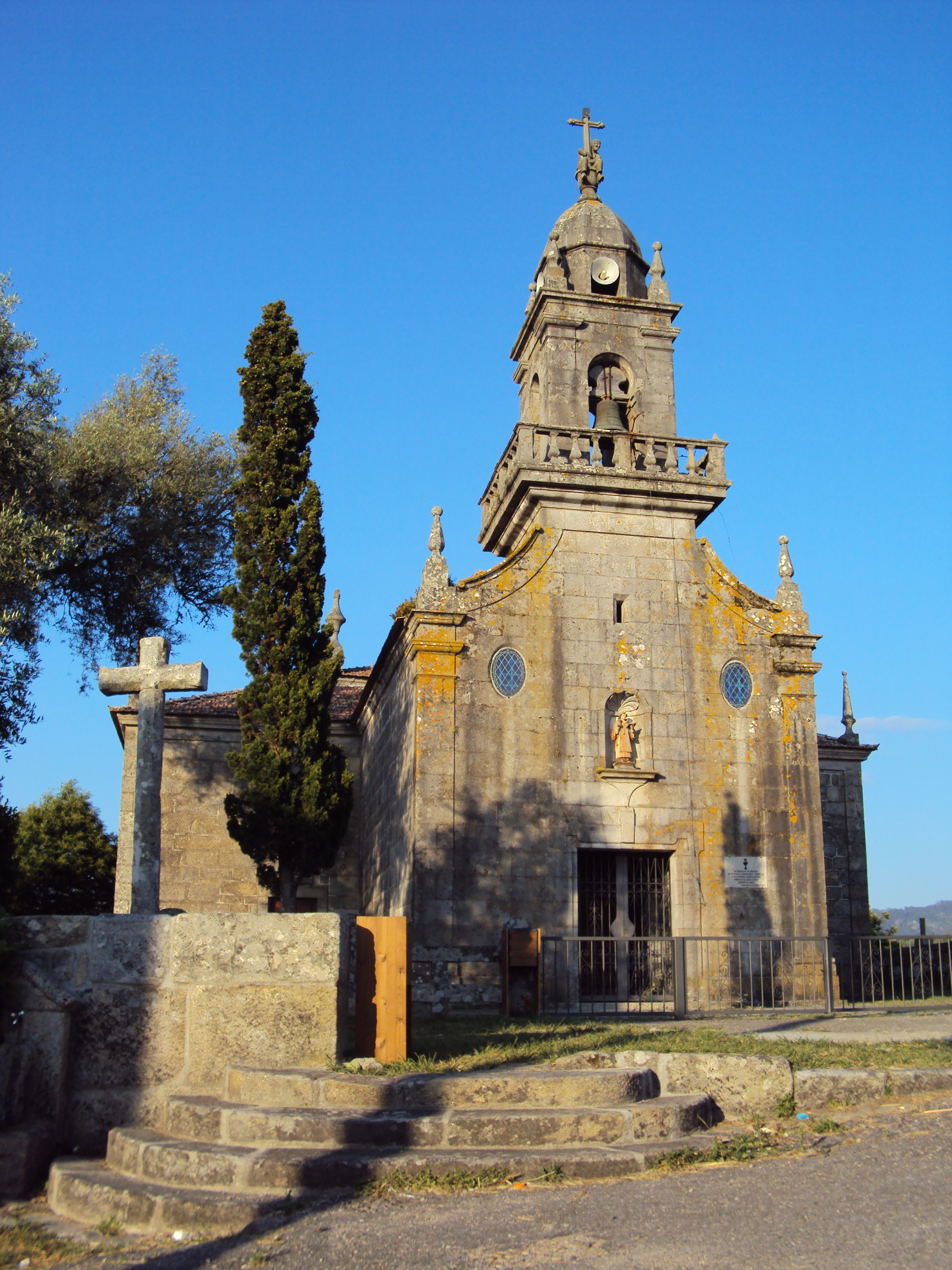
San Vicente, Mañufe, Gondomar.

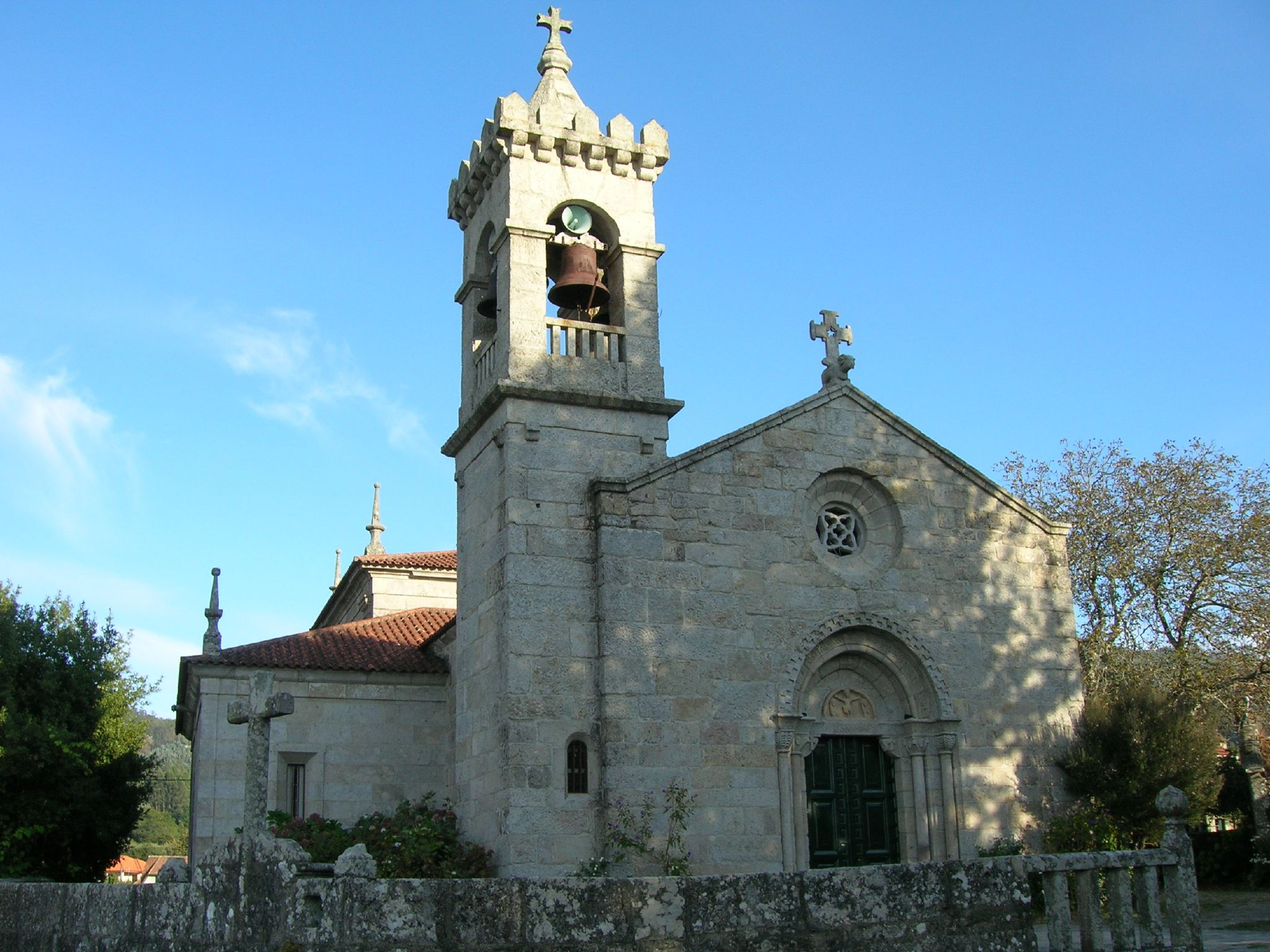
Saint Michael's church, Peitieiros, Gondomar.

== See also ==
- List of municipalities in Pontevedra
