= Crecente =

Municipality in Pontevedra Province, Spain

- Municipality
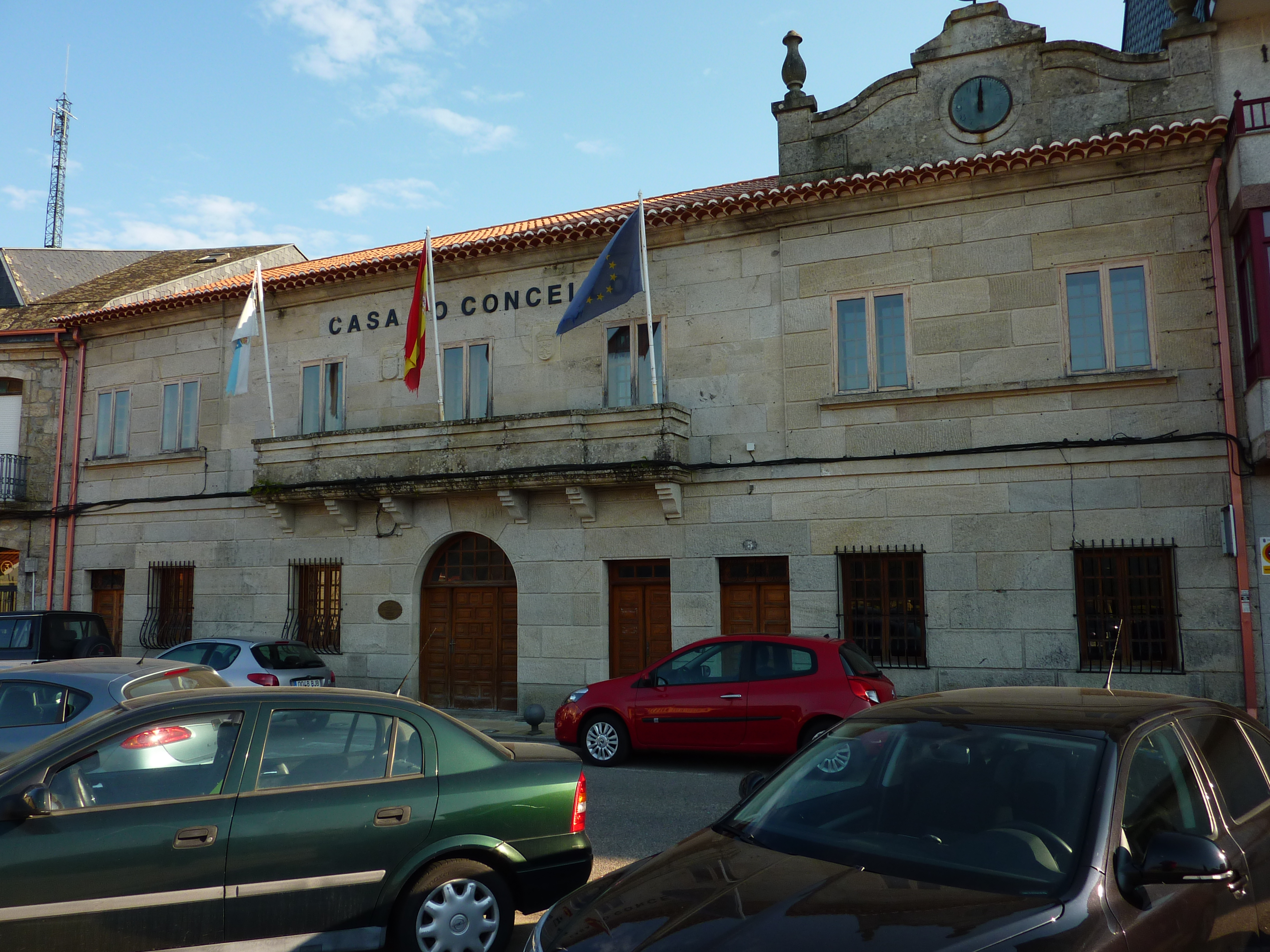

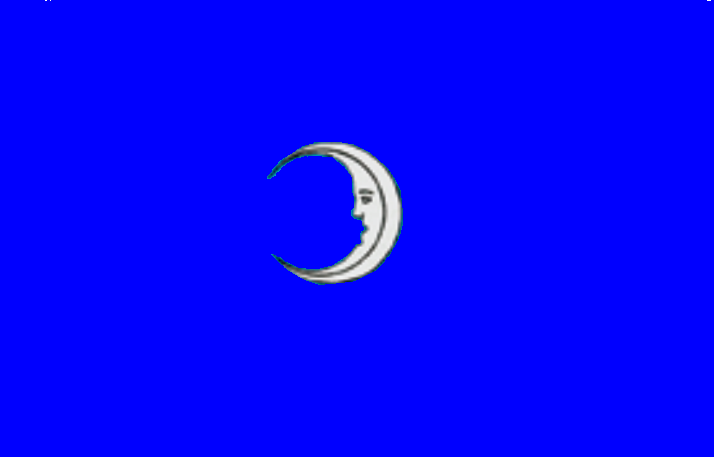
- Flag Coat of arms

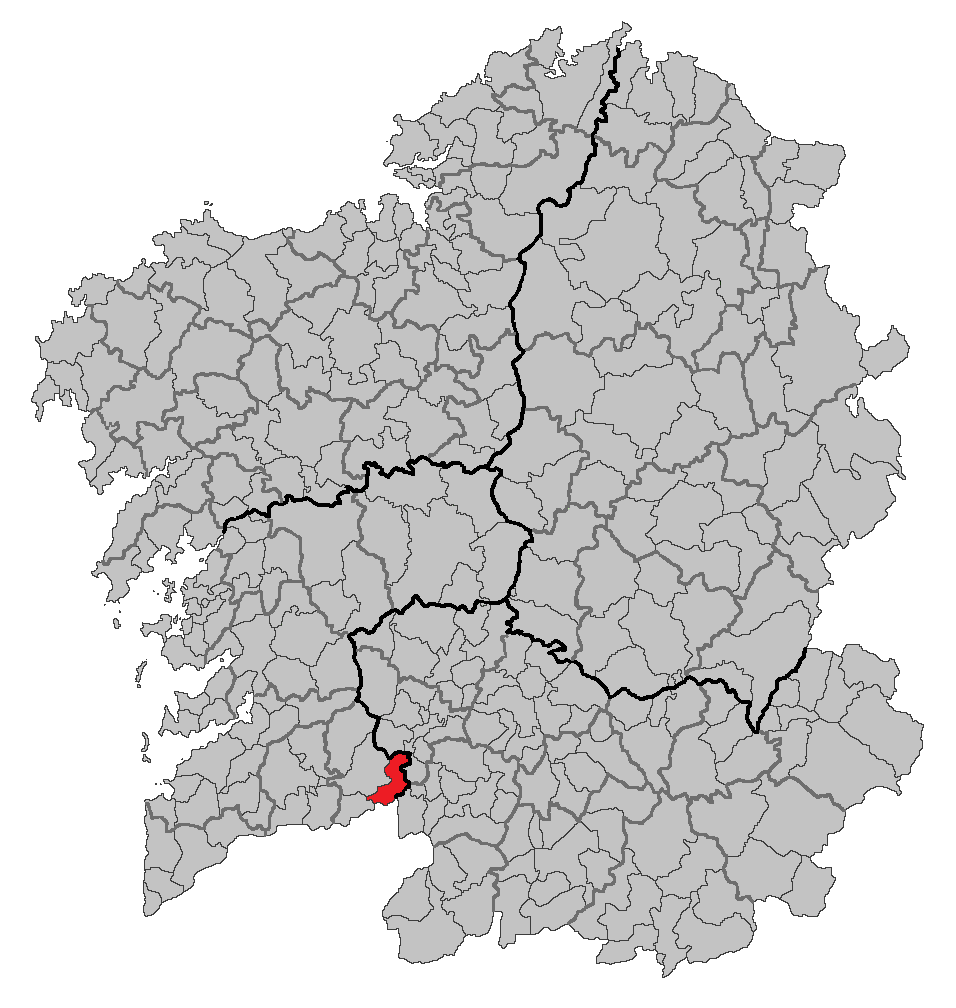
- Location of Crecente within Galicia
- Coordinates: 42°9′9″N 8°13′21″W
- Country: Spain
- Autonomous community: Galicia
- Province: Pontevedra
- Comarca: A Paradanta

Population (2025-01-01)
  - Total: 1,921
- Time zone: UTC+1 (CET)
  - Summer (DST): UTC+2 (CET)
- Website: http://www.crecente.gal/

Crecente is a municipality in the province of Pontevedra, in the autonomous community of Galicia, Spain. It belongs to the comarca of A Paradanta.

== See also ==
- List of municipalities in Pontevedra
