= Vigo (comarca) =

Coordinates: 42.2°N 8.68333°W

- Comarca
- Location of the comarca of Vigo within Galicia.
- Country: Spain
- Region: Galicia
- Province: Pontevedra
- Capital: Vigo
- Municipalities: Baiona, Fornelos de Montes, Gondomar, Mos, Nigrán, Pazos de Borbén, O Porriño, Redondela, Salceda de Caselas, Soutomaior, Vigo

Area
  - Total: 613.4 km^{2} (236.8 sq mi)

Population (2019)
  - Total: 424,765
  - Density: 692.5/km^{2} (1,794/sq mi)
- Demonym(s): vigués (m), viguesa (f)

Vigo is a comarca in the Galician province of Pontevedra, Spain. It covers an area of 613.4 km^{2}, centred on the city of Vigo, and the overall population of this comarca was 423,825 at the 2011 Census; the latest official estimate (for the start of 2019) was 424,765.

The comarca is formed from the following 11 municipalities:

Name of municipality	Population (2001)	Population (2011)	Population (2019)
Baiona	10,931	11,940	12,122
Fornelos de Montes	2,066	1,900	1,616
Gondomar	12,176	14,086	14,286
Mos	14,127	15,194	15,078
Nigrán	16,110	17,870	17,675
Pazos de Borbén	3,052	3,148	2,999
O Porriño	15,960	18,033	19,848
Redondela	29,003	29,947	29,218
Salceda de Caselas	6,335	8,810	9,164
Soutomaior	5,405	7,274	7,395
Vigo	280,186	295,623	295,364
Totals	395,351	423,825	424,765
