= Salceda de Caselas =

Municipality in Galicia, Spain

- Municipality
- Coat of arms

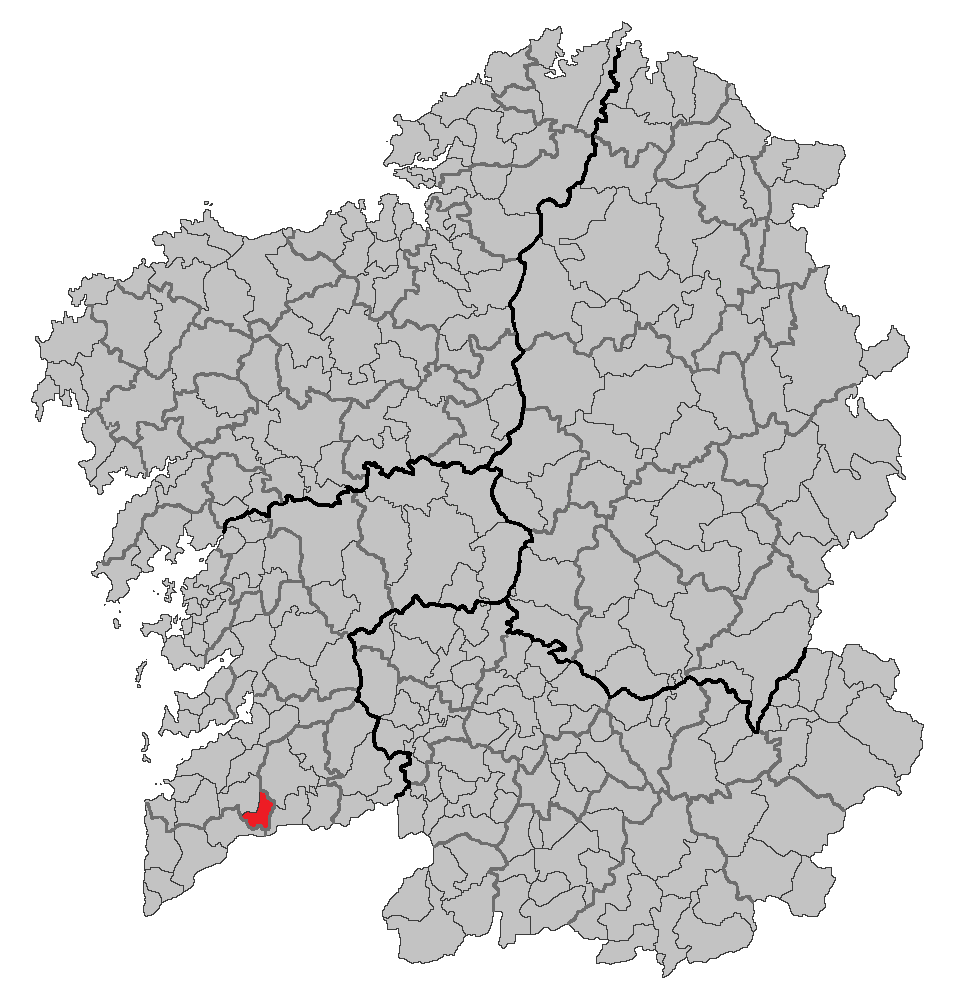
- Location of the municipality of Salceda de Caselas within Galicia.

- Location of Salceda de Caselas within Spain.
- Coordinates: 42.1017°N 8.5589°W
- Country: Spain
- Region: Galicia
- Province: Pontevedra
- Comarca: Vigo
- Parroquias: Entenza, Parderrubias, A Picoña, San Xurxo de Salceda, Santa María de Salceda, Santo Estevo de Budiño, San Vicente de Soutelo

Government
  - Type: Mayor–council
  - Mayor: Marcos David Besada Pérez

Population (2025-01-01)
  - Total: 9,409
- Time zone: UTC+1 (CET)
  - Summer (DST): UTC+2 (CET)
- Website: www.salcedadecaselas.es

Salceda de Caselas is a municipality in the province of Pontevedra, in the autonomous community of Galicia, Spain. It belongs to the comarca of Vigo. It is bordered to the north by the municipality of Ponteareas, to the southeast by the municipality of Salvaterra de Miño, to the southwest by the municipality of Tui, and to the northwest by O Porriño.

== Population ==
- Inhabitants: 8,835 (2012)
- Foreign population: 315 (2005)
- Median age: 38.7 (2005)

== Parishes ==
The municipality is divided into seven parishes:

- Entenza
- Parderrubias
- A Picoña
- San Xurxo de Salceda
- Santa María de Salceda
- Santo Estevo de Budiño
- San Vicente de Soutelo

== Notable people ==
- Francisco Estévez (born in 1898 in Parderrubias) - Galician father of American actor Martin Sheen (Ramón Estévez)
- Denis Suárez (born in 1994) - Spanish professional footballer

== See also ==
- List of municipalities in Pontevedra
