= Pazos de Borbén =

- Municipality
- Flag Coat of arms

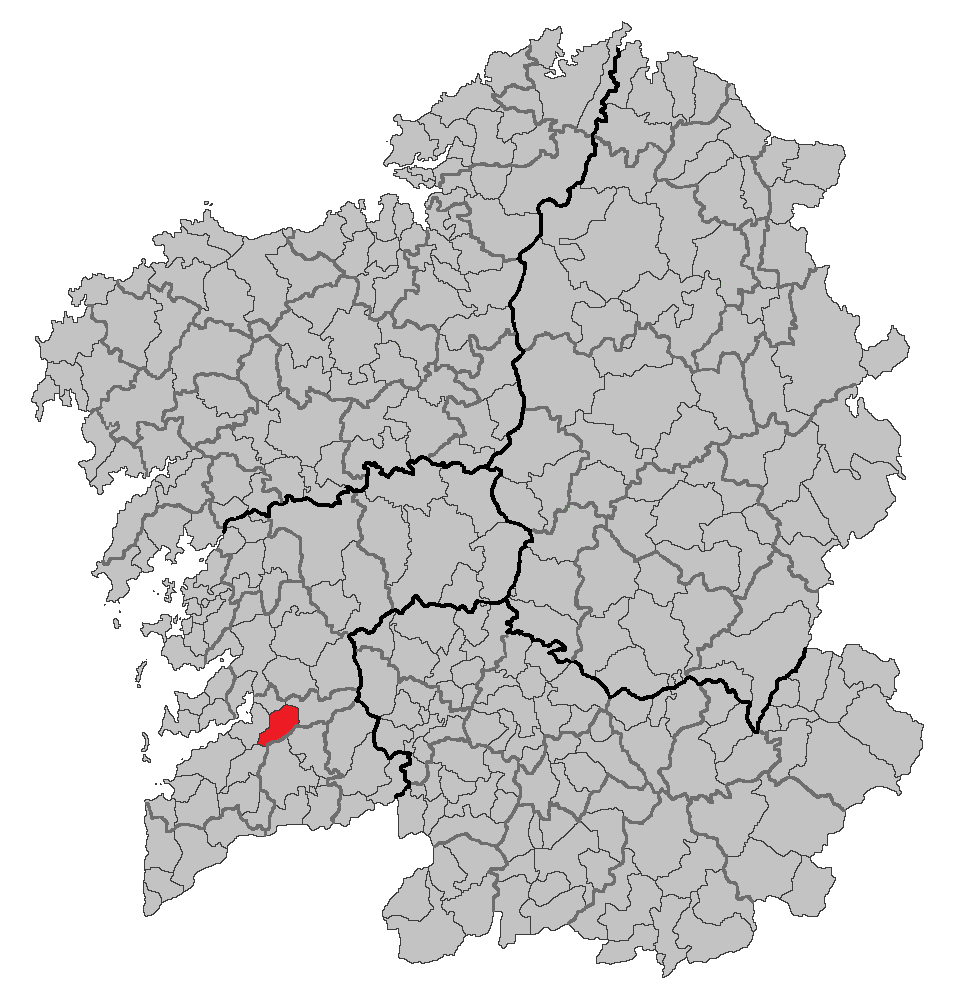
- Situation of Pazos de Borbén within Galicia
- Coordinates: 42.7500°N 8.2667°W
- Country: Spain
- Autonomous community: Galicia
- Province: Pontevedra
- Comarca: Vigo

Population (2025-01-01)
  - Total: 3,046
- Time zone: UTC+1 (CET)
  - Summer (DST): UTC+2 (CET)

Pazos de Borbén is a municipality in the province of Pontevedra, in the autonomous community of Galicia, Spain. It belongs to the comarca of Vigo.

== See also ==
- List of municipalities in Pontevedra
