= Province of Pontevedra =

Province of Pontevedra Provincia de Pontevedra (Spanish) Provincia de Pontevedra (Galician)
- Province
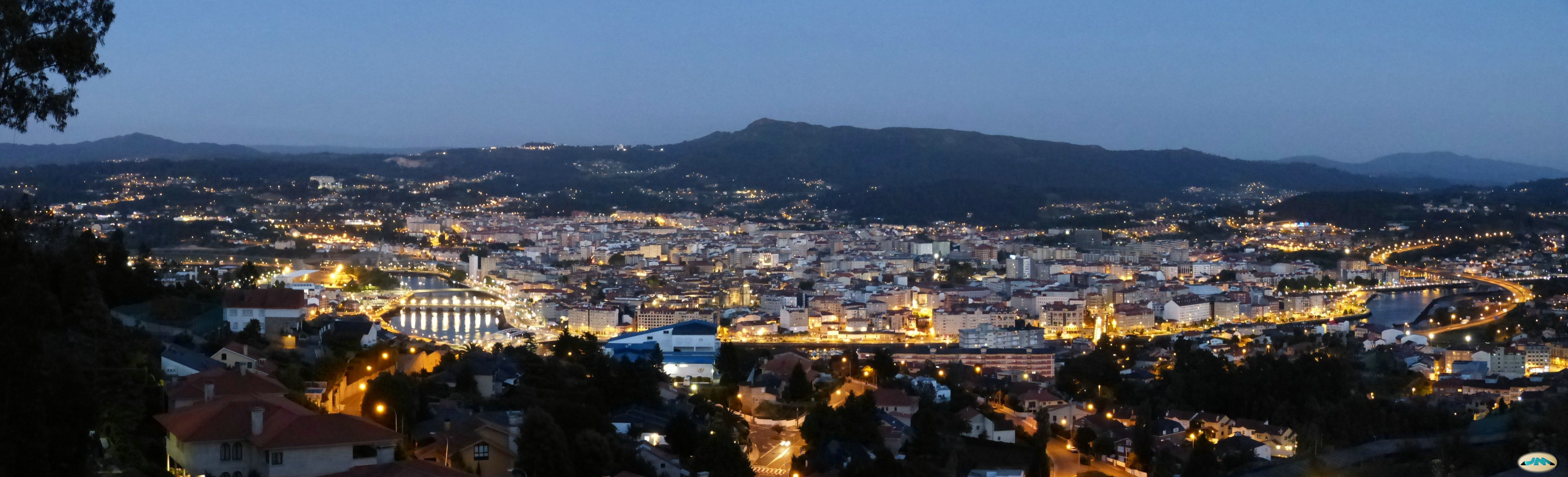
- Pontevedra at night

- Flag Coat of arms

- Location of the Province of Pontevedra in Spain
- Coordinates: 42.37°N 8.40°W
- Country: Spain
- Autonomous community: Galicia
- Capital: Pontevedra
- Municipalities: 61

Government
  - Body: Provincial Deputation of Pontevedra

Area
  - Total: 4,496.95 km^{2} (1,736.28 sq mi)
  - Rank: 45th in Spain

Population (2025)
  - Total: 947,818
  - Rank: 16th in Spain
  - Density: 210.769/km^{2} (545.889/sq mi)
- Demonym(s): Pontevedrés (m), Pontevedresa (f)
- Time zone: UTC+1 (CET)
  - Summer (DST): UTC+2 (CEST)
- Postal code: 36---
- ISO 3166 code: ES-PO
- Website: http://www.depo.gal

The Province of Pontevedra (Spanish: Provincia de Pontevedra, Galician: Provincia de Pontevedra) is a province of Spain, located in the southwestern part of the autonomous community of Galicia. The capital is the namesake city of Pontevedra, however the largest city is Vigo, which is also the largest city in Galicia. It is bordered by the provinces of A Coruña, Lugo, and Ourense, the country of Portugal and the Atlantic Ocean.

The province has a population of 947,818 in an area of 4,496.95 square kilometres (1,736.28 sq mi) across its 61 municipalities.

There is a public institution named the Provincial Deputation of Pontevedra (provincial council), whose head office is in Pontevedra city, that provides direct services to citizens such as technical, financial and technological support to the councils of the 61 municipalities of the province of Pontevedra.

== Geography ==
Province of Pontevedra.

Pontevedra is cut in two parts by the Lérez River. Most of the major tourist attractions in Pontevedra are to the south of the river. Pontevedra features many historical buildings, monuments, and churches.

Much of the Rías Baixas Denominación de Origen (DO) is located in the province. The province similarly shares the Atlantic Islands of Galicia National Park with neighbouring A Coruña province. This region contains the Galician islands of Ons, Cies, Sálvora and Cortegada.

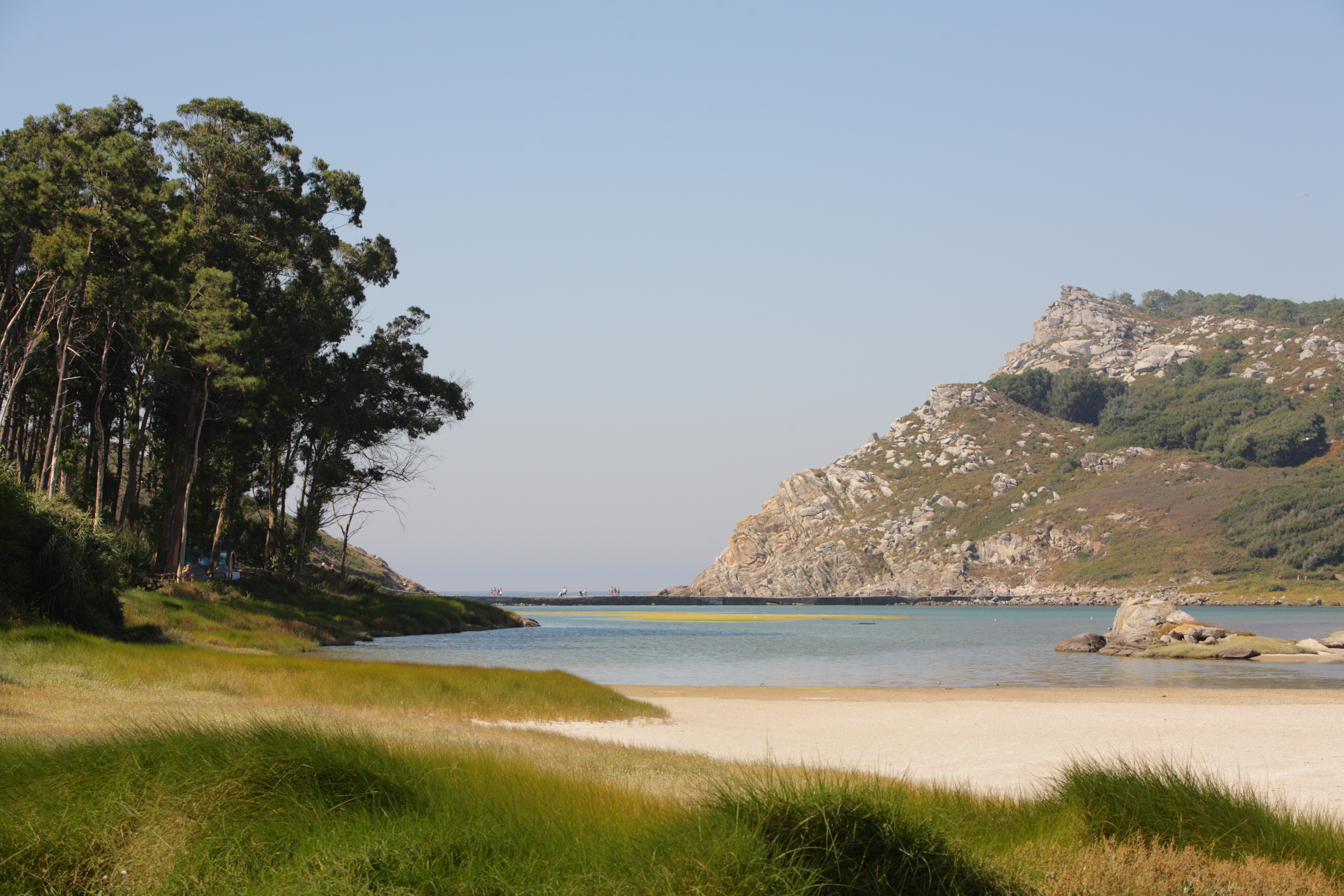
Lago dos Nenos

=== Climate ===
The province has an oceanic climate with warm and relatively dry summers and cool and very wet winters.

== Administrative divisions ==
=== Counties ===
- A Paradanta
- Caldas
- O Baixo Miño
- O Condado
- O Deza
- O Morrazo
- O Salnés
- Pontevedra
- Tabeirós – Terra de Montes
- Vigo

=== Municipalities ===
The province has 61 municipalities:

- A Cañiza
- A Estrada
- A Guarda
- A Illa de Arousa
- A Lama
- Agolada
- Arbo
- As Neves
- Baiona
- Barro
- Bueu
- Caldas de Reis
- Cambados
- Campo Lameiro
- Cangas
- Catoira
- Cerdedo-Cotobade
- Covelo
- Crecente
- Cuntis
- Dozón
- Forcarei
- Fornelos de Montes
- Gondomar
- Lalín
- Marín
- Meaño
- Meis
- Moaña
- Mondariz
- Mondariz-Balneario
- Moraña
- Mos
- Nigrán
- O Grove
- O Porriño
- O Rosal
- Oia
- Pazos de Borbén
- Poio
- Ponte Caldelas
- Ponteareas
- Pontecesures
- Pontevedra
- Portas
- Redondela
- Ribadumia
- Rodeiro
- Salceda de Caselas
- Salvaterra de Miño
- Sanxenxo
- Silleda
- Soutomaior
- Tomiño
- Tui
- Valga
- Vigo
- Vila de Cruces
- Vilaboa
- Vilagarcía de Arousa
- Vilanova de Arousa

== Demographics ==
As of 2025, the population is 947,818, of which 48.3% are male, and 51.7% are female. Minors make up 14.1% of the population, and seniors make up 24.7%.

Historical population

Year	Pop.	±%
1842	302,130	—
1857	428,886	+42.0%
1877	475,443	+10.9%
1887	478,599	+0.7%
1900	495,721	+3.6%
1910	546,247	+10.2%
1920	585,866	+7.3%
1930	630,446	+7.6%
1940	685,801	+8.8%

Year	Pop.	±%
1950	714,666	+4.2%
1960	715,181	+0.1%
1970	781,334	+9.2%
1981	883,267	+13.0%
1991	896,847	+1.5%
2001	903,759	+0.8%
2011	954,877	+5.7%
2021	946,311	−0.9%

Source: INE

=== Immigration ===
As of 2025, immigrants make up 11.2% of the population. The 5 largest foreign countries of birth are Venezuela, Colombia, Brazil, Portugal, and Argentina.

== See also ==
- Galician wine
