= Arbo, Pontevedra =

Arbo
- Concello de Arbo
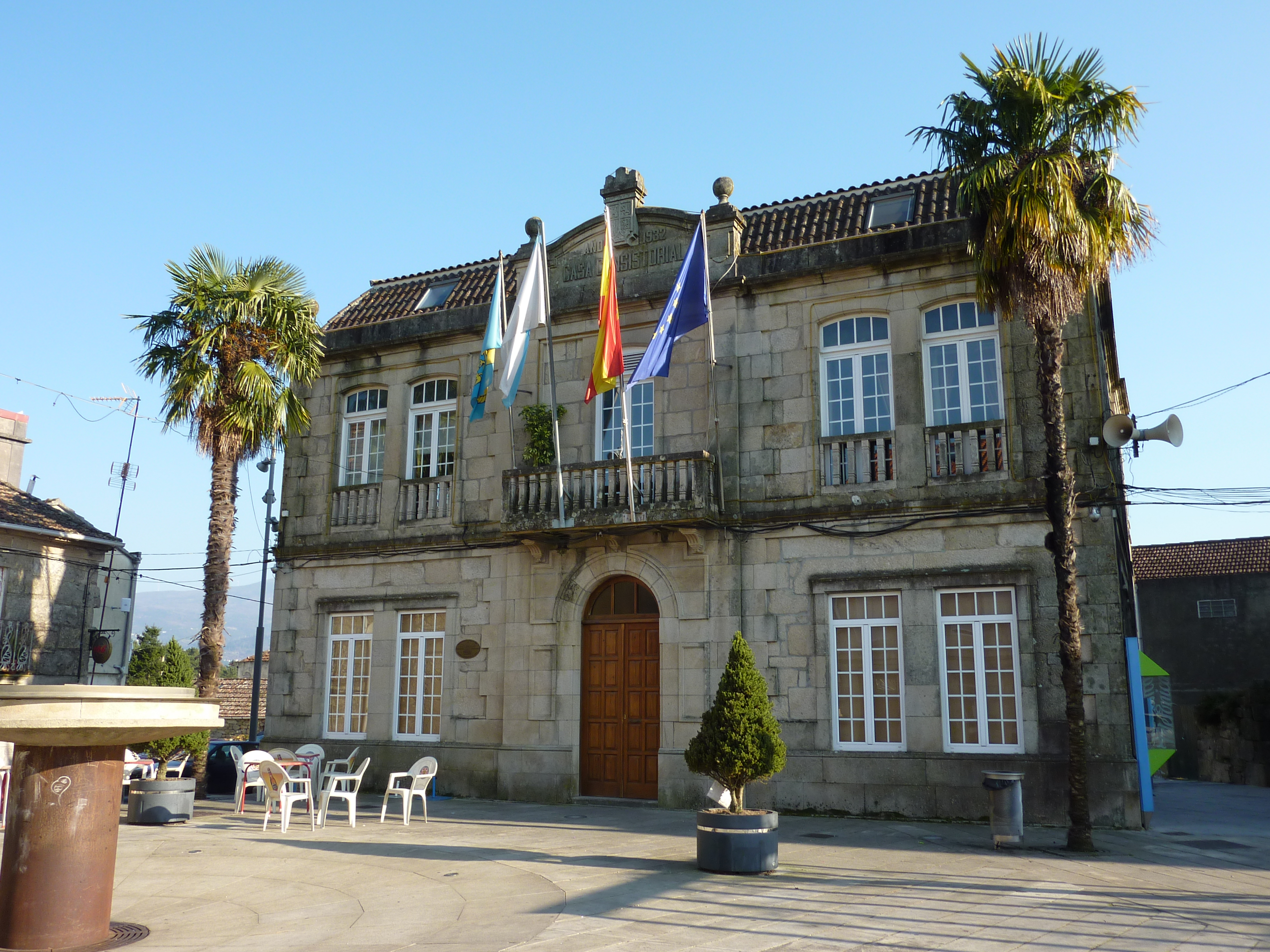

- Flag Coat of arms

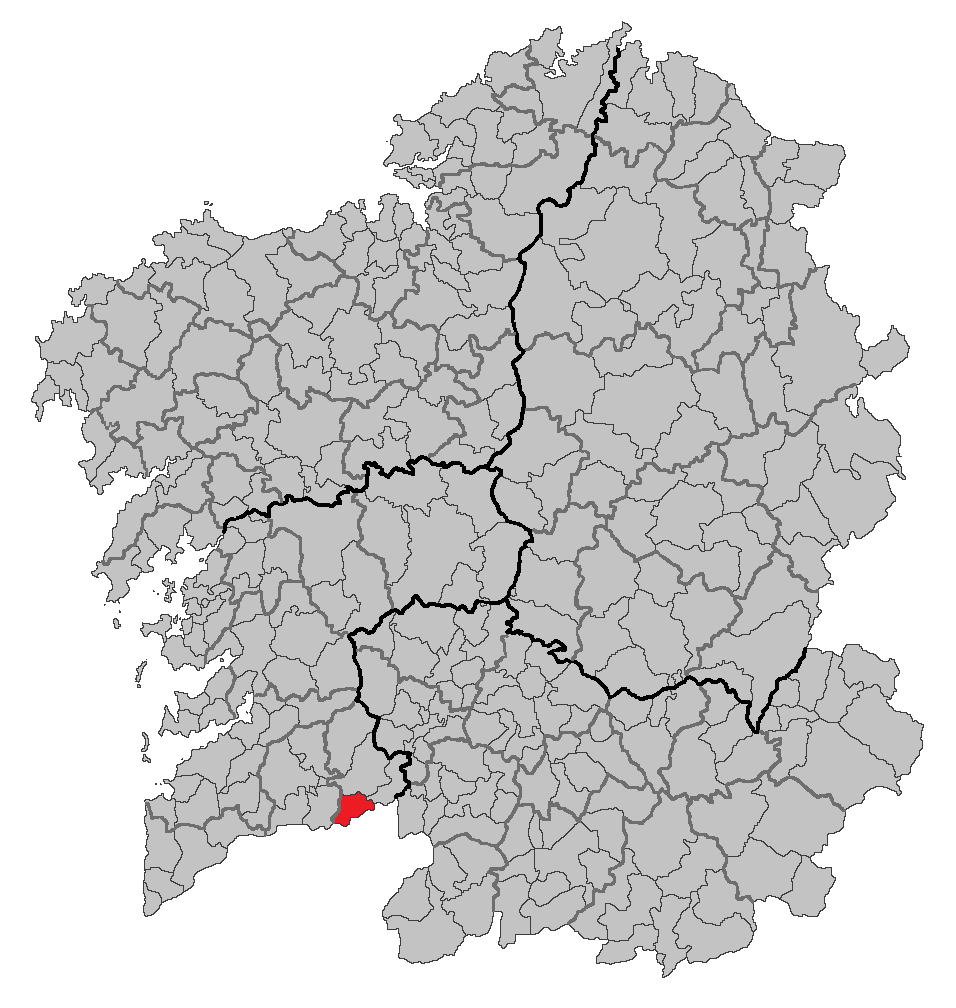
- Location of Arbo within Galicia
- Coordinates: 42°7′N 8°19′W
- Country: Spain
- Autonomous community: Galicia
- Province: Pontevedra

Government
  - Alcalde (Mayor): Xavier Simón Fernández

Area
  - Total: 43.3 km^{2} (16.7 sq mi)

Population (2025-01-01)
  - Total: 2,603
  - Density: 60.1/km^{2} (156/sq mi)
- Time zone: UTC+1 (CET)
  - Summer (DST): UTC+2 (CET)

Arbo is a municipality in Galicia, in the province of Pontevedra. The municipality is known for its annual Lamprey Festival (also the Dry Lamprey Festival, Spanish: Fiesta de la Lamprea Seca), which since 1961 celebrates the culinary traditions of lamprey and local wine.

The festival takes place during April at the Carballeira de Turbel Park.

Lamprey and winestocks are also present in the flag and coat of arms of Arbo.

Population

Year	Pop.	±%
1877	5,753	—
1887	5,744	−0.2%
1900	5,960	+3.8%
1910	6,436	+8.0%
1920	6,514	+1.2%
1930	6,667	+2.3%
1940	6,994	+4.9%

Year	Pop.	±%
1950	7,155	+2.3%
1960	6,061	−15.3%
1970	5,974	−1.4%
1980	5,037	−15.7%
1990	5,053	+0.3%
2000	3,742	−25.9%
2010	3,130	−16.4%

Source: From: INE Archiv

== See also ==
- List of municipalities in Pontevedra
