= O Porriño =

O Porriño Porriño
- Municipality
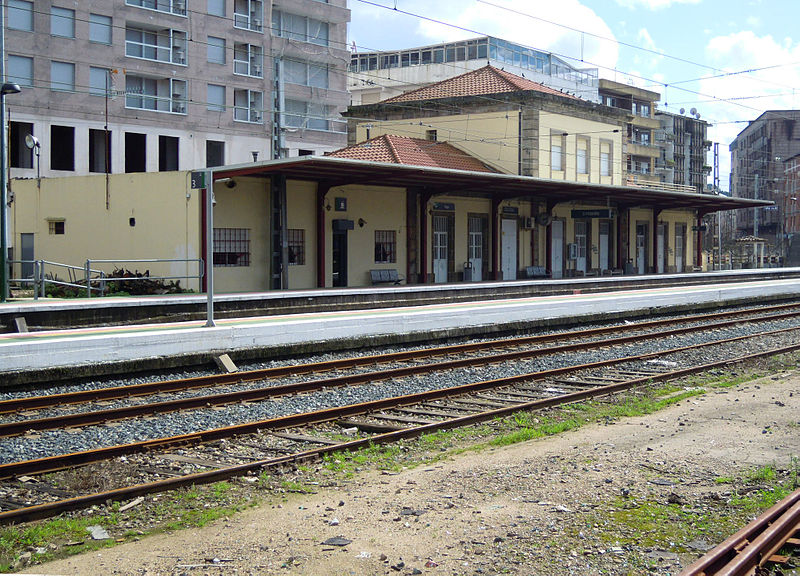
- O Porriño train station (February 2011)

- Coat of arms
- Interactive map of O Porriño
- Location within Spain
- Coordinates: 42.16666°N 8.61666°W
- Country: Spain
- Autonomous Community: Galicia
- Province: Pontevedra
- County: Vigo
- Parrishes: Atios, Budiño, Cans, Chenlo, Mosende, Pontellas, Porriño, Torneiros

Government
  - Type: Mayor–council
  - Body: Concello do Porriño
  - Mayor: Alejandro Lorenzo (PPdeG)

Area
  - Total: 62 km^{2} (24 sq mi)
  - Land: 62 km^{2} (24 sq mi)
  - Water: 0 km^{2} (0 sq mi)
- Elevation: 109 m (358 ft)
- Highest elevation (Monte Galleiro): 744 m (2,441 ft)

Population (2025-01-01)
  - Total: 20,965
  - Rank: 21st in Galicia; 8th in Pontevedra
  - Density: 340/km^{2} (880/sq mi)
- Demonym(s): porriñés, -a
- Time zone: CET (GMT +1)
  - Summer (DST): CEST (GMT +2)
- Post code: 36400
- Area code: +34 986
- Website: Official website

O Porriño is a town and municipality in the province of Pontevedra, in the autonomous community of Galicia, Spain. It belongs to the comarca of Vigo.

As an industrial town in the Vigo metropolitan area, it has an important economic significance. One of its main industries is granite production; the variety of granite produced in O Porriño is known as Rosa Porriño ("Porriño Pink"), which is exported from the Port of Vigo mainly to Italy, Japan and China.

On 9 September 2016, a Portuguese train travelling from Vigo to Porto derailed near O Porriño railway station, killing the driver and at least three other people on board.

== Administration ==
=== Local government ===
The town council (concello) is the body responsible for the governance and administration of the municipality. The plenary is formed by 21 elected municipal councillors who in turn invest the mayor. The council meets at the Casa do Concello on Rúa Antonio Palacios.

=== Administrative subdivisions ===
The municipality is formed of eight parroquias (parishes)

- Atios (Santa Baia)
- Budiño, O Porriño (San Salvador)
- Cans (Santo Estevo)
- Chenlo (San Xoán)
- Mosende (San Diego)
- Pontellas (Santiago)
- O Porriño (Santa María)
- Torneiros (San Salvador)

== Notable people ==
- Antonio Palacios - Architect known for his use of granite on his works, such as the Cybele Palace in Madrid, the Garcia Barbon Theatre in Vigo, O Porriño's town hall, etc. (1872–1945)
- Claudio Giráldez - Retired footballer and head coach of RC Celta Fortuna.
- Andrea Pérez Alonso - Sporting Lisboa basketball player.

== See also ==
- List of municipalities in Pontevedra
