= Baiona, Pontevedra =

Baiona
- Town and municipality
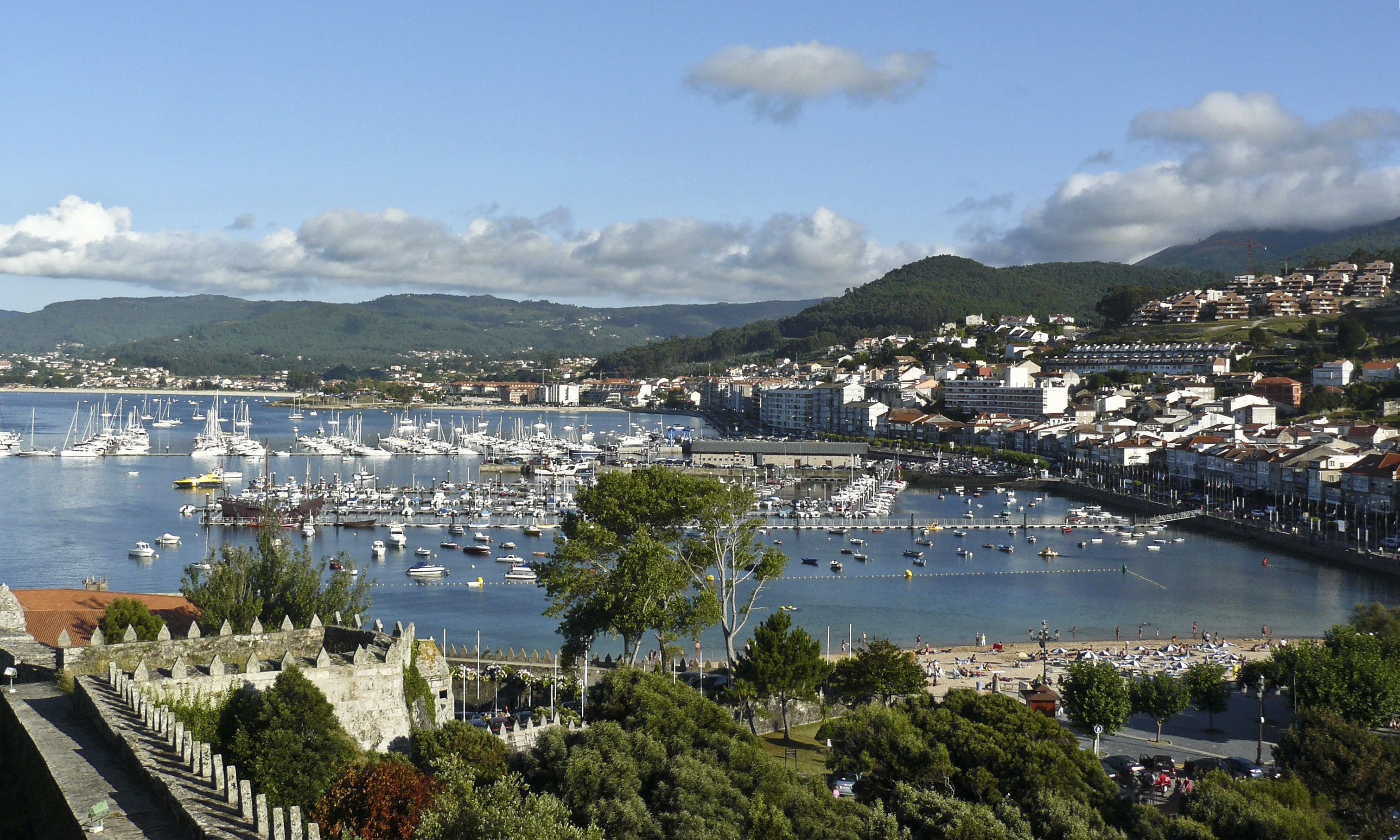
- View of the port from the Montereal castle.

- Flag Coat of arms
- Nickname: Baiona
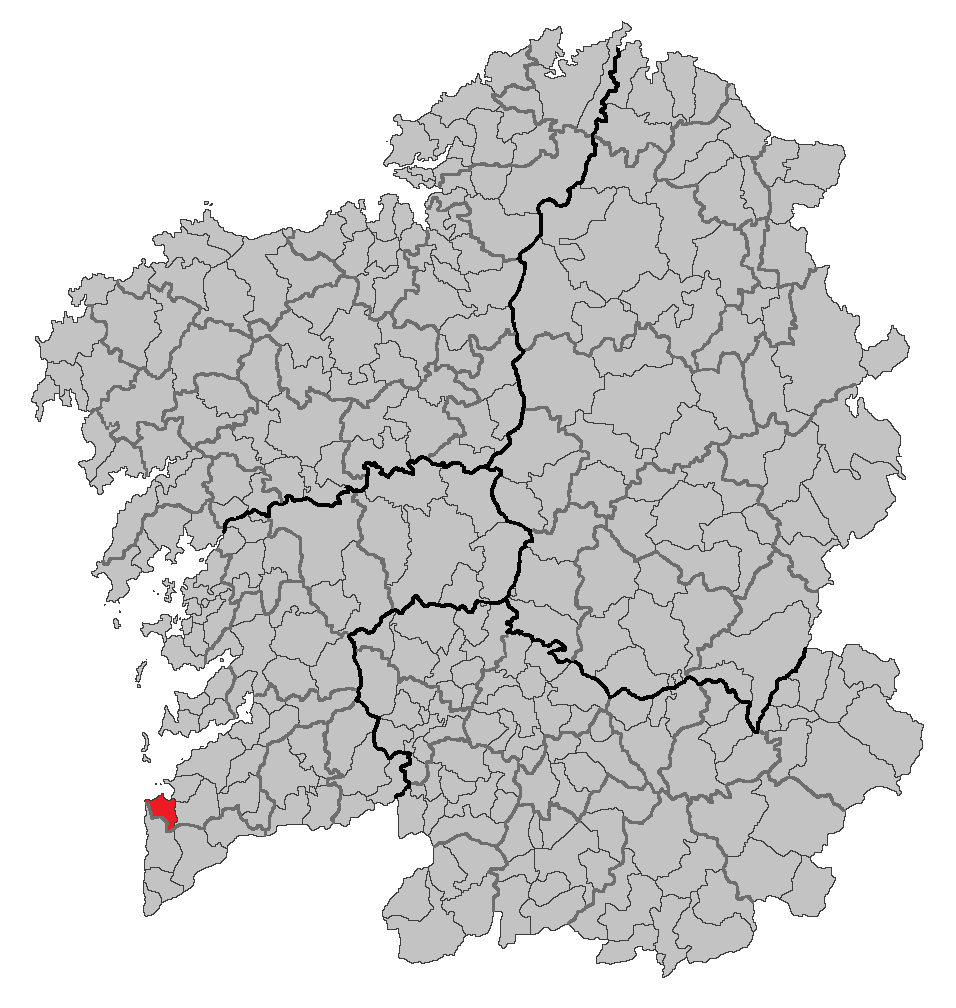
- Situation of Baiona within Galicia
- Coordinates: 42°7′4″N 8°51′2″W
- Country: Spain
- Autonomous community: Galicia
- Province: Pontevedra
- Comarca: Vigo
- Parroquias: Baiona, Baredo, Baíña, Belesar, Sabaris

Government
  - Alcalde (Mayor): Ángel Rodal Almuíña

Area
  - Total: 35.35 km^{2} (13.65 sq mi)

Population (2025-01-01)
  - Total: 12,361
  - Density: 349.7/km^{2} (905.7/sq mi)
- Time zone: UTC+1 (CET)
  - Summer (DST): UTC+2 (CET)
- Website: Official website

Baiona is a municipality in the province of Pontevedra, in the autonomous community of Galicia, Spain. It belongs to the comarca of Vigo.

It is a tourist town with a medieval historical center situated by the outlet of the Vigo Bay. Its population of just over 11,000 rises to around 45,000 in summer, if one includes the tourists. Since it is on the Portuguese Way, one pilgrimage route of the Camino de Santiago 30,000 hikers also visit the town every year. Other than tourism the major economic activities revolve around fishing.

== History ==
It was founded in 140 BC by Diomedes of Aetolia. Throughout its history it has had several names including Stuciana, Abóriga, Balcagia, and Erizana. In 1201 King Alfonso IX of Leon granted the town a royal charter. In 1370, King Ferdinand I of Portugal, who was proclaimed King of Castile took up residence in the town and established his seat there until being forced to return to Portugal. In 1474, Baiona was seized by Don Pedro Alvarez de Soutomaior, also known as Pedro Madruga, Count of Caminha. On March 1, 1493, the Pinta, one of the ships from Columbus' voyage to the New World returned to Europe and arrived in Baiona, making the town's port the first to receive news of the discovery of America. A replica of the ship can be visited, and the event is celebrated every year.

In 1585 the inhabitants of Baiona repelled an attempt by the privateer Francis Drake to take the town. Five years later, Philip II of Spain beat the pirates that were laying the Galician coast to waste with a fleet of 98 vessels and 17,000 soldiers.

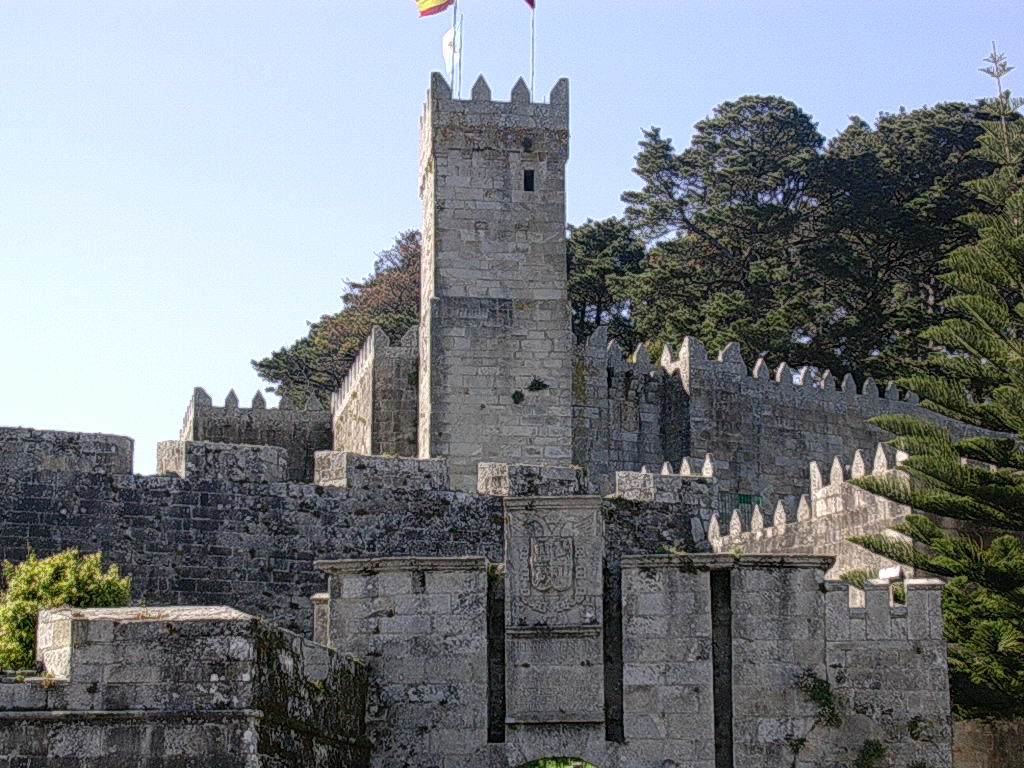
Montereal castle

== Population ==
From: INE Archiv

== Economy ==
The economy in Baiona is focused on tourism. The Parador de Baiona stands out from all the hotels in the village. Other activities are retail, subsistence agriculture, coastal fishing and construction.

== Places of interest ==
Parador of Baiona. Belonging to Paradores (state-owned hotel network), it is a good example of well-preserved history. Surrounded by a stone wall, on a small peninsula, the old hotel and restaurant overlook the entrance of the Rias Baixas and the Cies Islands.

Monte Real Yacht Club Baiona. The yacht club, founded in 1965, is next to the Parador. The club is host to international regattas and home to a sailing school, bringing maritime tourists to the city.

== See also ==
- List of municipalities in Pontevedra
