= Vilasobroso, Mondariz =

Vilasobroso
- Minor local entity
- San Martiño de Vilasobroso
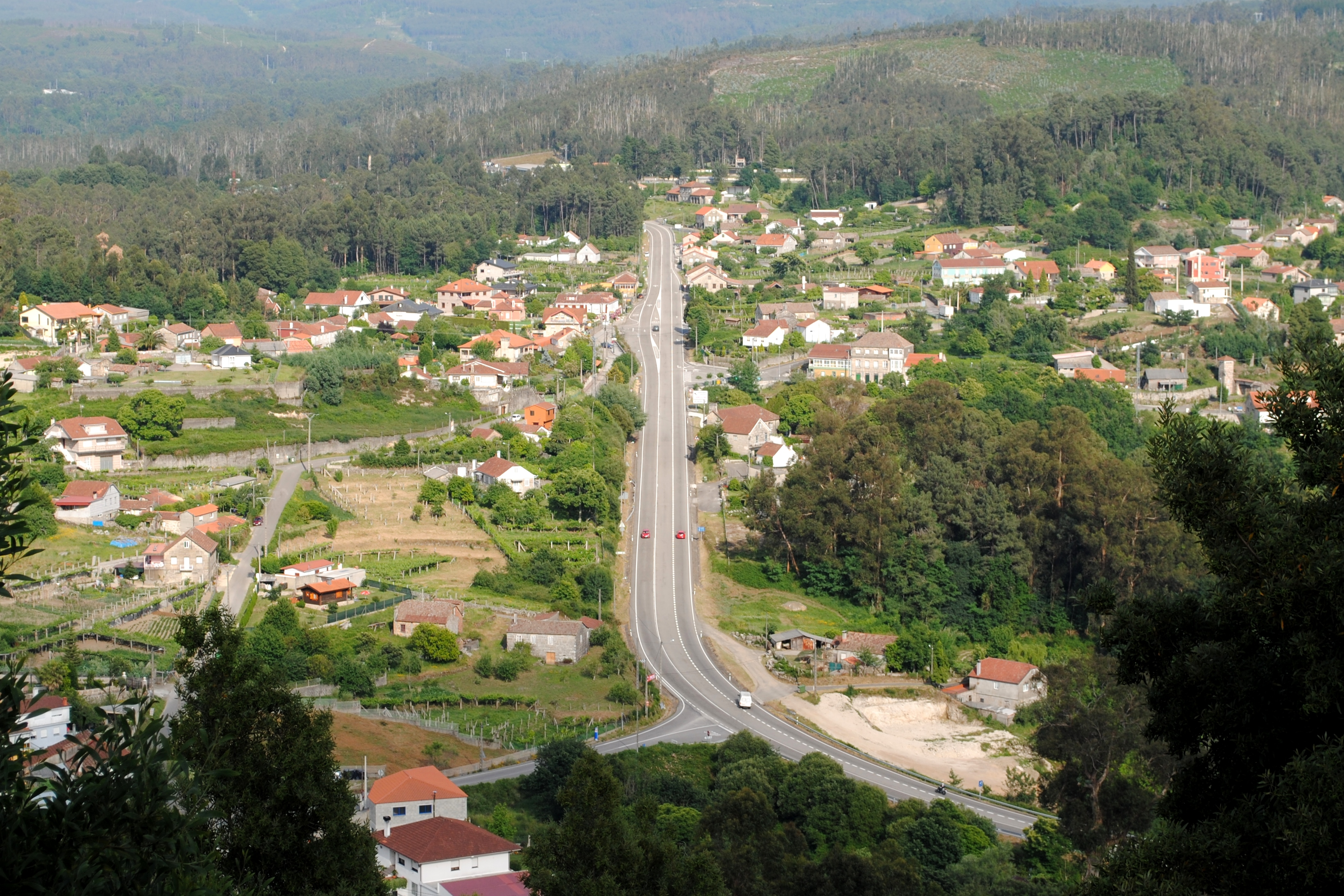
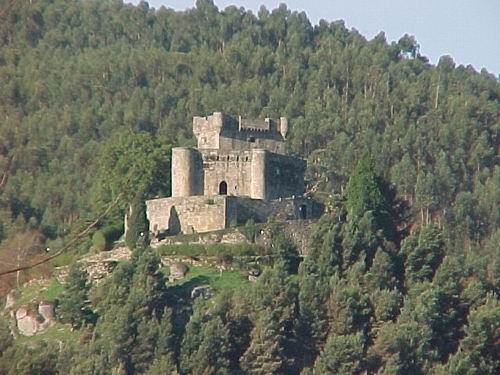
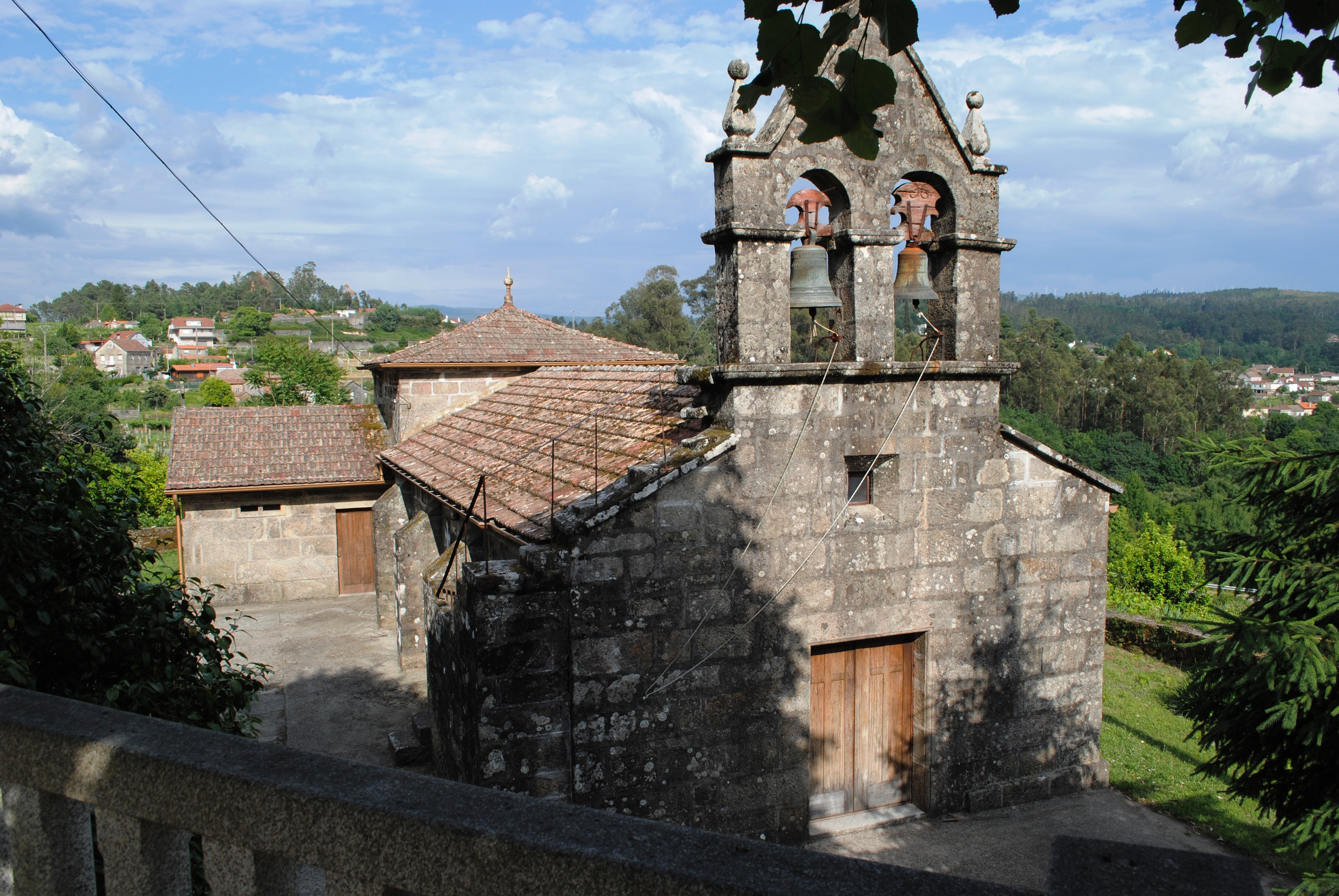
- View of Vilasobroso from the castle Sobroso Castle Parish Church of San Martiño

- Flag Coat of arms
- Motto(s): Labor et Gloria (Work and Glory)
- Interactive map of Vilasobroso
- Location within Spain Location within Europe
- Coordinates: 42.204616°N 8.459886°W
- Country: Spain
- Autonomous community: Galicia
- Province: Pontevedra
- County: O Condado
- Municipality: Mondariz
- First recorded: 1170
- MLE status: 13 September 1924
- Neighbourhoods: Cruceiro, A Pena, Saniñáns, Veigadraga

Government
  - Type: Mayor–council
  - Body: Xunta de Goberno da Entidade Local Menor de Vilasobroso
  - Mayor: Alexandre Estévez Gil (BNG)

Area
  - Total: 5.18 km^{2} (2.00 sq mi)
- Highest elevation (Monte Landín): 459 m (1,506 ft)

Population (2025)
  - Total: 362 ▲
  - Density: 69.9/km^{2} (181/sq mi)
- Demonym(s): Sobrosene sobroseño (m), sobroseña (f)
- Time zone: CET (GMT +1)
  - Summer (DST): CEST (GMT +2)
- Postal code: 36879
- Patron saints: Saint Lucy
- INE code: 36030120000

Vilasobroso, (Note: Galician pronunciation: [ˌbilasoˈβɾoso]) officially known as San Martiño de Vilasobroso, is a village in the southwest of Galicia, Spain. It is best known for its restored castle, one of the few remaining in the region, rebuilt after its destruction in the Irmandinho revolts.

It is both a civil parish within the municipality of Mondariz and an independent minor local entity – an administrative division sitting directly below a municipality, of which there are only nine in the whole of Galicia.

== Name ==
Until 1926, the parish was known as San Martín de Portela, in dedication to Martin of Tours. The village housed Sobroso Castle, whose name alluded to the sobreiras, the cork trees that once surrounded the castle. In recognition of this heritage, the local authority petitioned to have the name changed to Villasobroso. (Note: Spanish pronunciation: [bˌiʎasoβɾˈoso])

In 1998, in accordance with the 1983 Law of Linguistic Normalisation, the central government officially recognised the Galician spelling, Vilasobroso, as the official name in both Galician and Spanish.

In 2026 the Royal Galician Academy carried out a revision of place names in Galicia, in which the village became known by its full parochial name, San Martiño de Vilasobroso.

== Geography ==
=== Location ===
Vilasobroso lies in the southern half of the province of Pontevedra, at the foot of Landín Hill, the highest point in the parish. The Xabriña river, a tributary of the Tea river, forms a natural boundary along its north-eastern edge.

Covering 5.18 km², the parish is bordered to the north by the tiny municipality of Mondariz Balneario and to the south by the parishes of San Lourenzo de Oliveira and Cumiar, in the neighbouring municipality of Ponteareas.

== History ==
The history of Vilasobroso is closely tied to the castle and its domain. It is first recorded in 1170, in a royal charter of donation granted by Ferdinand II of León to the bishop of Tui, Juan. In this document, the settlement is one of several mentioned as being sub Castello de Suberoso ("below the Castle of Sobroso") under the name Villa San Martini de Portela. As part of the bishopric of Tui, San Martín de Portela belonged to the Archpriesthood of Salvatierra, one of the territorial divisions through which the bishopric organised its parishes.

On 19 August 1397, the lordship passed to Pedro Ruiz Sarmiento, Lord of Ribadavia following a petition to John I of Castile.

San Martín de Portela became a minor local entity on 13 September 1924, when its establishment was approved at a meeting of Mondariz town council, with local journalist and castle restorer, Alejo Carrera Muñoz (1893–1967) appointed as its first mayor.

== Administration ==
=== Local government ===
As a minor local entity the village has its own form of government: the junta vecinal (neighbourhood council), made up of a mayor (alcalde pedáneo) directly elected by the ward and four councillors (vocales) based on the election results in the ward in the municipal election. The current mayor is Alexandre Estévez Gil of the Galician Nationalist Bloc.

2023 Spanish local elections: Vilasobroso
Party	Candidate	Votes	%
Galician Nationalist Bloc	Alexandre Estévez Gil	90	37.81
People's Party	Francisco Rico Carvalho	61	25.63
Alternativa por Mondariz	Jesús Vázquez Estévez	45	18.90
Socialists' Party of Galicia	Mónica Lloves León	29	12.18
Rejected ballots		9	3.78
Blank ballots		4	1.68

The local council meets in the old school building, now repurposed as a community centre, while the village archives are housed in the former market hall.

=== International relations ===
Since 2013, Vilasobroso has been twinned with the freguesia of Sobrosa, in the municipality of Paredes, Portugal.

== Demographics ==
According to the 2025 census the village has a population of 362 (180 men and 182 women) distributed across four neighbourhoods: Cruceiro, A Pena, Saniñáns and Veigadraga.

== Transport ==
The village is bisected by the N-120 national road, now superseded by the A-52 highway, which links southern Galicia's major towns and cities to the meseta. The provincial PO-402 road running south connects the village to the town of Salvaterra de Miño and, by extension, the Portuguese border, while the PO-262 leads to the centre of Mondariz.

There are regular and on-demand bus services operated by bus companies under tender through the Transporte Público de Galicia bus network. The primary service is the Norte das Comarcas da Paradanta e O Condado line (XG622), operated by Monbus, running from A Caniza to Vigo.

== See also ==
- Queimadelos – another minor local entity in Mondariz
- Soutomaior – municipality with a medieval castle in Pontevedra province

== Bibliography ==
- Márquez Paramés, José (1985). Guía histórica de Villasobroso y su castillo (in Spanish). Vigo: Talleres Gráfiloira.
- Márquez Paramés, José (2002). Sobroso Baluarte Histórico de Galicia (in Spanish). Vigo: Fama. ISBN 84-88272-29-4.
