= Angoares, Ponteareas =

Angoares
- Parish
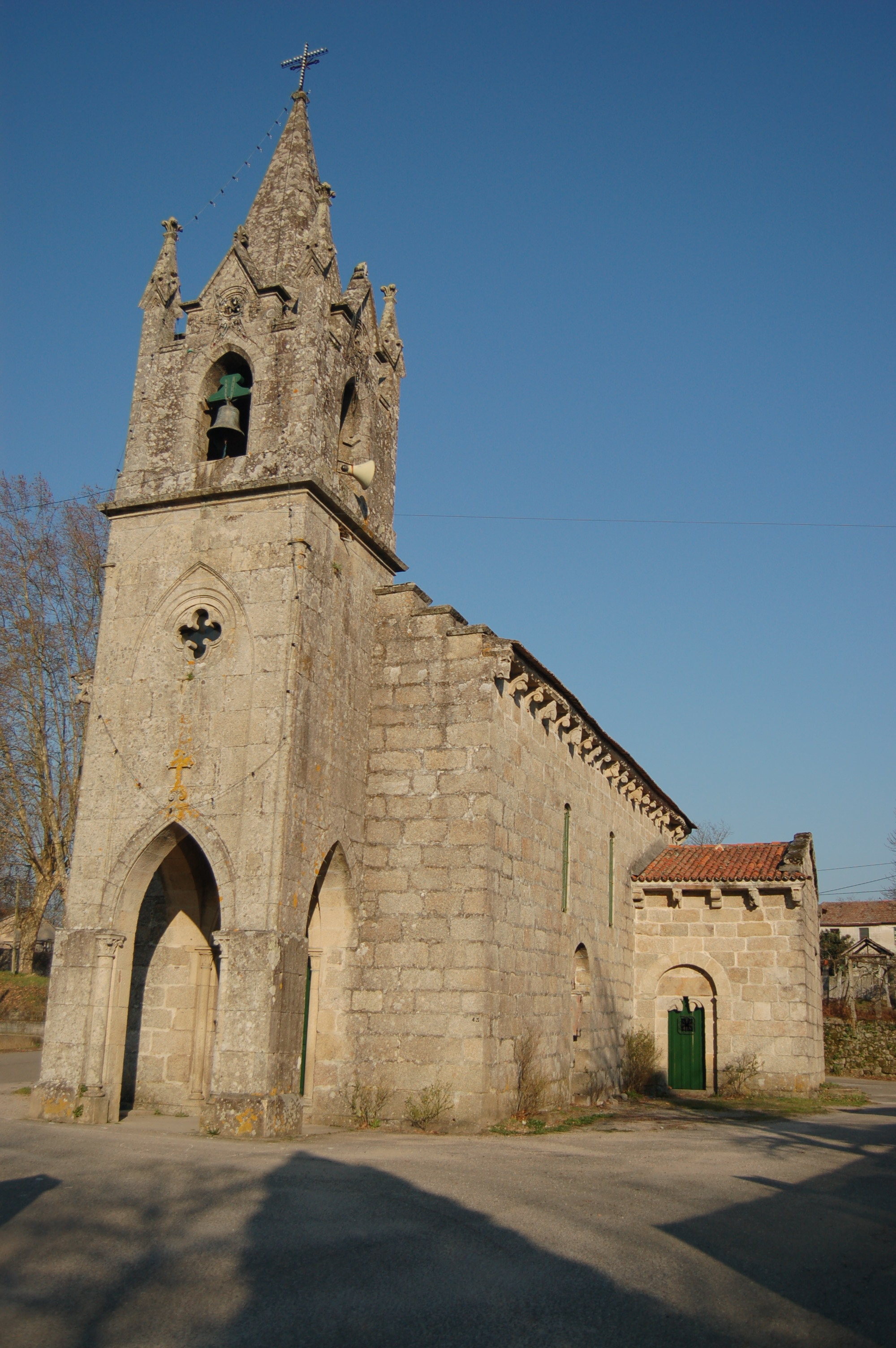
- Parish church of San Pedro
- Interactive map of Angoares
- Coordinates: 42.164833°N 8.506667°W
- Country: Spain
- Region: Galicia
- Province: Pontevedra
- Comarca: O Condado
- Municipality: Ponteareas
- Lugares: A Abelleira, O Cabalón, O Carballal, Picón, As Searas, A Valboa

Population (2004)
  - Total: 482
- Time zone: CET (GMT +1)
  - Summer (DST): CEST (GMT +2)
- Post code: 36867
- Area code: +34 986 66
- Patron saints: Saint Peter
- Website: http://www.ponteareas.org

San Pedro de Angoares is a parish, and village, of the municipality of Ponteareas. According to the electoral register of 2004 it has a population of 482 inhabitants (253 women and 229 men). The parish church of San Pedro is located in the lugar of O Carballal.

== Divisions ==
The village of Angoares is formed by 5 rural settlements known as aldeas or lugares.

- A Abelleiran
- O Carballal
- O Picón
- As Searas
- A Valboa
- O Cabalón

== Notable people ==
- Alfonso Pexegueiro, writer (1948–)
