= Las Nieves =

Las Nieves (Spanish for the Snows, and sometimes taken from María de las Nieves or Nuestra Señora de las Nieves referring to Mary, mother of Jesus) may mean:

- Las Nieves, Galicia - (As Neves in Galician) in Spain
- Las Nieves, Agusan del Norte - in the Philippines
- Las Nieves, Durango - in Mexico
- Nevis - a Caribbean island, has a similar etymology.
