= Sobroso Castle =

Medieval castle in Vilasobroso, Galicia, Spain

- Castelo de Sobroso; Castillo de Sobroso
- Vilasobroso - Mondariz, Pontevedra, Galicia, Spain
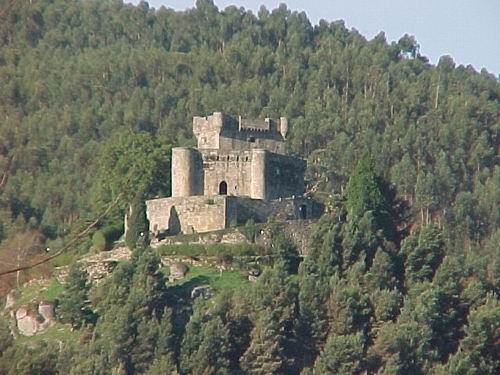

Site information
- Type: Castle
- Owner: Concello de Ponteareas
- Operator: Diputación de Pontevedra
- Open to the public: Yes
- Condition: Restored

Location
- Location of Sobroso Castle within Galicia
- Location within Galicia
- Coordinates: 42.205972°N 8.46375°W
- Height: 13 m (42 ft 8 in)

Site history
- Built: 9th century
- Materials: Stone
- Battles/wars: Battle of Portela Arenaria; Irmandiño revolt
- Events: Imprisonment and escape of Urraca of León and Castile

Sobroso Castle (Spanish: Castillo de Sobroso, Galician: Castelo de Sobroso) is a medieval castle in the village of Vilasobroso in Galicia, Spain.

== Location ==
The castle is located in Vilasobroso, a village in the municipality of Mondariz, belonging to the comarca of O Condado. It sits on Landín Hill, overlooking the Condado valley, right up to the Portuguese border. Due to its strategic position, the castle was known as "the key of the Kingdom of Galicia".

== Etymology ==
The name of the Castle, and the village itself, comes from the Latin SUBEROSUM, in reference to the 'sobreiras', Quercus suber or cork trees that once surrounded it.

== History ==
The castle was restored from its ruinous state thanks to the efforts of local journalist Alejo Carrera Muñoz, who in 1923 bought the ruins of the castle from the Count of Torre Cedeira for the sum of 5,000 pesetas. He carried out the restoration work single-handedly, without any help from local authorities, until his death in 1967. In 1981, the neighbouring municipality of Ponteareas purchased the castle from Carrera's only child, Zita Teresa Carrera Ferreira, for 30 million pesetas. From 1995 onwards, the local council began their own restoration work on the castle.

The castle currently houses a cultural and ethnographic museum.

== Ownership ==
In 2014, Ponteareas town council signed an agreement ceding the castle to the provincial council of Pontevedra for 10 years. As part of the agreement the provincial council would carry out renovations to the castle and promote the castle alongside the more well-known castles of Soutomaior and Baiona.

== See also ==
- Marquisate of Sobroso
