= Mondariz-Balneario =

- Municipality
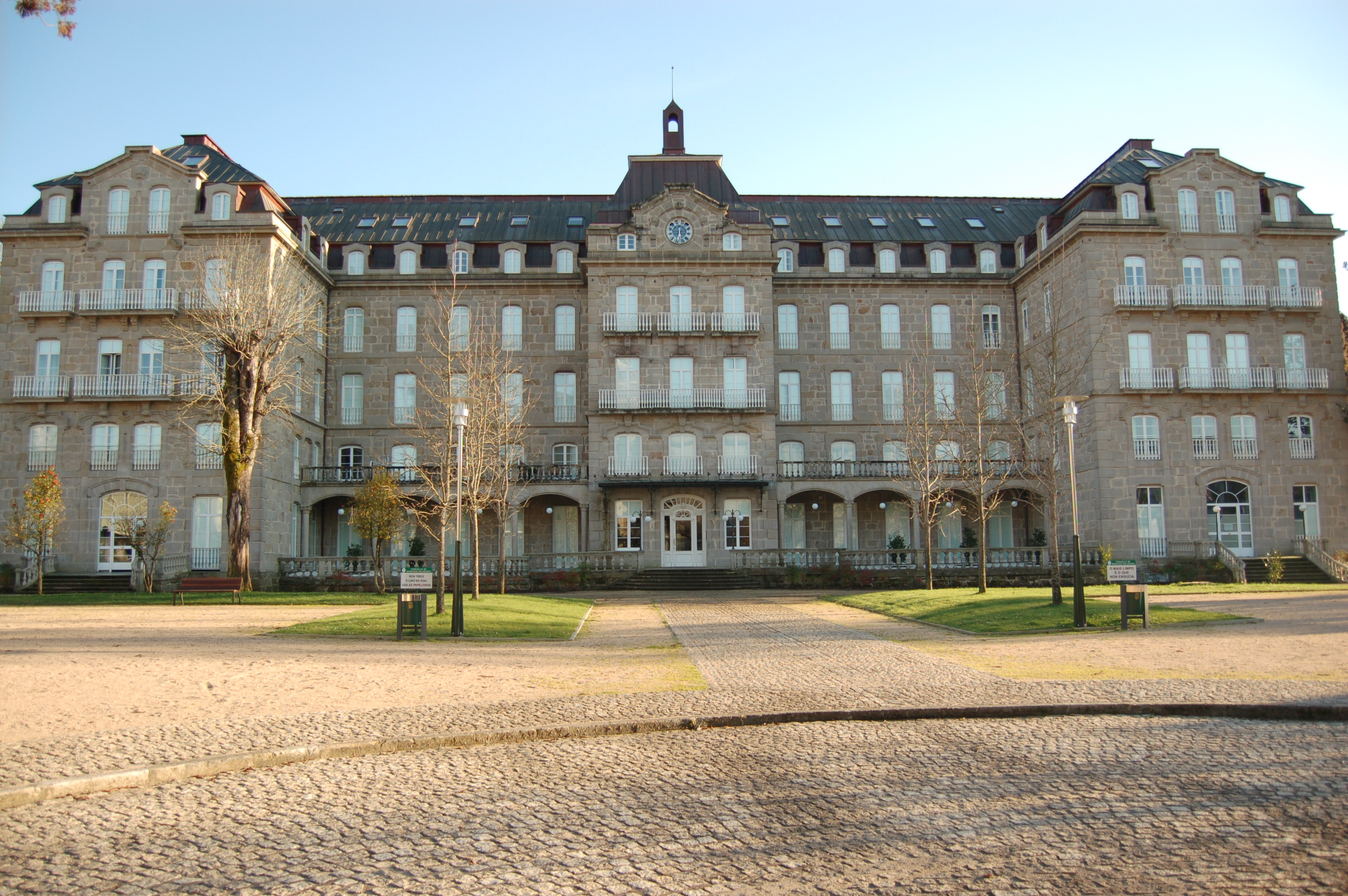
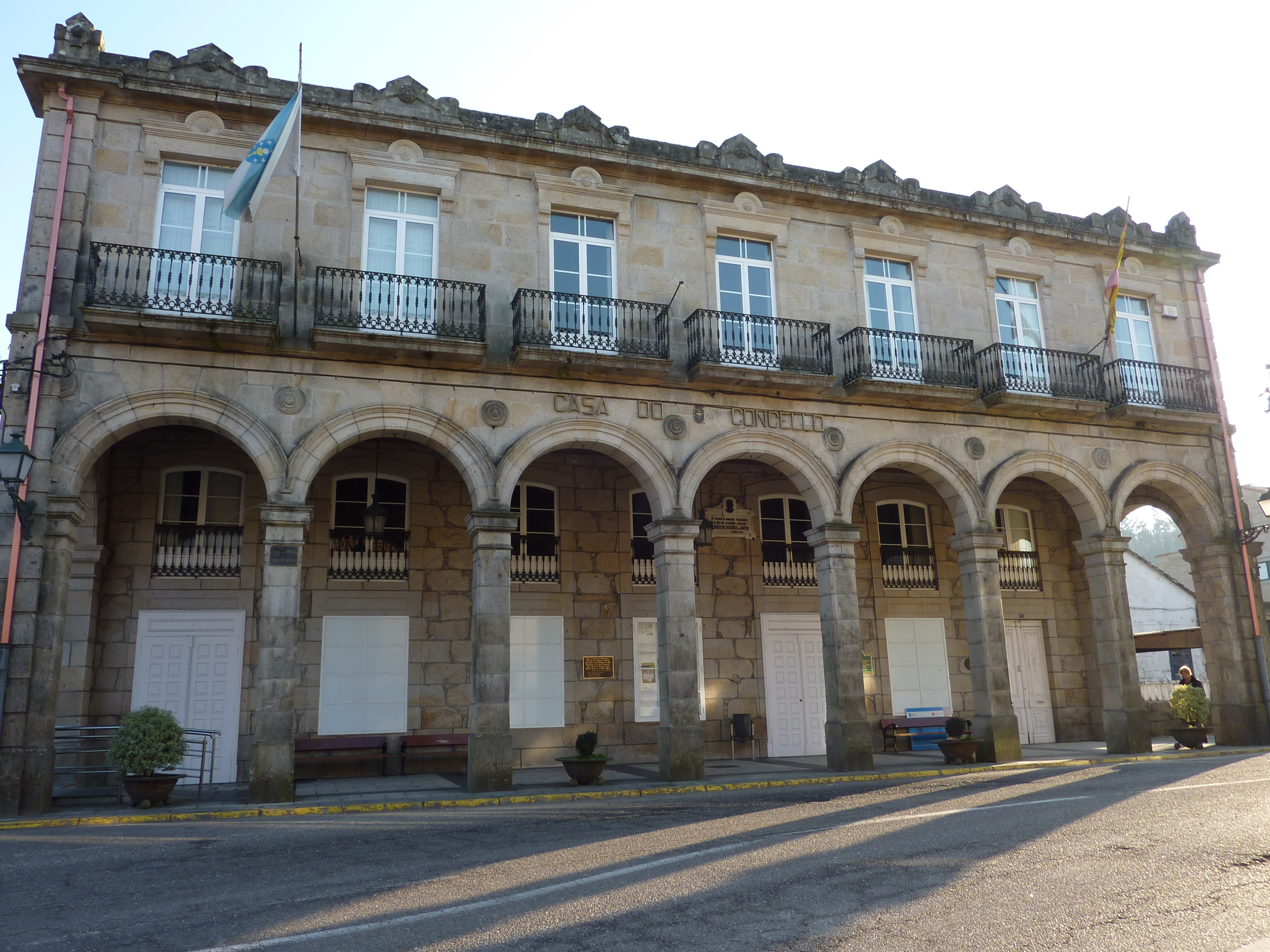
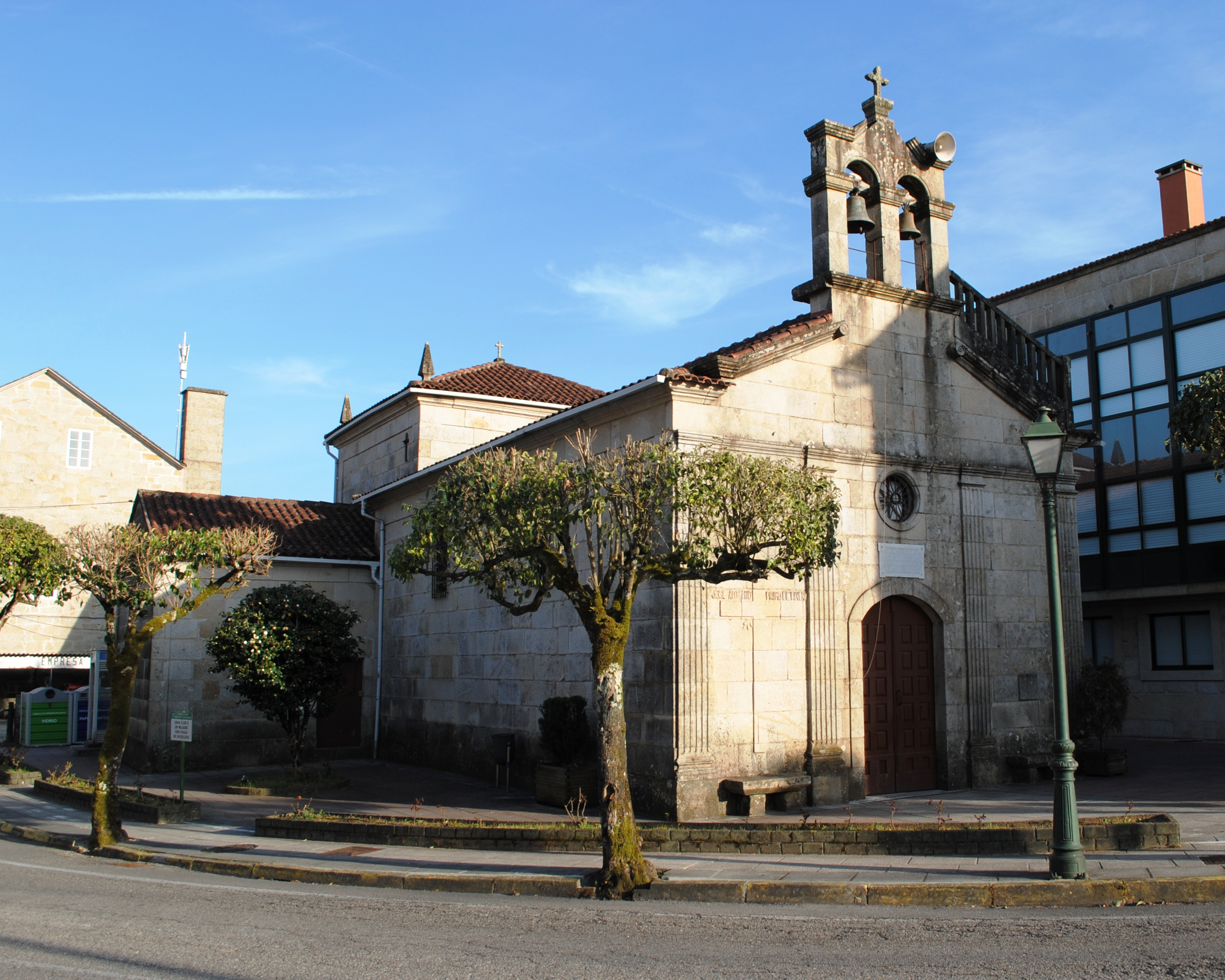
- Grand Hotel building Town Hall Parish church

- Coat of arms
- Interactive map of Mondariz-Balneario
- Coordinates: 42°13′33″N 8°28′8″W
- Country: Spain
- Region: Galicia
- Province: Pontevedra
- County: O Condado
- Lesser Local Entity: August 1924
- Municipality: October 25, 1924; 101 years ago
- Parish: Mondariz-Balneario

Government
  - Type: Mayor–council
  - Body: Concello da Moi Hospitalaria Vila de Mondariz Balneario
  - Mayor: José Antonio Lorenzo Rodríguez (PPdeG)

Area
  - Total: 2.4 km^{2} (0.93 sq mi)
  - Rank: 313th in Galicia

Population (2025-01-01)
  - Total: 742 ▲
  - Density: 310/km^{2} (800/sq mi)
- Demonym: mondaricense del Balneario
- Postal code: 36890
- INE code: 36031
- Website: www.mondarizbalneario.es

Mondariz-Balneario is a spa town and municipality in Galicia, Spain. Originally, a simple parish of the neighbouring town of Mondariz, known as Troncoso, it developed into a spa town in the late 19th century following the popularisation of its water which was reputed to have medicinal qualities. It has the distinction of being the smallest municipality in Galicia and one of the smallest in Spain with an area of 2.4 km².

== History ==
=== Ancient and medieval history ===
It is known through archaeological remains that the site now occupied by the town was inhabited from prehistoric times, which establishes the existence of a fort in the Coto Cividade as well as in Roman times, as in Pias neighboring parish are remains of Roman amphorae, various ceramic and bronze coins confirming the occupation.

However, the finding of greater magnitude and Roman is the best proof that Mondariz-Balneario was romanized, are remains of a Roman road near the stands, on or river Tea, Cernadela bridge, also of Roman origin.

Tradition has it that in 1282 and in the chapel of San Pedro which is situated in this county, took place the marriage of King Diniz of Portugal to the Princess Isabella of Aragon, daughter of Peter III and later became known as Isabel of Portugal.

=== Contemporary history ===
In the new division of Pontevedra municipalities, in accordance with Royal Decree of 23 June 1835, it was included in the parish of Mondariz as a mere territory, and as reflected in his writings Florida Blanca, it was under the jurisdiction of Sobrosa, being dependent of Don Juan Lago, the Marquis de Valladares and the Marquis de Sobrosa.

In 1904 the parish becomes Troncoso, a newly created parish whose territories were dispersed from the parish of Santa Eulalia de Mondariz dependent of Mondariz parish.

In 1924, after the change of name to the parish of Our Lady of Lourdes it becomes an independent municipality on November 30 with the current name Mondariz-Balneario. Balneario is the Spanish word for spa resort, referring the host-medical establishment that had provided the necessary economic strength to support its emancipation from Mondariz.

Thus, the history of Mondariz-Balneario is closely related to Don Sabino Peinador Enrique Vela, who made the aforementioned neighborhood Troncoso renowned spa, thanks to which appeared the town.

Since April 17, 1925 the town of Mondariz-Balneario holds the title of "Very hospitable villa" granted by King Alfonso XIII and General Primo de Rivera in thanks to good treatment received from the neighbors in their frequent visits to the Grand Hotel.

The Grand Hotel, that opened in 1898 and hosted very important guests in the early twentieth century, started its decline after the Spanish Civil War. In 1973 a devastating fire destroyed the Grand Hotel and left the building in ruins until 2005, when it was rebuilt to house private apartments. In the meantime, a new hotel and spa was built in the adjacent buildings, and nowadays Mondariz-Balneario remains as one of the most important spa resorts in Galicia.

== Sights ==
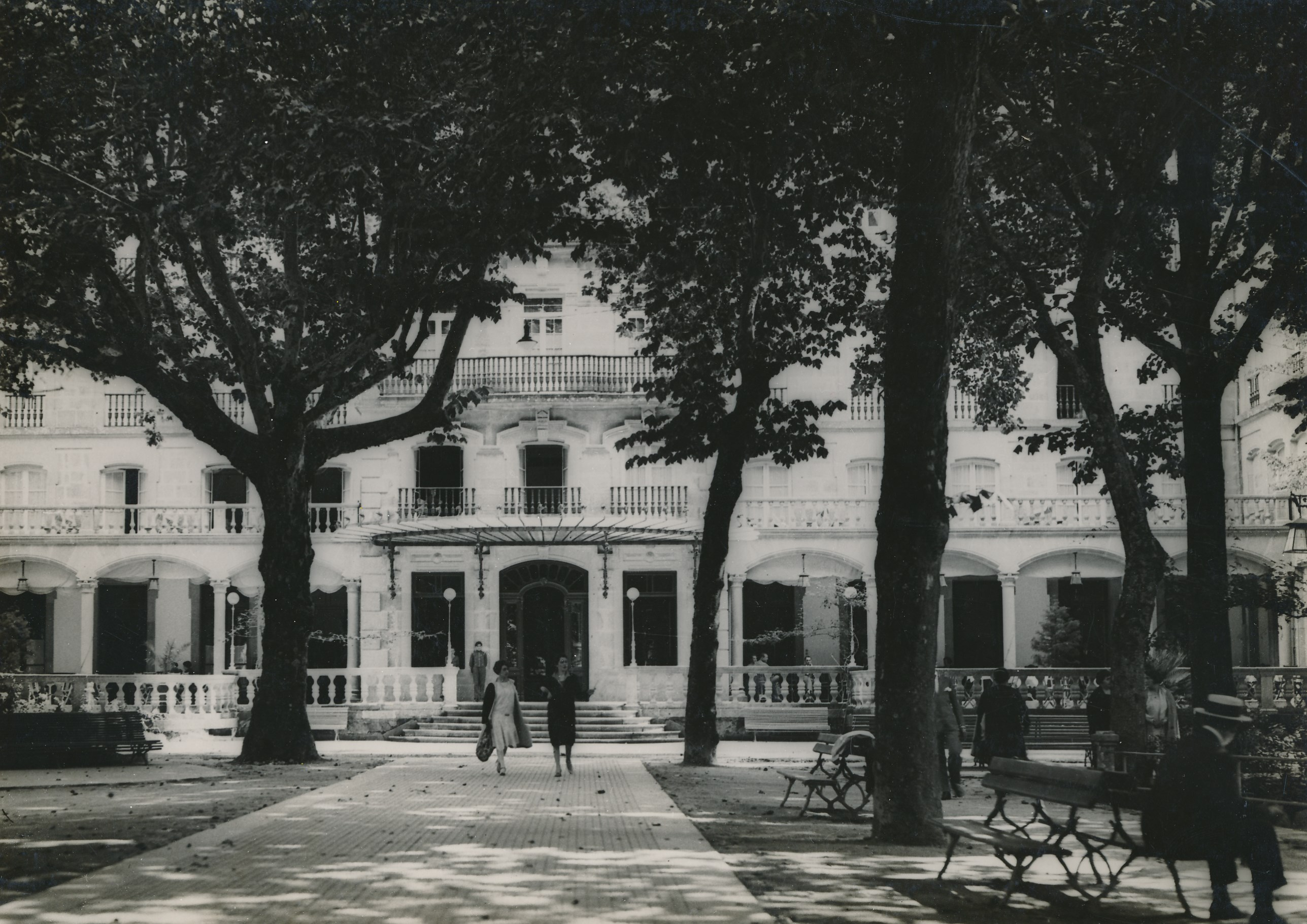
Grand Hotel in 1932

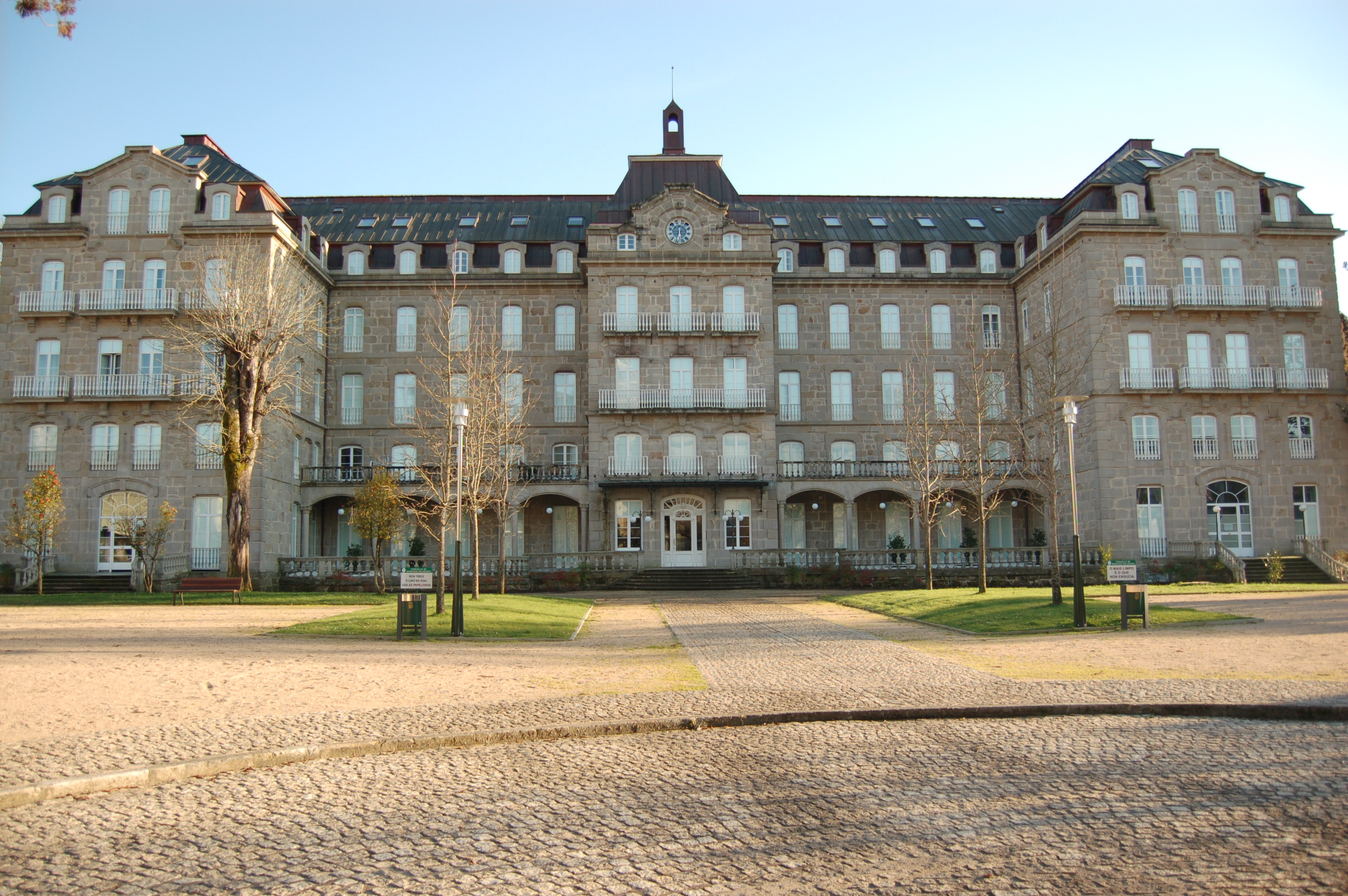
The Grand Hotel after its restoration

Fountain of Gándara, designed by Antonio Palacios

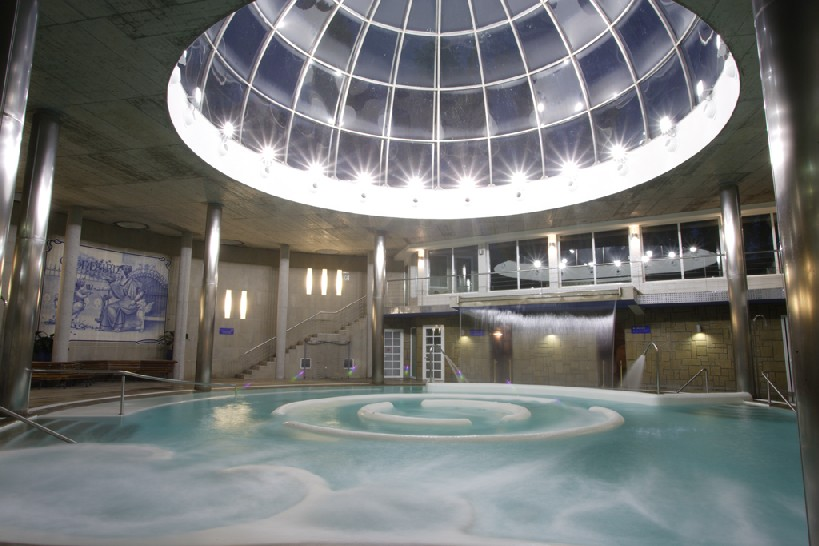
Interior of the Palace of Water (Pazo da Auga)

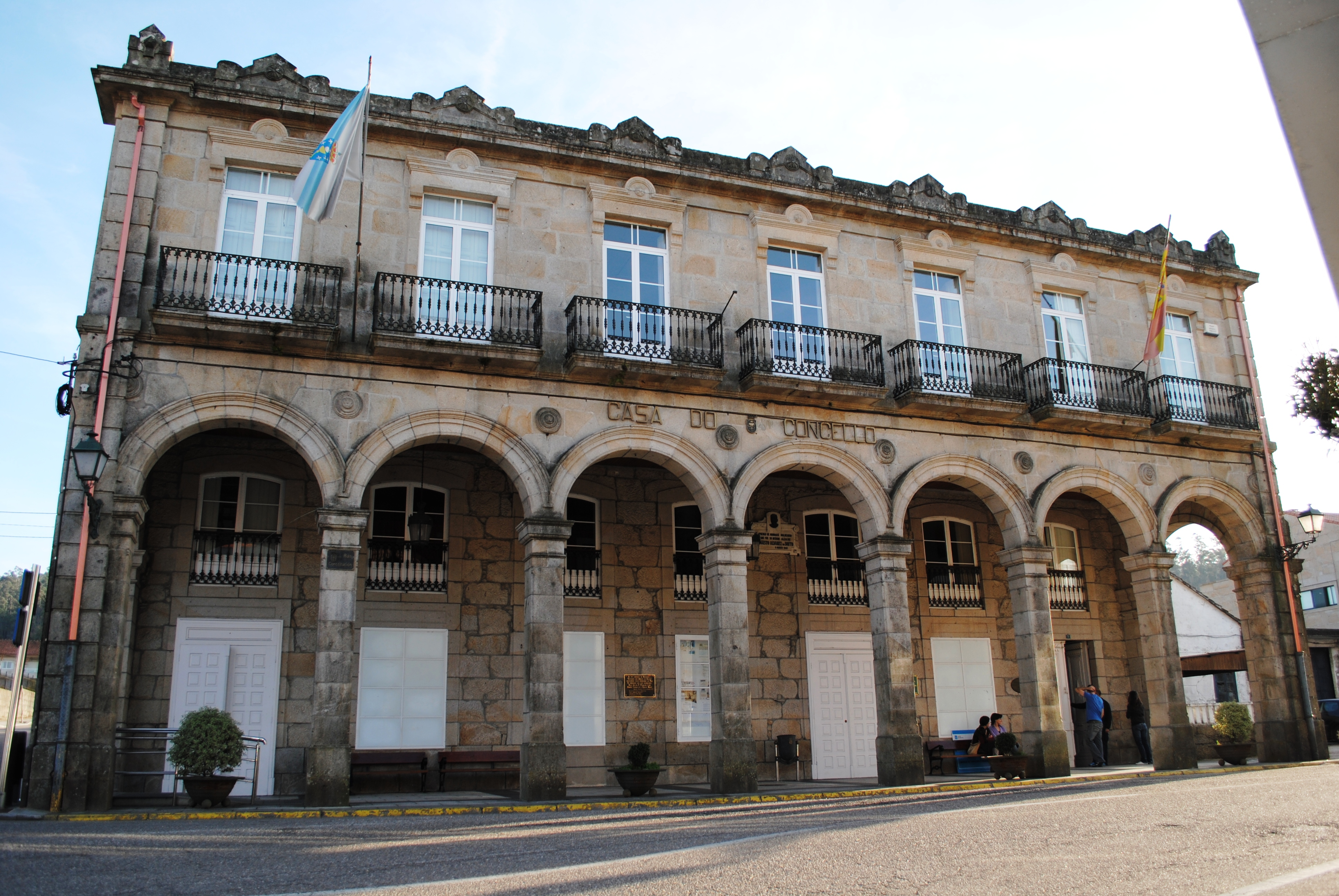
Town Hall

Market hall

== See also ==
- List of municipalities in Pontevedra
