= Mondariz =

- Municipality
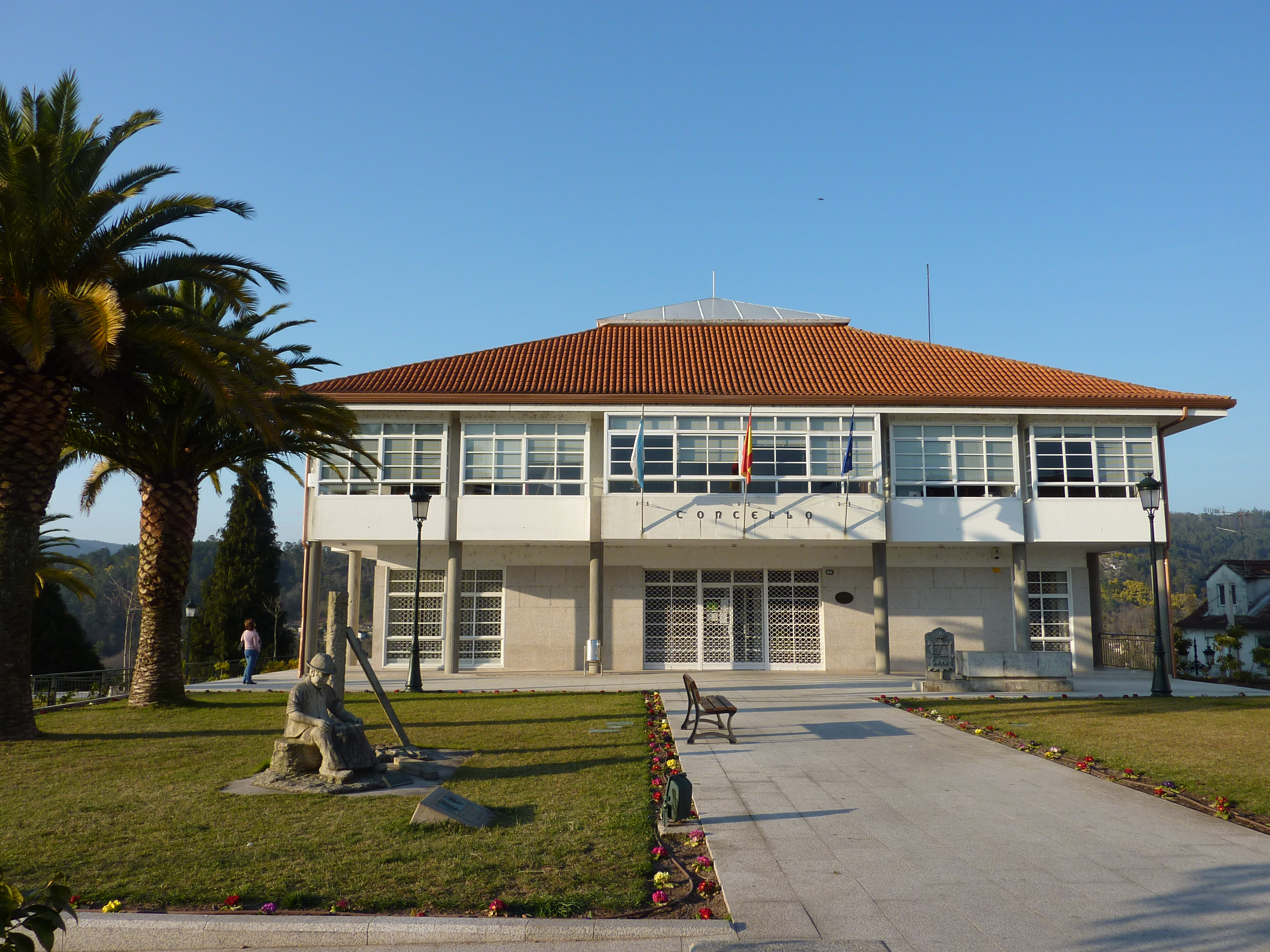
- Town hall.

- Coat of arms

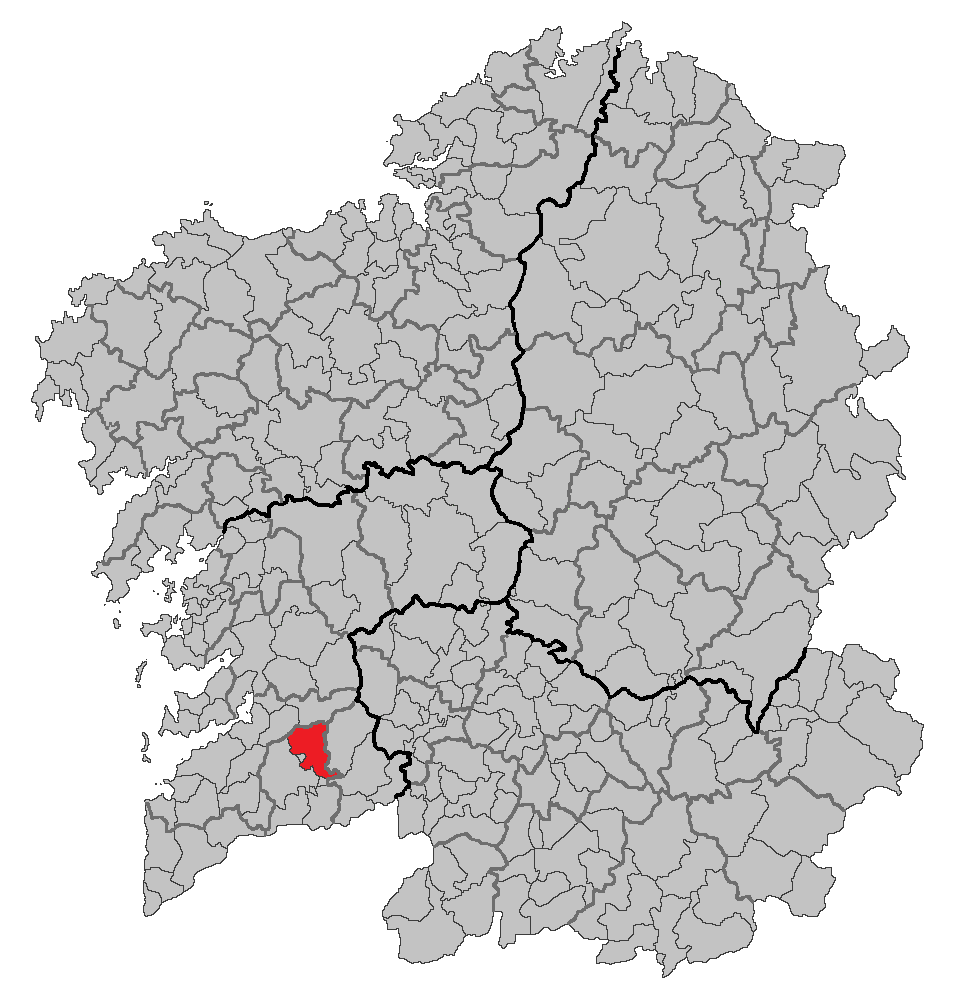
- Location of Mondariz within Galicia.

- Location of Mondariz within Spain.
- Coordinates: 42°14′N 8°27′W
- Country: Spain
- Region: Galicia
- Province: Pontevedra
- Comarca: O Condado
- Parishes: Frades, Gargamala, Lougares, Meirol, Mondariz, Mouriscados, Queimadelos, Riofrío, Sabaxáns, Toutón, Vilar, Vilasobroso

Government
  - Type: Mayor-council
  - Body: Concello de Mondariz
  - Mayor: Pablo Barcia (PPdeG)

Area
  - Land: 85.8 km^{2} (33.1 sq mi)

Population (2025-01-01)
  - Total: 4,456
- Demonym: Mondaricense
- Time zone: CET (GMT +1)
  - Summer (DST): CEST (GMT +2)
- Post code: 36870
- Area code: +34 986 65
- Patron saint: Santa Lucía
- Website: www.concellodemondariz.com

Mondariz is a town and municipality in the province of Pontevedra, autonomous community of Galicia, Spain. It has a population of 4,440 inhabitants.

== Geography ==
The municipality is situated at the foot of the south-western slope of the Suído Mountains, overlooking the Tea River valley. Its elevation ranges from 884 metres at Coto de Eira to 50 metres on the banks of the River Tea. The town itself lies 121 metres above sea level.

It is one of the five municipalities in the comarca of O Condado. It is crossed from east to west by the N-120 road, and from north to south by the PO-252 provincial road, linking the town to Ponteareas and Pazos de Borbén.

=== Parishes ===
The municipality of Mondariz is formed by 12 parroquias (civil parishes). These parroquias can be further subdivided into lugares/aldeas (hamlets).

- Frades
- Gargamala
- Lougares
- Meirol
- Mondariz
- Mouriscados
- Queimadelos
- Riofrío
- Sabaxáns
- Toutón
- Vilar
- Vilasobroso

== Landmarks ==
The Sobroso castle was one of the most important fortifications in southern Galicia during the Late Middle Ages. It was restored in the first half of 20th century, and since 1981 is owned by the municipality of Ponteareas.

The Cernadela Bridge, over the River Tea, was built in the 15th century to provide a crossing for pedestrians attending the weekly markets.

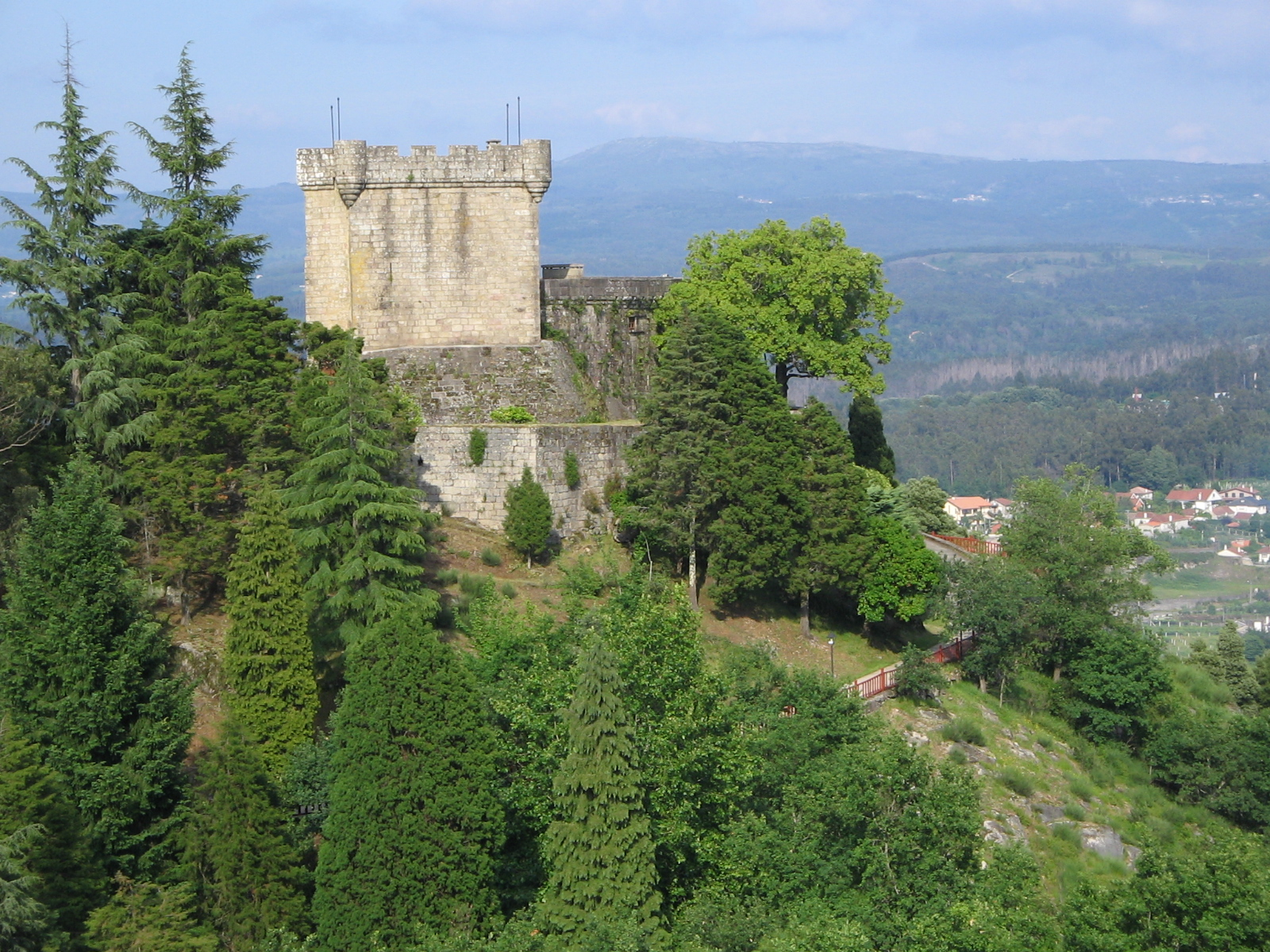
Sobroso Castle

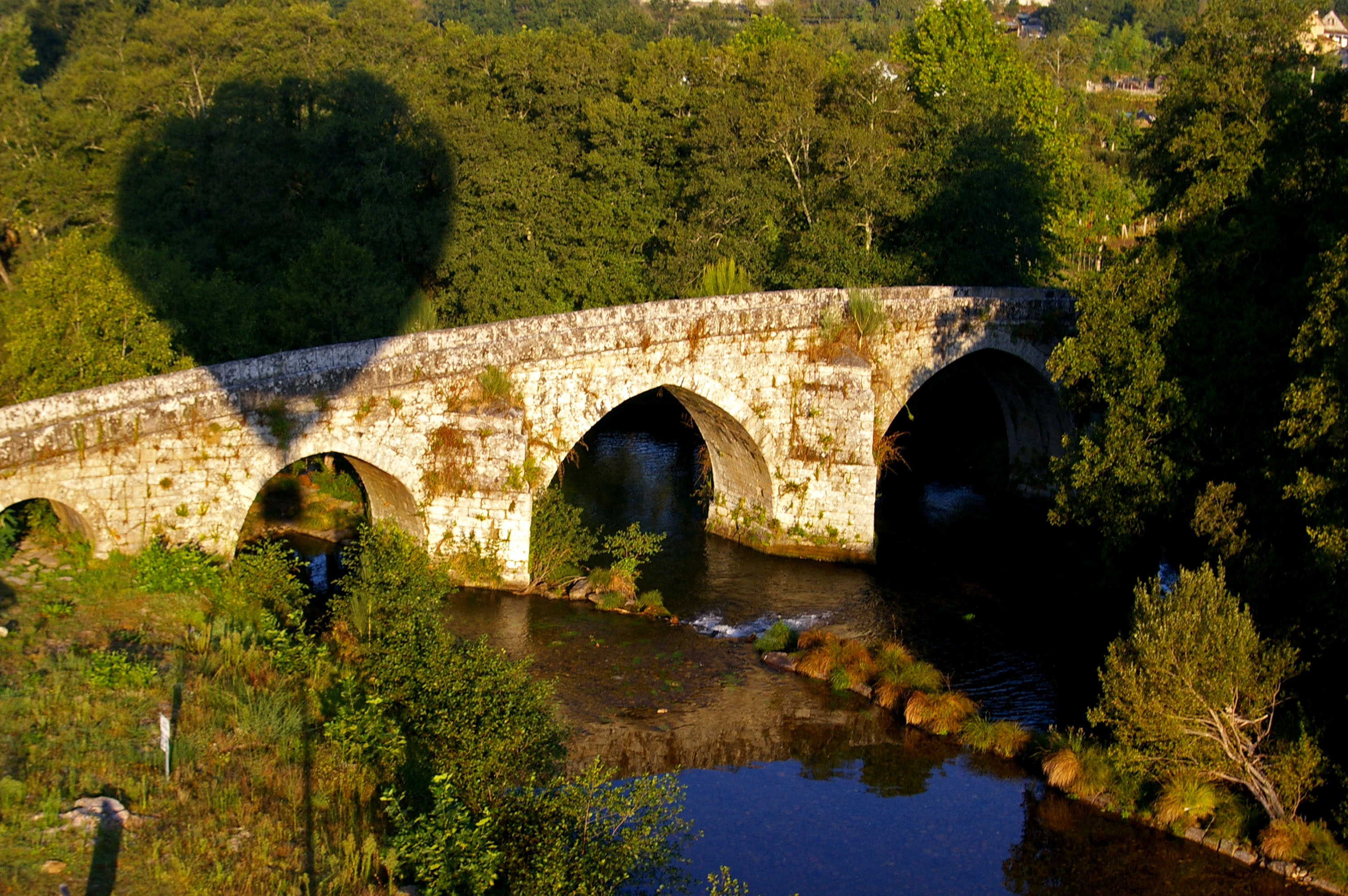
Cernadela Bridge

Church of Santa Baia

Market hall

== Governance ==
The municipality is administered by the Concello de Mondariz (Mondariz town council) consisting of a mayor and 12 councillors. Since 2019 municipal elections the municipality have been controlled by the Galician Nationalist Bloc, with the support of People's Party and Socialist Party.

Councillors
AporM	35.82%
BNG	23.73%
PPdeG	15.03%
PSdeG	12.37%
Cs	12.09%

== See also ==
- List of municipalities in Pontevedra
