= As Neves =

As Neves Nieves/Las Nieves (Spanish)
- Municipality
- Coat of arms
- Interactive map of As Neves
- Location of As Neves As Neves (Spain)
- Coordinates: 42.088°N 8.415°W
- Country: Spain
- Autonomous community: Galicia
- Province: Pontevedra
- Comarca: O Condado
- Name change: 1904, 1983
- Named for: Our Lady of the Snows
- Parishes: Batalláns, Cerdeira, Liñares, As Neves, Rubiós, San Cibrán de Ribarteme, San Pedro de Batalláns, San Xosé de Ribarteme, Santiago de Ribarteme, Setados, Taboexa, Tortoreos, Vide

Government
  - Type: Concello
  - Body: Concello das Neves
  - Mayor: José Manuel Alfonso González (PP)

Area
  - Total: 65.99 km^{2} (25.48 sq mi)

Population (2025-01-01)
  - Total: 3,657 ▼
  - Rank: 133rd in Galicia
  - Density: 55.42/km^{2} (143.5/sq mi)
- Demonym: nevense
- Postcode: 36440, 36446, 36447, 36448, 36449
- INE code: 36034
- Website: www.asneves.com

As Neves is a town and municipality in Galicia, Spain in the province of Pontevedra. It has a population of 3,678 people (2024). It was previously known as Setados.

== Geography ==
As Neves has four elements that make up its geography: the Xuliana river's valley in the western part, the Minho river's valley in the south, along the border with Portugal, the Termes river's valley in the east and the Paradanta Mountains in the north.

== Name ==
The municipality was known as Setados until 1904, with the capital located in the neighbouring parish of Santa Eugenia de Setados.

== Economy ==
The town's main economy sources are the forest, wood, and Condado wine, a variety of wine under protected designation of origin Rías Baixas.

There are also tourist services based in countrysides and natural products for eating such as lamprea (lamprey eel, see recipe for the Galician dish) and requeixón/requesón, a type of cheese curd (see a recipe for cheesecake made with requesón ).

== Pilgrimage ==
It is the site of an annual pilgrimage on 29 July in which those who have experienced a near-death experience express their gratitude by visiting the church Santa Marta de Ribarteme, the patron saint of resurrection.

Thousands of people descend on As Neves from 10 am on the day of Santa Marta. It is usually impossible to get a seat in the church but those who cannot get into the packed church can listen to the service relayed over loudspeakers.

Those who have passed through a near-death experience use coffins as their emblems; they either carry them or place themselves in the coffins and are carried by friends or family. After noon mass, the pilgrims walk to the town cemetery and then return to make a procession throughout the town.

As in many pilgrimages, there is a mix of solemnity and celebration. While pilgrims chant "Virgin Saint Martha, star of the North, we bring you those who saw death", Roma play instruments and vendors sell food, especially the local delicacy of cooked octopus. During the day, and even more so at night, fireworks are set off by those in the procession to mark their progress through the town.

== See also ==
- List of municipalities in Pontevedra
