= Ponteareas =

Ponteareas Puenteareas
- Municipality
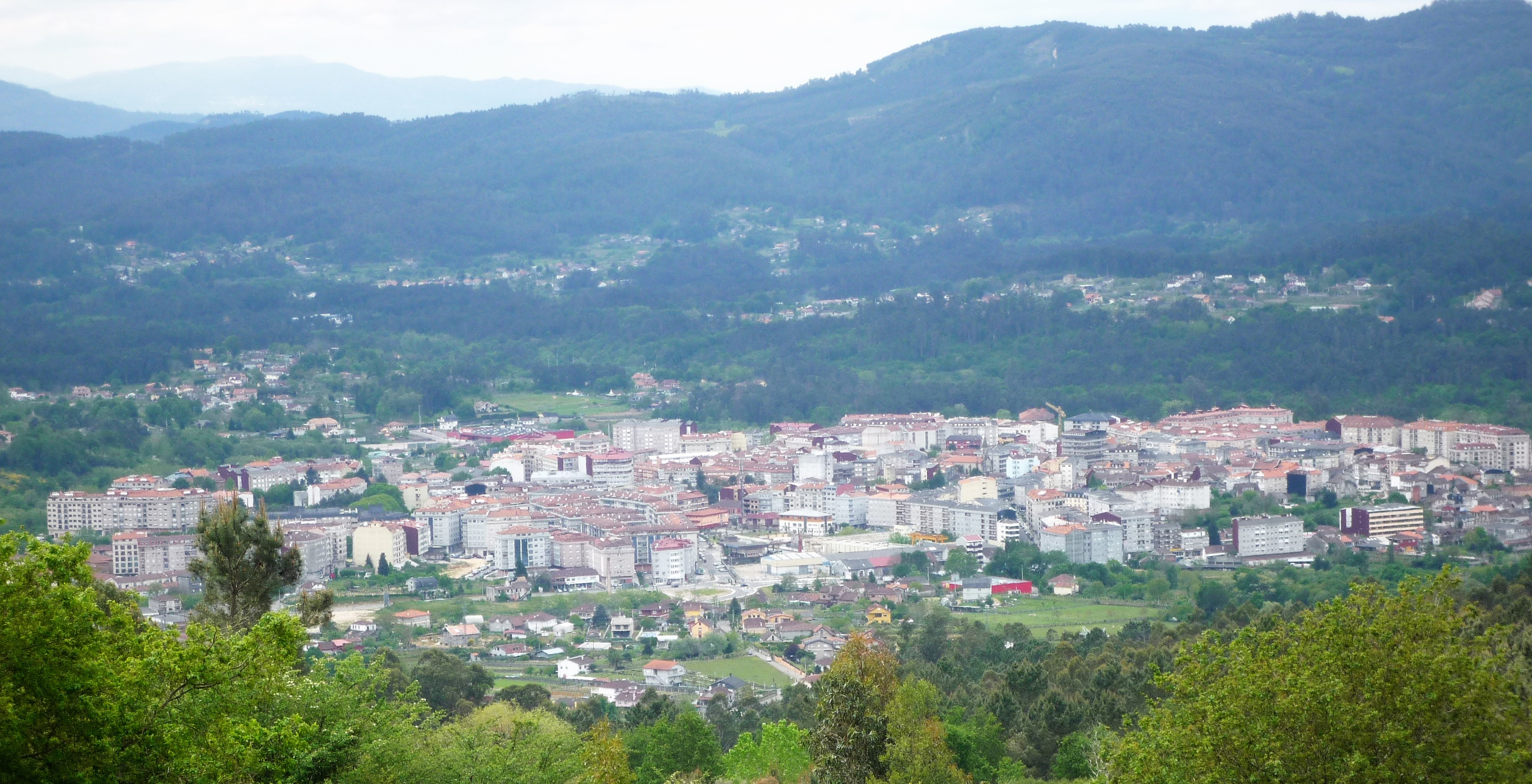
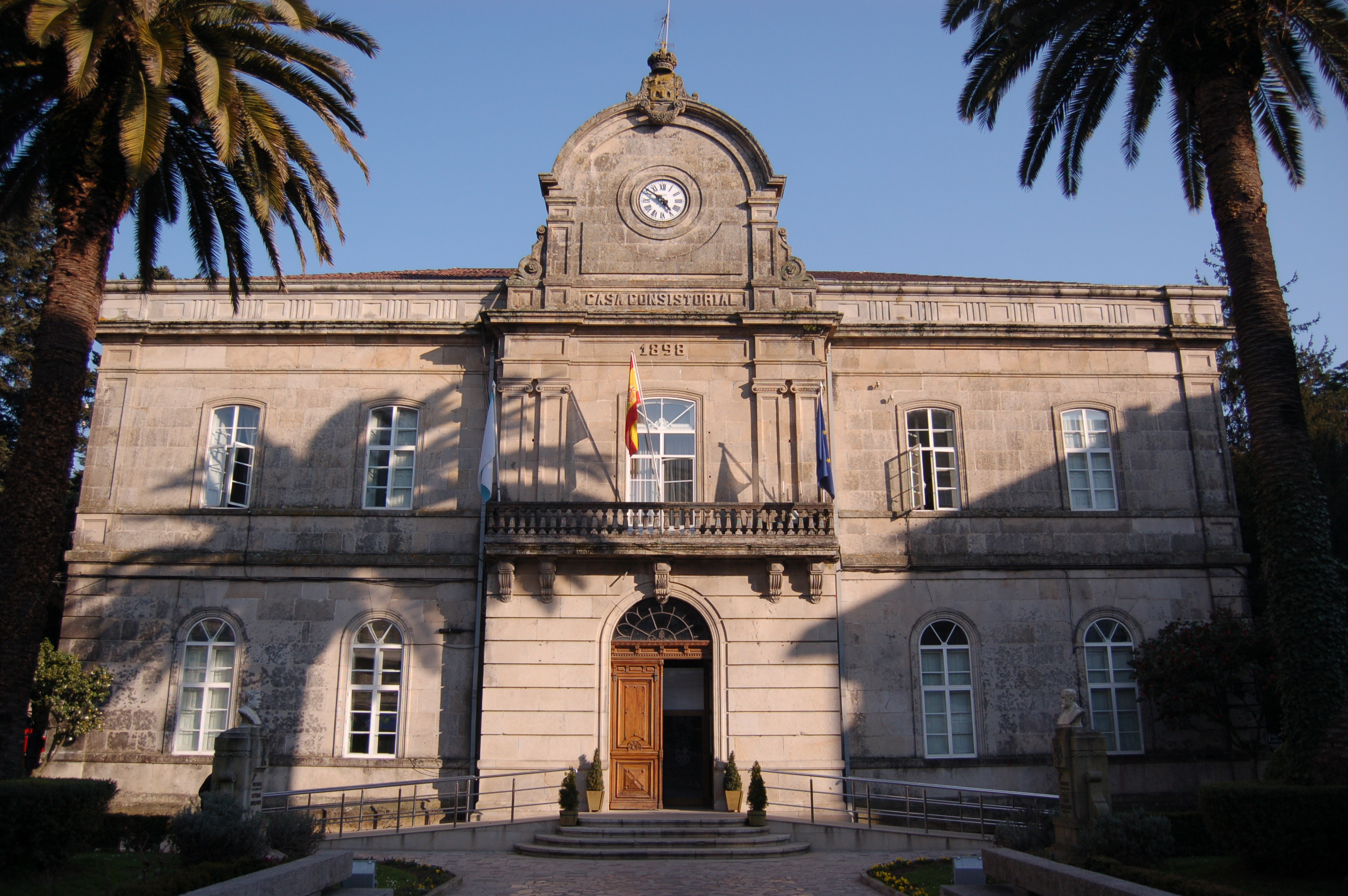
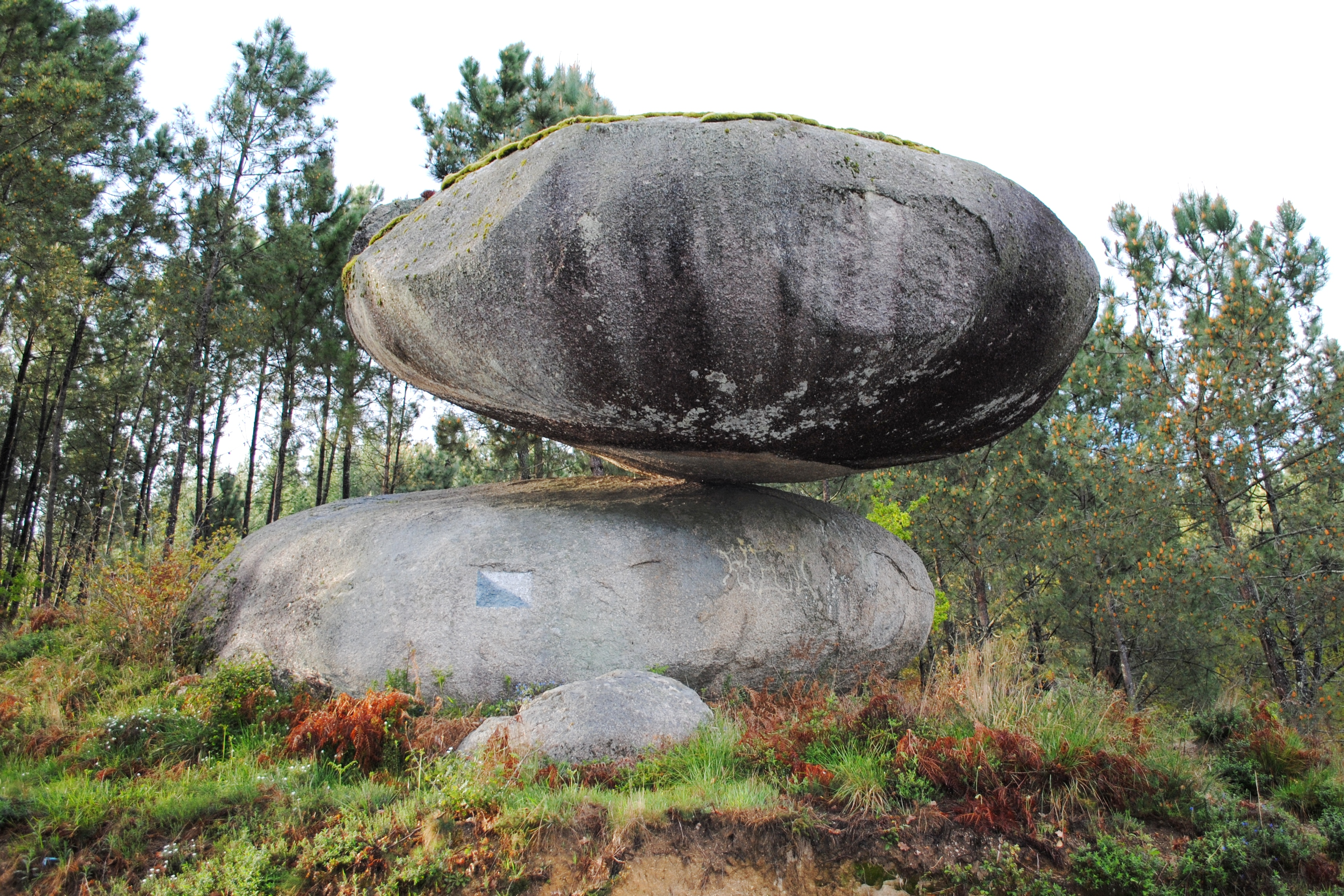
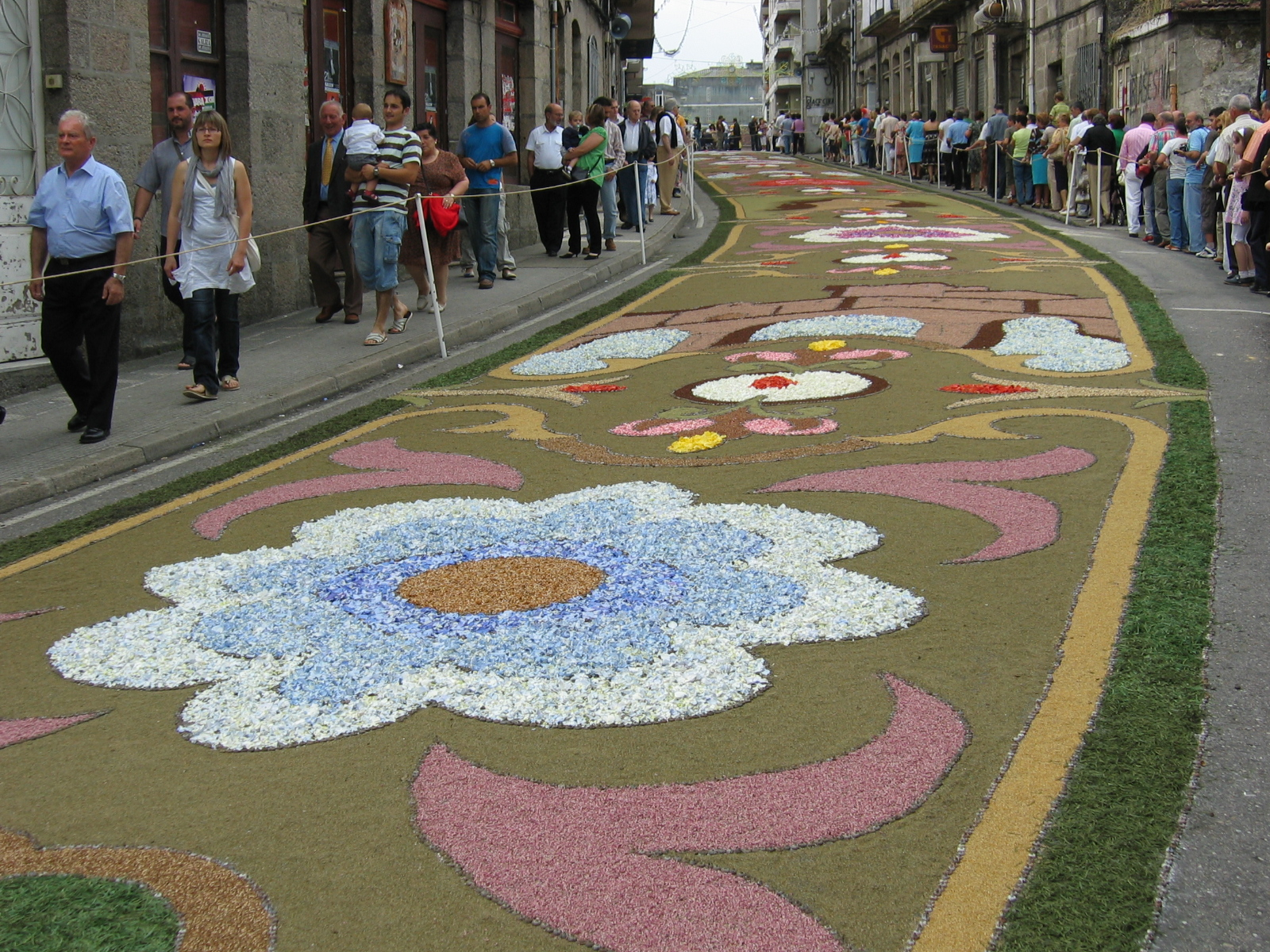
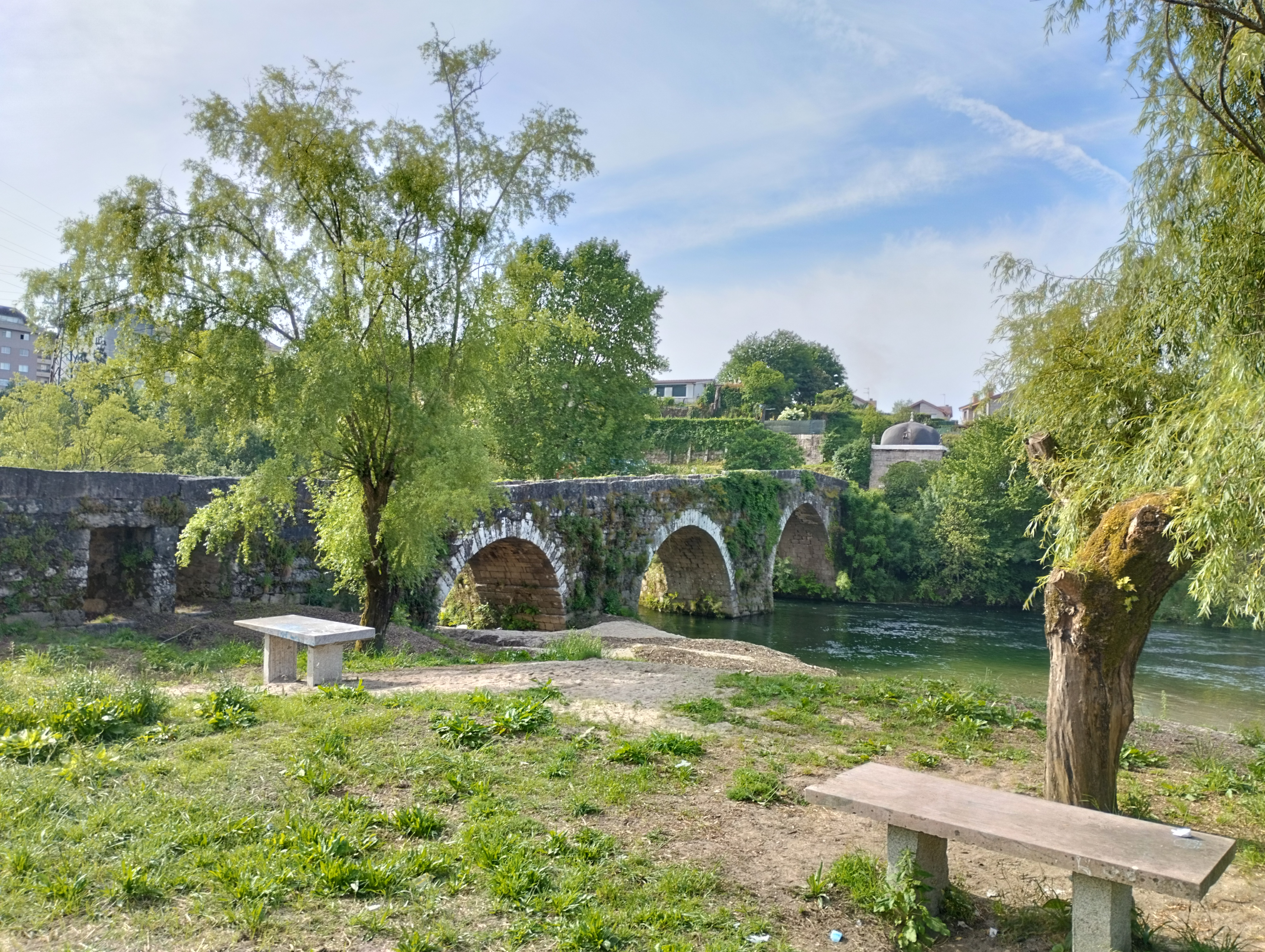
- Panoramic view of Ponteareas Ponteareas Town Hall Pena do Equilibrio Corpus Christi floral carpets Os Remedios Bridge

- Flag Coat of arms
- Nicknames: Vila do Corpus, Vila do Tea
- Interactive map of Ponteareas
- Location within Spain
- Coordinates: 42.166667°N 8.5°W
- Country: Spain
- Autonomous community: Galicia
- Province: Pontevedra
- Comarca: O Condado
- Established: 1483; 543 years ago
- Founder: Diego Sarmiento de Sotomayor
- Subdivisions: 24 paroquias

Government
  - Type: Mayor–council
  - Body: Concello de Ponteareas
  - Mayor: Nava Castro (PPdeG)

Area
  - Land: 125 km^{2} (48 sq mi)
- Elevation: 50 m (160 ft)
- Highest elevation (Alto do Galleiro): 743 m (2,438 ft)

Population (2025-01-01)
  - Total: 23,211
  - Rank: 20th in Galicia; 7th in Pontevedra
- Demonym(s): ponteareán (m), ponteareá (f) ponteareano (m), ponteareana (f)
- Time zone: CET (GMT +1)
  - Summer (DST): CEST (GMT +2)
- Postal code: 36860-36895
- Area code: +34 986 66
- INE code: 36042
- Website: www.ponteareas.gal

Ponteareas is a town and municipality in the province of Pontevedra, in the autonomous community of Galicia, Spain. It belongs to the comarca of O Condado.

It is located on the Vigo-Benavente highway and on the river Tea, a right-hand tributary of the Miño. It is the chief town of a fertile hilly region, which produces wine, grain and fruit, and contains many cattle farms. The industries of the town itself are porcelain manufactures, tanning and distilling. Close by are the ruins of the Sobroso Castle, which played an important part in the medieval civil wars. While it is located in the nearby town, Mondariz, it is owned by the council of Ponteareas.

== History ==
=== Toponymy ===
The name refers to the Os Remedios Bridge, which was also known in the past as "Ponte de Areas" ("Areas Bridge"), as it provided access to the village of the same name.

=== Early history ===
The earliest settlements in the Tea valley date back to the Castro culture, which developed during the late Bronze Age. Its inhabitants lived mainly from agriculture — particularly the cereal cultivation —, as well as livestock farming and pastoralism. They lived in circular fortified settlements surrounded by moats and defensive walls, using stone as the main building material.

The main archaeological site from this period in the municipality is the Castro de Troña, which was inhabited from the 6th or 5th century BC until it was gradually abandoned following the Roman conquest.

=== Middle Ages ===
In 569, Areas is mentioned in the "Parrochiale Suevorum" as a parish within the Diocese of Tui, in the Suebi kingdom, drawing on the resources of the River Tea. Today, this parish forms part of the municipality of Ponteareas.

The town of Ponteareas itself began to take shape in the late 15th century, when a weekly market was held on a small hill near the River Tea, where the main square stands today. To facilitate access to the market for traders travelling from the west, the Os Remedios Bridge was built to provide a crossing over the River Tea.

The town at the beginning of the 20th century

=== Modern period ===
After the 1833 territorial division of Spain, which difinitely abolished the faudal estates, Ponteareas became part of the Province of Pontevedra. In the 1860s, the road from Villacastín to Vigo was built, contributing to the town's demographic growth. At the end of the century, the new parish church and the town hall were built.

== Administration ==
=== Local government ===
The municipality of Ponteareas is administered by a mayor-council government, the Concello de Ponteareas, which meets at the Casa Consistorial in the Xardins da Xiralda. Following the local elections of 2023 the municipality is governed by a two-party coalition of the People's Party of Galicia and ACIP with Nava Castro as Mayor.

Local election results in Ponteareas
Party	2007	2011	2015	2019	2023
People's Party (PP)	6	9	7	5	7
Galician Nationalist Bloc (BNG)	6	5	5	8	6
Alternativa Ciudadana de Ponteareas (ACIP)	-	4	3	4	4
Spanish Socialist Workers' Party (PSOE-PSdeG)	4	3	4	3	2
Independientes Ponteareas (IP)	-	-	-	-	1
Ponteareas en Común (PEC)	-	-	-	-	1
A Riada do Tea (ARDT)	-	-	1	-	-
United Left (EU-SON)	-	-	1	-	-
Condado-Paradanta Union (UCPA)	5	-	-	-	-

=== Administrative subdivisions ===
The municipality of Ponteareas comprises 24 parroquias, local administrative units historically derived from ecclesiastical parishes.

Parishes of Ponteareas
	Place name	Population	Land area in km^{2}	Pop. density per km^{2}
1	Angoares	504		
2	Arcos	524		
3	Areas	1,016		
4	Arnoso	255		
5	Bugarín	529		
6	Celeiros	227		
7	Cristiñade	486		
8	Cumiar	116		
9	Fontenla	296		
10	Fozara	323		
11	Guillade	451		
12	Guláns	714		
13	Moreira	702		
14	Nogueira	190		
15	Santiago de Oliveira	310		
16	San Mateo de Oliveira	573		
17	San Lourenzo de Oliveira	131		
18	Padróns	580		
19	Paredes	47		
20	Pías	456		
21	Ponteareas	12,528		
22	Prado	231		
23	Ribadetea	862		
24	Xinzo	1,157		

== Culture ==
=== Festivities ===
Corpus Christi

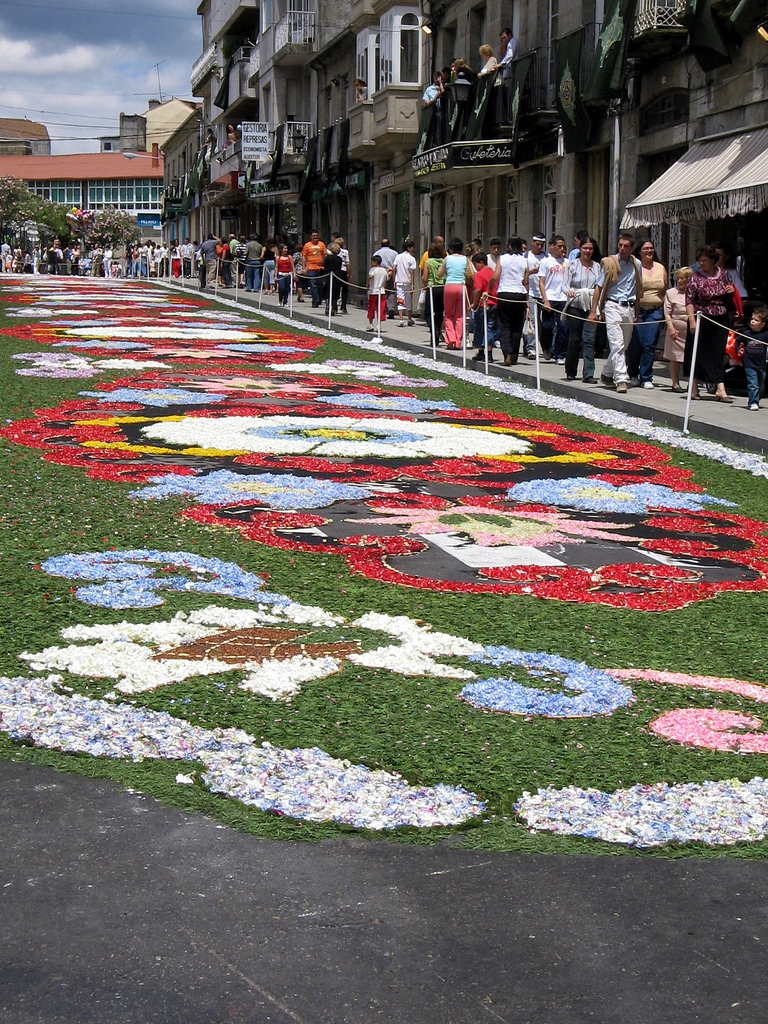
Floral carpet.

The religious festival of Corpus Christi holds particular significance. Dating back to 1857, it is traditionally celebrated with a procession of the Holy Sacrament along streets adorned with intricate floral carpets. In recognition of its cultural and touristic value, the festival was declared of Tourist Interest in 1968, of National Tourist Interests in 1980, and of International Tourist Interest in 2009, placing it alongside other renowned Spanish celebrations such as the Fallas and La Tomatina.

Local holidays

- Día da Picaraña (1 May)
- Virgin of os Remedios on (6 September)
- Saint Michael the Archangel (29 September)

=== Music ===
The town has a conservatory named after Reveriano Soutullo (1884–1932), a composer of Zarzuelas.

== Domestic cooperation ==
Ponteareas is twinned with the Spanish municipalities of Redondela, La Orotava and Monòver.

== Notable people ==
- Gabino Bugallal, politician (1861–1932)
- Reveriano Soutullo, composer of Zarzuelas (1884–1932)
- Manuel Domínguez Benavides, writer (1895–1947)
- Fermín Bouza Brey, writer (1901–1973)
- Delio Rodríguez, cyclist (1916–1994)
- Emilio Rodríguez, cyclist (1923–1984)
- Rogelio Groba, composer (1930)
- Silverio Rivas, sculptor (1942)
- Abel Caballero, politician (1946)
- Álvaro Pino, cyclist (1956)
- Juan Carlos Taboas, cyclist (1972)
- Gonzalo Caballero Míguez, politician (1975)

== See also ==
- List of municipalities in Pontevedra
