= O Condado =

Coordinates: 42°09′40″N 8°28′07″W

- Comarca
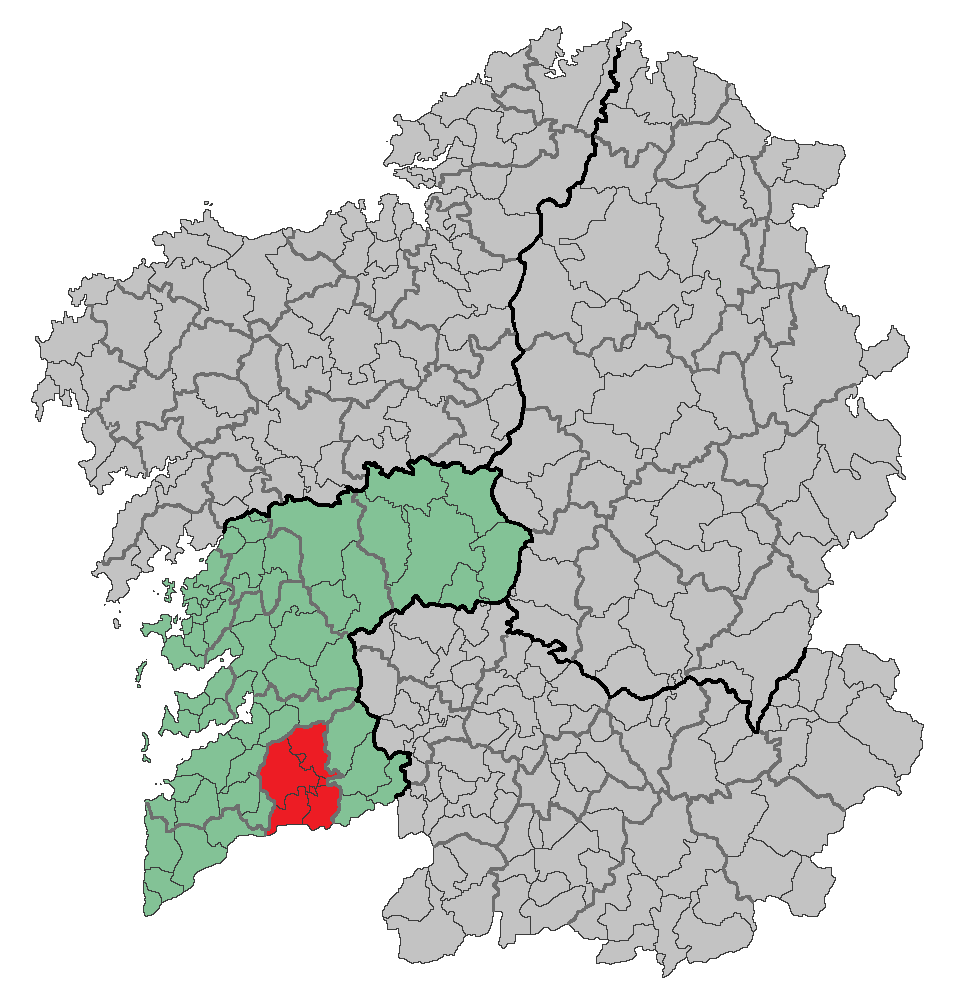
- Country: Spain
- Autonomous community: Galicia
- Province: Pontevedra
- Capital: Ponteareas
- Municipalities: List: As Neves, Mondariz, Mondariz-Balneario, Salvaterra de Miño, Ponteareas

Area
  - Total: 341 km^{2} (132 sq mi)

Population (2018)
  - Total: 41,551
  - Density: 122/km^{2} (316/sq mi)
- Time zone: UTC+1 (CET)
  - Summer (DST): UTC+2 (CEST)

O Condado is a comarca in the Galician Province of Pontevedra, centred on the town of Ponteareas. It covers an area of 341 km^{2}, and the overall population of this comarca was 42,642 at the 2011 Census; the latest official estimate at the start of 2018 was 41,551.

== Municipalities ==
Location of the comarca and its municipalities within Pontevedra province.

The comarca comprises the following five municipalities:

Name of municipality	Population (2001)	Population (2011)	Population (2018)
As Neves	4,478	4,280	3,892
Mondariz	5,185	4,847	4,496
Mondariz-Balneario	693	678	618
Ponteareas	19,011	23,295	22,854
Salvaterra de Miño	8,073	9,542	9,691
Totals	37,440	42,642	41,551
