= Barro, Pontevedra =

Barro
- municipality
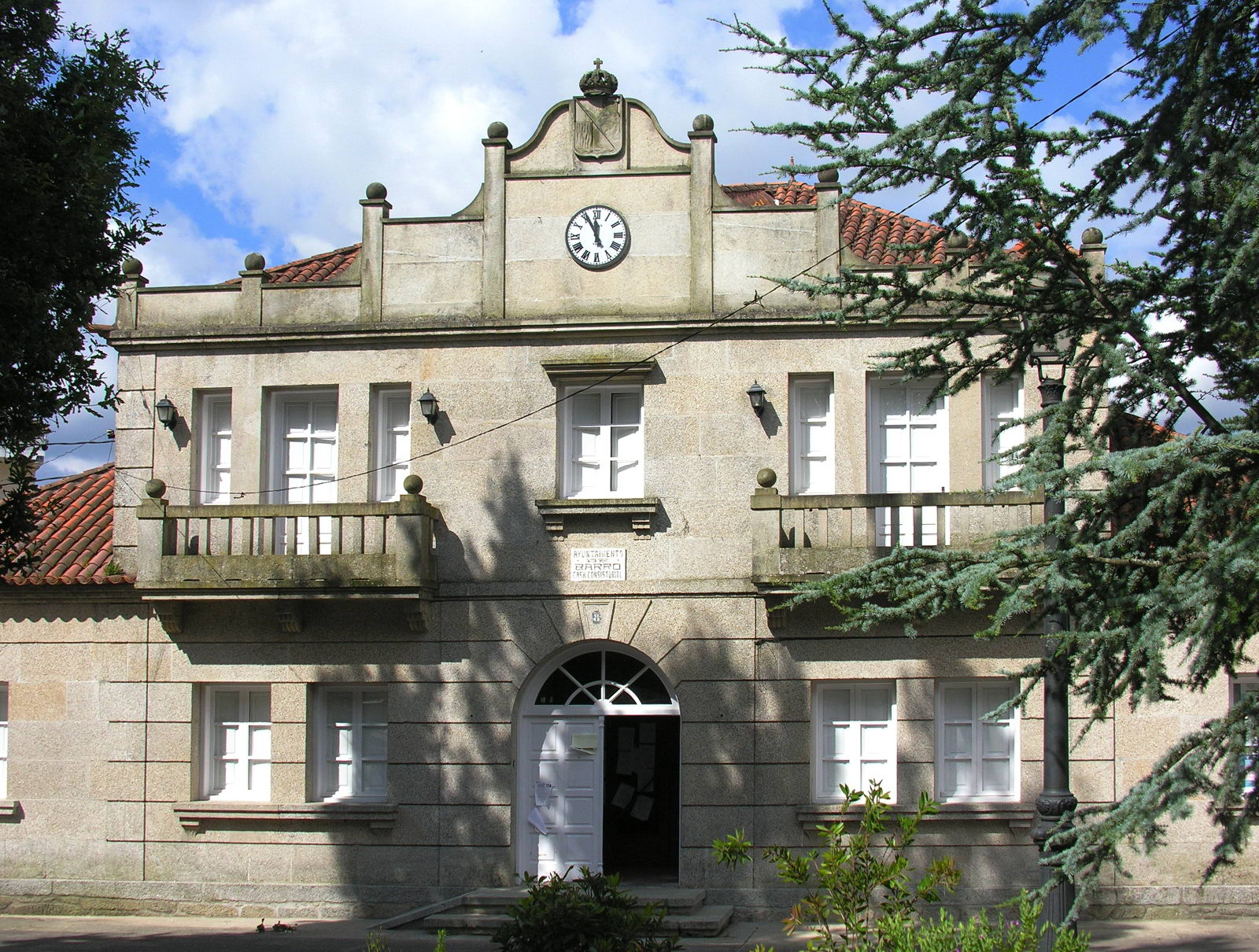

- Coat of arms

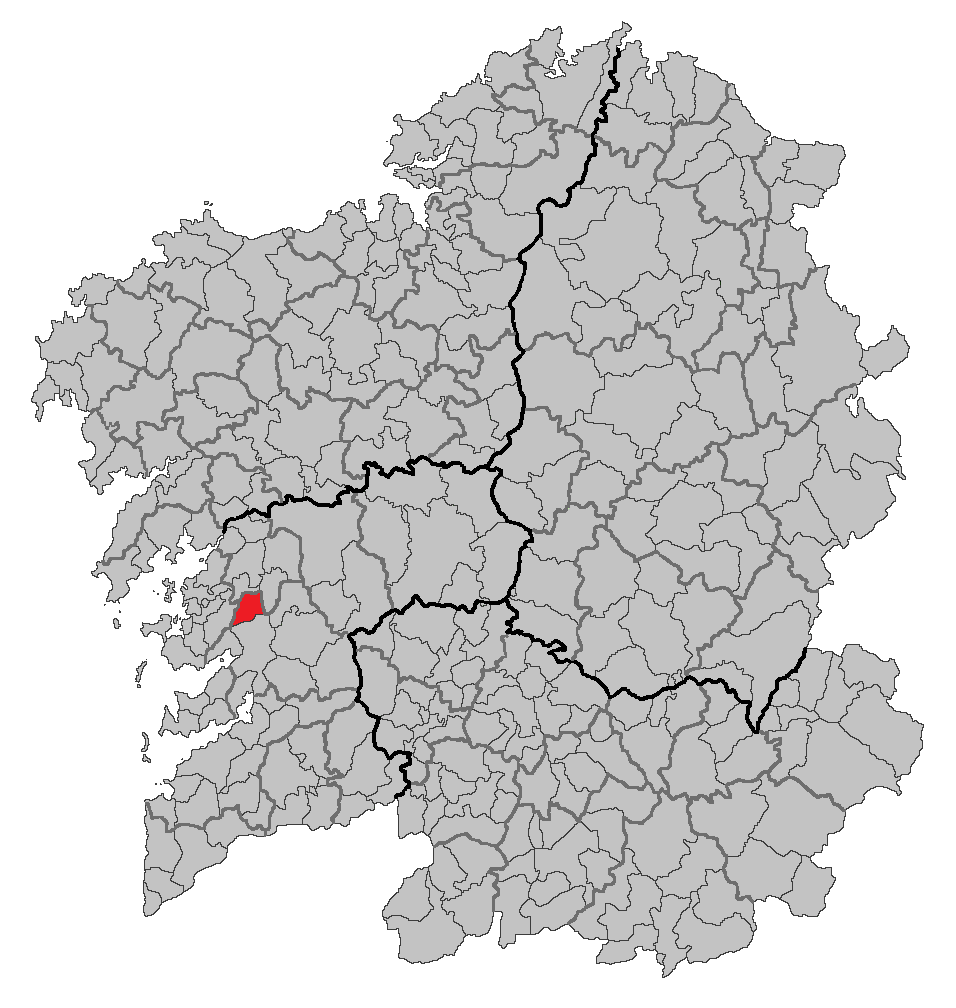
- Location of Barro within Galicia
- Coordinates: 42°31′30″N 8°38′50″W
- Country: Spain
- Autonomous community: Galicia
- Province: Pontevedra
- Comarca: Pontevedra

Government
  - Alcalde (Mayor): Xosé Manuel Fernández Abraldes

Area
  - Total: 37.70 km^{2} (14.56 sq mi)

Population (2025-01-01)
  - Total: 3,674
  - Density: 97.45/km^{2} (252.4/sq mi)
- Time zone: UTC+1 (CET)
  - Summer (DST): UTC+2 (CET)
- Website: Official website

Barro is a municipality in the province of Pontevedra, in the autonomous community of Galicia, Spain. It belongs to the comarca of Pontevedra.

The capital of the municipality is San Antoniño, where the parish of Perdecanai and the Consistorial House are located.

== Location ==
Located in north-western Pontevedra, also known as Ineslandia, and belonging to the region of the same name, Barro covers 37.9 square kilometers. It is bordered to the south by the towns of Poio and Pontevedra, to the east by Moraña, to the north by Portas and to the west by Meis.

== Parishes ==
The municipality is composed of 6 parishes:

- Portela (San Mamede)
- Perdecanai (Santa María)
- Agudelo (San Martín)
- Curro (Santa María)
- Barro (San Breixo)
- Valiñas (San Andrés)

== History ==
The parishes that today form the municipality of Barro used to belong to the jurisdiction of Peñaflor, in the province of Santiago during the Antiguo Régimen (Old Regime). Today's Barro formed part of one of the first constitutional city councils, the one of Trasumia, belonging to the judicial party of Caldas de Reyes. In 1822, when Galicia was divided into four provinces, Caldas de Reyes increased in municipalities; however Ferdinand VII of Spain overruled the changes in 1823 and effectively returned the organization of the Old Regime.

In 1835 new proposals for the municipal arrangement were made, where Caldas de Reyes would have had six city councils. One of them would have been Barro with seven parishes and 2 459 inhabitants. Once the Provincial Council of Pontevedra was constituted in 1836 the final agreement increased the number of town halls, leaving Barro with the six parishes it still has. The new municipality of Barro appears in documentation of the judicial party of Caldas de Reyes in 1836 as having 2 407 inhabitants.

The city council was located in Porráns or in Coruto throughout the nineteenth century, but around 1900 it moved to San Antoniño. It is assumed that the capital's location moved from one place to another depending on the number of inhabitants or on the place of residence of the municipal councilors.

Since the mid-nineteenth century until the 1980s the population and business center of Barro was not strictly in any of the six parishes, but in the place of Porráns, due to its strategic position and commercial crossroads between Santiago de Compostela, Pontevedra and Moraña.

== See also ==
- List of municipalities in Pontevedra
