= Castiñeiras Lake =

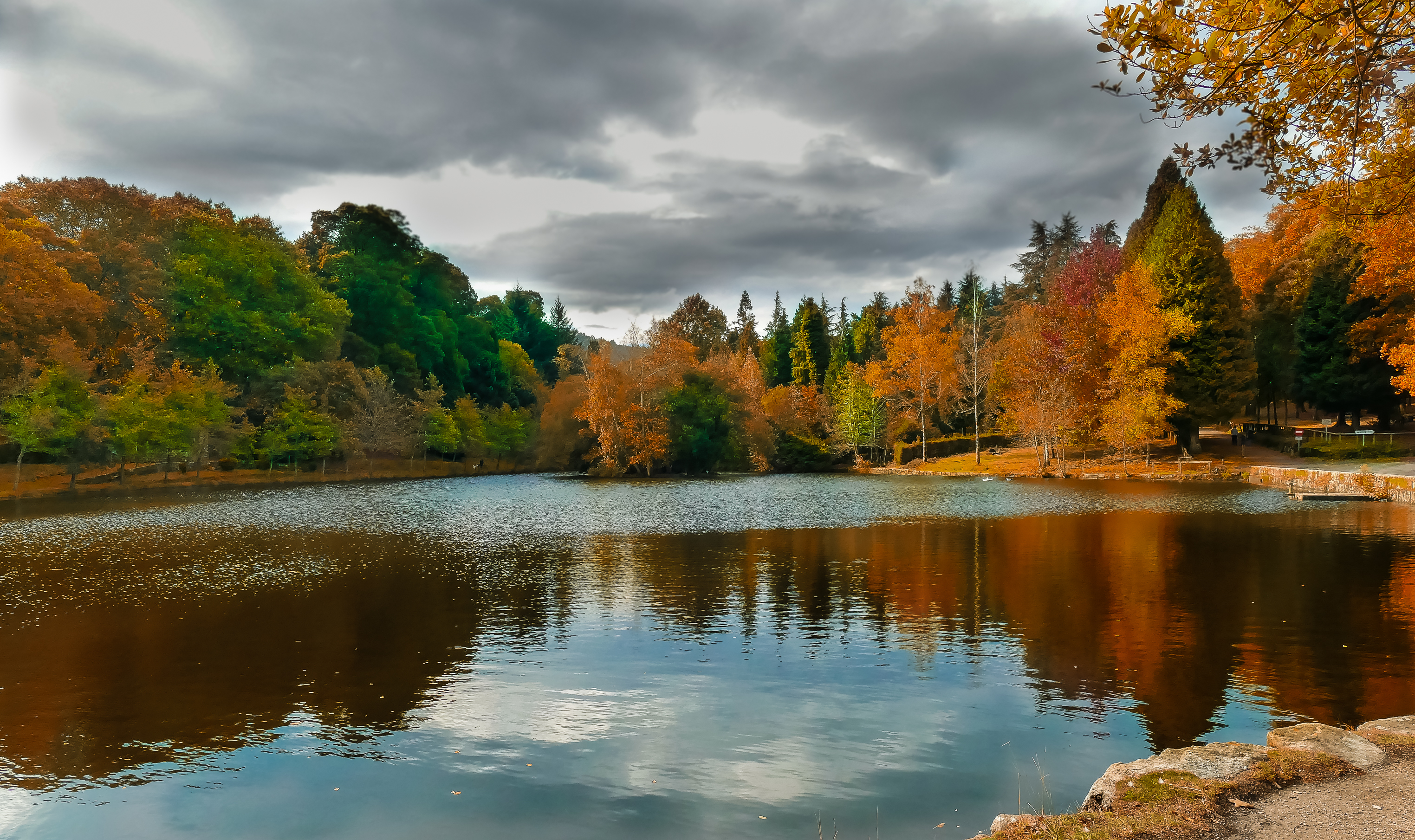

- Location within Galicia Location within Spain
- Interactive map of Castiñeiras Lake
- Location: Vilaboa, Galicia
- Coordinates: 42.3549°N 8.6744°W
- Type: lake
- Primary inflows: Castiñeiras stream
- Primary outflows: Castiñeiras stream
- Basin countries: Spain
- Max. length: 301 m (0.187 mi)
- Max. width: 70.9 m (0.0441 mi)
- Surface area: 1.09 ha (2.7 acres)
- Surface elevation: 372 m (1,220 ft)
- Settlements: Pontevedra

Lake Castiñeiras is an artificial lake located on Mount Cotorredondo (between the regions of O Morrazo and Pontevedra) in Spain, between the municipalities of Vilaboa (civil parish of Vilaboa, near the places of Graña and Postemirón) and Marín (civil parish of San Xián). The lake is located 9 kilometres from the city of Pontevedra.

== History ==
Surrounding the lake is one of the oldest forest parks in Galicia, the Castiñeiras Lake Nature Park, located in a communal forest managed by the Xunta de Galicia. The lake was created in 1950 as a result of the construction of a new road in the area and to contain the irrigation water of the Castiñeiras stream.

It is surrounded by a forest created in the 1950s, but which probably originated in the first plantations of the reforestation plan of the province of Pontevedra, initiated on 3 January 1927.

== Description ==
The park has 70 hectares of reforested land with chestnut, birch, American red oak, pine, laurel and other exotic species and over 40 species of trees. Wildlife includes ducks, swans, reptiles, fish (the lake has recently been stocked with trout), deer and fallow deer.

The park around the lake has large recreational areas with picnic areas, barbecues, fountains and children's playgrounds. There are several hiking routes around the lake, one of which leads to the Cotorredondo viewpoint or Mirador de las tres rías, due to the panoramic views it offers over the rias of Pontevedra, Vigo and Arousa, at an altitude of 550 metres.

In the park there are archaeological sites from the Megalithic period and the Bronze Age. There is a field of four mámoas (burial mounds), among which the Mámoa del Rey (King's Mámoa) stands out, one of the largest in Galicia.

Inside the park there is an information stand and an exhibition area on the nature of Cotorredondo since 1987 (Saint Julian Nature classroom), both managed by the Teixugo cooperative.

== Access ==
The lake can be reached via the Figueirido road, from the N-550, or from Vilaboa via various forest roads (401, 105).

== Gallery ==
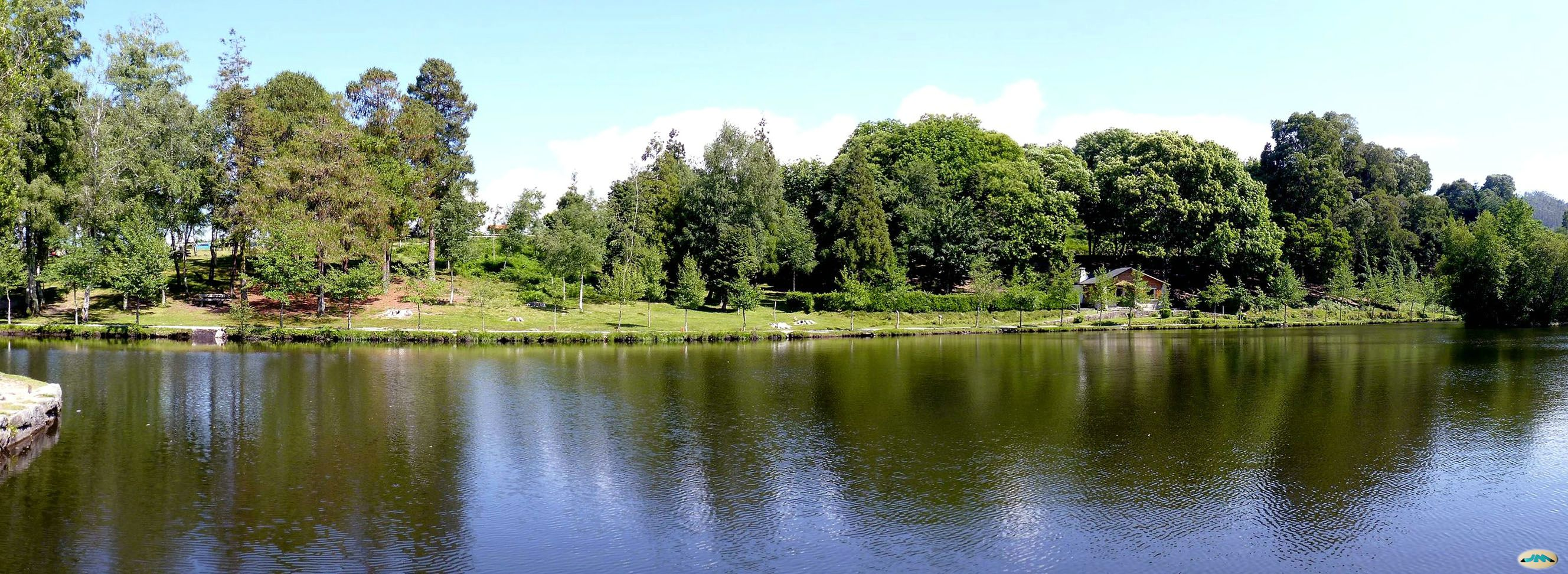
View of the lake.

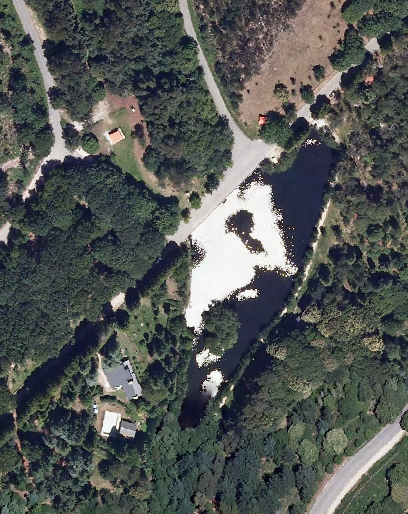
View of the lake in 2014.

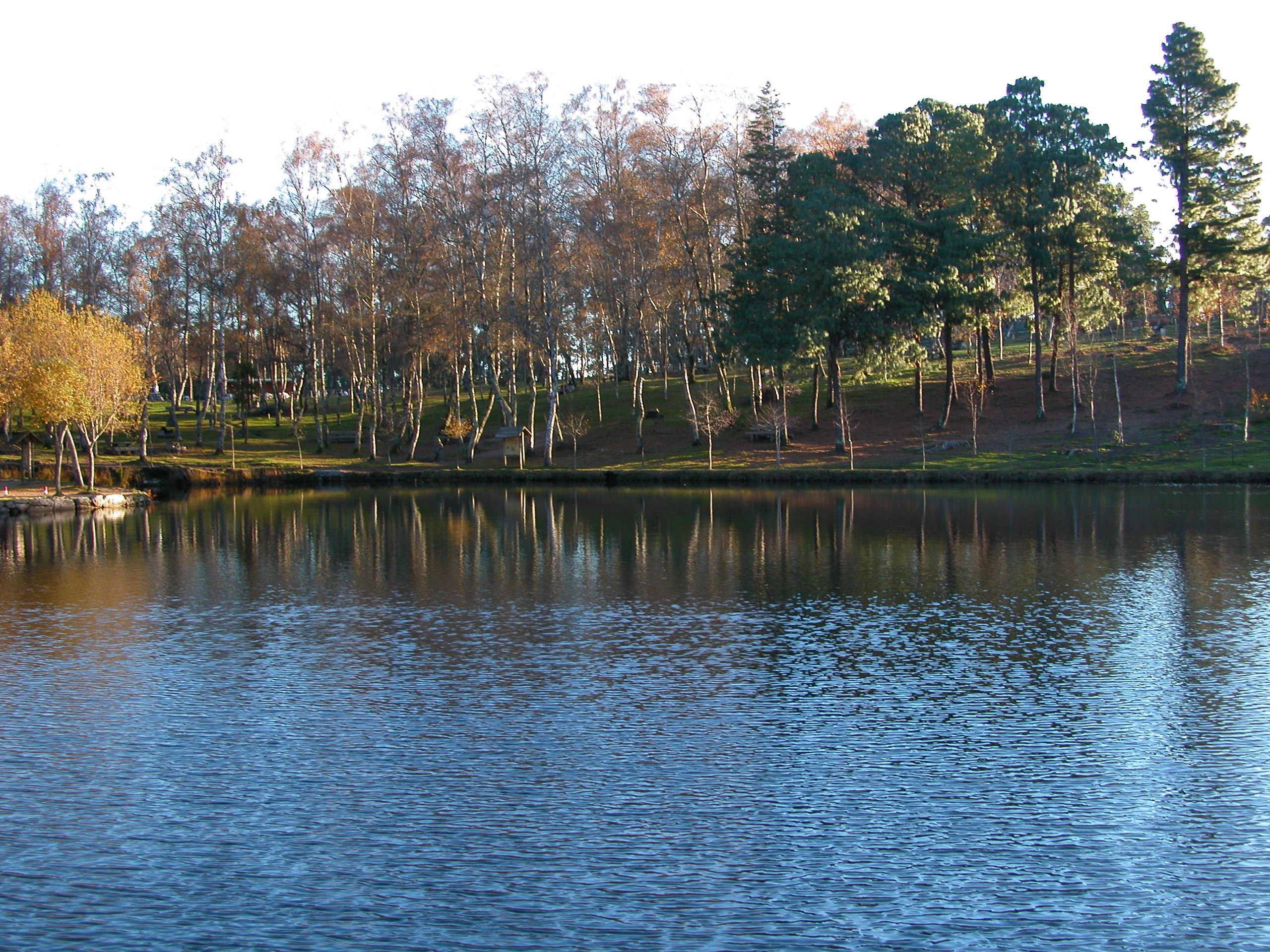
View of the lake.

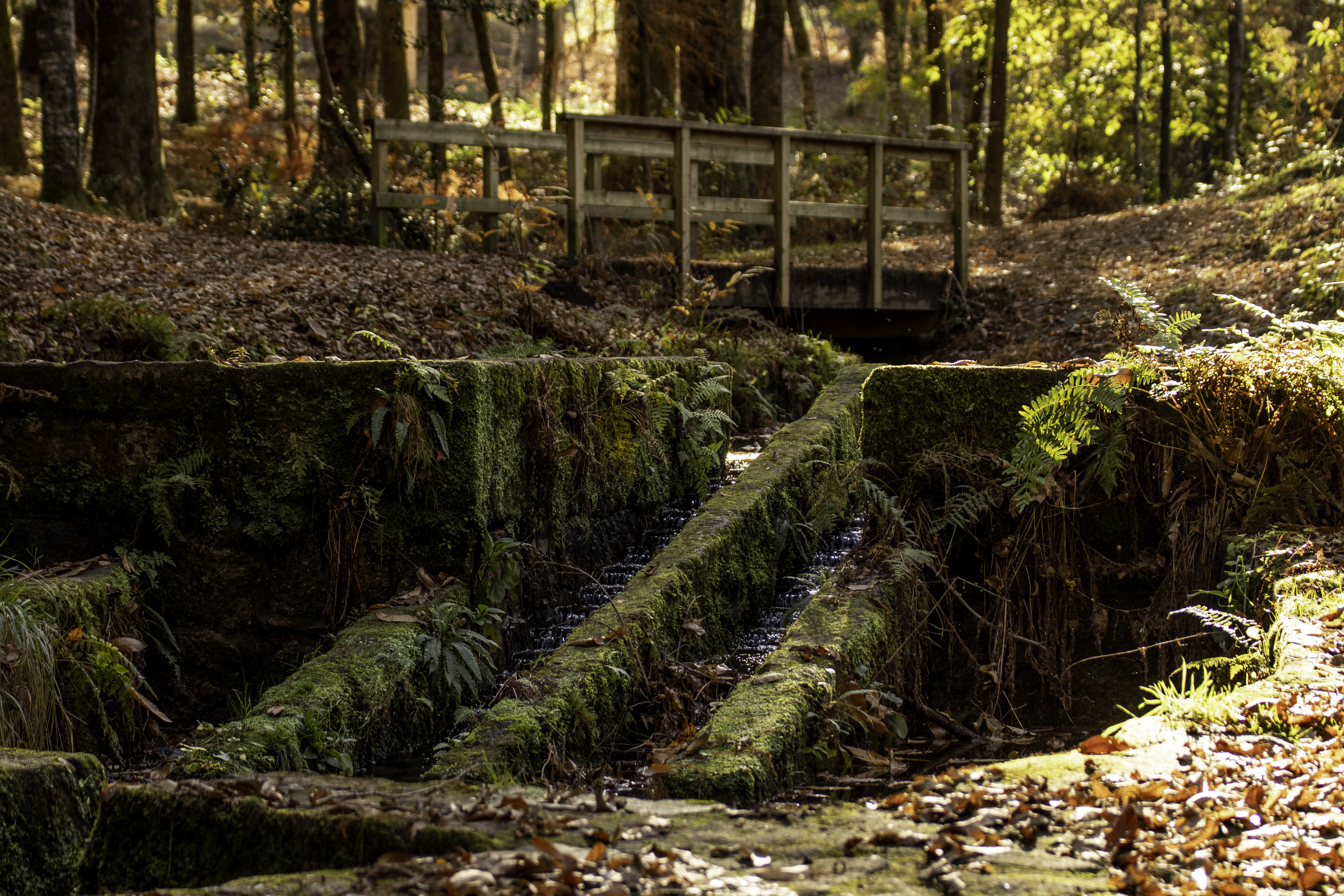
Castiñeiras stream.

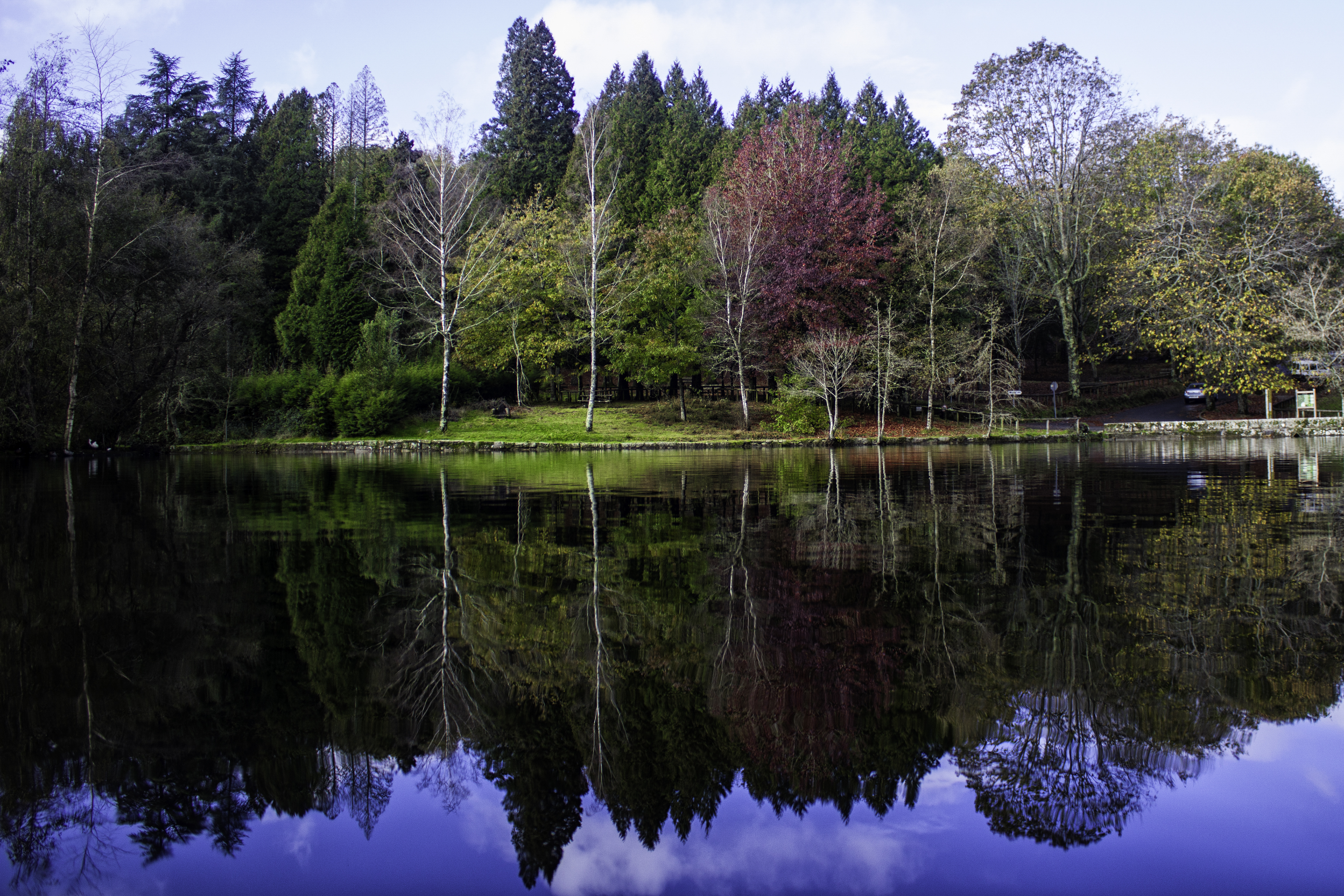
Lake

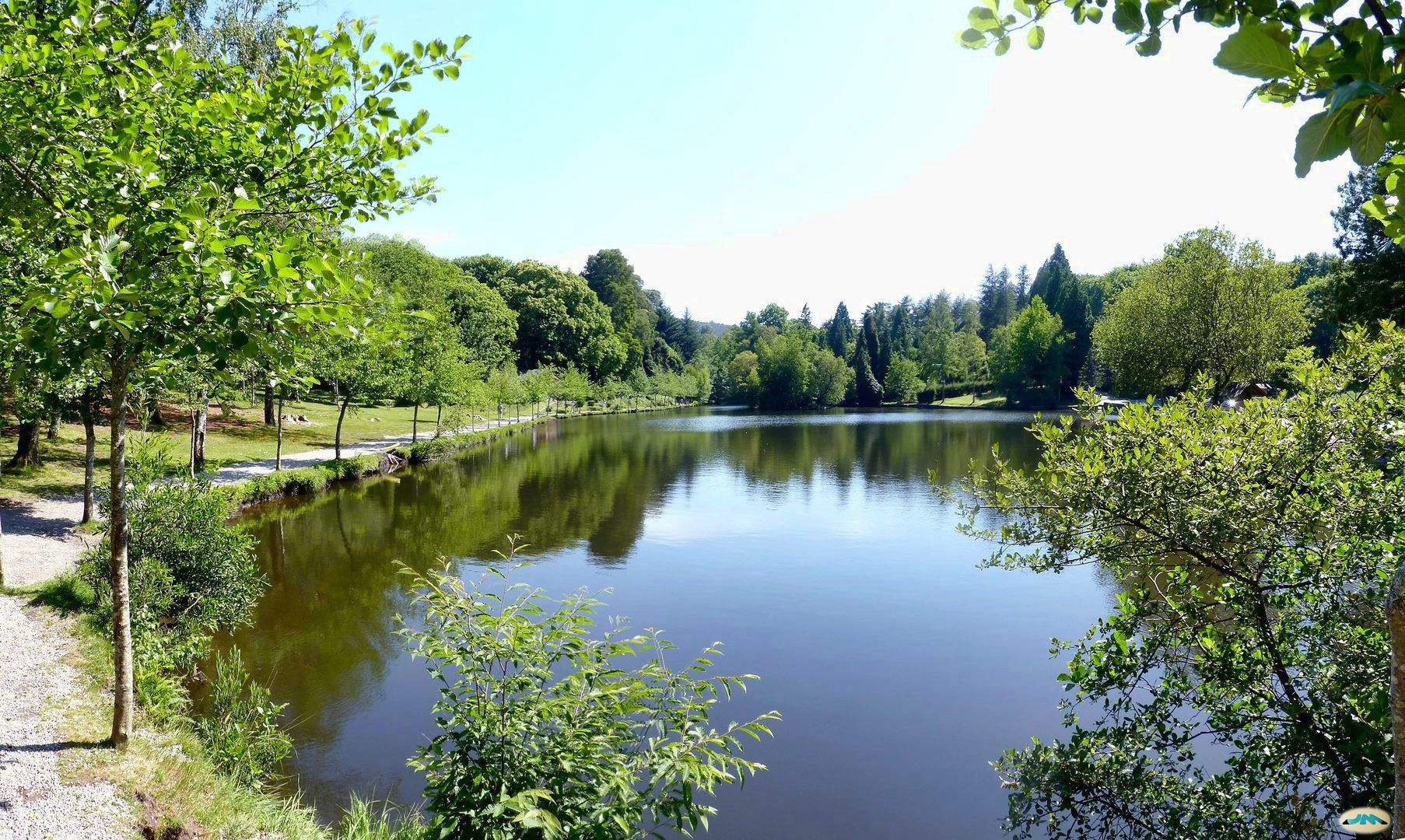
Lake
