= Xustáns, Ponte Caldelas =

Coordinates: 42°23′28″N 8°33′31″W

Xustáns
- Parish
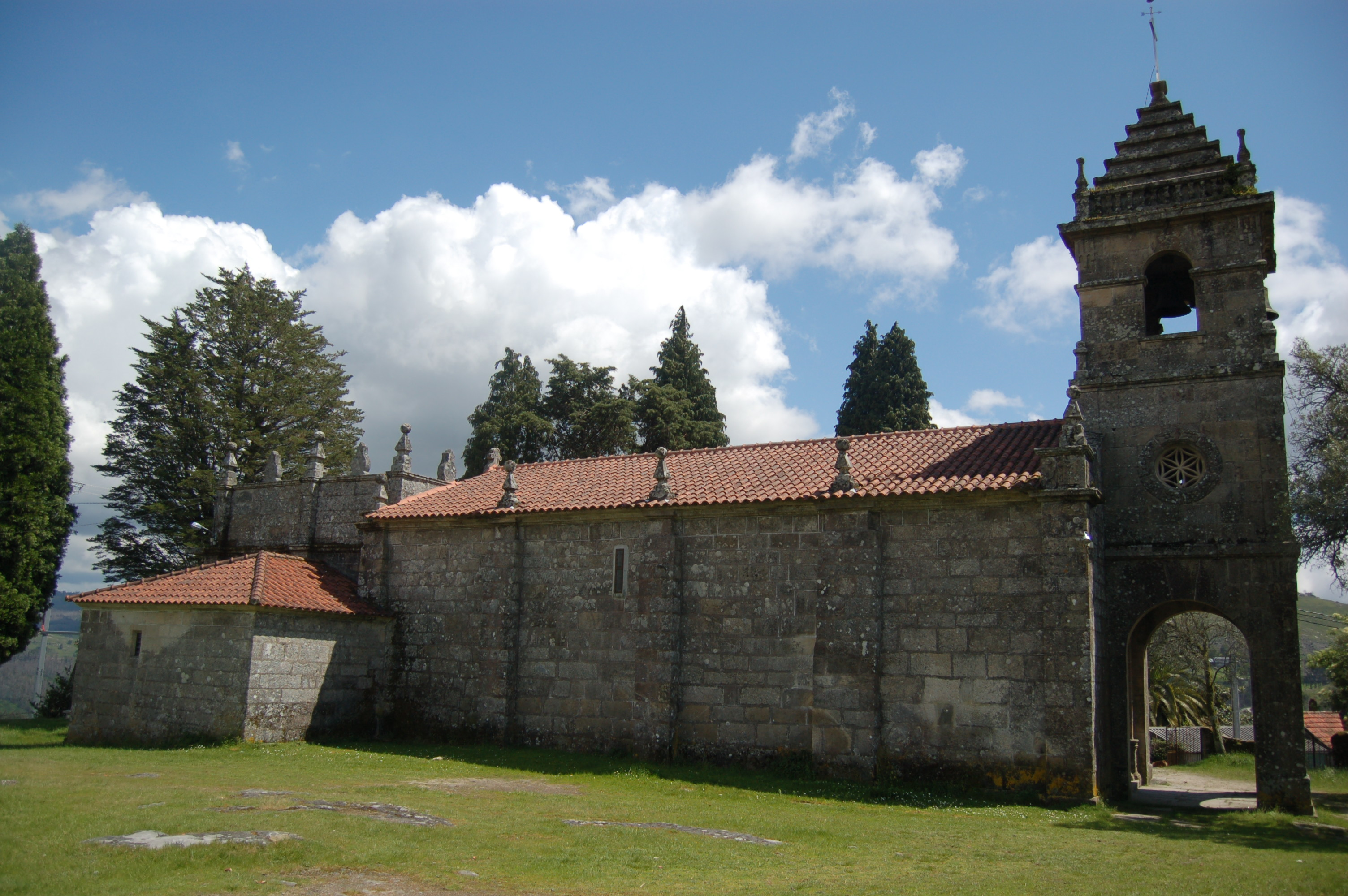
- Church of San Martiño de Xustáns.
- Interactive map of Xustáns
- Country: Spain
- Autonomous community: Galicia
- Province: Pontevedra
- County: Pontevedra
- Municipality: Ponte Caldelas
- Hamlet: A Aluncía, Baltar, Chan do Casal, O Sobreiro

Area
  - Total: 9.1 km^{2} (3.5 sq mi)

Population (2013)INE
  - Total: 553
  - Density: 61.2/km^{2} (159/sq mi)
- Time zone: CET (GMT +1)
  - Summer (DST): CEST (GMT +2)
- Postcode: 36127
- Area code: +34 986

Xustáns is a parish located in the municipality of Ponte Caldelas, in the autonomous community of Galicia, Spain. Its population was 553 in 2013 Census. It is a countryside area close to the city of Pontevedra.

== History ==
The first human appearances were by 3000 BC on the hills southwest of the parish, between the hamlets of Baltar and O Sobreiro. Then, it is believed people stayed there as farmers until today. There are documents proving the existence of the town since Middle Ages. Since it is a lightly populated area, it was not important to name. The Catholic Church of San Martiño (O Sobreiro), was built in the 17th−18th century. By the 18th century, the old hamlet of Cotas (located between A Aluncía and Baltar) was abandoned. At the same time, the hamlet of Baltar started growing.

In 19th and 20th centuries many people migrated to the closest cities (mostly Pontevedra) and countries like Argentina, Cuba, Brazil.

Today, the parish is still a countryside area even with the appearance of an industrial park in the 1980s on its north side.

== Geography ==
The parish is located on the west side of the municipality of Ponte Caldelas. It lies adjacent to the parishes of Tourón (N), Ponte Caldelas (E), Taboadelo (S) and on the west with the parishes of Tomeza and Marcón.

Natural borders are A Fracha mountains (W) and San Vicente River (E). The main river on the parish is the Guisal River, which makes a valley where the hamlets are.

== Demographics ==
Historical population

Year	Pop.	±%
1845	720	—
1877	770	+6.9%
1900	710	−7.8%
1920	740	+4.2%
1940	700	−5.4%
1960	660	−5.7%

Year	Pop.	±%
1980	760	+15.2%
1999	561	−26.2%
2005	610	+8.7%
2010	566	−7.2%
2012	557	−1.6%

Estimated (1877-1980) is 10% of the municipality's census. Data from 1845 is from Madoz's Encyclopedia and data from 2005 to 2012 is from INE

=== 1999 Census ===
The 1999 Census said the population of the parish was 561 (270 men and 291 women). Only 13.5% of the people were 16 or younger. The main age group was the one who was between 16 and 65 (63.3%) and 23.2% were 65 or older. 6% of the people were illiterate and only 1.6% had a college degree. Also, 84% of the buildings were built before 1950.
