= Jorge Canda =

Spanish politician (1953–2024)

Member of the Provincial Deputation of Pontevedra
- In office 2015–2017

Mayor of A Lama
- In office 1995–2023
- Preceded by: Manuel Rial González
- Succeeded by: David Carrera Cal

Personal details
- Born: Jorge Canda Martínez; 1953 A Lama, Spain
- Died: 1 September 2024 (aged 70–71) A Lama, Spain
- Party: CDS (1986–1991); PSdeG–PSOE (1991–2002); PPdeG (2002–2024)
- Occupation: Insurance broker

Jorge Canda Martínez (1953 – 1 September 2024) was a Spanish politician. A member of the Socialists' Party of Galicia and later the People's Party of Galicia, he served as mayor of A Lama from 1995 to 2023 and was a member of the Provincial Deputation of Pontevedra from 2015 to 2017.

Canda died in A Lama on 1 September 2024.
