= Ponte Caldelas =

- Municipality
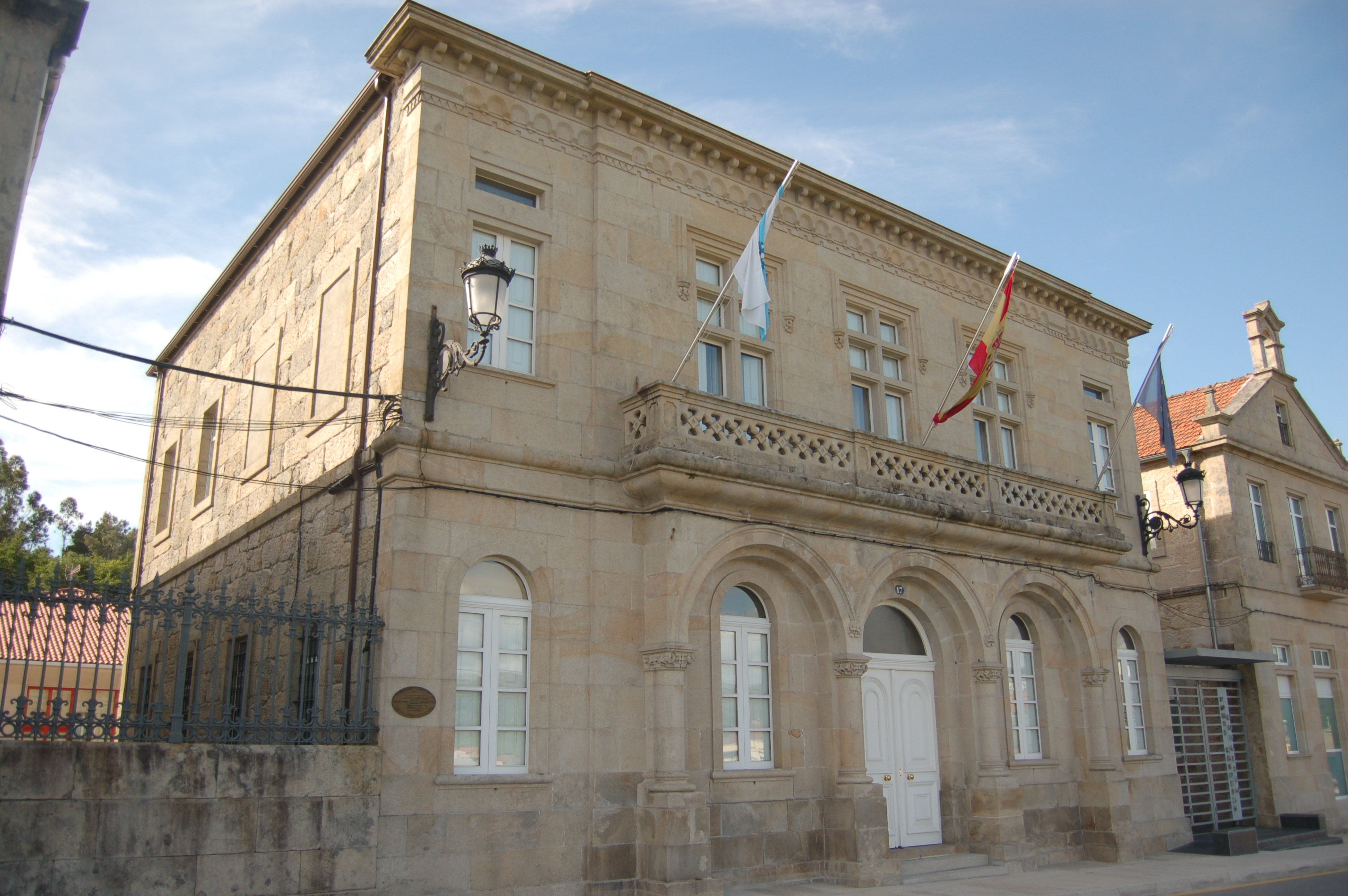
- Town hall

- Coat of arms

- Location in Spain
- Coordinates: 42°23′N 8°30′W
- Country: Spain
- Autonomous community: Galicia
- Province: Pontevedra
- Comarca: Pontevedra

Government
  - Mayor: Perfecto Rodríguez Muíños

Area
  - Total: 87 km^{2} (34 sq mi)

Population (2025-01-01)
  - Total: 5,609
  - Density: 65.9/km^{2} (170.8/sq mi)
- Time zone: UTC+1 (CET)
  - Summer (DST): UTC+2 (CET)
- Website: http://www.pontecaldelas.net

Ponte Caldelas is a municipality in the province of Pontevedra, in the autonomous community of Galicia, Spain. It belongs to the comarca of Pontevedra. It takes its name from an ancient bridge over the Río Caldelas.

== Etymology ==
The town is more than likely named after the old bridge over the river Verdugo, combined with its thermal springs (caldas originates from the Latin word calidae or hot in English).

== Location ==
Ponte Caldelas is bounded to the north by the municipality of Cotobade, to the south by Fornelos de Montes and Soutomaior, to east by A Lama and to the west by the municipality of Pontevedra.

== Parishes ==
Ponte Caldelas has nine parishes:

- Anceu
- Barbudo
- Caritel
- Forzáns
- A Insua
- Ponte Caldelas
- Taboadelo
- Tourón
- Xustáns

== History ==
In 1126 King Alfonso VII was granted the Loyalty title. On the other hand, says legend, the famous Queen Lupa, who persecuted the disciples of the apostle Santiago, was a native of this town and resided here. Later in the nineteenth century it was accorded the status of a Villa.

These lands were property of the cathedral of Santiago de Compostela. Gelmírez granted Ponte Caldelas privileges and franchises. In the past Ponte Caldelas belonged half to Tuy and half to the former province of Santiago.

== See also ==
- List of municipalities in Pontevedra
