= Trahamunda =

Spanish nun and saint

Saint Trahamunda was a nun from Galicia, Spain who lived in the High Middle Ages and is venerated as a saint. Her life, which has been preserved in the form of a legend, relates her to the Monastery of San Juan de Poio in Pontevedra. She is considered the patron saint of homesickness and emigrants.

== Life ==
According to tradition, Trahamunda was a novice in the convent of San Martín on the island of Tambo when she was kidnapped in an attack by the Moors while caring for the convent's sheep (according to some sources the attack was by Abderramán I, and others claim it was by his descendent Abderramán II) . She was taken to Córdoba to join the harem, but she refused. As a result, she was jailed for eleven years. According to legend, on June 23, she asked God to meet her in Poio the next day, the day of San Juan Bautista. While asleep that night, an angel gave her a palm branch, with which she traveled to Galicia. Later, she planted the palm near the Monastery of San Juan de Poyo, where it germinated and remained until the 16th century; the meadow in which she planted it was called "Meadow of the Palm".

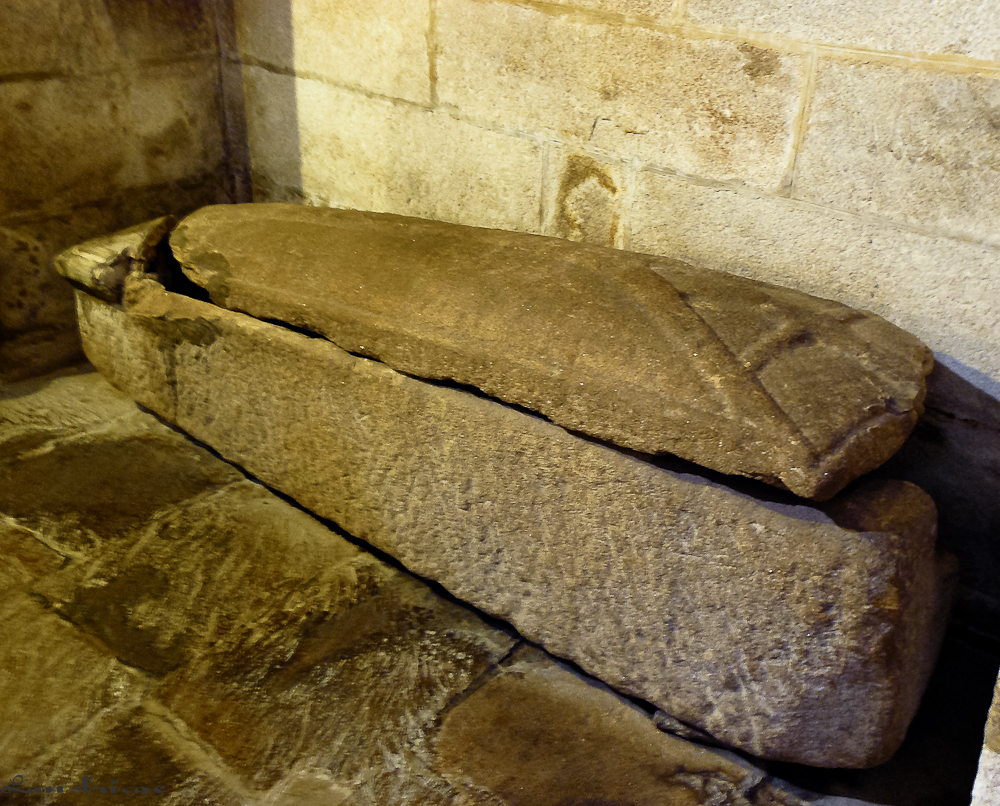
Trahamunda's tomb

Her tomb, in Suevo-Visigothic style, is in the chapel of the Poyo monastery. Her feast day is celebrated on November 14, but residents of Poio also celebrate her around June 23.
