= Pontevedra (comarca) =

Coordinates: 42.4333°N 8.61667°W

- Comarca
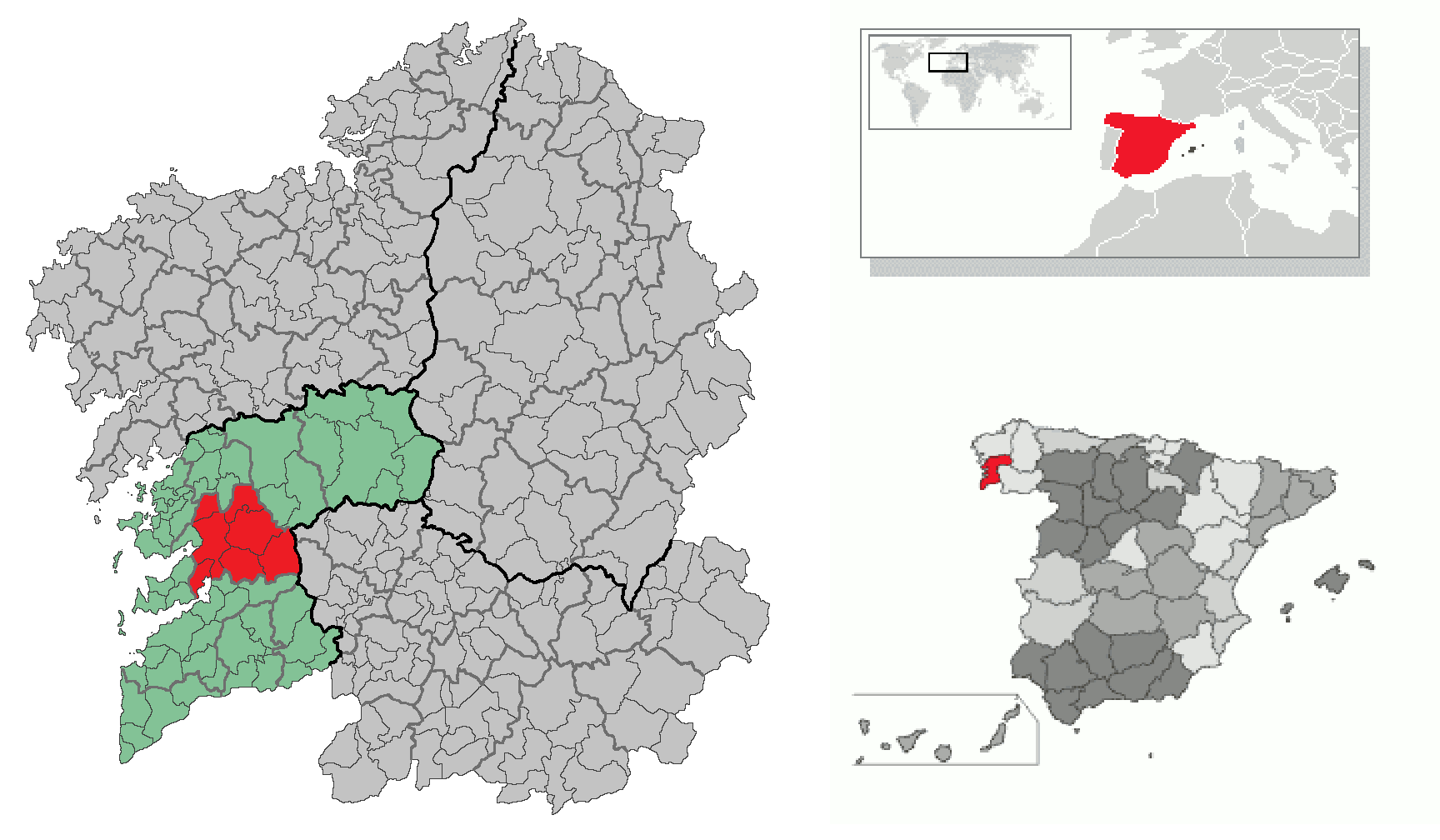
- Country: Spain
- Autonomous community: Galicia
- Province: Pontevedra
- Capital: Pontevedra
- Municipalities: List: Pontevedra, Poio, Barro, Campo Lameiro, Cotobade, A Lama, Ponte Caldelas, Vilaboa

Area
  - Total: 634.43 km^{2} (244.95 sq mi)

Population (2020)
  - Total: 125,280
  - Density: 197.47/km^{2} (511.44/sq mi)
- Time zone: UTC+1 (CET)
  - Summer (DST): UTC+2 (CEST)

Pontevedra is a comarca in the Galician Province of Pontevedra, Spain, and centred on the city of Pontevedra. It covers an area of 634.43 km^{2}, and the overall population of this local region was 15,625 at the 2011 Census; the latest official estimate (as at the start of 2018) was 124,351.

== Municipalities ==
The comarca comprises the following eight municipalities:

| Name of municipality | Population (2001) | Population (2011) | Population (2018) |
|---|---|---|---|
| Pontevedra | 74,942 | 82,346 | 83,260 |
| Poio | 14,271 | 16,642 | 17,073 |
| Barro | 3,468 | 3,713 | 3,623 |
| Campo Lameiro | 2,235 | 2,017 | 1,778 |
| Cerdedo-Cotobade | 6,987 | 6,245 | 5,697 |
| A Lama | 2,947 | 2,891 | 2,397 |
| Ponte Caldelas | 5,921 | 5,738 | 5,533 |
| Vilaboa | 5,735 | 6,033 | 5,919 |
| Totals | 116,506 | 125,625 | 125,280 |
