= Vilaboa =

Coordinates: 42°25′00″N 8°33′00″W

- Municipality
- Flag Coat of arms

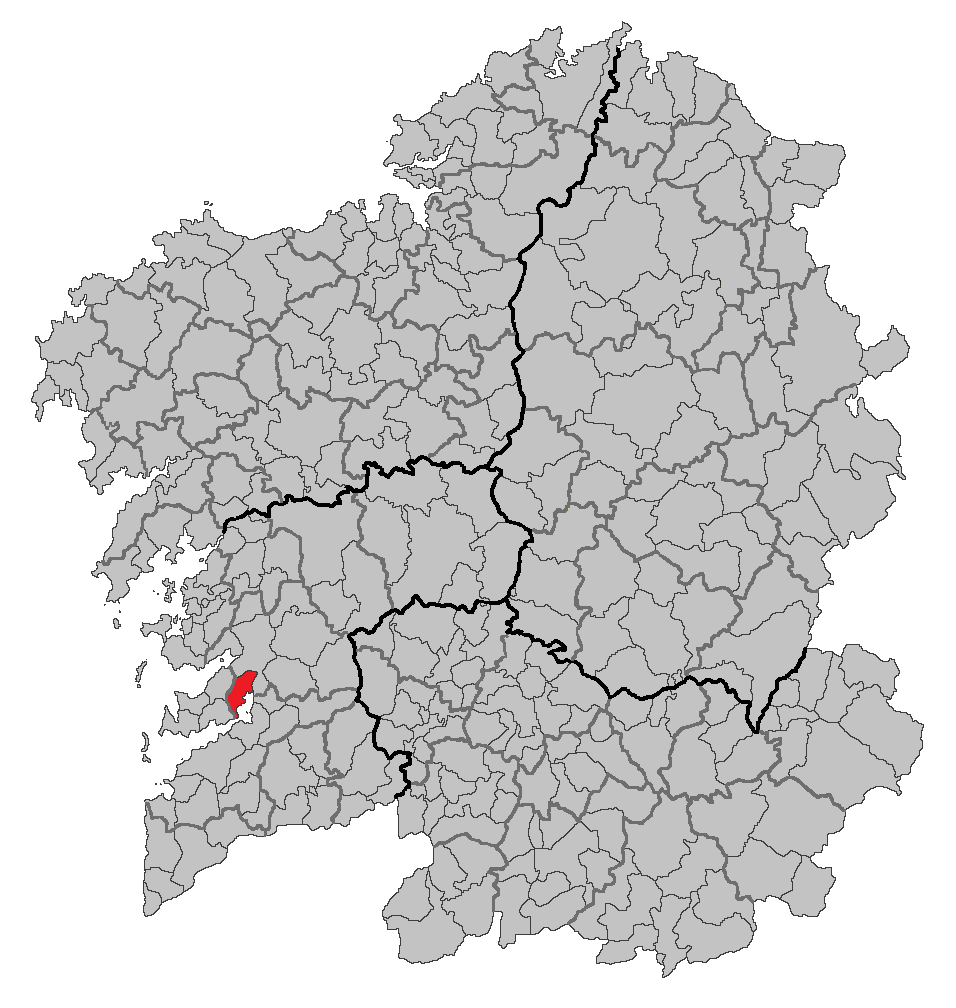
- Situation of Vilaboa within Galicia
- Country: Spain
- Autonomous community: Galicia
- Province: Pontevedra
- Comarca: Pontevedra

Government
  - Alcalde (Mayor): César Poza González

Population (2025-01-01)
  - Total: 5,856
- Time zone: UTC+1 (CET)
  - Summer (DST): UTC+2 (CET)
- Website: Official website

Vilaboa is a municipality in the province of Pontevedra, in the autonomous community of Galicia, Spain. It belongs to the comarca of Pontevedra. The town is located on the Atlantic Ocean, on San Simon's Cove (Ensenada de San Simon), and is a part of Ria de Vigo.

In 2023, the recorded population was 5,950.

== Etymology ==
The Galician name Vilaboa comes from Latin VILAM BONAM, meaning "good ville".

== Parishes ==
Vilaboa is made up of 5 distinct parishes:

- Bértola
- Cobres
- Figueirido
- Santa Cristina de Cobres
- Vilaboa

== Festivals ==
The most popular festival in Vilaboa is Carnival, celebrated mostly in two of the parishes - San Adrián de Cobres and Santa Cristina.

== See also ==
- List of municipalities in Pontevedra
