= Poio =

- Municipality
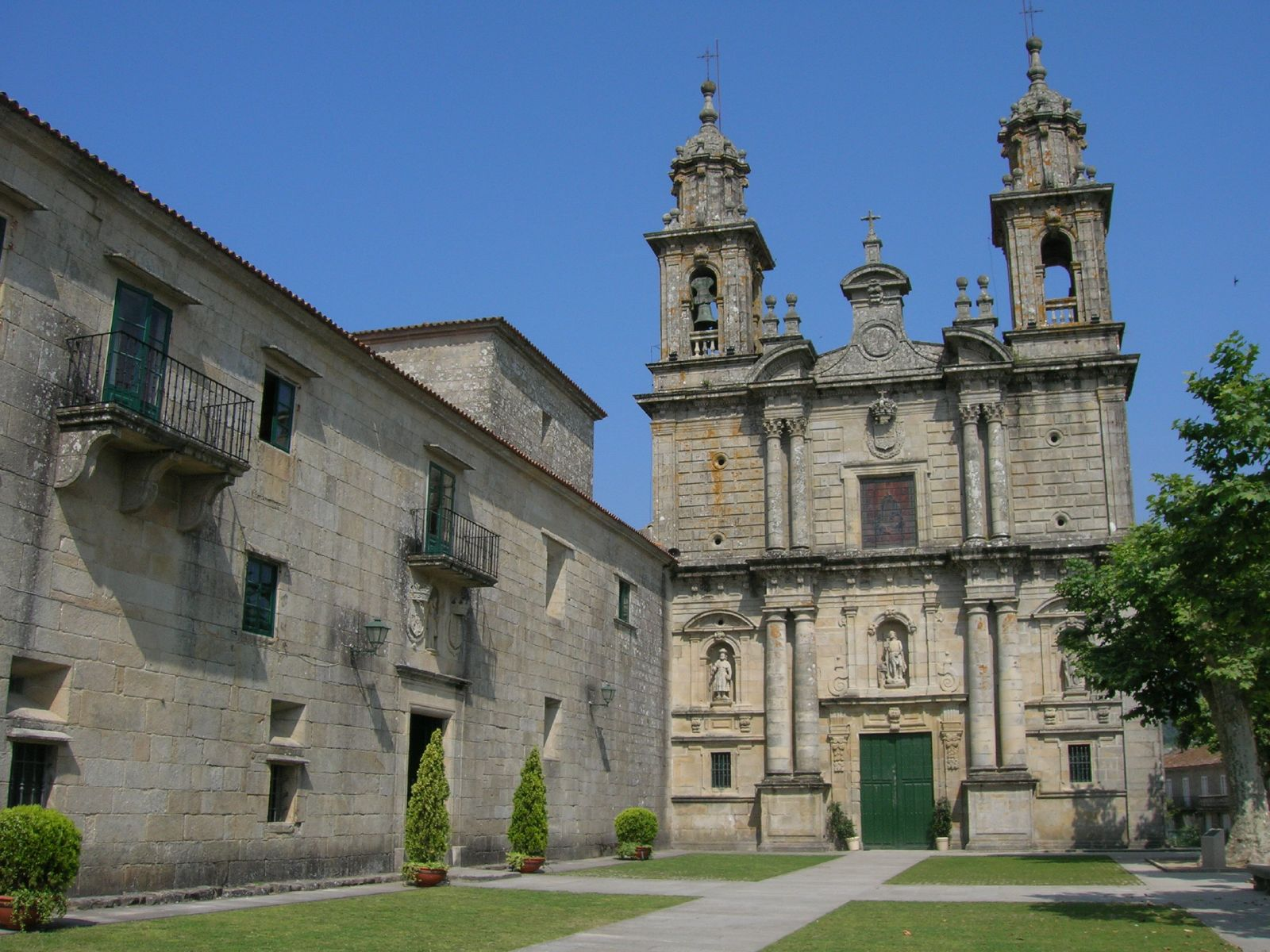
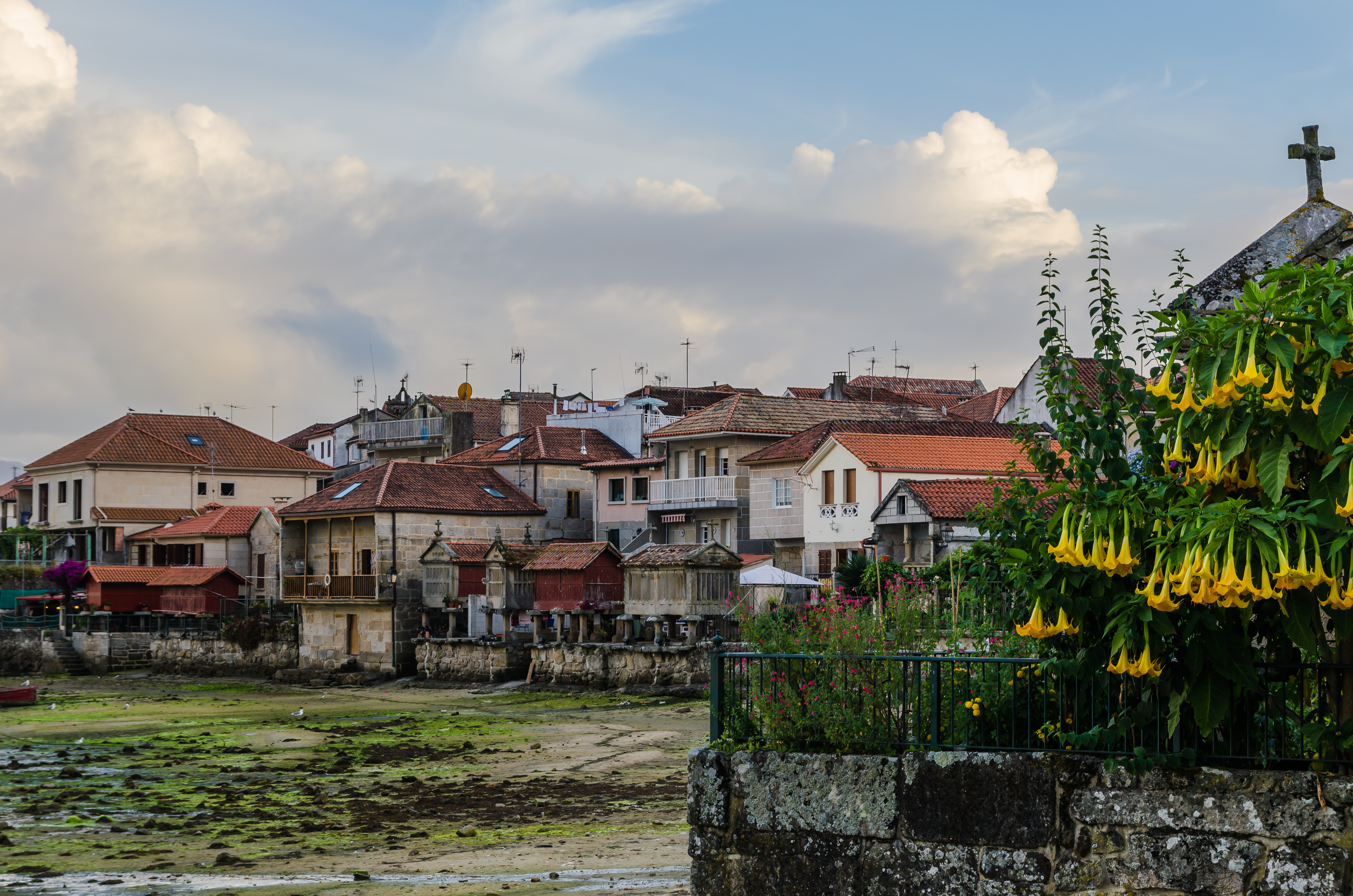
- Monastery of San Xoán Combarro

- Coat of arms
- Location of Poio
- Coordinates: 42°26′N 8°40′W
- Country: Spain
- Autonomous community: Galicia
- Province: Pontevedra
- Comarca: Pontevedra
- Parroquia: Combarro, Raxó, San Xoán de Poio, San Salvador de Poio, Samieira

Government
  - Alcalde (Mayor): Luciano Sobral Fernández (BNG)

Population (2025-01-01)
  - Total: 17,434
- Time zone: UTC+1 (CET)
  - Summer (DST): UTC+2 (CEST)
- Website: https://www.concellopoio.gal/

Poio is a municipality in the province of Pontevedra, in the autonomous community of Galicia, Spain. It belongs to the comarca of Pontevedra. Poio is located in the north shore of the Ría de Pontevedra, between Sanxenxo and the provincial capital, Pontevedra. The municipality is adjacent with Meaño, Meis, Pontevedra and Sanxenxo and combines mountain and sea areas.

Tambo island, an uninhabited island located in the middle of the Pontevedra estuary, officially belongs to Poio but it is under the control of the Spanish Navy and disembarkment is not allowed.

== Geography ==
Poio has an approximate area of 34 square kilometers (13 sq mi). Its highest peak is Mount Castrove, 667 meters (2,188 ft) high and from where one can see views of the Pontevedra and Arousa estuaries. The views also spotlight the Alto de Raxó and Samieira. Its coast of more than 20 km (12 mi) is full of beautiful beaches with quiet waters.

Tambo island has an area of 0.28 square kilometers (0.11 sq mi) and its highest peak is 80 meters (260 ft) high.

== Demography ==
Poio is a dormitory area of the city of Pontevedra. It has a growing market due to its proximity to the urban center (only the Lérez river separates the two municipalities). The parish of San Salvador, the nearest to the city, is the parish that increases the census. The tourism industry has begun to thrive in Raxó and Combarro within the last few years.

== Sights ==
Sights include the Monastery of San Xoán de Poio, the picturesque fishing village of Combarro with its Hórreos by the sea and several prehistoric rock engraving sites; all declared Bien de Interés Cultural (Heritage of Cultural Interest).

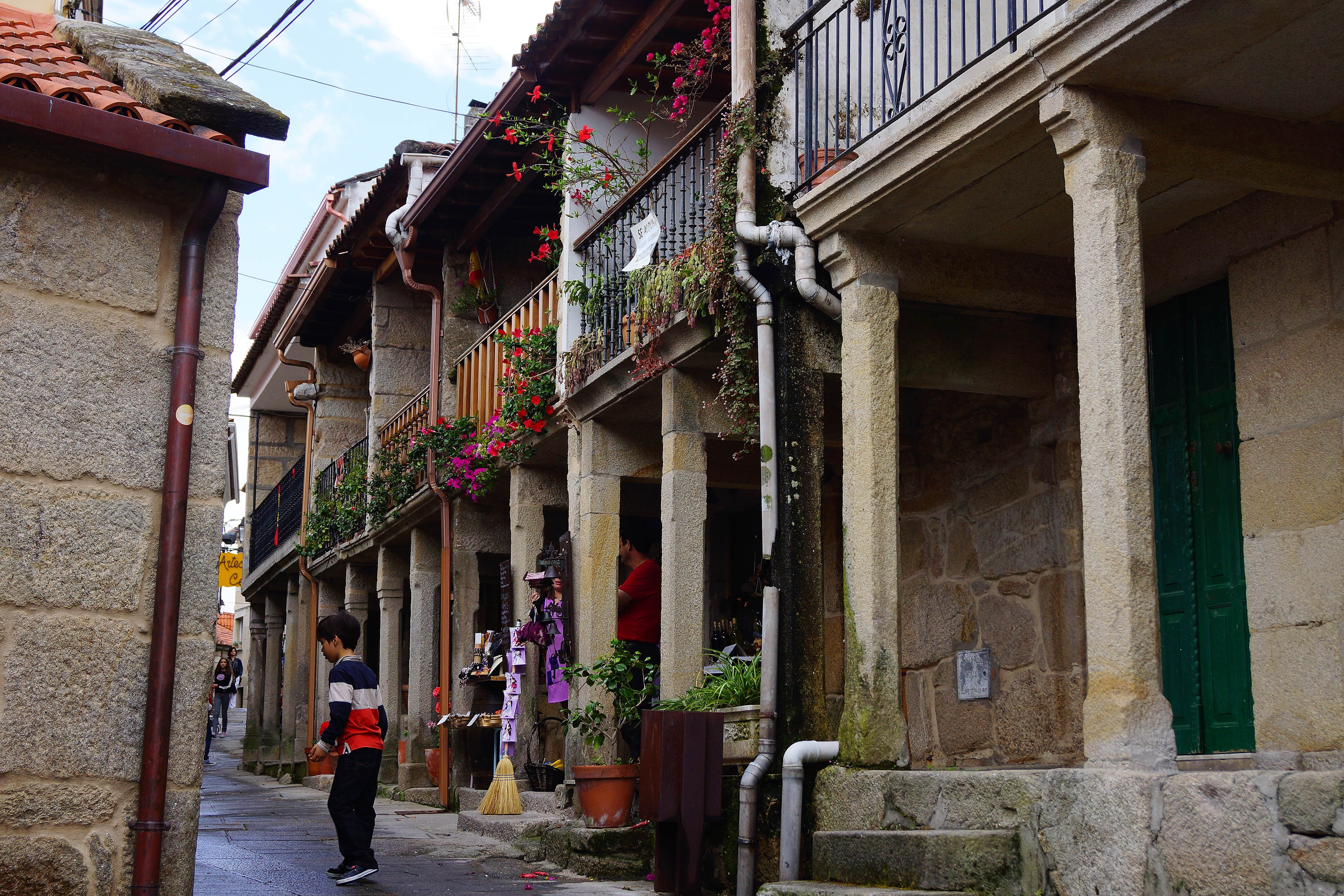
Combarro

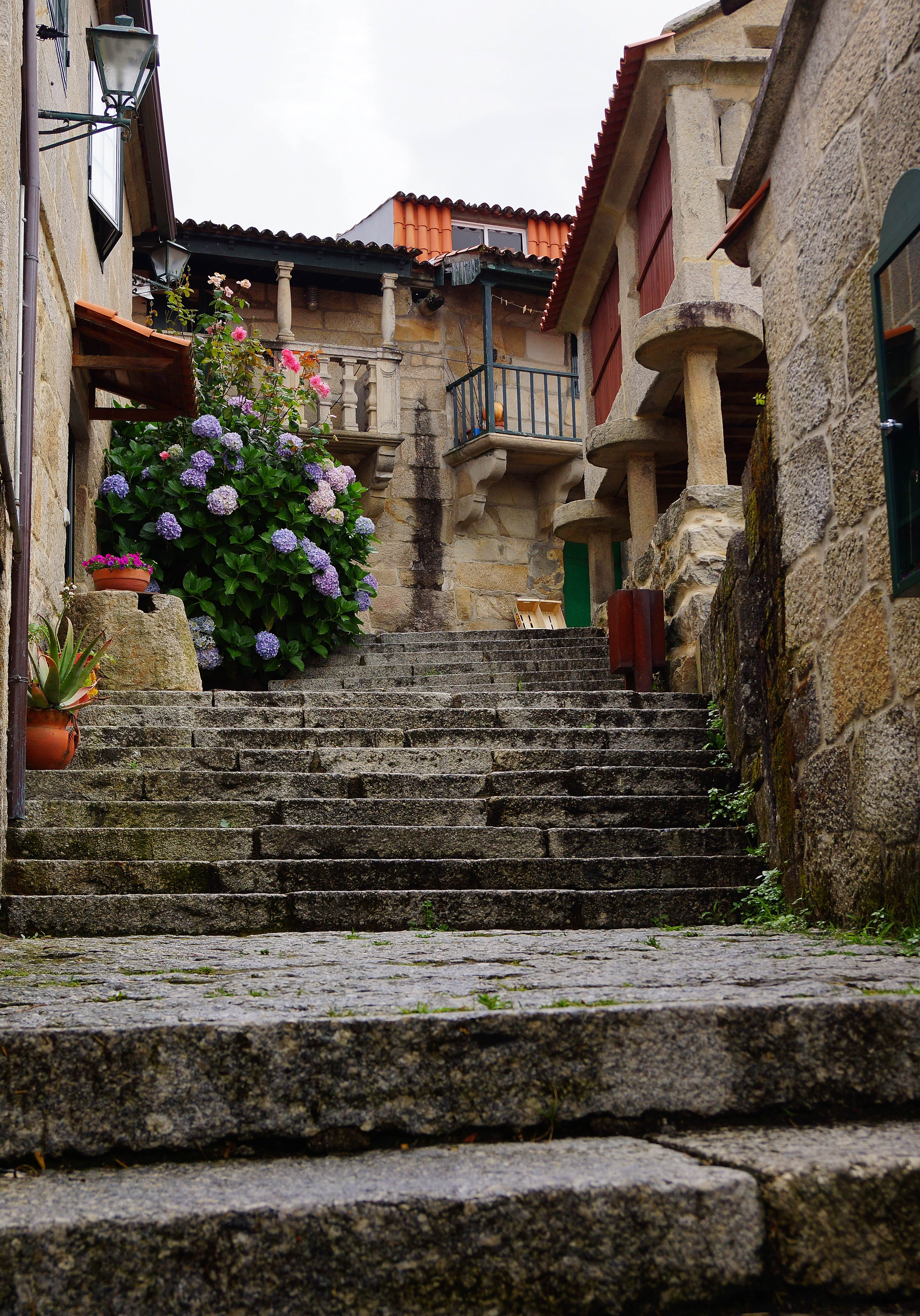
Combarro

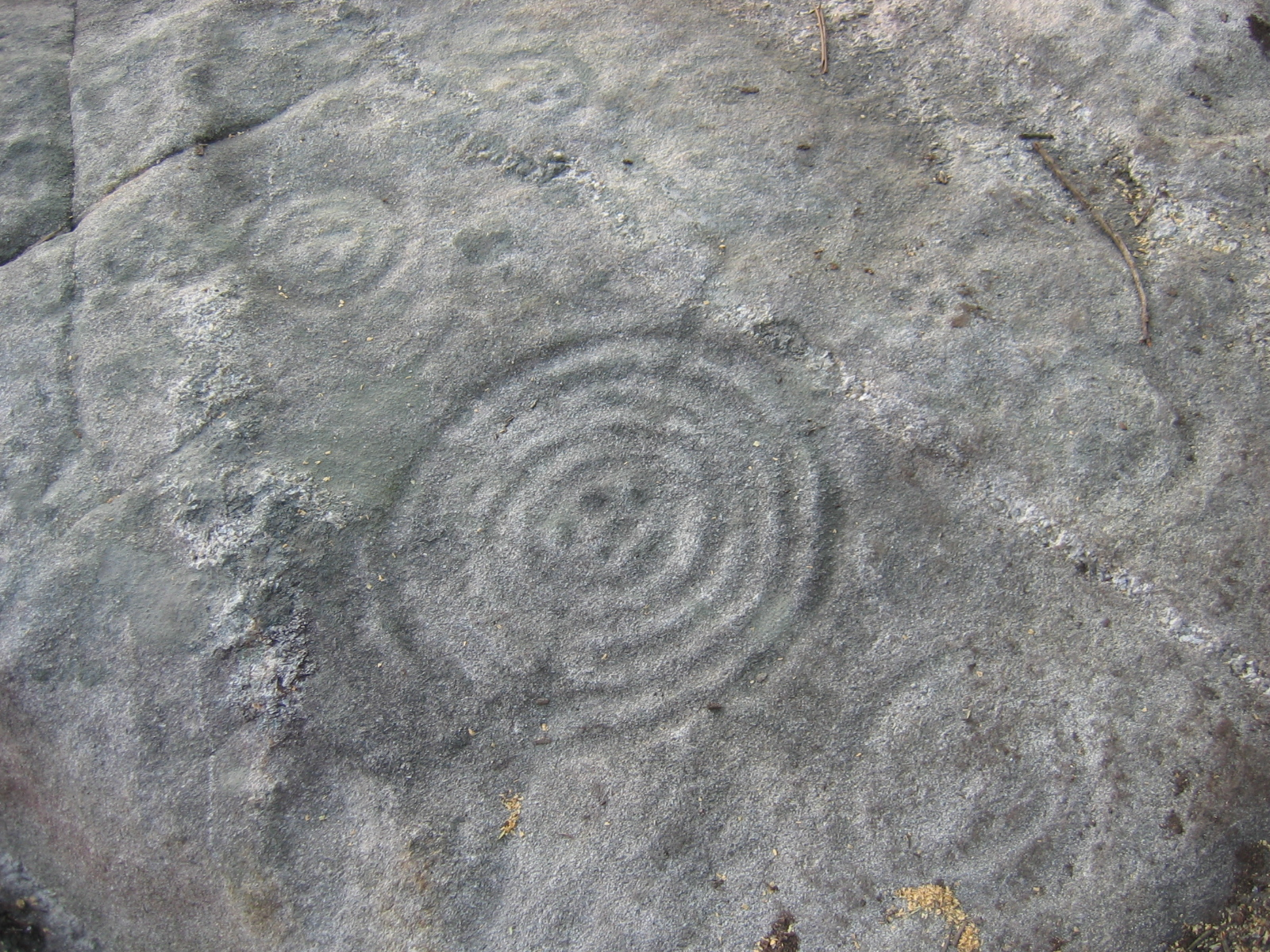
Prehistoric rock engravings

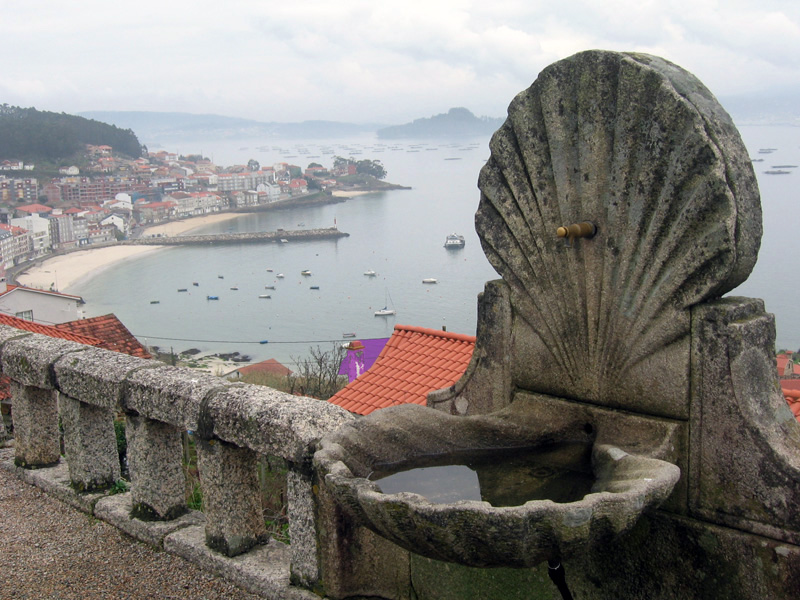
Raxó

== See also ==
- List of municipalities in Pontevedra
