= A Lama =

- Municipality
- Coat of arms

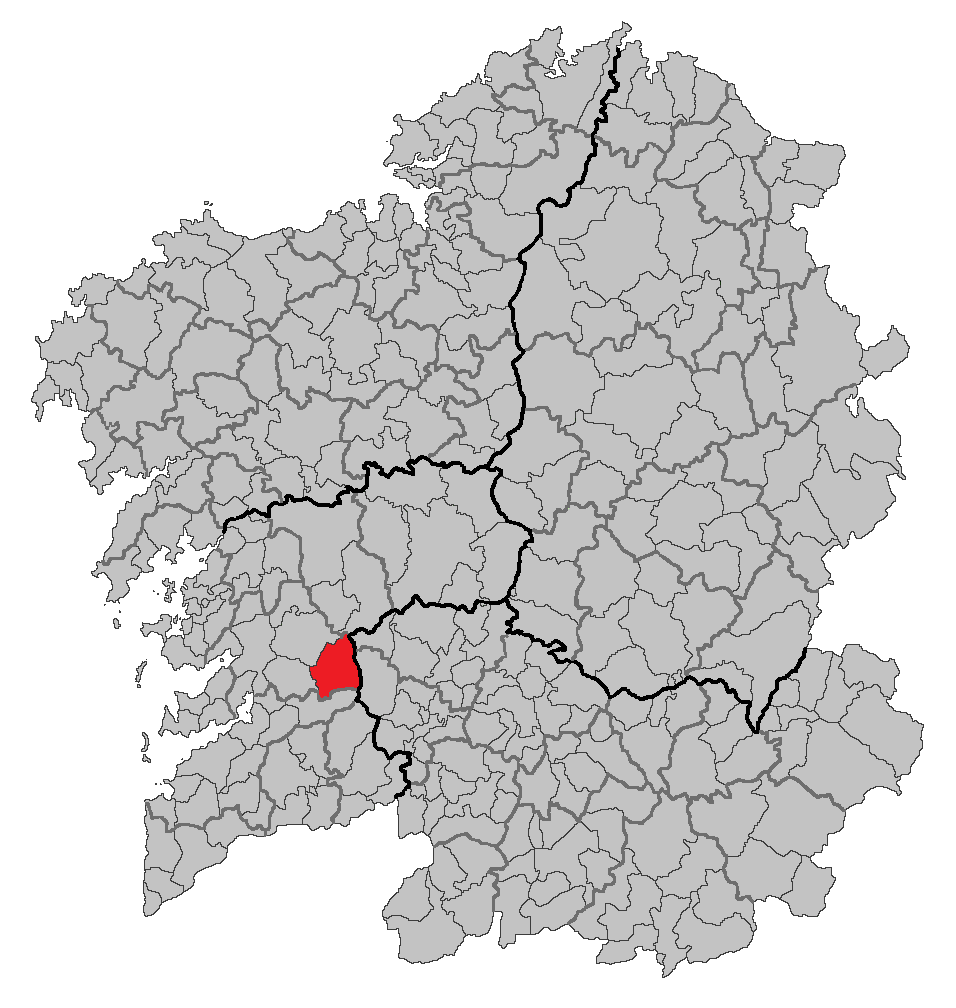
- Location of A Lama within Galicia
- Coordinates: 42°23′28″N 8°26′38″W
- Country: Spain
- Autonomous community: Galicia
- Province: Pontevedra
- Comarca: Pontevedra

Population (2025-01-01)
  - Total: 2,437
- Time zone: UTC+1 (CET)
  - Summer (DST): UTC+2 (CET)

A Lama is a municipality in the province of Pontevedra, in the autonomous community of Galicia, Spain. It belongs to the comarca of Pontevedra.

== Etymology ==
Originally it was the capital of a region called Cal de Vergaza. It was later known as Pedreira, and now as A Lama. The Galician word lama comes from Latin LAMA, referring to a place made of mud.

== Location ==
The Council of A Lama is a municipality within the province of Pontevedra and is predominantly rural. It has many attractions and natural areas suitable for rural tourism which is having a boom in recent years.

A Lama is a municipality located in the northeast within the province of Pontevedra. It covers an area of 111.76 km^{2}. The distance to the capital of the province is 31 kilometers and 50 kilometers to Vigo.

The neighboring municipalities are Cotobade to the northwest, to the west Ponte Caldelas, Fornelos de Montes to the south, to the northeast Forcarei, and to the east Beariz, in the province of Ourense. The main roads are the roads Pontevedra - A Cañiza that passing through the parishes of Verducido and Gaxate, and the road from the City Cotobade that goes through the parish of Antas communicating with the City of Beariz.

== See also ==
- List of municipalities in Pontevedra
