= Adalid (surname) =

Adalid is a surname. Notable people with the surname include:

- Agustín Lazo Adalid (1896–1971), Mexican artist and playwright
- Manuel de Adalid y Gamero (1872–1947), Honduran composer
- Marcial del Adalid y Gurréa (1826–1881), Spanish composer
- María del Adalid (1873–1930), Spanish painter
