= Castle of Soutomaior =

Medieval castle in Galicia, Spain

Soutomaior Castle
- Castelo de Soutomaior; Castillo de Sotomayor
- Soutomaior, Pontevedra, Galicia, Spain
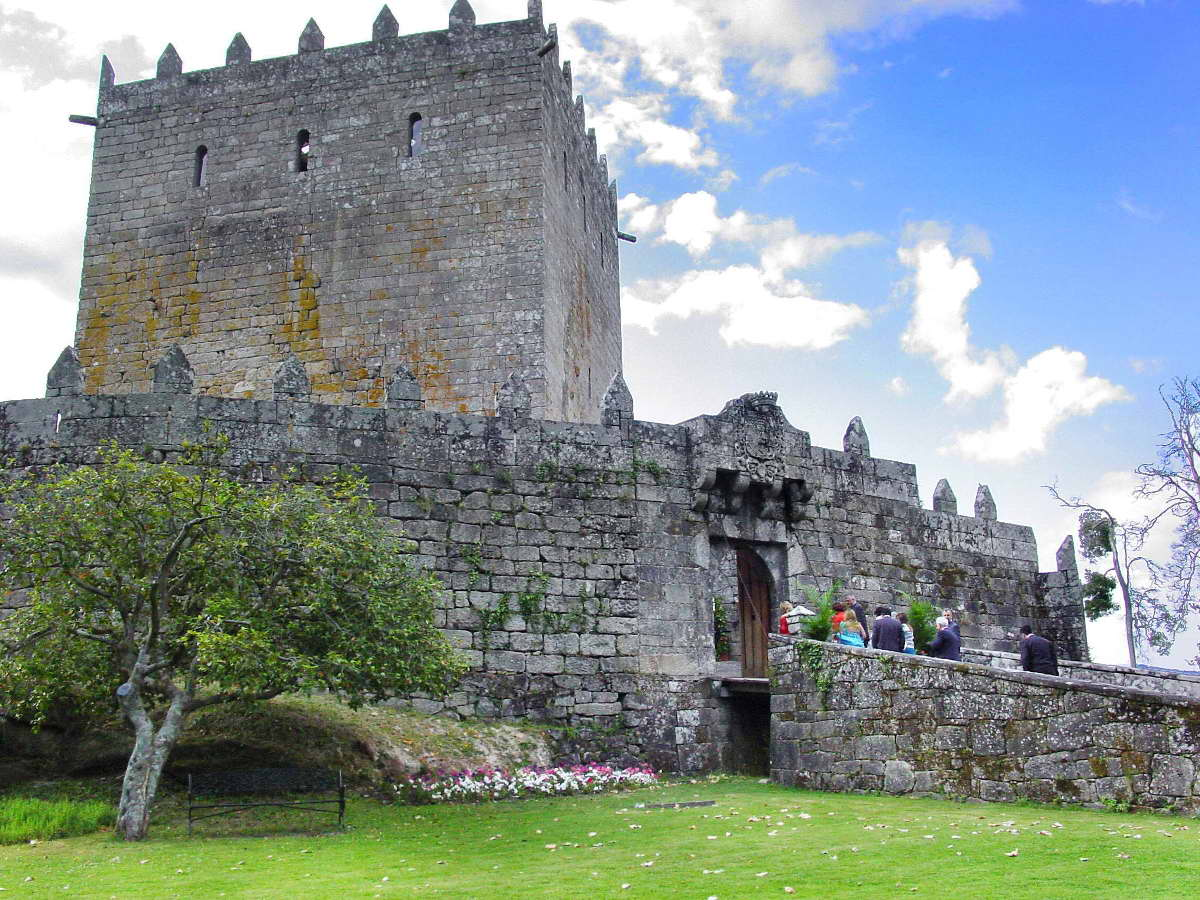

Site information
- Type: Castle
- Owner: Concello de Soutomaior
- Operator: Diputación de Pontevedra
- Open to the public: Yes
- Condition: Restored

Location
- Location of Soutomaior Castle within Galicia
- Location within Galicia
- Coordinates: 42.3295°N 8.5683°W

Site history
- Built: 12th century
- Materials: Stone
- Battles/wars: Irmandiño revolt

Soutomaior Castle (Galician: Castelo de Soutomaior) is a medieval castle located in the municipality of the same name in Galicia, Spain. It is situated about 119 metres above sea level on the top of Mount Viso.

It was built in the 12th century, although its exact date of construction is unknown. The castle was remodelled in the 15th century and reached its greatest splendour under Pedro Álvarez de Soutomaior, better known as Pedro Madruga, becoming one of the majors centres of power in the Kingdom of Galicia.

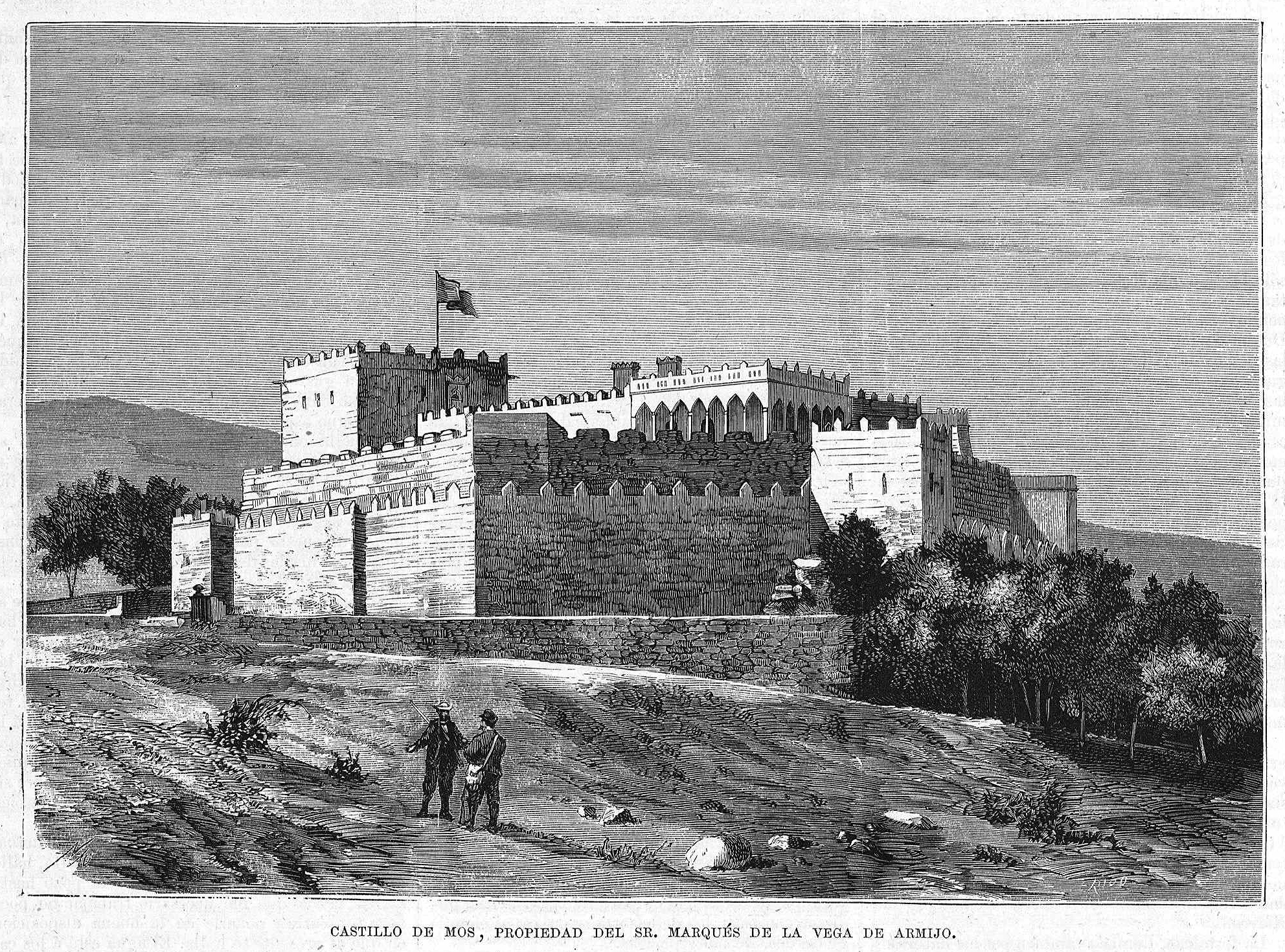
The castle in 1877, after renovations carried out by the Marquises of Vega de Armijo

In the late 19th century, the castle underwent a major transformation. In 1870, the Marquises of Vega de Armijo turned it into their summer residence, adding the Galería de Damas and introducing Gothic Revival elements to the medieval complex. The surrounding gardens were also laid out and developed during this period.

The property subsequently passed to the Marchioness of Ayerbe and her husband, Dr Lluria, who built a sanatorium in the surrounding grounds. In 1917, they lost ownership of the property. In 1982, the castle was acquired by the Provincial Council of Pontevedra, which undertook a major restoration of the complex. Today, the castle houses a museum and is open to the public.

== See also ==
- Sobroso Castle
- Fort Monterreal
