= Fornelos Castle =

Coordinates: 42°08′50″N 8°13′47″W

Fornelos Castle (la Torre de Fornelos) is a castle located in Crecente in the Pontevedra province of Spain.

These castle keep is the remains of a rectangular castle built during the Middle Ages. Nowadays, the tribute tower is conserved. The castle is dated from the 12th century.

The fights between the King of Galicia, Alfonso VII, and his cousin Afonso I of Portugal took place in the castle. Some time after the Irmandiños rebellion destroyed the castle, Pedro Madruga rebuilt it. Just out of curiosity, Madruga kept Diego de Muros, bishop of Tui, chained in this tower.

Sancho I of Portugal donated this place to the Casa de Fornelos' founders, Doña Aldonza Vázquez de Fornelos and Fernán Pérez de Castro who became owners.

The most outstanding part of the castle is the tribute tower. This has a square base and it is 62 feet tall with four floors. The entrance is in the ground floor.
