= Pambre Castle =

Medieval castle in Galicia, Spain

Coordinates: 42°51′36″N 7°56′54″W

- Castelo de Pambre
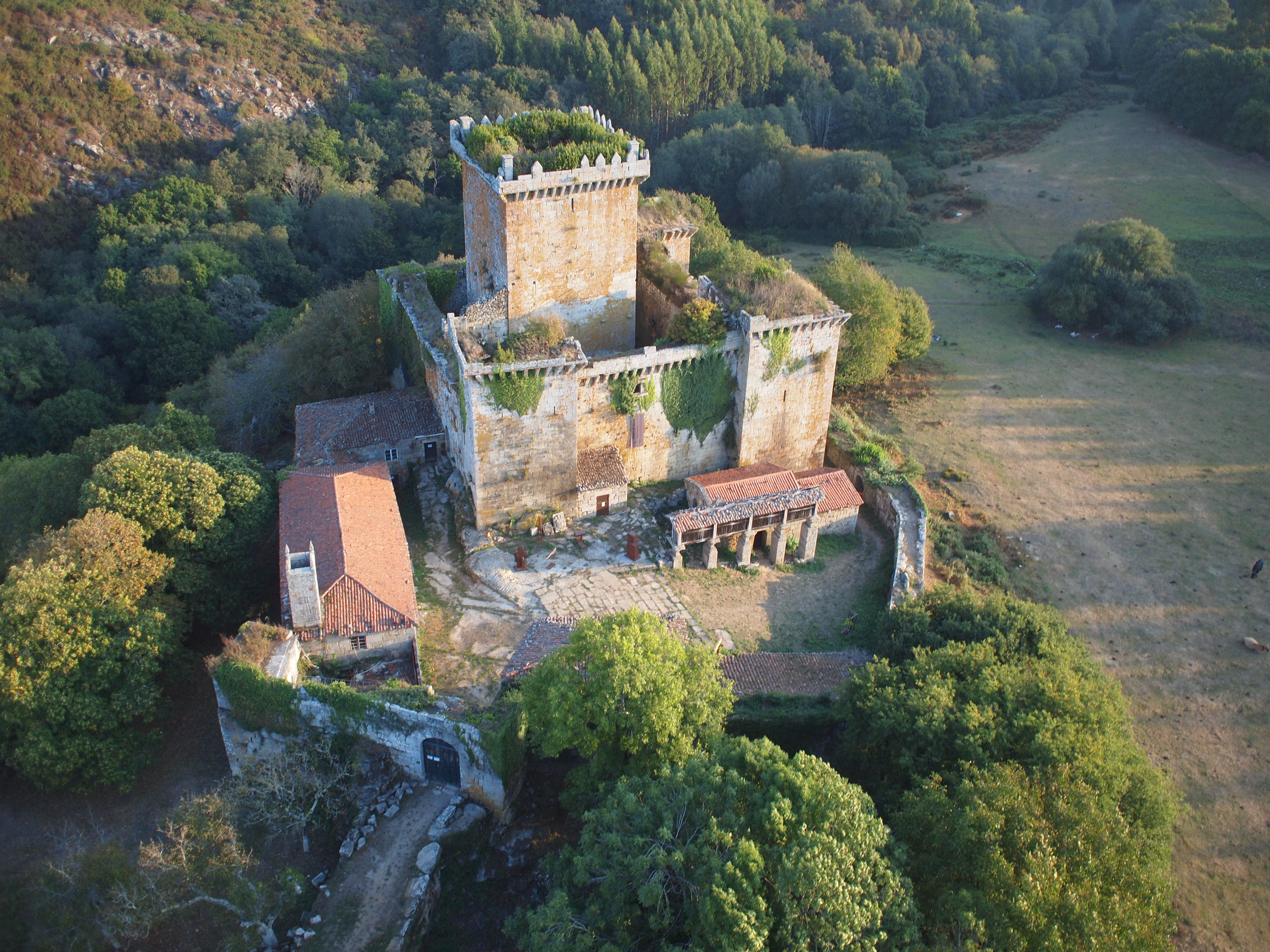
- Aerial view of the Pambre castle before its restoration

Site information
- Type: Castle
- Owner: Xunta de Galicia

Site history
- Built: ~1375
- Battles/wars: Irmandiño revolts

Pambre Castle (Galician: Castelo de Pambre) is a medieval fortress located in the parish of Pambre, within the municipality of Palas de Rei, in the province of Lugo, Galicia, Spain. Perched atop a rocky hill overlooking the Pambre River, the castle is considered one of the finest examples of medieval military architecture in Galicia. Notably, it was one of the few fortresses to withstand the Irmandiño revolts of the 15th century.

== History ==
The castle was constructed around 1375 by Gonzalo Ozores de Ulloa, a Galician nobleman. Its strategic location made it a significant site during the conflicts between King Peter I of Castile and his half-brother, Henry of Trastámara.

=== Irmandiño revolts ===
During the mid-15th century, Galicia was the scene of widespread civil unrest known as the Irmandiño revolts (1467–1469), a popular uprising against feudal abuses by the nobility. Organised by members of the Santa Irmandade (Holy Brotherhood), the movement targeted the fortified castles and manor houses that symbolised aristocratic oppression. Over a hundred castles were attacked and destroyed by the rebels.

Castillo de Pambre was one of the few major fortifications in Galicia that withstood the Irmandiño attacks. Its remote location, strong defensive design, and possibly a well-prepared garrison contributed to its survival. As a result, the castle remains a rare surviving example of pre-modern military architecture in the region, while many others were never rebuilt after the revolt.

Over the following centuries, the castle changed ownership multiple times. In 1484, it became the property of the Counts of Monterrei. By the late 19th century, the Duke of Alba sold the castle to a local resident, José Soto, for 27,000 pesetas. Subsequent ownership saw the castle in the hands of the Moreiras family and later Manuel Taboada Fernández, who bequeathed it to the religious order Hermanos Misioneros de los Enfermos Pobres in 2009.

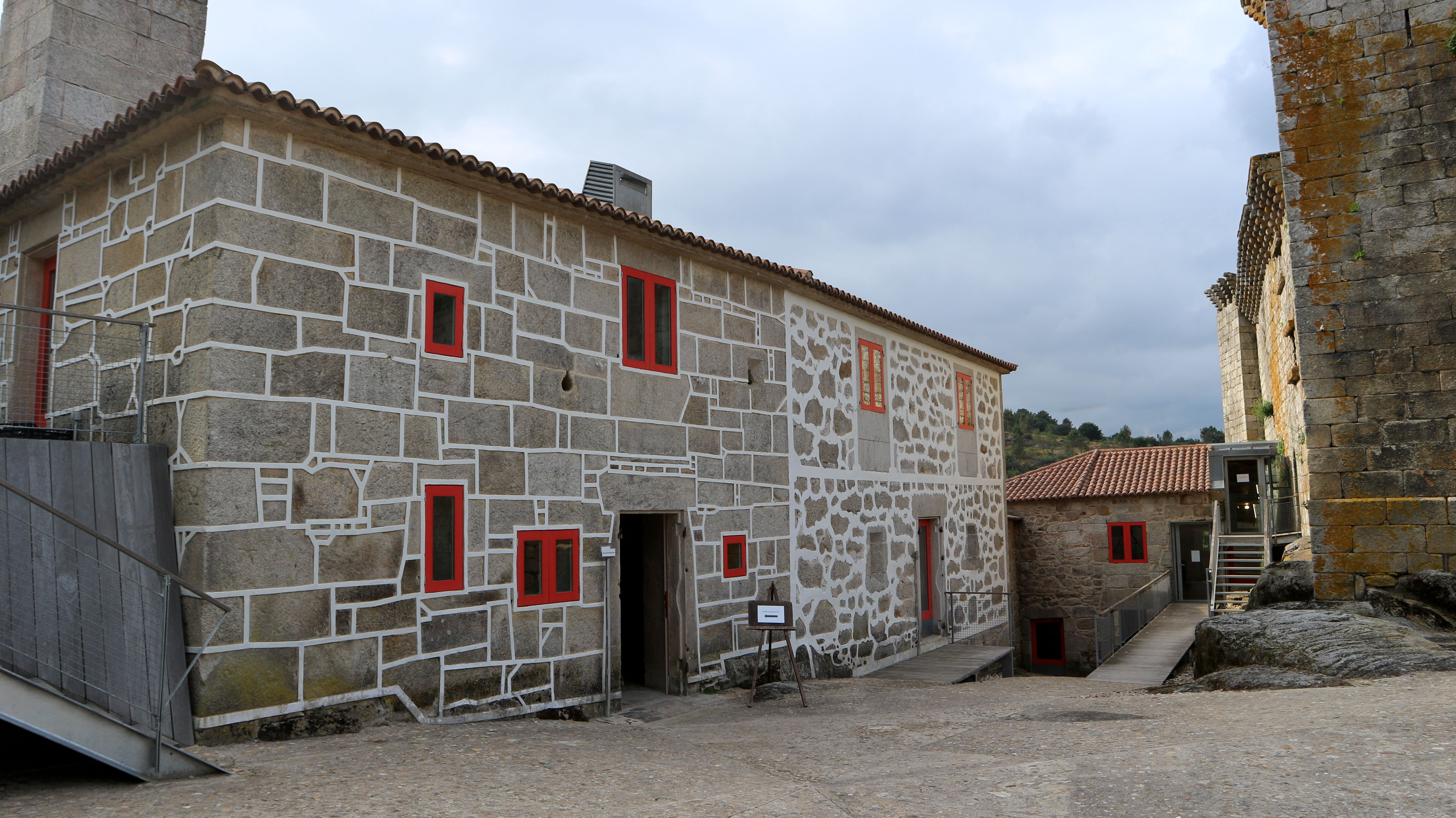
Courtyard of the castle after its restoration

=== Restoration and public access ===
Recognising its historical significance, the Xunta de Galicia (the regional government) purchased the castle in 2012 and undertook extensive restoration between 2015 and 2016. Modern metal structures were installed to facilitate access to the towers and walls, allowing visitors to explore the fortress safely. The castle is open to the public year-round, with guided tours available. Visiting hours vary seasonally, and an admission fee is charged.

== Architecture ==
The castle features a square layout, encompassing a central keep (Torre de Homenaxe) surrounded by four smaller square towers at each corner. The fortress is enclosed by an irregularly shaped outer wall that conforms to the rocky terrain. The main entrance is marked by a semicircular arch adorned with the coat of arms of the Ulloa family. Within the castle grounds stands a 12th-century chapel dedicated to Saint Peter, which served as the parish church until the 18th century.

== Pilgrimage context ==
Although not situated directly on the Camino Francés, Castillo de Pambre lies a few kilometres south of the route, near the town of Palas de Rei. Its location makes it a practical detour for pilgrims interested in Galician medieval architecture or seeking a quieter, more contemplative site off the main path. The castle is accessible by local footpaths or a short drive from the Camino, making it an appealing side trip for those with time to explore beyond the traditional pilgrimage route.

== Cultural significance ==
The castle's resilience during the Irmandiño revolts has cemented its status as a symbol of medieval Galician heritage. Its proximity to the Camino de Santiago makes it a notable landmark for visitors to the region. The fortress has also been featured in Galician literature, notably in the novel O Castelo de Pambre by Antonio López Ferreiro, underscoring its cultural and historical importance.
