= Rafael Alberto Pérez González =

- Died: December 4, 2019 (aged 77)
- Citizenship: Spanish
- Occupation: communication theorist

Rafael Alberto Pérez González (February 6, 1942 – December 4, 2019) was a Spanish communication theorist best known for developing the New Strategic Theory (Nueva Teoría Estratégica, NTE), a framework that redefined strategic thinking through a communication-centered lens.

Pérez González studied law at the University of Santiago de Compostela (PhD exthesis), later earning degrees in advertising and business administration in Madrid. He completed a Ph.D. in Communication Sciences at the Complutense University of Madrid, where he taught for over four decades.

Rafael Alberto is recognized for his role in shaping academic discourse around strategic communication in Ibero-America. He developed the New Strategic Theory (NTE), which emphasized communication as a fundamental aspect of strategy, diverging from traditional economic and military-based models. NTE led to the founding of academic initiatives such as the Ibero-American Forum on Communication Strategies (FISEC), where he served as Honorary President, and the Itinerant Chair of New Strategic Theory (CiNTE).

Pérez González authored or co-authored over 100 academic works, including 26 books and chapters published in multiple languages, and he was a high-level consultant for companies, public bodies, and institutions in the field of strategic communication.

His work also introduced the ESTRATEGAR Model, which proposed a human-centered approach to strategy emphasizing collaboration over confrontation, and the SiAER Model, a decision-making framework aimed at improving organizational adaptability through stakeholder engagement.

Rafael Alberto received the National Research Award from Gardoqui-Sarpe (1974), and was honored for Estrategias de Comunicación as the Best Ibero-American Communication Book at the IV Cumbre de Comunicadores (2005).

Rafael Alberto’s father was a Spanish landscape painter, José Francisco Pérez Martínez. His children include the Spanish businessman Alejandro Pérez Ferrant and his sister, Emma Pérez Ferrant.
