= María del Adalid =

Spanish painter (1873–1930)

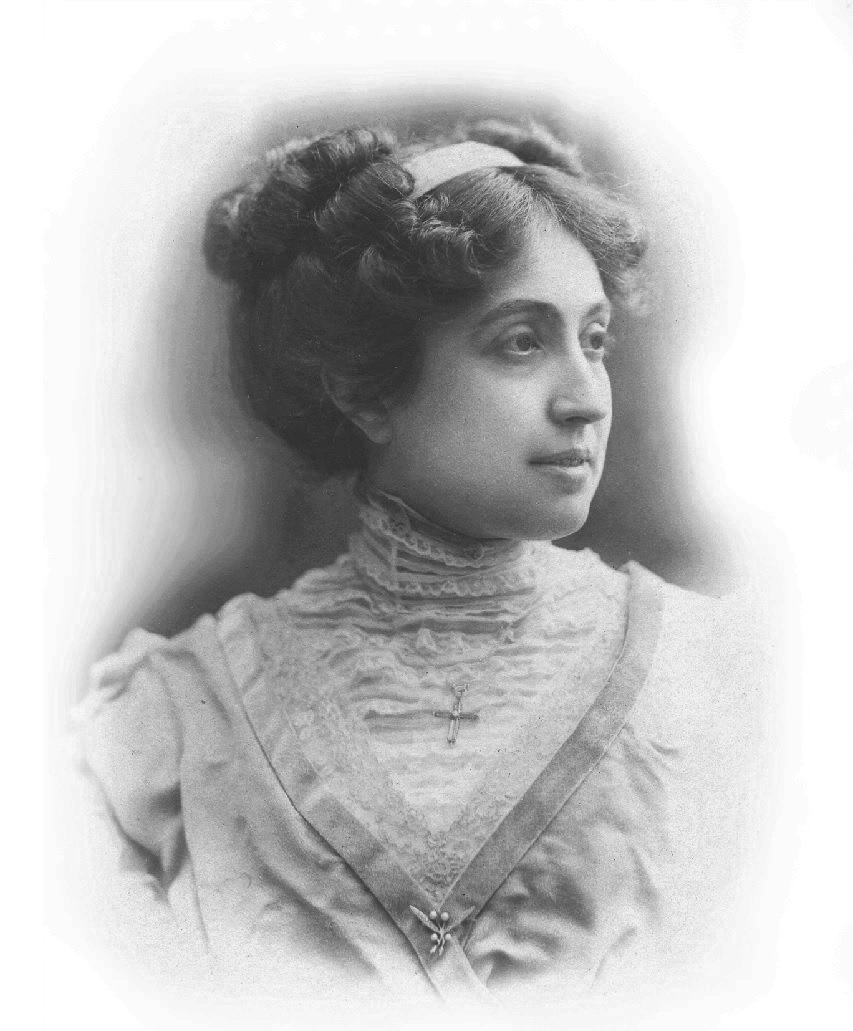
María del Adalid (1909)

María de los Dolores del Adalid y González Garrido (better known as María del Adalid González and María del Adalid Garrido; Madrid, 1873 – A Coruña , 1930) was a Spanish painter and the first person named an honorary member of the Royal Galician Academy. She had a very good relationship with the painter Francisco Llorens Díaz, a disciple of Carlos de Haes.

== Early life and education ==
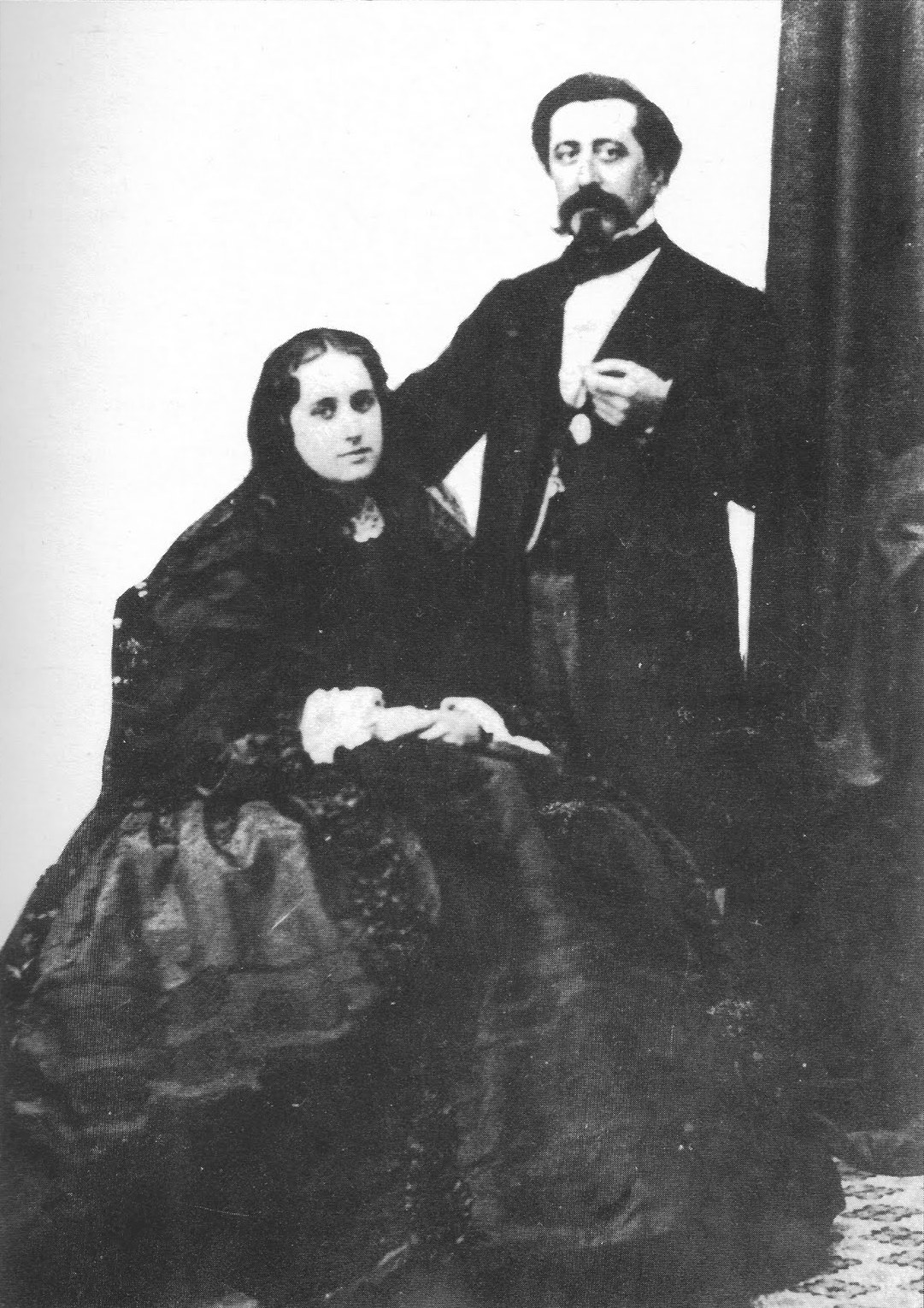
Fanny Garrido and Marcial del Adalida (1923)

She was the only daughter of the writer Francisca González Garrido (Fanny Garrido) and the musician Marcial del Adalida, who died when she was eight years old. The family residence was located in the manor house of Lóngora, in the Mariñas Coruñesas. It was for several years the center of the musical and literary life of A Coruña. Among the people who frequently visited Lóngora were the writers Emilia Pardo Bazán, Sofía Casanova, the painters Germán Taibo and Francisco Llorens Díaz, as well as Pan de Soraluce, Alfredo Tella, and Alejandro Pérez Lugín. Adalid spent her childhood in this cultural environment, receiving an artistic and musical education. Adalid studied at the Real Academia de Bellas Artes de San Fernando, specialising in composition and practising other genres such as landscape and portraiture.

== Career ==
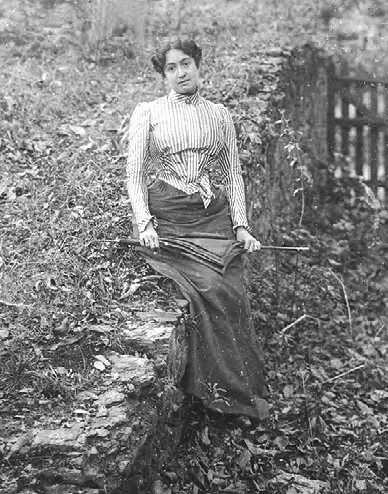
María del Adalid (1909)

She received honorable mentions at the National Exhibition of Fine Arts of 1904, 1906 and 1909. She participated in the Regional Art Exhibition of A Coruña in 1912, in the Galician Art Exhibition of A Coruña in 1917, and in the Galician Art Exhibition of Buenos Aires in 1919. She was also one of the first members —with number 47— of the Spanish Association of Painters and Sculptors (AEPE), founded in 1910.

On 12 December 1928, on the advice of Félix Estrada Catoyra, Adalid deposited her father's important library and archive (279 bound volumes and 2,729 registered musical pieces) in the Royal Galician Academy. In the words of historian Xosé Ramón Barreiro, it was "a unique and invaluable musical collection, more important than that of the National Library". She also donated the library of her grandfather (a military doctor), for which she was named an honorary academician of the Royal Galician Academy on 12 May 1929, the first person in that category.

== Personal life ==
She married José Ruiz de Huidobro, a doctor in Medicine and Pharmacy, on 19 July 1919, at the Monterreal Castle in Baiona.

== Death and legacy ==
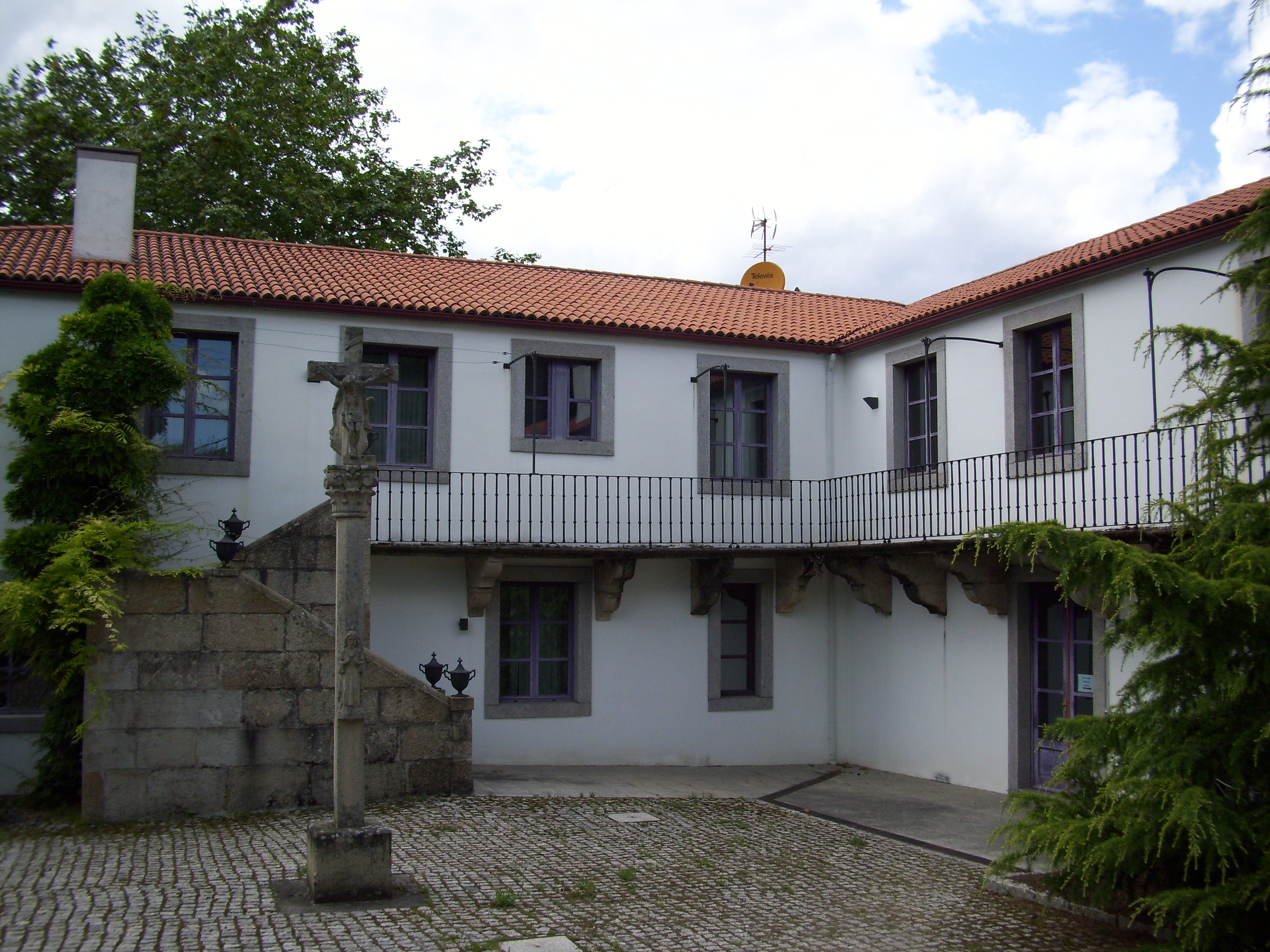
Lóngora manor

Maria del Adalid died at her home at number 26 Tabernas Street, in A Coruña, in 1930.

In March 1926, Adalid donated a piece of land she owned in Montrove for the creation of a school, which she helped to build and which bears her name.

Adalid bequeathed the family Lóngora manor to the Salesians to build a farm-school. Later, it became the property of the City Council of Oleiros and the headquarters of the University Institute of the Environment of the University of A Coruña.
