= Rocha Forte Castle =

Ruined fort in Galicia, Spain

Coordinates: 42.8609°N 8.5732°W

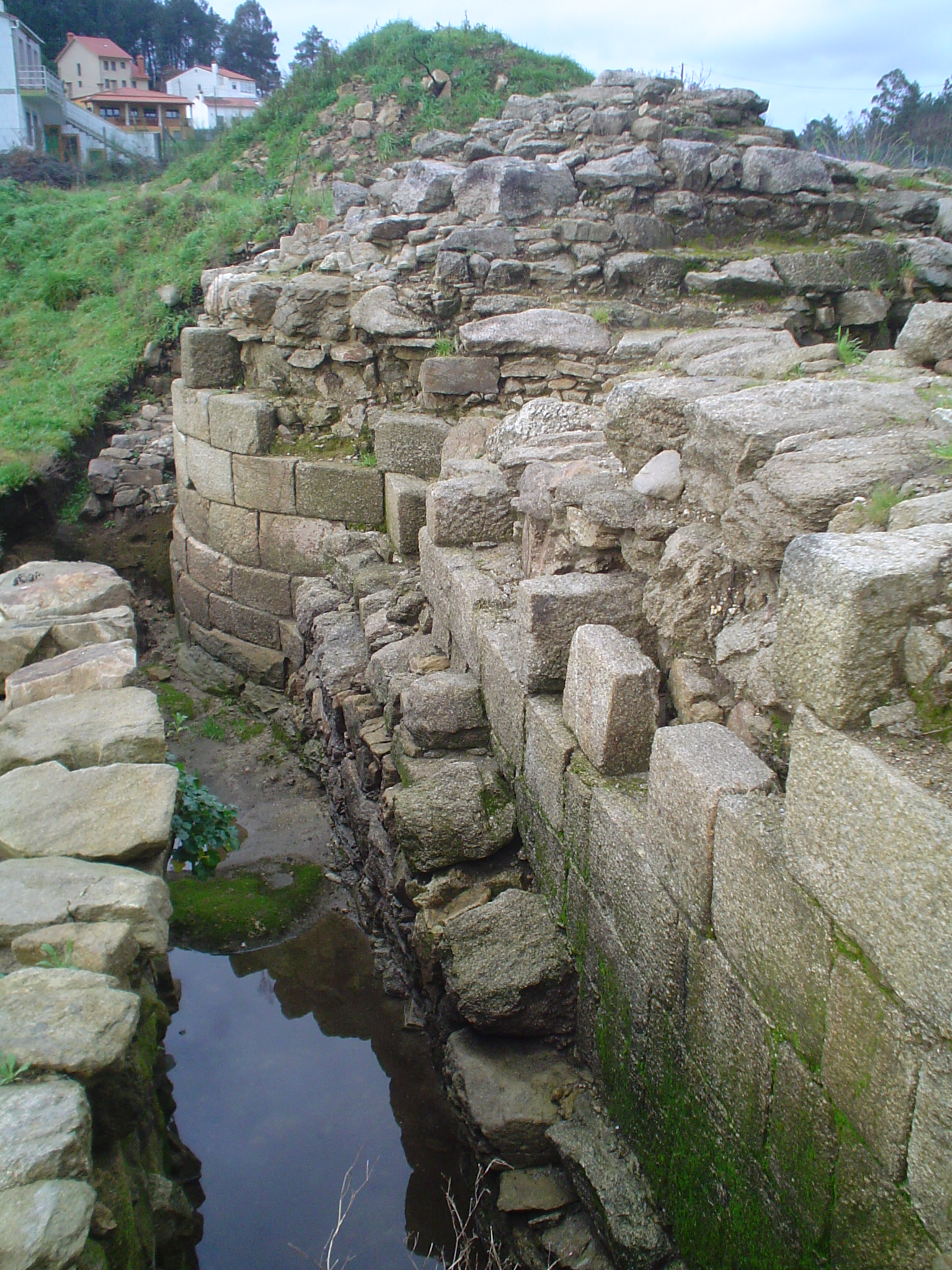
Ruins of the eastern wall

The Rocha Forte Castle is a ruined fort near Santiago de Compostela, in Galicia, Spain. It was first mentioned in written documents from 1253, but it had probably been built earlier.

The castle was situated in a strategic location by road from Padrón to Santiago, on the pilgrimage route from Portugal. The castle is not on top of a hill as many other forts are, but in a valley where it could control all of the traffic into town.

In addition to its purpose for defence, the castle was also a home for the Archbishop, which could provide the men of the local church a shelter from rioting citizens. In 1317, Berenguel de Landoira was nominated as Archbishop. The residents did not like him and started a rebellion. Archbishop Landoira had all the leaders of the rebellion executed. In the 15th century in Irmandiño wars the castle was damaged badly and it was abandoned. Later, in 1472 the walls were dismantled. During the Franco era the ruins were used as a hideout. In 1962, an electricity pylon was installed to the castle area.

== History ==
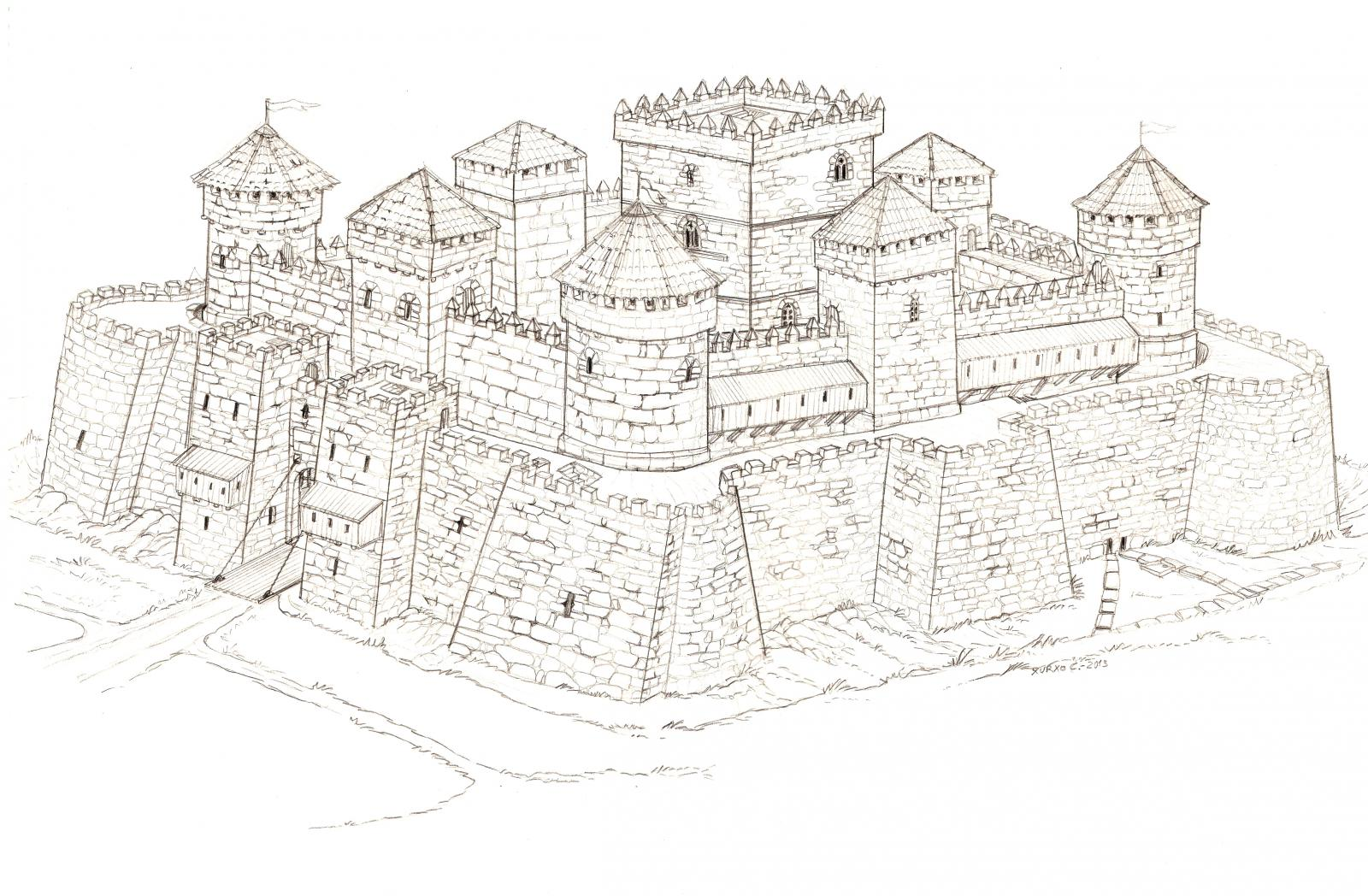
Possible castle reconstruction

The castle was built by Archbishop Juan Arias around 1240 and has since served as an archbishop's and cabildo's residence, witnessing much of the medieval history of Santiago. In the year 1255 appears the first documentary mention of the fortress in relation to the capitular constitutions of Juan Arias.

It also preserves the written testimony of the reconstruction carried out by Berenguel de Landoria after the ravages caused by the citizens of Compostela in 1320, in which it was the first documented confrontation of the many that took place between the town of Compostela and The Bishopric in those times. He was in charge of the uprising Alfonso Suárez de Deza, a personage of the Deza-Churruchaos family and butler of the son of Sancho IV de León and Castile, the infant Felipe. These clashes were collected in the document "Acts of Don Berenguel de Landoria" in which it is narrated how on the day of the purification the citizens of Compostela attacked and burned the castle, having to be raised again by the archbishop.

It also underwent substantive modifications mandated by the southern archbishop Lope de Mendoza.

== Current status ==
Since 2001, a series of archaeological excavations have been carried out, thanks to an agreement between the City Council of Santiago and the University of Santiago de Compostela, in order to recover the deposit and consolidate it by means of the creation of an Archaeological Park.
