= Pedro Madruga =

Galician noble and knight

Pedro Álvarez de Soutomaior
- Count of Caminha; Viscount of Tui
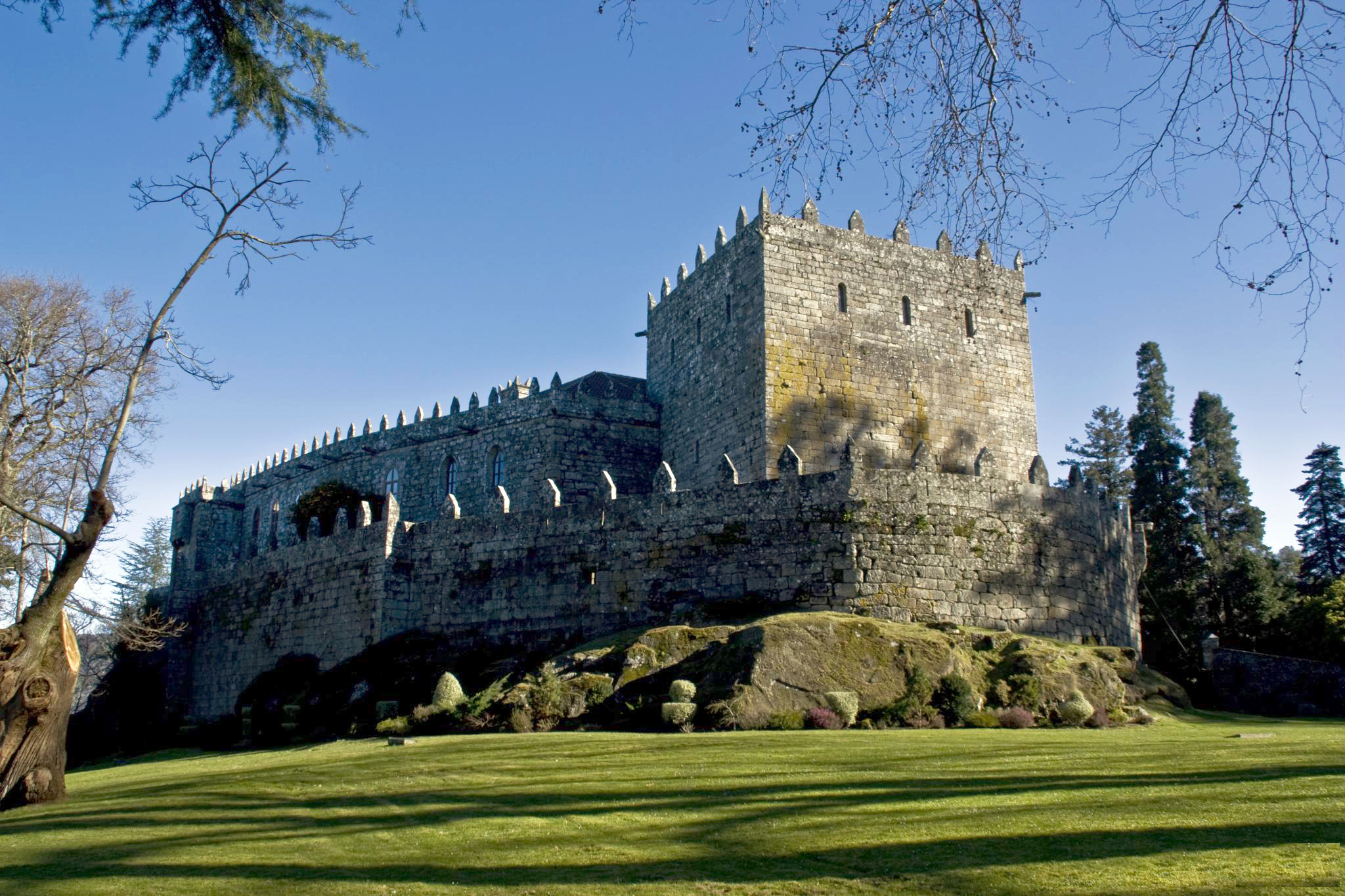
- Soutomaior Castle, the ancestral home of Pedro Madruga
- Full name: Pedro Álvarez de Soutomaior
- Born: c. 1430; Pontevedra, Galicia
- Died: 1486; Alba de Tormes, Castile
- Residence: Soutomaior Castle
- Wars and battles: Irmandiño revolts War of the Castilian Succession
- Spouse: Teresa de Távora
- Father: Fernán Eanes de Soutomaior
- Mother: Constança Gonçalves (?)

Pedro Álvarez de Soutomaior (c. 1430– 1486), known by the sobriquet Pedro Madruga, was a Galician nobleman and knight. He was a notable figure in Galicia where he exerted certain influence in the Portuguese court, as well as spending time in that of Castile. He was one of the leading lords who suppressed the Irmandiño peasant revolts in the 1460s, and also fought in favor of the Portuguese-backed claimant to the Castilian throne, Joanna la Beltraneja, in the War of the Castilian Succession.

== Family ==
Pedro was the illegitimate son of Fernán Eanes de Soutomaior; his mother has never been identified for certain. When Fernán died, his estates passed to his legitimate son, Alvaro. However, Alvaro died whilst still unmarried, and although the next legal heir was Alvaro's aunt, provision was made with her agreement to allow Pedro to inherit the estates instead. He was subsequently legitimised by the sovereigns of Castile and Portugal, and became Don Pedro Álvarez de Soutomaior. He married Teresa de Távora, who came from a noble Portuguese family. His children included Cristóbal de Soutomaior, who would sail with Diego Columbus (eldest son of Christopher Columbus) to the West Indies. Cristóbal would become governor of Puerto Rico.

Pedro's ancestral home was Soutomaior Castle, although he also resided for periods of his life in the courts of Castile and Portugal.

== Nickname ==
Pedro Álvarez de Soutomaior acquired the epithet "Madruga" because he would "rise early" (Spanish: madrugar) in the morning. According to legend he first gained the nickname as a result of a dispute with the Count of Ribadavia concerning the boundaries of their respective lands. To settle the dispute the two men agreed to rise at the first cockcrow, mount their horses, and ride toward each other's castle. Their meeting point would mark the new boundary. Instead of waiting until dawn Pedro Álvarez decided that first cockcrow was at midnight, and so rode through the night until he reached his rival's castle. When the Count emerged on hearing the dawn cockcrow, he found don Pedro standing at his door, and exclaimed "Madrugas Pedro, madrugas!" (You're an early riser, Pedro; An early riser!).

== Career ==
Pedro Madruga was a figure in the court of Henry IV of Castile, and the king entrusted him with the role of keeping the powerful Bishop of Santiago de Compostela, Alonso de Fonseca, under control.

In the 1460s the second Irmandiño revolt erupted in Galicia when the peasantry rebelled against the regional nobility. Pedro Madruga had already sought refuge in Portugal. At the request of the nobles, he raised an army and confronted the Irmandiños on several occasions until he finally managed to subdue them.

During the War of the Castilian Succession in the 1470s he was a supporter of Joanna la Beltraneja (daughter of Henry IV) against the claims of Isabella I and Ferdinand II.

== Reputation ==
Pedro Madruga's reputation is that of "a turbulent magnate who plowed a deep furrow in Galicia's troubled fifteenth century". Nevertheless, he was a popular figure in Galicia and was commemorated with the following lines:

Long live the palm, long live the flower
Long live Pedro Madruga
Pedro Madruga de Soutomaior.

== Columbus-Madruga theory ==
In the late 19th century the Spanish writer García de la Riega proposed the theory that Christopher Columbus was of Galician origin. Although briefly popular, the theory had fallen out of favour by the late 20th century. However, in recent years it has been proposed that Pedro Madruga and Christopher Columbus were the same person. According to this theory, Madruga did not die in 1486 but changed his identity to disguise a pact between his former enemies, the Catholic Monarchs, and himself. This thesis is based on several lines of evidence: such as Columbus naming coastal features of the West Indies with the names of more than 100 localities of the Pontevedra estuary (near Soutomaior in Galicia); and the similarity of the handwriting of Columbus and Pedro Madruga. One argument against is a will drafted in 1491 by Alvaro de Soutomaior, eldest son of Pedro Madruga. In this document, Alvaro stipulates that "the bones of my parents [...] be brought to be interred in the chapel of S. Obispo D. Juan in the Tui Cathedral," although this document implies that Pedro Madruga was dead in 1491 rather than 1486.

== Titles ==
- 1st Count of Caminha
- Viscount of Tui
- Marshall of Baiona
- Lord of Crecente
- Lord of Fornelos
