= Fanny Garrido =

Galician writer and translator

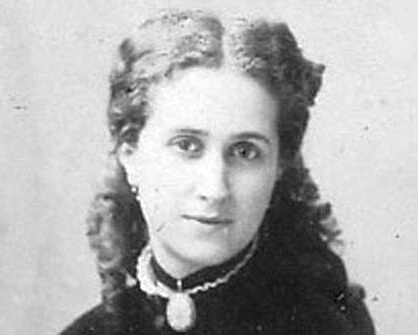
- Born: Francisca González Garrido; 1 September 1846; A Coruña, Spain
- Died: 11 September 1917 (aged 71); Liáns, Oleiros, Spain
- Other name: Eulalia de Liáns
- Occupations: Writer, translator
- Notable work: Escaramuzas
- Spouses: Marcial del Adalid; José Rodríguez Mourelo
- Children: María del Adalid

Francisca González Garrido (1 September 1846 – 11 September 1917), better known as Fanny Garrido, was a Galician writer and translator.

== Biography ==
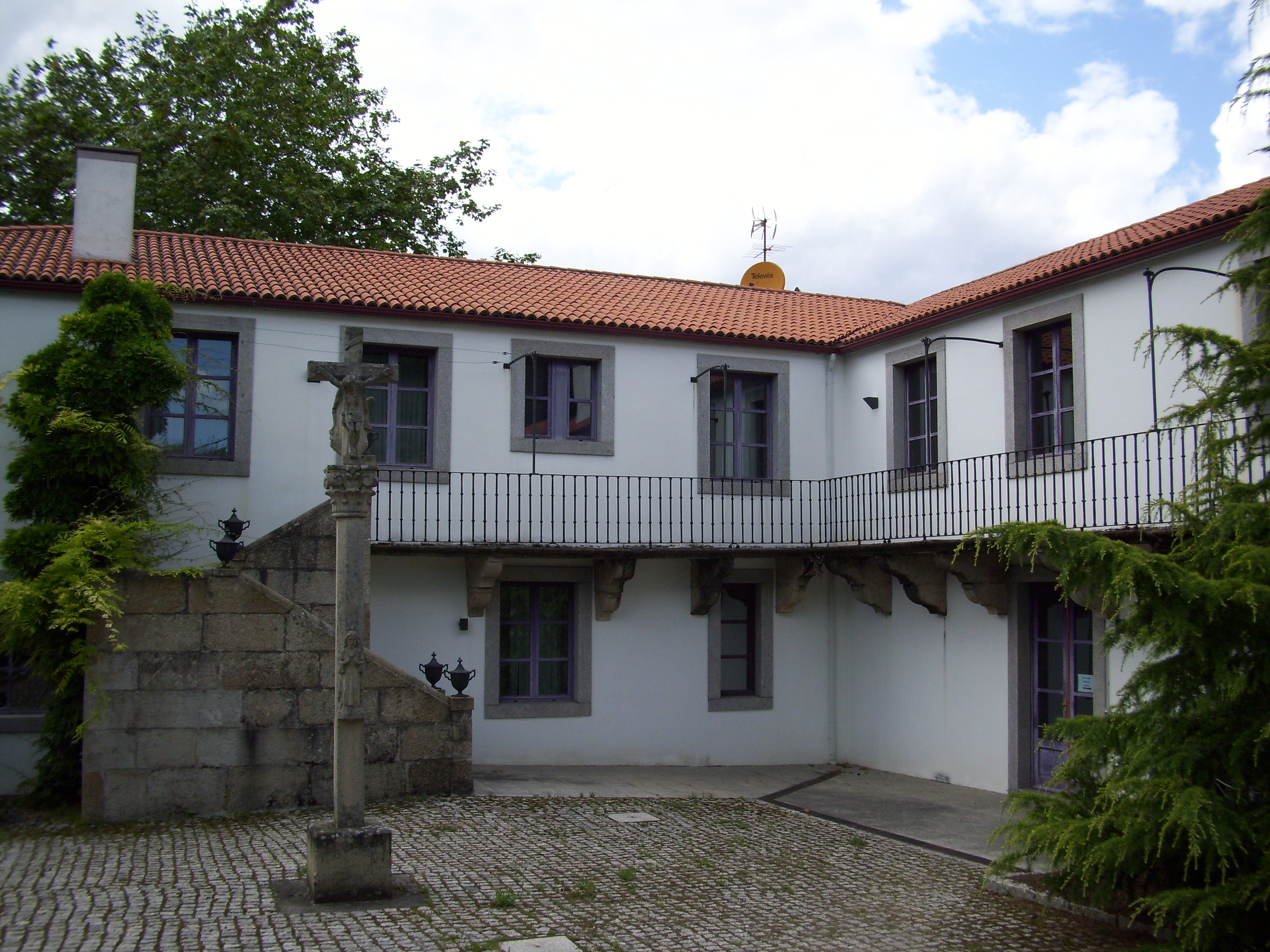
Patio del Pazo de Lóngora, residence of Fanny Garrido, now home to the Environmental Institute of the University of A Coruña

Fanny Garrido was born in A Coruña in 1846, to military doctor Francisco González Garrido del Amo and Josefa García Cuenca. She married the composer Marcial del Adalid, who set many of her poems to music. In 1873 she gave birth to their daughter, María del Adalid, who became a painter. After the death of her husband, Garrido married Lugo chemist José Rodríguez Mourelo.

She contributed to the Madrid newspapers Galicia and El Correo, writing under the pseudonym Eulalia de Liáns. The most notable of her works is the autobiographical novel Escaramuzas, published in 1885, which she dedicated to her friend Emilia Pardo Bazán (with whom she co-founded the Galician Folklore Society in 1884). She was also a translator of the German poets Heinrich Heine and Johann Wolfgang von Goethe.

== Honors ==
Fanny Garrido was a correspondent of the Royal Galician Academy.

In December 1971, a street was named for her in her home city of A Coruña.

== Works ==
- Escaramuzas, 1885
- La madre de Paco Pardo, 1898
- Batallas (unpublished)
