= José Francisco Pérez Martínez =

Spanish landscape painter (1907–1985)

- Born: 1907
- Died: 1985 (aged 77–78)
- Citizenship: Spanish
- Occupation: landscape painter

José Francisco Pérez Martínez (1907–1985) was a Spanish landscape painter known for his impressionist depictions of Galicia, particularly rivers and coastal towns which are claimed to be an important part of Galician artistic heritage. His work is noted for its contribution to the regional development of Spanish landscape painting.

In 1946, he began exhibiting under the signature "José Francisco," and remained active until his death in 1985. His paintings, influenced by Francisco Llorens and Manuel Abelenda, have been included in several regional exhibitions, including the Autumn Salons, and are held in museums in A Coruña and Lugo, as well as other institutional collections. The Provincial Council of La Coruña awarded him the Special Landscape Prize in 1962 and 1963.

In addition to his artistic career, Pérez Martínez ran a family business, El Capricho, and taught foreign languages for commercial use.

He was married to the painter Dolores (known professionally as Lola Artamendi) and has two sons, Francisco José Pérez González and Rafael Alberto Pérez González, as well as four grandchildren: Dolores, Pancho, Emma, and Alejandro Pérez Ferrant.
