= Soutomaior =

Municipality in Galicia, Spain

Coordinates: 42.333°N 8.567°W

- Municipality
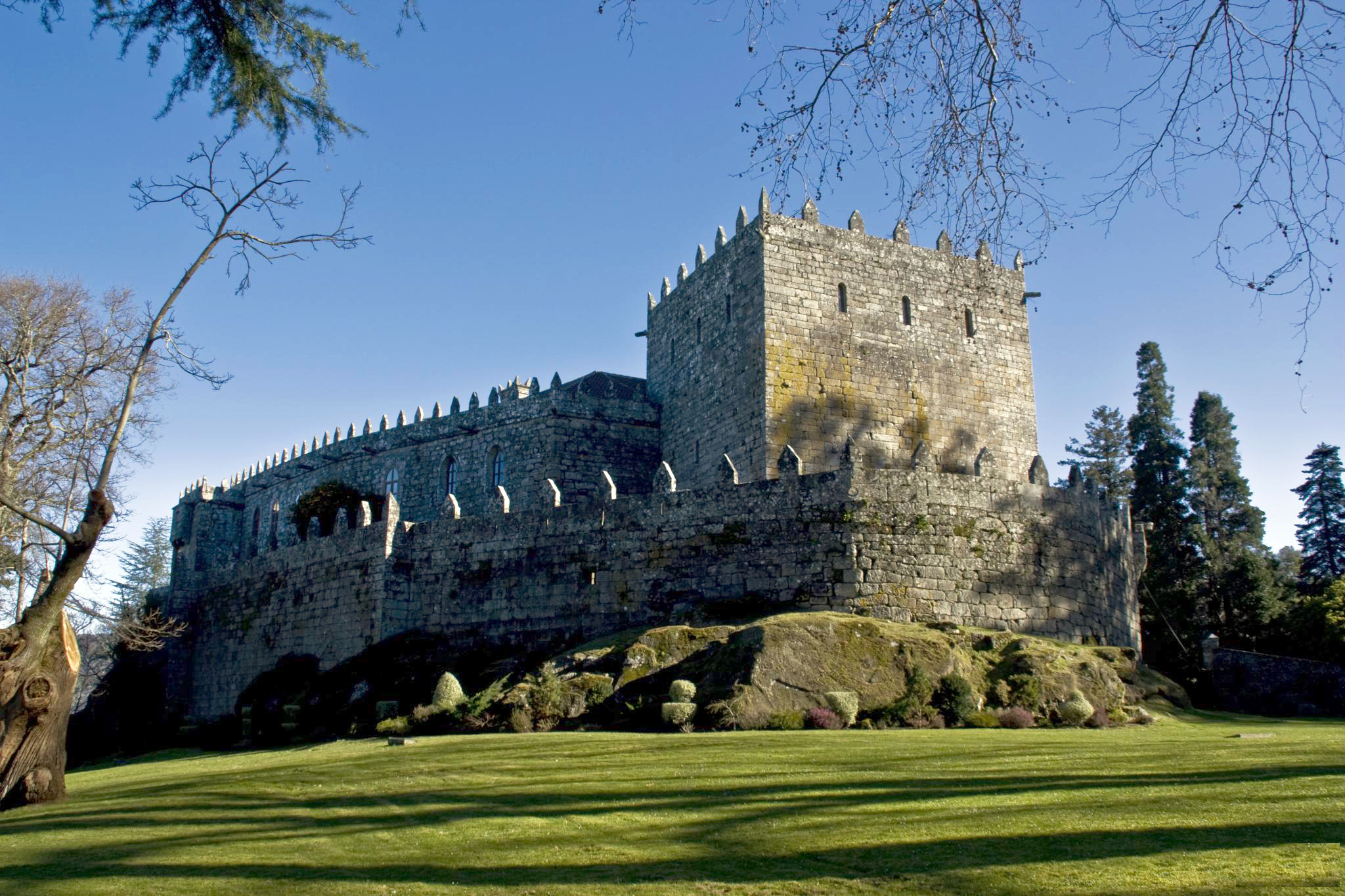
- Castle of Soutomaior

- Flag Coat of arms
- Interactive map of Soutomaior
- Parroquias: Santiago de Arcade, San Salvador de Soutomaior

Government
  - Alcalde (Mayor): Agustín Reguera Ocampo

Population (2025-01-01)
  - Total: 7,589
- Time zone: UTC+1 (CET)
  - Summer (DST): UTC+2 (CET)
- Website: www.soutomaior.com

Soutomaior is a municipality in the province of Pontevedra, in the autonomous community of Galicia, Spain. It belongs to the comarca of Vigo. According to the INE, the population in 2011 was 7,223 inhabitants.

== See also ==
- List of municipalities in Pontevedra
