= Manuel de Adalid y Gamero =

Honduran composer and conductor

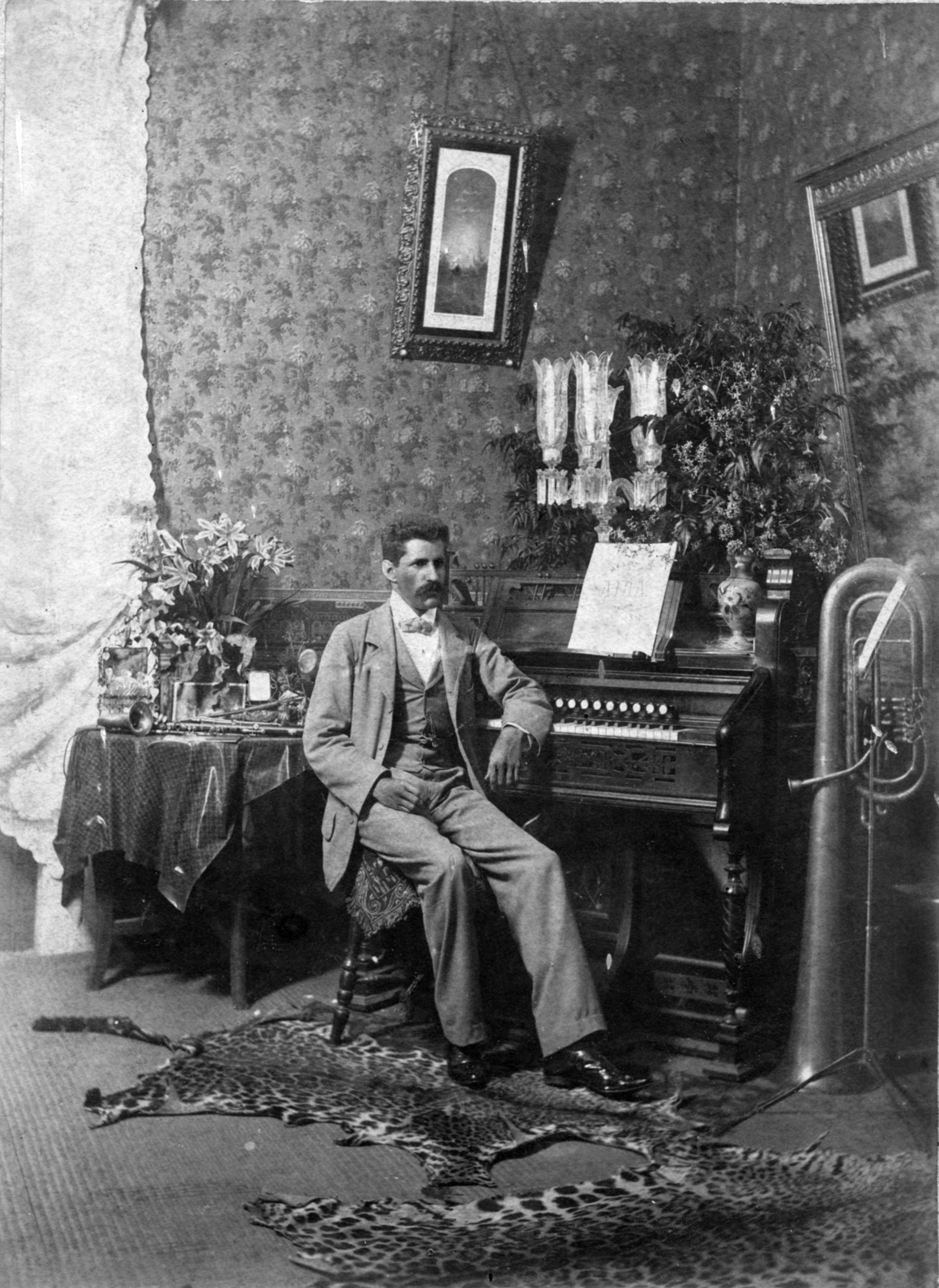
Manuel de Adalid y Gamero

Manuel de Adalid y Gamero (February 8, 1872 – March 29, 1947) was a Honduran composer. A native of Danlí, he also was an organist and conductor. He composed mainly musical miniatures, such as waltzes, mazurkas, and polkas. Later in his life he became a citizen of the United States. His papers, including much music in autograph score, may today be found at Tulane University. He died in Tegucigalpa, Honduras on March 29, 1947. His final resting place can be found in his native city of Danli, in the old cemetery.
