= Marcial del Adalid y Gurréa =

Spanish composer (1826–1881)

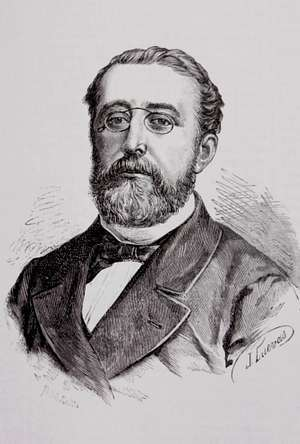
- Born: 24 August 1826; A Coruña, Spain
- Died: 16 October 1881 (aged 55); A Coruña, Spain
- Occupation: Composer
- Spouse: Fanny Garrido
- Children: María del Adalid

Marcial del Adalid y Gurréa (24 August 1826 – 16 October 1881) was a Spanish composer. He studied music in London between 1840 and 1844 with Ignaz Moscheles and it is possible that he also studied with Chopin in Paris. Both men influenced the style and form of his musical compositions. After finishing his studies, Adalid y Gurréa returned to Spain where he lived in A Coruña and later Madrid. Highly influenced by lieder, his most important compositions were vocal art songs and songs for the piano. A particularly fine example of his work is his 1877 composition Cantares nuevos y viejos de Galicia where he successfully blended the folklore of Galicia with the technique and spirit of Romantic piano music. He also composed one opera Inese e Bianca, which was never staged. In addition to composing, Adalid y Gurréa spent much of his time teaching music courses and organizing music competitions.

He was married to writer Fanny Garrido and the father of painter María del Adalid.

== Sources ==
- López-Calo, José. The New Grove Dictionary of Opera, edited by Stanley Sadie (1992). ISBN 0-333-73432-7 and ISBN 1-56159-228-5
