= Monterreal Castle =

Coordinates: 42°7′29.82″N 8°50′59.18″W

- Castillo de Monterreal
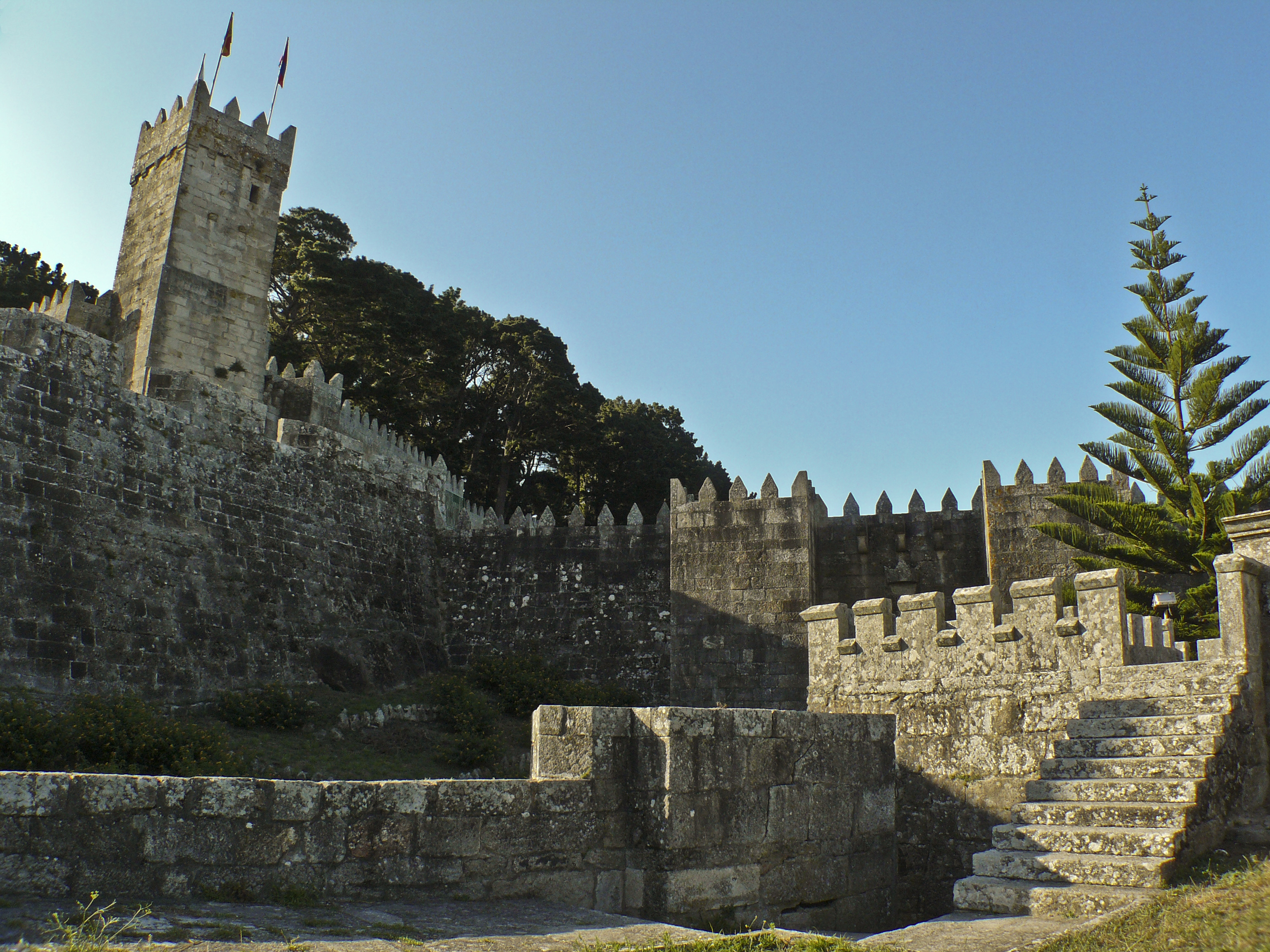
- Fortifications at Monterreal Castle
- Alternative names: Parador de Baiona
- Hotel chain: Paradores

General information
- Location: Baiona (Pontevedra), Spain

Website
- Parador de Baiona

Monterreal Castle is a castle in Baiona (Pontevedra), Spain. Construction began in the 12th century and was completed in the 16th century. It now serves as a tourist attraction and houses a Parador hotel.

Three of the castle's towers are preserved: the Reloj tower, the Tenaza tower with a heptagonal base and the Príncipe tower. The Castle is defended by the Puerta del Sol, a ramp with a lifting bridge and the three large towers.

The first appearance of the castle in record dates from the year 60, when Julius Caesar conquered Baiona. Apart from the Romans, the Visigoths and Muslims also left their marks in the Monterreal Castle, whose name was given by the Catholic Monarchs.
