= Francisco Llorens Díaz =

Spanish-Galician painter

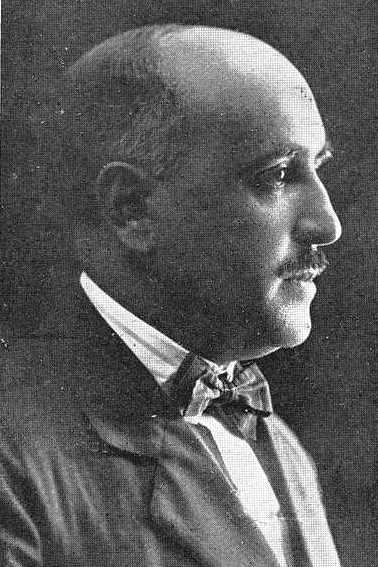
Francisco Llorens (1922)

Francisco Llorens Díaz (10 April 1874, La Coruña - 11 February 1948, Madrid) was a Spanish-Galician painter; best known for still-lifes and landscapes.

== Biography ==
He was born to a family of merchants. While obtaining a commercial education, he began taking classes in drawing at the School of Arts and Crafts in La Coruña, where his teacher was the military artist, Román Navarro. This led him to choose painting over business as a career, so he moved to Madrid and enrolled at the Real Academia de Bellas Artes de San Fernando and studied with Carlos de Haes. He completed his initial training in the workshops of Joaquín Sorolla.

The Grotto of the Seagulls

Thanks to a grant, he was able to attend the Spanish Academy in Rome, as well as traveling to Belgium and the Netherlands, together with a group of his fellow students. This included several months of intense study in Bruges, a city which made a great impression on him. Three of the works he created in Rome were acquired by the Spanish ambassador for display in the Quirinal Palace. He returned to Spain in 1906.

Over the next two decades, he participated in numerous exhibitions; notably a showing in 1917 at the Second Exposition of Galician Art and, that same year, at the Galerías Layetanas in Barcelona, jointly with his friend, Fernando Álvarez de Sotomayor. He also had showings at exhibitions in Panama and Buenos Aires, but never actually visited America. At the National Exhibition of Fine Arts of 1922, he was awarded a First Class prize for his landscape, "Rías Baixas". In 1929, he was commissioned to organize the Galician pavilion at the Ibero-American Exposition.

In 1918, he married Eva Rodríguez; daughter of a prominent physician in La Coruña. She died in 1925, leaving him with two daughters. Shortly after, he was awarded the Grand Cross of the Order of Charles III.

Rías Baixas

During the Spanish Civil War, he remained in Madrid until 1938, when he and his daughters fled to Valencia with the Republican army. There, he devoted himself to painting still-lifes. After the war, he divided his time between Madrid and Galicia, where he created landscapes. In 1942, he was named an Academician at his alma mater, the Real Academia. The following year, he received similar honors at the Real Academia Gallega.

In 1945, his health began to decline, and he suffered from episodes of severe memory loss. He died in 1948, and was buried next to his wife.

In 1972, a major retrospective was presented in Madrid, followed by exhibitions in La Coruña and Vigo. His works may be seen in numerous museums and collections throughout Galicia, including the Museo Provincial de Lugo, Museo de Bellas Artes de La Coruña, Museo de Pontevedra and the Museo Quiñones de León. The Museo del Prado possesses eight of his works.
