= Irmandiño revolts =

Military conflict

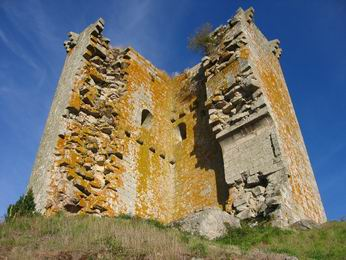
Castle of Sandiás, destroyed by the Irmandiños in 1467

The Irmandiño revolts (or Irmandiño Wars) were two revolts that took place in the 15th-century Kingdom of Galicia against attempts by the regional nobility to maintain their rights over the peasantry and the bourgeoisie. The revolts were also part of the larger phenomenon of popular revolts in late medieval Europe caused by the general economic and demographic crises in Europe during the 14th and 15th centuries. Similar rebellions broke out in the Hispanic Kingdoms, including the War of the Remences in Catalonia and the foráneo revolts in the Balearic Islands.

== Background ==
Despite being joined to the Crown of Castile with the political union of the Kingdoms of León, Galiza and Castile in 1230 (Treaty of Benavente), the Kingdom of Galicia maintained unique features, characterized by an economy which depended heavily on agriculture, Atlantic trade and a society marked by enormous feudal power that was concentrated in both secular and ecclesiastical lords. In addition, Galicia was isolated from the rest of the crown due to its mountainous borders and geographical location, a situation which the Galician nobility reinforced politically. These lords—the Osorios in Monforte de Lemos and Sarria, the Andrade in Pontedeume, and the Moscosos in Vimianzo, among others—held excessive power, with which they abused the general rural population. This resentment triggered two uprisings: the Irmandade Fusquenlla (the Fusquenlla Brotherhood) of 1431–1435 and the Grande Guerra Irmandiña ("Great Brotherhood War") of 1467–1469. (The irmandade here should not be confused with the hermandades, who were a constabulary.) Although ultimately unsuccessful, the rebels lay the groundwork for the incorporation of Galicia into the direct administrative control of the Spanish crown, which the Catholic Monarchs were beginning to establish.

== First revolt ==
The Irmandade Fusquenlla was formed in 1431 on the estates of the lords of Andrade in reaction to harsh treatment by pt:Nuno Freire de Andrade, "the Bad." The revolt broke out in Pontedeume and Betanzos and spread to the bishoprics of Lugo, Mondoñedo, and Santiago de Compostela. It was led by a fidalgo of low status, Roi Xordo of A Coruña, who died in the reprisals after the revolt was suppressed in 1435.

== Second revolt ==
The Great Irmandiño War (Galician: Gran Guerra Irmandiña) broke out in 1467, but Alonso de Lanzós had begun forming a "general brotherhood" (irmandade xeral) a few years earlier with the backing of Henry IV and various municipal councils of A Coruña, Betanzos, Ferrol, and Lugo. During the war, the municipal councils became primary actors, giving the conflict the characteristics of a true civil war rather than just a revolt, as had occurred three decades earlier.

Several years of bad crops and plagues provoked the popular revolt. According to testimony from trials after the revolt, the Irmandiños counted some 80,000 troops. Several social classes participated in the organization and direction of the rebellion: peasants, city dwellers, the lesser nobility, and even some members of the clergy (some in the church hierarchy financially supported the Irmandiños). Leading the revolt were fidalgos. Pedro de Osório led the armies in central Galicia, especially the Compostela region. Alonso de Lanzós directed the war in the north of Galicia, and Diego de Lemos in the southern part of the Province of Lugo and in the north of the Province of Ourense. The presence of an "avenging and anti-lord mentality" in medieval Galicia, which portrayed the great lords as "evildoers," made the Irmandiño Wars possible.

Opposed to the Irmandiños were the higher nobles, who had castles and forts, and the heads of the principal churches and monasteries. The Irmandiños destroyed about 130 castles and forts during the two years of war. The Lemos, Andrade, and Moscoso families were the main targets of the rebels, who spared the ecclesiastical authorities. At the start of the war, the nobility fled to Portugal or the Castile, but in 1469 Pedro Madruga began a counter-campaign from Portugal with the backing of other nobles, the kings of Castile and Portugal, and the armed forces of the archbishop of Santiago de Compostela. The nobles' army, which had better equipment, such as the latest arquebuses, took advantage of divisions within the Irmandiño movement and defeated them. The leaders of the rebellion were arrested and executed.

== Aftermath ==
The Irmandiño revolts paved the way for the centralization efforts of the Catholic Monarchs two decades later. They appointed a governor-captain general and created an audiencia for the Kingdom of Galicia that took over the dispensation of justice from local lords and placed it under the auspices of the Crown. They also ordered that none of the castles destroyed by the Irmandiños be rebuilt and had the Galician monasteries placed under the authority of their respective Castilian orders. The Catholic Monarchs also eliminated or neutralized the powerful lords. In particular, it is possible that they had Pedro Madruga—who remained grateful to the king of Portugal and, therefore, supported Xoana A Bertranaxa in her efforts to gain the crown of Castile against Isabella—murdered in 1486. (The other possibility, depending on the chronicle, is that he died of carbuncles.) Another powerful lord, Pedro Pardo de Cela, was executed and his lands incorporated into the royal domain. Finally, Ferdinand and Isabella extended the authority of the Santa Hermandad to Galicia and abolished any remnants of serfdom in the region in 1480.

== Current commemoration ==
Every year a large-scale role-playing event, "Irmandiños A Revolta," is financed by the Xunta de Galicia to promote historical reenactment. In past years up to 800 people have participated, making it the largest role-playing event in the world.

== Bibliography ==
- Devia, Cecilia (2009). La violencia en la Edad Media: la rebelión irmandiña. Biblioteca de Escrituras Profanas, 18 (in Spanish). Vigo: Academia del Hispanismo. ISBN 978-84-96915-49-7.
- MacKay, Angus (1977). Spain in the Middle Ages: From Frontier to Empire, 1000–1500. New York: St. Martin's Press. ISBN 0-312-74978-3.
- Payne, Stanley G. (1973). A History of Spain and Portugal. Vol. 1. Madison: University of Wisconsin Press. ISBN 0-299-06270-8.
- Vicens Vives, Jaime (1967). Approaches to the History of Spain. Berkeley: University of California Press.
