= List of municipalities in Ourense =

Map of Spain with the province of Ourense highlighted

This is a list of the municipalities in the province of Ourense in the autonomous community of Galicia, Spain.

The Galician name is the sole official Older or informal texts may use Castilian forms or spellings.

Name	Pop. (2009)
Allariz	5,821
Amoeiro	2,327
A Arnoia	1,103
Avión	2,610
Baltar	1,144
Bande	2,116
Baños de Molgas	1,846
Barbadás	9,177
O Barco de Valdeorras	14,213
Beade	521
Beariz	1,319
Os Blancos	1,030
Boborás	3,001
A Bola	1,486
O Bolo	1,139
Calvos de Randín	1,093
Carballeda de Avia	1,546
Carballeda de Valdeorras	1,870
O Carballiño	14,114
Cartelle	3,387
Castrelo de Miño	1,928
Castrelo do Val	1,241
Castro Caldelas	1,594
Celanova	6,020
Cenlle	1,431
Coles	3,214
Cortegada	1,344
Cualedro	2,049
Chandrexa de Queixa	679
Entrimo	1,367
Esgos	1,234
Gomesende	1,018
A Gudiña	1,584
O Irixo	1,828
Larouco	581
Laza	1,597
Leiro	1,793
Lobeira	1,016
Lobios	2,259
Maceda	3,139
Manzaneda	1,028
Maside	3,093
Melón	1,498
A Merca	2,254
A Mezquita	1,365
Montederramo	990
Monterrei	3,036
Muíños	1,821
Nogueira de Ramuín	2,435
Oímbra	1,915
Ourense	107,742
Paderne de Allariz	1,597
Padrenda	2,367
Parada de Sil	683
O Pereiro de Aguiar	6,135
A Peroxa	2,303
Petín	1,030
Piñor	1,401
A Pobra de Trives	2,549
Pontedeva	680
Porqueira	1,103
Punxín	861
Quintela de Leirado	754
Rairiz de Veiga	1,697
Ramirás	1,938
Ribadavia	5,519
Riós	1,907
A Rúa	4,816
Rubiá	1,585
San Amaro	1,289
San Cibrao das Viñas	4,310
San Cristovo de Cea	2,739
San Xoán de Río	759
Sandiás	1,466
Sarreaus	1,587
Taboadela	1,697
A Teixeira	479
Toén	2,635
Trasmiras	1,656
A Veiga	1,106
Verea	1,269
Verín	14,391
Viana do Bolo	3,382
Vilamarín	2,215
Vilamartín de Valdeorras	2,164
Vilar de Barrio	1,686
Vilar de Santos	991
Vilardevós	2,324
Vilariño de Conso	700
Xinzo de Limia	10,161
Xunqueira de Ambía	1,789
Xunqueira de Espadanedo	962

== See also ==
- Geography of Spain
- List of cities in Spain
