= Valle del Miño-Ourense =

Spanish geographical indication for wine

Val do Miño-Ourense VdlT
- Wine region
- Val do Miño-Ourense VdlT in the province of Ourense in the region of Galicia
- Type: Vino de la Tierra
- Country: Spain

Valle del Miño-Ourense (or in Galician, Val do Miño-Ourense) is a Spanish geographical indication for Vino de la Tierra wines located in the autonomous region of Galicia. Vino de la Tierra is one step below the mainstream Denominación de Origen indication on the Spanish wine quality ladder.

The area covered by this geographical indication includes the municipalities of O Pereiro de Aguiar; Coles; Ourense; Barbadás; Toén; and San Cibrao das Viñas (located in the province of Ourense, in Galicia, Spain).

It acquired its Vino de la Tierra status in 2001.

== Grape varieties ==
- Red: Mencía, Caíño, Mouratón, Sousón, Cabernet franc, Garnacha tintorera and Bracellao
- White: Palomino, Treixadura, Torrontés, Albariño, Loureiro, Riesling, Doña Blanca and Godello
