= Ourense (disambiguation) =

Ourense is a municipality in Galicia, Spain.

Ourense may also refer to:

== Places ==
- Ourense (comarca), a comarca in the province of Ourense, Galicia, Spain.
- Ourense (Spanish Congress Electoral District), one of the 52 electoral districts (circunscripciones) used for the Spanish Congress of Deputies - the lower chamber of the Spanish Parliament, the Cortes Generales.
- Ourense (Congress of Deputies constituency)
- Ourense Cathedral, a cathedral in Ourense
- Province of Ourense, a province of Galicia, Spain.
- Roman Catholic Diocese of Ourense, one of the five Catholic dioceses of Galicia, Spain.

== Sports ==
- CD Ourense, a football team based in Ourense, Galicia, Spain.
- CD Ourense B, a football team reserve team of CD Ourense.
- Club Ourense Baloncesto, a basketball team based in Ourense, Galicia.
- Ourense FS, a futsal club based in Ourense, city of the province of Ourense, Galicia, Spain.

== Other ==
- Ourense Torcs, a pair of Iron Age artifacts found in Ourense

== See also ==
- Orense (disambiguation)
