= Orense =

Orense may refer to:

- Ourense, a city in northwestern Spain, named Orense in Spanish
  - Province of Ourense, a province in northwestern Spain
  - Valle del Miño-Orense, a wine region in northwestern Spain
- Orense S.C., an Ecuadorian association football club
- Orense Street, a street in Makati, Philippines

== See also ==
- Ourense (disambiguation)
