= Amoeiro =

Municipality in Galicia, Spain

- Municipality
- Coat of arms

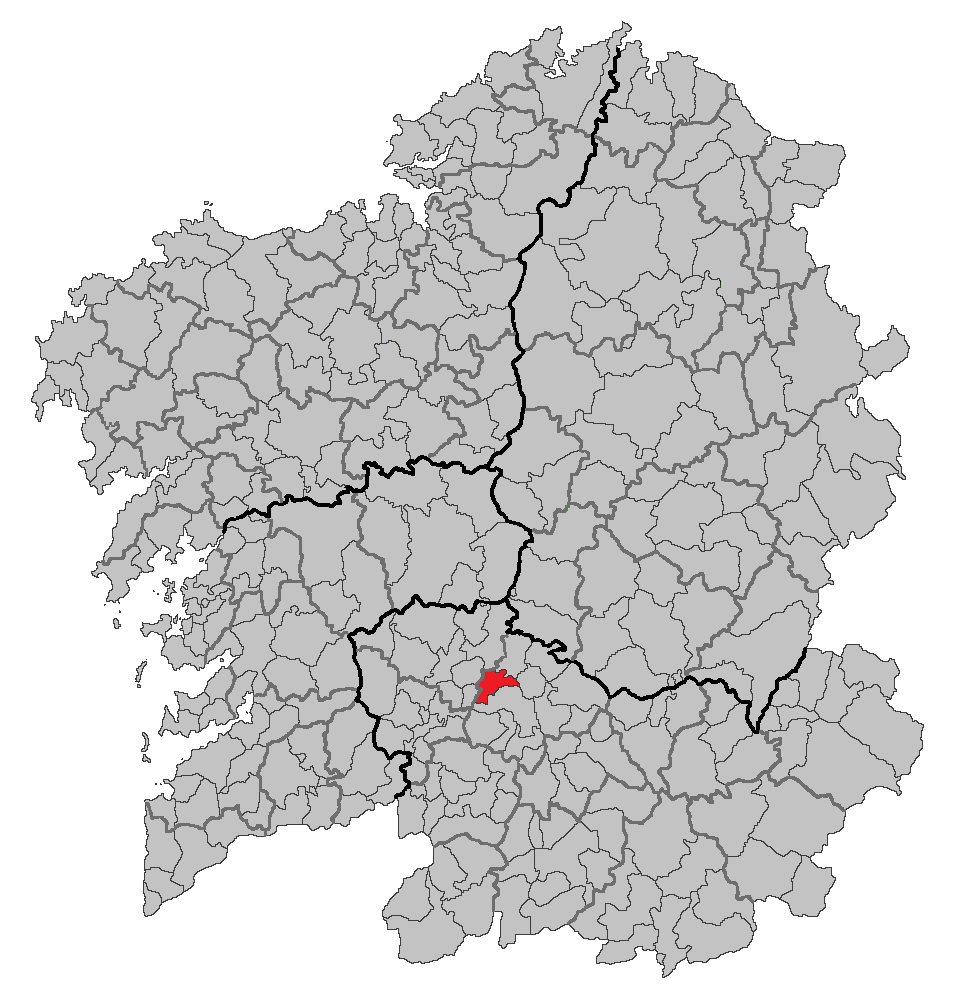
- Situation of Amoeiro within Galicia

- Location in Spain
- Coordinates: 42°24′36″N 7°57′12″W
- Country: Spain
- Autonomous community: Galicia
- Province: Ourense
- Comarca: Ourense

Government
  - Alcalde (Mayor): José Luis González López (PSdeG-PSOE)

Area
  - Total: 39.7 km^{2} (15.3 sq mi)

Population (2025-01-01)
  - Total: 2,443
  - Density: 61.5/km^{2} (159/sq mi)
- Time zone: UTC+1 (CET)
  - Summer (DST): UTC+2 (CET)
- INE municipality code: 32002

Amoeiro is a municipality in the province of Ourense, in the autonomous community of Galicia, Spain. It belongs to the comarca of Ourense. It connects borders the municipalities of San Cristovo de Cea, Vilamarín, Coles, Ourense, Punxín and Maside. In 2016, it had a population of 2264 inhabitants.
