= Caldelas =

Caldelas may refer to:

- Caldelas (Amares), a former parish in Amares Municipality, Portugal
- Caldas das Taipas, a parish in Guimarães Municipality, Portugal
- Castro Caldelas, a municipality in the province of Ourense, Galicia, Spain
- Ponte Caldelas, a municipality in the province of Pontevedra, Galicia, Spain
- Terra de Caldelas, a comarca in the province of Ourense, Galicia, Spain
