= Monastery of Santa Cristina de Ribas de Sil =

Monastery in Galicia, Spain

Coordinates: 42°23′45″N 7°35′18″W

- Mosteiro de Santa Cristina de Ribas de Sil
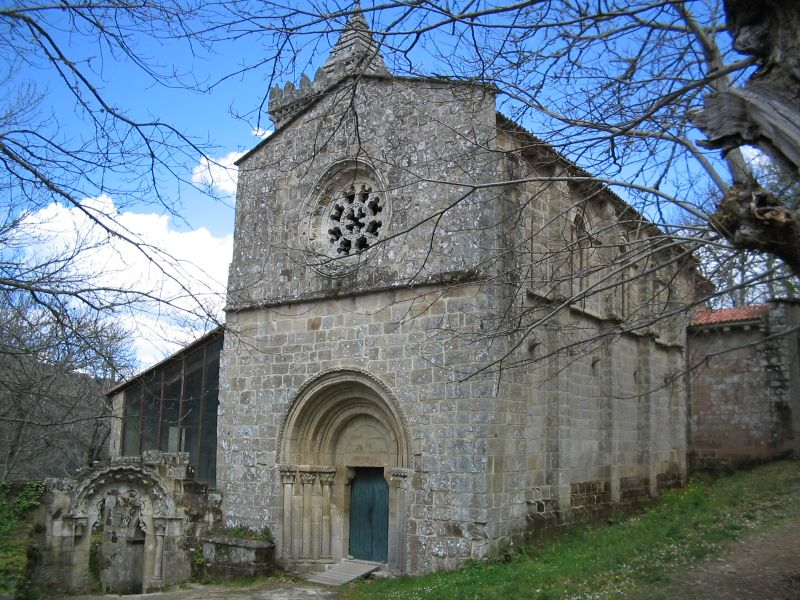
- Facade of the monastery.

Religion
- Affiliation: Roman Catholic

Location
- Location: Parada de Sil, Galicia
- Country: Spain
- Interactive map of Monastery of Santa Cristina de Ribas de Sil

Architecture
- Style: Romanesque

The monastery of Santa Cristina de Ribas de Sil is a monastery in Galicia, Spain.
