= Tecnopole =

Technology park in Galicia, Spain

Tecnópole (Parque Tecnolóxico de Galicia)
Localización	San Cibrao das Viñas, Ourense
www.tecnopole.es Official website

The Tecnopole is a technology park in Galicia, Spain, with an area of 550,000 square metres. It is located 12 kilometres from Ourense city and is accessible by motorways and dual carriageways from the rest of Spain.

The park provides services to Galician industrial activity from San Cibrao das Viñas locality in Ourense and includes more than 80 enterprises. The Technology Wood Centre (CIS Madeira), the Meat Centre (Centro Tecnolóxico da Carne), the Metallurgy Centre (Aimen) and the Metrology Laboratory of Galicia (LOMG) manage their activities from the Technology Park.

== Origin ==
The Tecnopole was born in 1992 thanks to the effort of the Xunta de Galicia, that had the support of the three Galician Universities, the Deputation of Ourense, the councils of Ourense and San Cibrao das Viñas and other institutions.

== Aim and services ==
Tecnopole focuses on initiatives related to the technological innovation, promoting knowledge and technology transfer and facilitating the creation and development of technology-based enterprises.

The enterprises in the Technology Park have telecommunication services, purchasing digital centre, support to the R&D&i and business cooperation, technology transfer net, language courses and others such as heliport, sport centre, training and an Experimentation in Renewable Energies Centre open to all Galician enterprises.

== Occupation and sectors ==
The profile of the enterprises located in the Tecnopole corresponds to activities with a high R&D&i index and application and development of new technologies; relationship with the University and Technology centres; attraction capacity of other high technology enterprises; highly qualified employees; scientific, technical and innovative potential; and high technical and economic prospects.

30 per cent of the activity in the park is centered on Information and Communication Technologies (ICT) and the rest is diversified with a trend to specialization in two areas: biotechnology and renewable energies (including an Experimentation in Renewable Energies Centre, and a Biotechnology Enterprises Shuttle).

== Projects ==
The Tecnopole is responsible for regional projects such as the creation of an aerial network of R&D in Galicia, Scientific and Technology Parks Network in Galicia in the future and an Innovation Private Agent Network.

It has been involved in projects nationwide, such as ‘Ceipar’ –Creation of Innovative Enterprises Scheme in Parks- and the ‘Red TT’ –Technology Transfer Net-, both with the collaboration of the Scientific and Technology Spanish Parks Association, that it is a member of.

For European projects, it participates in ‘Parque’ –to attract investments to the business parks in the Euro region Galicia-North of Portugal– and took part in ‘Serbatec’ –Cross-border Net of Technology-based Resources and Services.

To support the enterprises located in its area, Tecnopole set into motion in 2005 the Financing Project Office, established to offer information and counselling to start R&D&i projects.

== Business nurseries ==
The Tecnopole has two business nurseries, one owned by the park and another owned by the Chamber of Commerce and Industry, and it soon will join the Biotechnology Enterprise Shuttle (focused on the launching of business initiatives in this sector). Once an enterprise is installed, the nursery has the facilities to assist the enterprises activities including the support of the Project Office for developing R&D&i initiatives and finding finance.

== Certifications and CSR ==
Tecnopole has quality certification UNE-EN ISO 9001:2000 and environment certification UNE-EN ISO 14001:2004 and the Regulation EMAS, the environmental standard of reference.

The Corporate Social Responsibility policy (CSR) in Tecnopole has initiatives related to Personal and Family Life Coordination Support policies. Employees may be remote workers with flextime.

== Enterprises ==
- Agroamb Prodalt
- Aimen- Asociación de Investigación Metalúrgica del Noroeste
- Akros, Xestión Integral do Patrimonio S.L.N.E.
- Alert Life Sciences Computing, S.A.
- Allenta Consulting, S.L.
- Applied Materials
- Ars Humana
- Arte+Innovación. Estudio Experimental del Vidrio
- Aukor Automatización y Control Industrial, S.L.
- Aurianet, S.L.
- Bioquorum, S.L.
- Bioseguridad de Galicia, S.L.
- Cablemat S.A.
- Celcoauto
- Centro Asistencial: Klinika Euskarri
- Centro de Atención de Llamadas, S.A.
- Centro Tecnolóxico da Carne
- CIS-Madeira
- CITI
- Coasa, S.A.
- Colabora Ingenieros, S.L.
- Conexiona Telecom, S.L.
- Consultoría Software Visual, S.L.
- Contact Comunicación, S.L.N.E.
- Coren CTI
- Coren I+D
- Cruz Castro Renovables, S.L.
- DYR, Producciones Audiovisuales, S.L.
- Edisa Centro de Innovación S.A.
- Egatel, S.L.
- Enyiris, S.L.
- Excelia, S.L.
- Formato Verde, S.L.
- Forte's
- Gaélica Solar, S.L.
- Galiciaclass S.C.
- Grupo Cablemat S.A.
- Hispamoldes, S.A.
- Ideit, S.L.
- Iicel Coñecemento, S.L.
- Imagos 2005, S.L.
- Imgrafor, S.A.
- Ingeniería y Gestión Eiga, S.L.
- Invatia Research S.L.
- Itega Ourense, S.L.
- Kinétika innovacións estruturais, S.L.
- Laboratorio Oficial de Metroloxía de Galicia
- Laccio Consulting, S.L.L.
- Laddes Works, S.L.
- Legislado Información Legal, S.L.
- Mecánicas del Pisuerga S.A.
- Mister Doc, Centros Digitales, S.L.
- Netgal Software, S.L.
- Noroeste de Valor Asociados, S.L.L.
- Novelle y Fernández Ingeniería, S.L.
- Nutriup S.L.
- Odeleva
- Píntega Enxeñería, S.L.
- Qualigal, S.L.N.E.
- Quobis Networks, S.L.
- Raisin D'Or
- RCG Comunicaciones
- Redegal
- Roberto Verino Difusión, S.A.
- Sanigestión, S.L.
- Sogaserso, S.A.
- Solar Pereiro, S.L.
- Soluciones Imasde S.A.
- Soluciones Medioambientales y Aguas S.A.
- Sonen Centro de Acústica e Servizos de Telecomunicacións, S.L.
- Superalia Sistemas S.L.
- Talleres Arisa Ourense, S.L.
- Telémaco, S.L.
- Trabeculae. Empresa de Base Tecnológica S.L.
- T-Solar Global, S.A.
- Tuconsa, S.A.
- Vertical Partner, S.A.
- Vivero de la Cámara Oficial de Comercio e Industria de Ourense
- Volumetrika Media, S.L.
- Wagon Automotive Iberica, S.L.
- Xeoaquis, S.L.
