= Verín (comarca) =

Coordinates: 41°57′40″N 7°25′40″W

- Comarca
- Flag Coat of arms
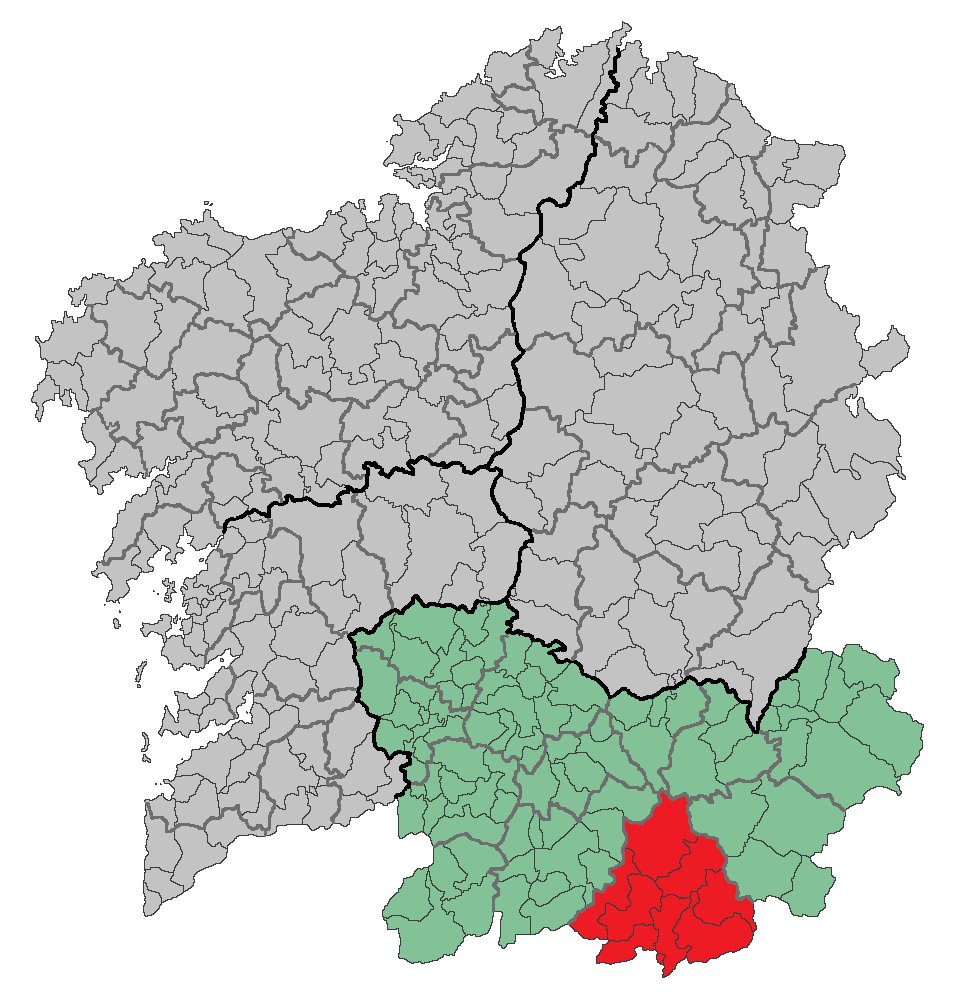
- Country: Spain
- Autonomous community: Galicia
- Province: Ourense
- Capital: Verín
- Municipalities: List: Castrelo do Val, Cualedro, Laza, Monterrei, Oímbra, Riós, Verín, Vilardevós
- Time zone: UTC+1 (CET)
  - Summer (DST): UTC+2 (CEST)

Verín is a comarca in the Galician Province of Ourense. The overall population of this local region is 25,217 (2019).

== Municipalities ==
Castrelo do Val, Cualedro, Laza, Monterrei, Oímbra, Riós, Verín and Vilardevós.
