= A Baixa Limia =

- Comarca
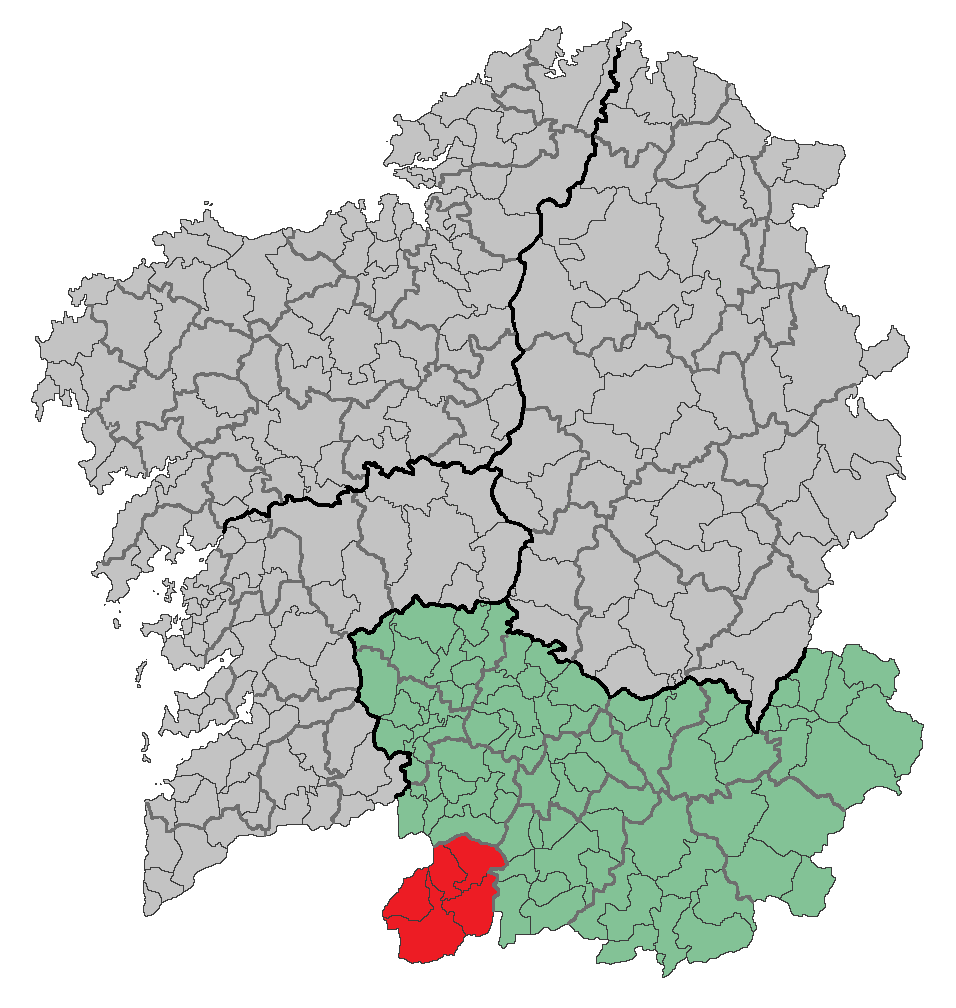
- Coordinates: 42.340009°N 7.864641°W
- Country: Spain
- Autonomous community: Galicia
- Province: Ourense
- Municipalities: List: Bande, Entrimo, Lobeira, Lobios, Muíños

Population
  - Total: 9,245
- Time zone: UTC+1 (CET)
  - Summer (DST): UTC+2 (CEST)

A Baixa Limia is a comarca in the Galician province of Ourense. The overall population of this local region is 9,245 (2005).

== Municipalities ==
Bande, Entrimo, Lobeira, Lobios and Muíños.
