= Terra de Caldelas =

Coordinates: 42°21′24″N 7°29′26″W

A Terra de Caldelas
- Comarca
- Flag Coat of arms
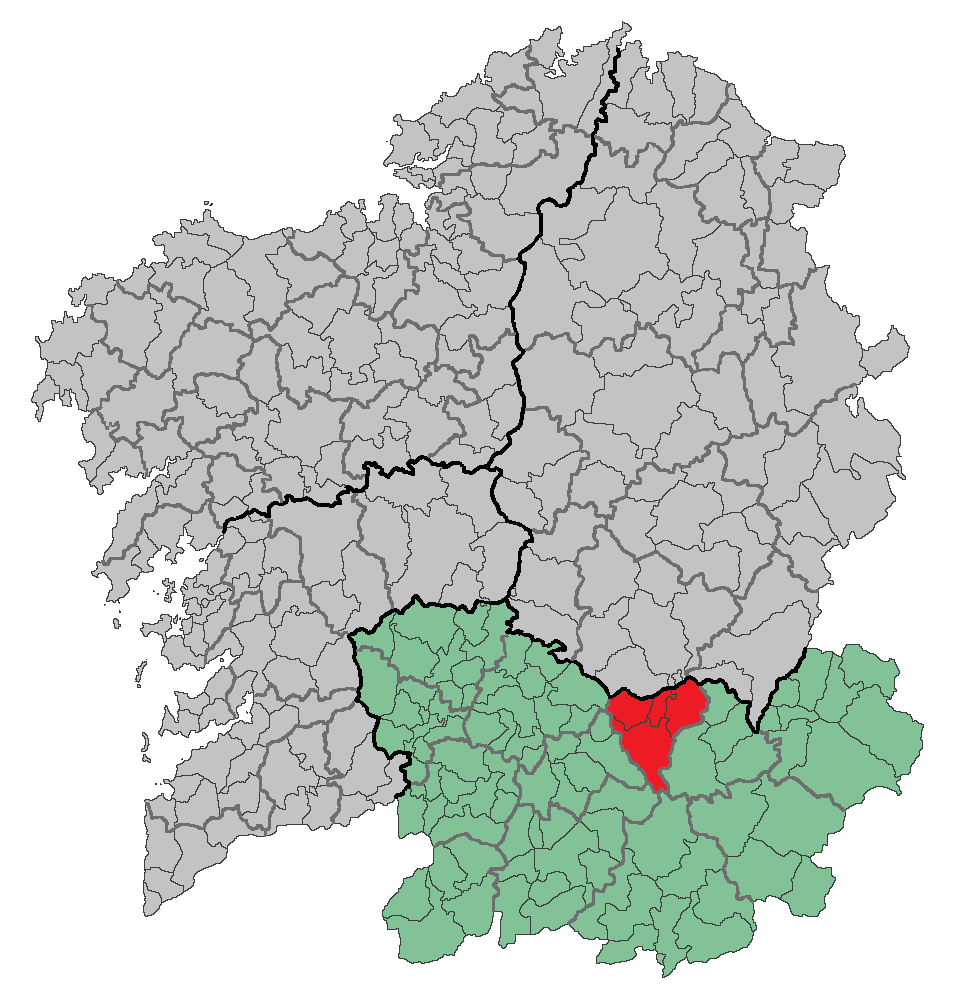
- Country: Spain
- Autonomous community: Galicia
- Province: Ourense
- Capital: Castro Caldelas
- Municipalities: List: Castro Caldelas, Montederramo, Parada de Sil, A Teixeira

Area
  - Total: 313.25 km^{2} (120.95 sq mi)

Population (2019)
  - Total: 2,789
  - Density: 8.903/km^{2} (23.06/sq mi)
- Time zone: UTC+1 (CET)
  - Summer (DST): UTC+2 (CEST)

A Terra de Caldelas is a comarca in the Galician Province of Ourense. The overall population of this local region is 2,789 (2019).

== Municipalities ==
Castro Caldelas, Montederramo, Parada de Sil and A Teixeira.
