= Ourense (comarca) =

Coordinates: 42.3667°N 7.83333°W

- Comarca
- Flag Coat of arms
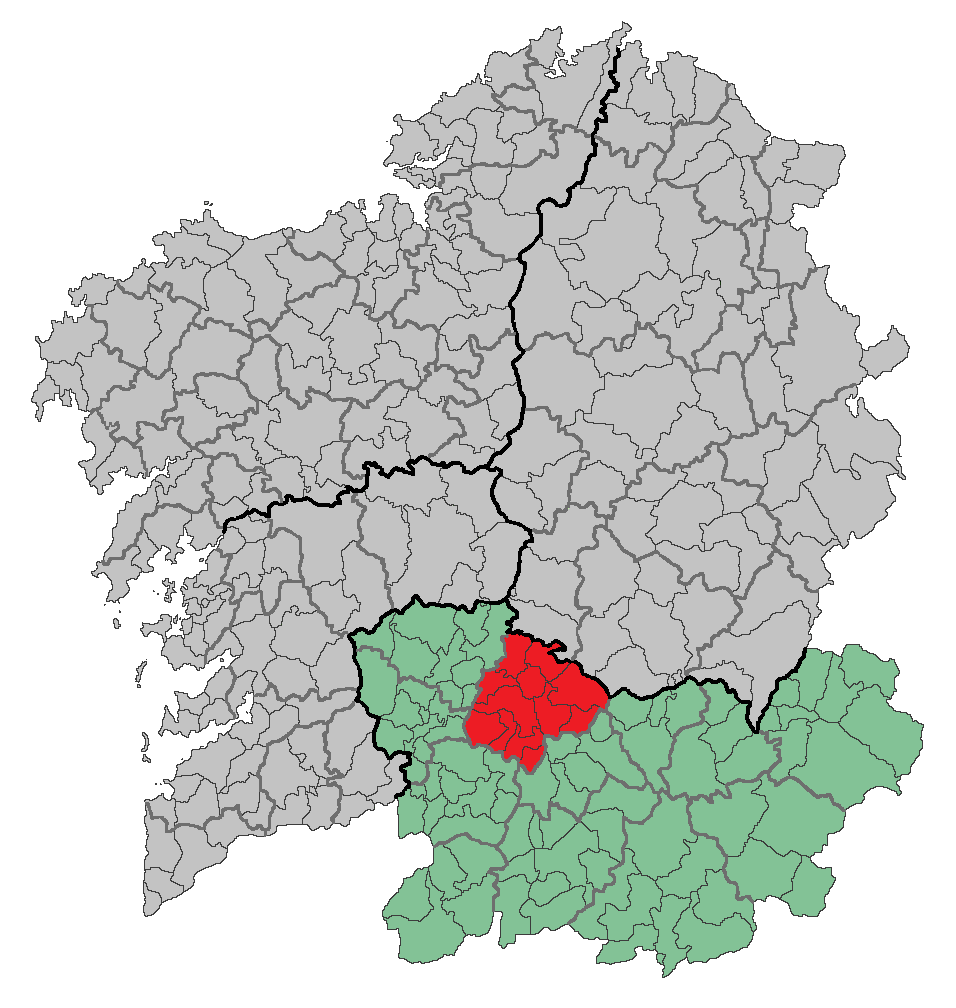
- Country: Spain
- Autonomous community: Galicia
- Province: Ourense
- Capital: Ourense
- Municipalities: List: Amoeiro, Barbadás, Coles, Esgos, Nogueira de Ramuín, Ourense, O Pereiro de Aguiar, A Peroxa, San Cibrao das Viñas, Taboadela

Area
  - Total: 623.14 km^{2} (240.60 sq mi)

Population (2019)
  - Total: 143,851
  - Density: 230.85/km^{2} (597.90/sq mi)
- Time zone: UTC+1 (CET)
  - Summer (DST): UTC+2 (CEST)

Ourense is a comarca in the Galician Province of Ourense. The overall population of this local region is 143,851 (2019).

== Municipalities ==
Amoeiro, Barbadás, Coles, Esgos, Nogueira de Ramuín, Ourense, O Pereiro de Aguiar, A Peroxa, San Cibrao das Viñas, Taboadela, Toén and Vilamarín.
