= Lobeira, Spain =

Lobeira
- municipality
- Flag Coat of arms

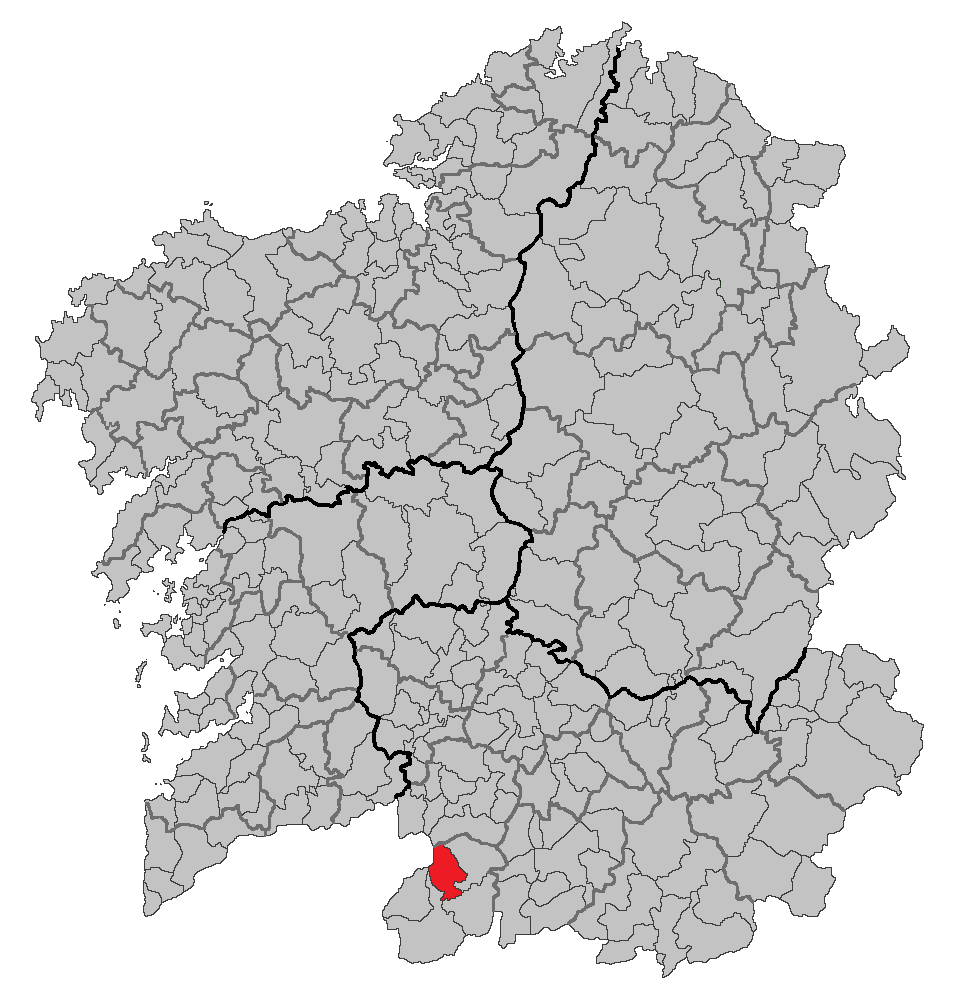
- Location in Galicia

- Location in Spain
- Coordinates: 41°59′56″N 8°02′35″W
- Country: Spain
- Autonomous community: Galicia
- Province: Ourense
- Comarca: A Baixa Limia

Government
  - Mayor: Antonio Iglesias Álvarez (People's Party)

Area
  - Total: 68.9 km^{2} (26.6 sq mi)
- Elevation: 680 m (2,230 ft)

Population (2025-01-01)
  - Total: 703
  - Density: 10.2/km^{2} (26.4/sq mi)
- Time zone: UTC+1 (CET)
  - Summer (DST): UTC+2 (CEST)
- Website: www.lobeira.es

Lobeira is a municipality in the province of Ourense, in the autonomous community of Galicia, Spain. It belongs to the comarca of A Baixa Limia.

It had a population of 809 inhabitants in 2016.
