= Oímbra =

Municipality in Galicia, Spain

- Municipality
- Flag Coat of arms

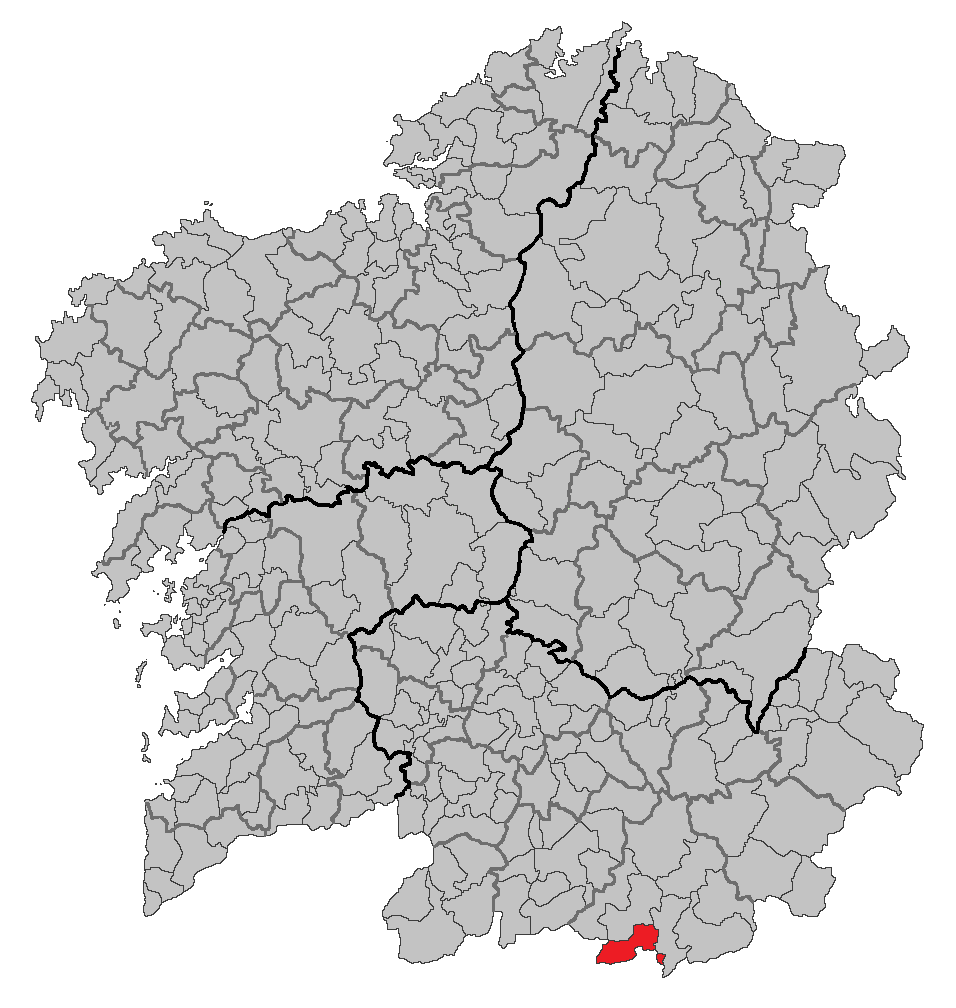
- Location in Galicia

- Location in Spain
- Coordinates: 41°53′7″N 7°28′21″W
- Country: Spain
- Autonomous community: Galicia
- Province: Ourense
- Comarca: Verín

Government
  - Mayor: Ana María Villarino Pardo (PPdeG)

Area
  - Total: 71.9 km^{2} (27.8 sq mi)
- Elevation: 432 m (1,417 ft)

Population (2025-01-01)
  - Total: 1,689
  - Density: 23.5/km^{2} (60.8/sq mi)
- Time zone: UTC+1 (CET)
  - Summer (DST): UTC+2 (CEST)
- Website: Official website

Oímbra is a municipality in the province of Ourense, in the autonomous community of Galicia, Spain. It belongs to the comarca of Verín. It has a population of 1,894 (2016) and an area of 72 km². The town borders Portugal to the south.

Oímbra contains the highest number of documented rock winepresses of any municipality in Galicia. This concentration reflects a long history of grape cultivation and viticulture suited to the region's climate and soil.

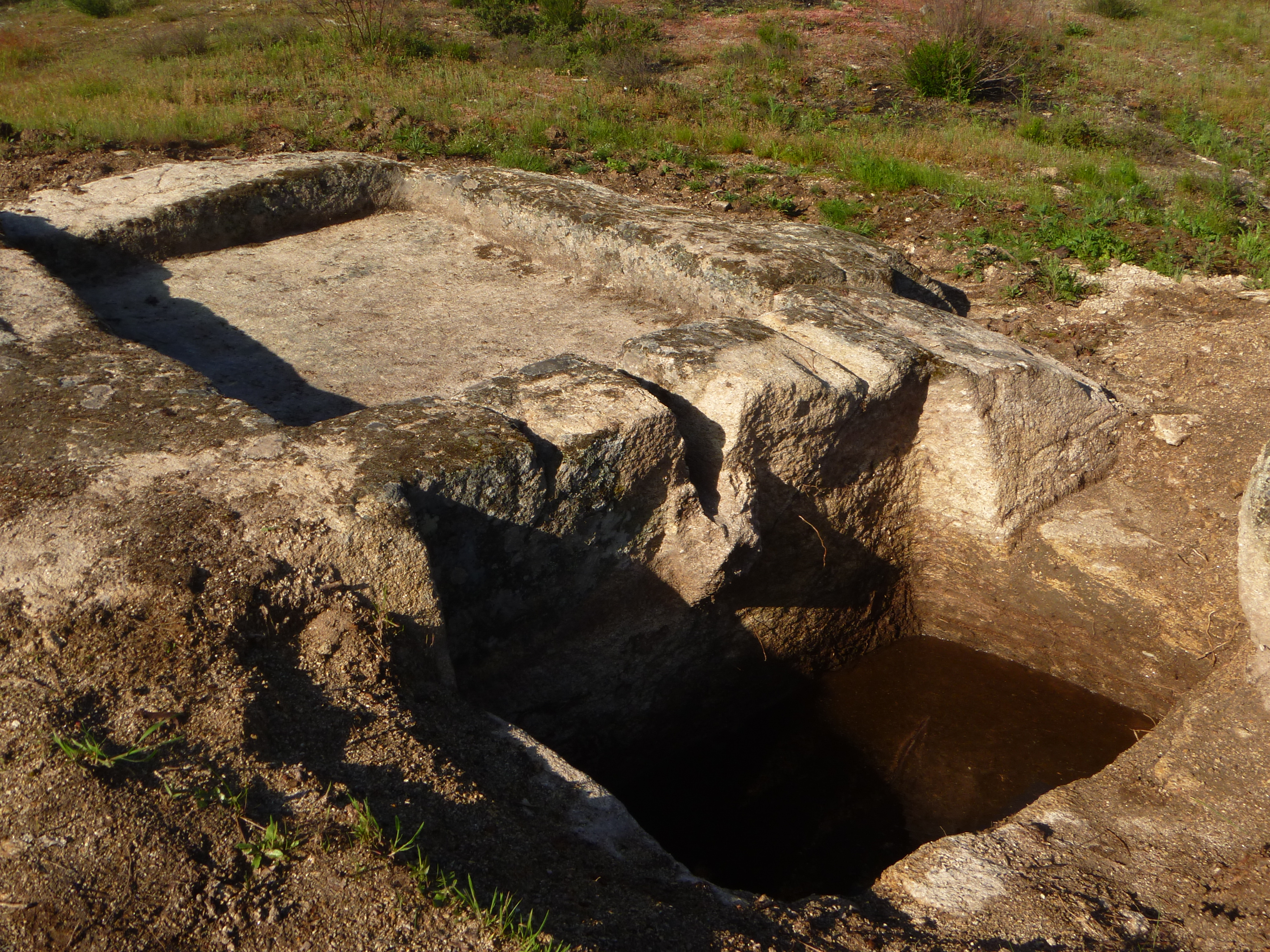
Rock winepress in Oímbra (Galicia/Spain)
