= Taboadela =

- Municipality
- Coat of arms

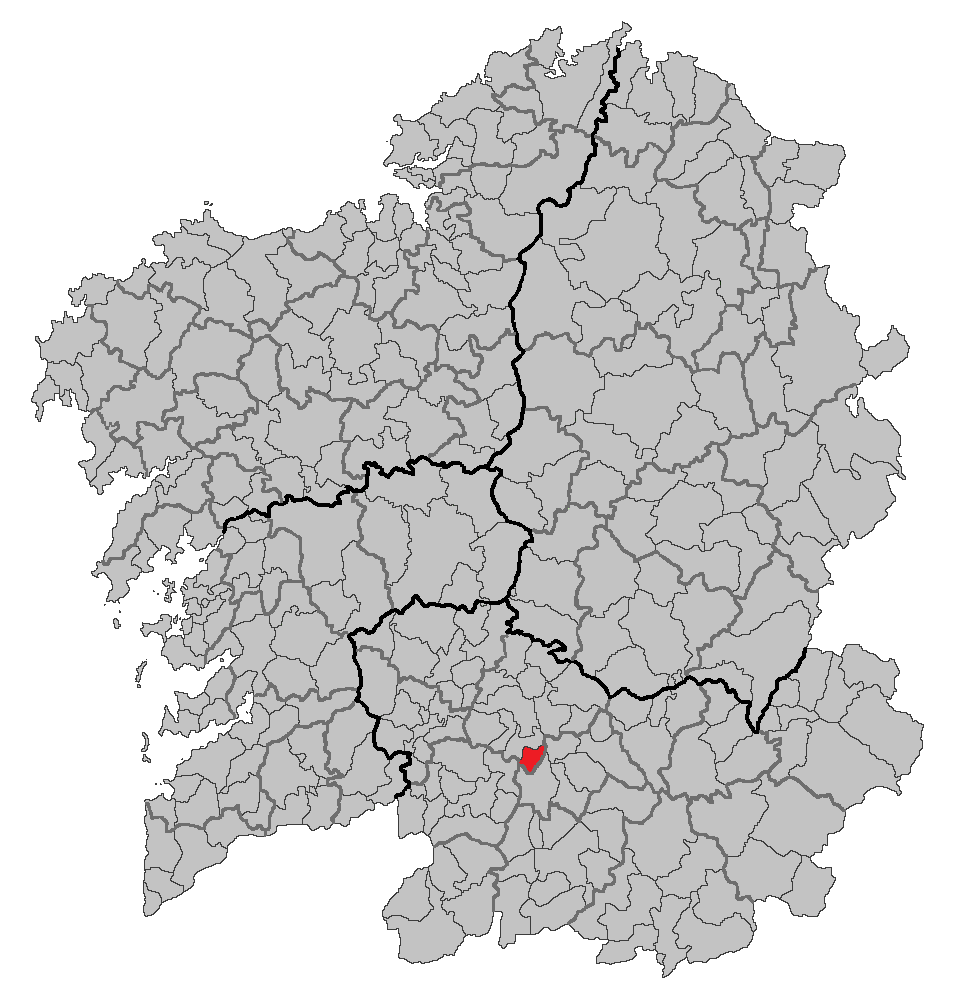
- Location in Galicia

- Location in Spain
- Coordinates: 42°14′27″N 7°49′30″W
- Country: Spain
- Autonomous community: Galicia
- Province: Ourense
- Comarca: Ourense

Government
  - Mayor: Álvaro Vila Araújo (PSOE)

Area
  - Total: 25.2 km^{2} (9.7 sq mi)
- Elevation: 386 m (1,266 ft)

Population (2025-01-01)
  - Total: 1,480
  - Density: 58.7/km^{2} (152/sq mi)
- Time zone: UTC+1 (CET)
  - Summer (DST): UTC+2 (CEST)
- Website: www.taboadela.es

Taboadela is a small municipality in the province of Ourense, in the autonomous community of Galicia, Spain. It belongs to the comarca of Ourense.
