= Laza, Spain =

Laza
- Municipality
- Flag Coat of arms

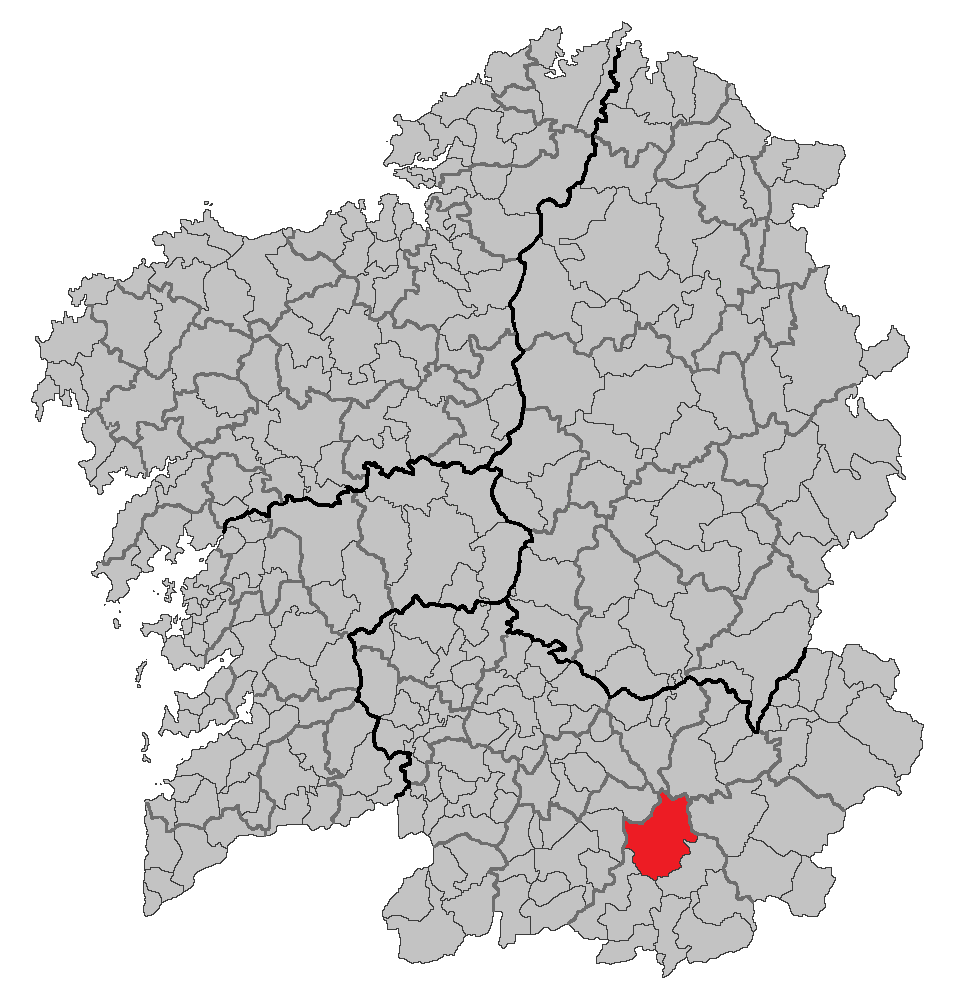
- Location in Galicia

- Location in Spain
- Coordinates: 42°03′38″N 7°27′41″W
- Country: Spain
- Autonomous community: Galicia
- Province: Ourense
- Comarca: Verín

Government
  - Mayor: Jose Ramón Barreal Novo (PPdeG)

Area
  - Total: 215.9 km^{2} (83.4 sq mi)
- Elevation: 482 m (1,581 ft)

Population (2025-01-01)
  - Total: 1,156
  - Density: 5.354/km^{2} (13.87/sq mi)
- Time zone: UTC+1 (CET)
  - Summer (DST): UTC+2 (CEST)
- Website: www.laza.es

Laza is a municipality in the province of Pontevedra, in the autonomous community of Galicia, Spain. It belongs to the comarca of Verín.
