= Muíños =

- municipality
- Coat of arms

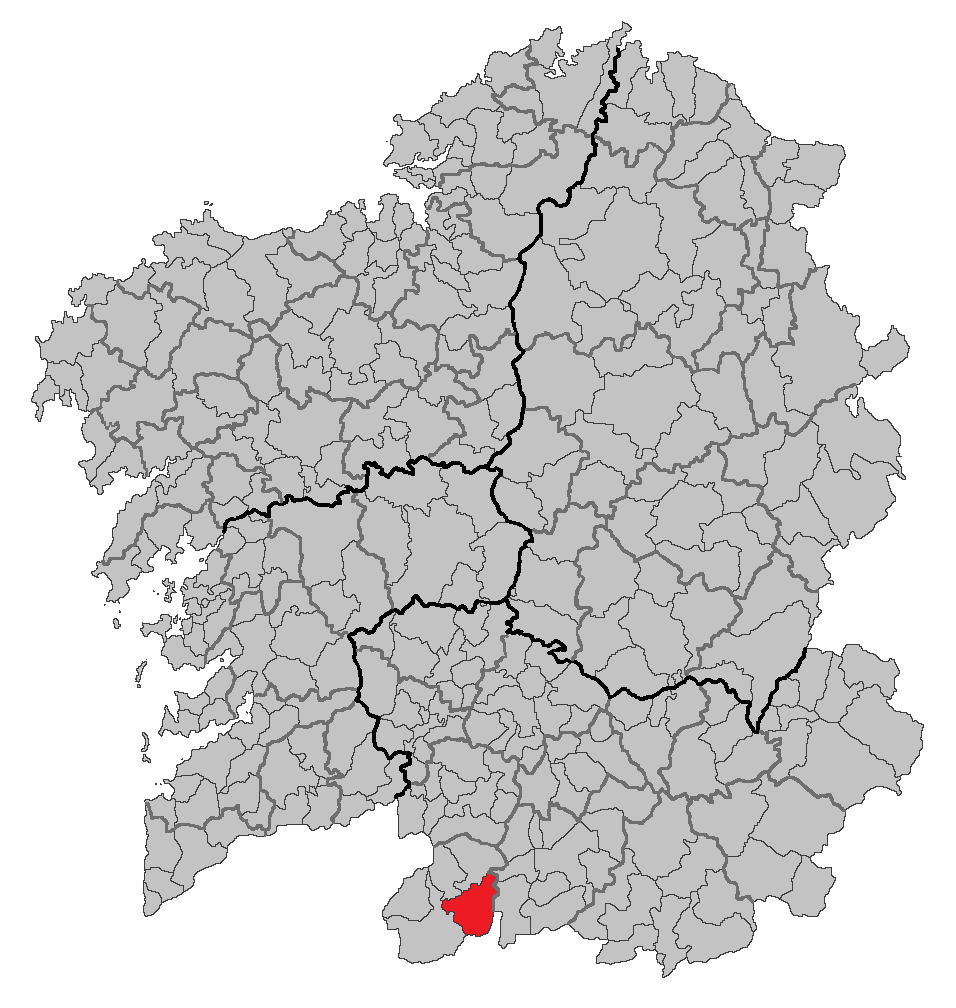
- Location in Galicia

- Location in Spain
- Coordinates: 41°57′15″N 7°59′08″W
- Country: Spain
- Autonomous community: Galicia
- Province: Ourense
- Comarca: A Baixa Limia

Government
  - Mayor: Plácido Álvarez Dobaño (PP)

Area
  - Total: 109.7 km^{2} (42.4 sq mi)
- Elevation: 577 m (1,893 ft)

Population (2025-01-01)
  - Total: 1,385
  - Density: 12.63/km^{2} (32.70/sq mi)
- Time zone: UTC+1 (CET)
  - Summer (DST): UTC+2 (CEST)
- Website: www.concellomuinos.com

Muiños is a municipality in the province of Ourense, in the autonomous community of Galicia, Spain. It belongs to the comarca of A Baixa Limia. It has a population of 1432 as of 2023 and an area of 110 km².
