= Esgos =

- Municipality
- Flag Coat of arms

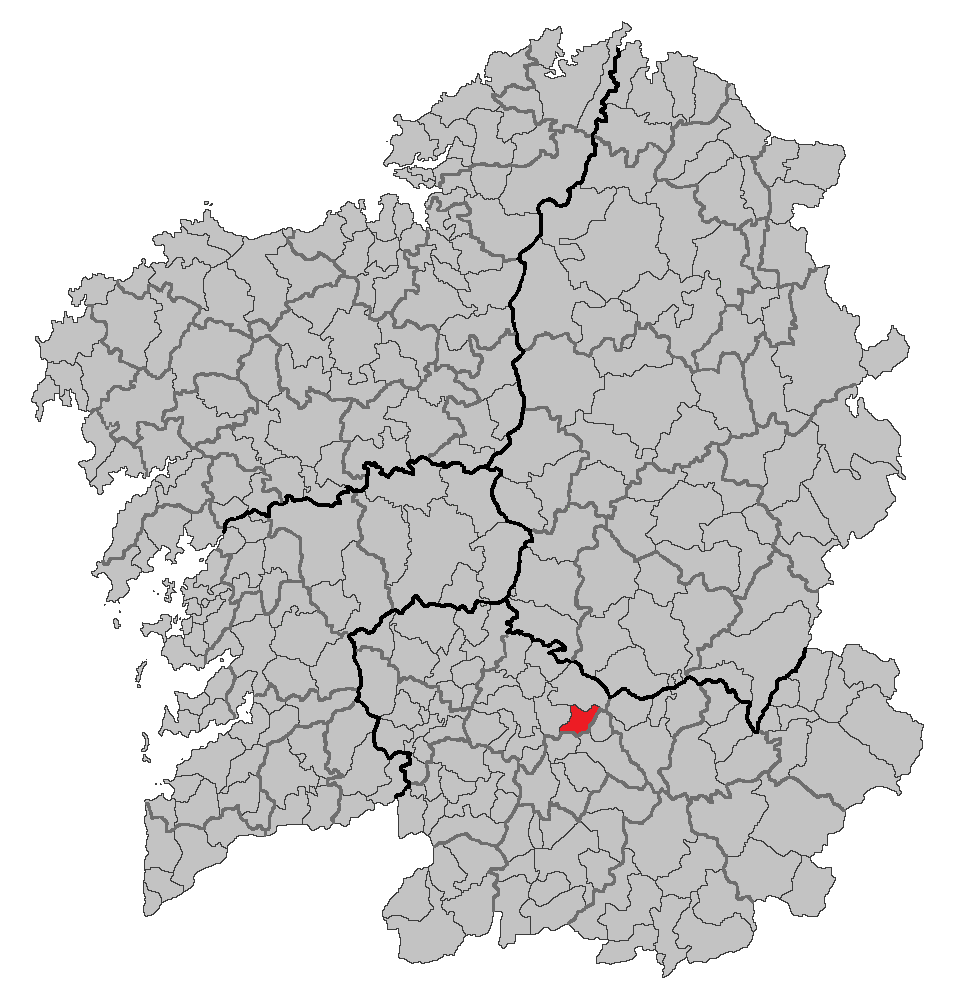
- Location in Galicia

- Location in Spain
- Coordinates: 42°19′30″N 7°41′50″W
- Country: Spain
- Autonomous community: Galicia
- Province: Ourense
- Comarca: Ourense

Government
  - Mayor: Mario Rodríguez González (PPdeG)

Area
  - Total: 37.8 km^{2} (14.6 sq mi)
- Elevation: 580 m (1,900 ft)

Population (2025-01-01)
  - Total: 1,103
  - Density: 29.2/km^{2} (75.6/sq mi)
- Time zone: UTC+1 (CET)
  - Summer (DST): UTC+2 (CEST)
- INE municipality code: 32031
- Website: www.concelloesgos.com

Esgos is a municipality in the province of Ourense, in the autonomous community of Galicia, Spain. It belongs to the comarca of Ourense.
