= Cualedro =

- Municipality
- Coat of arms

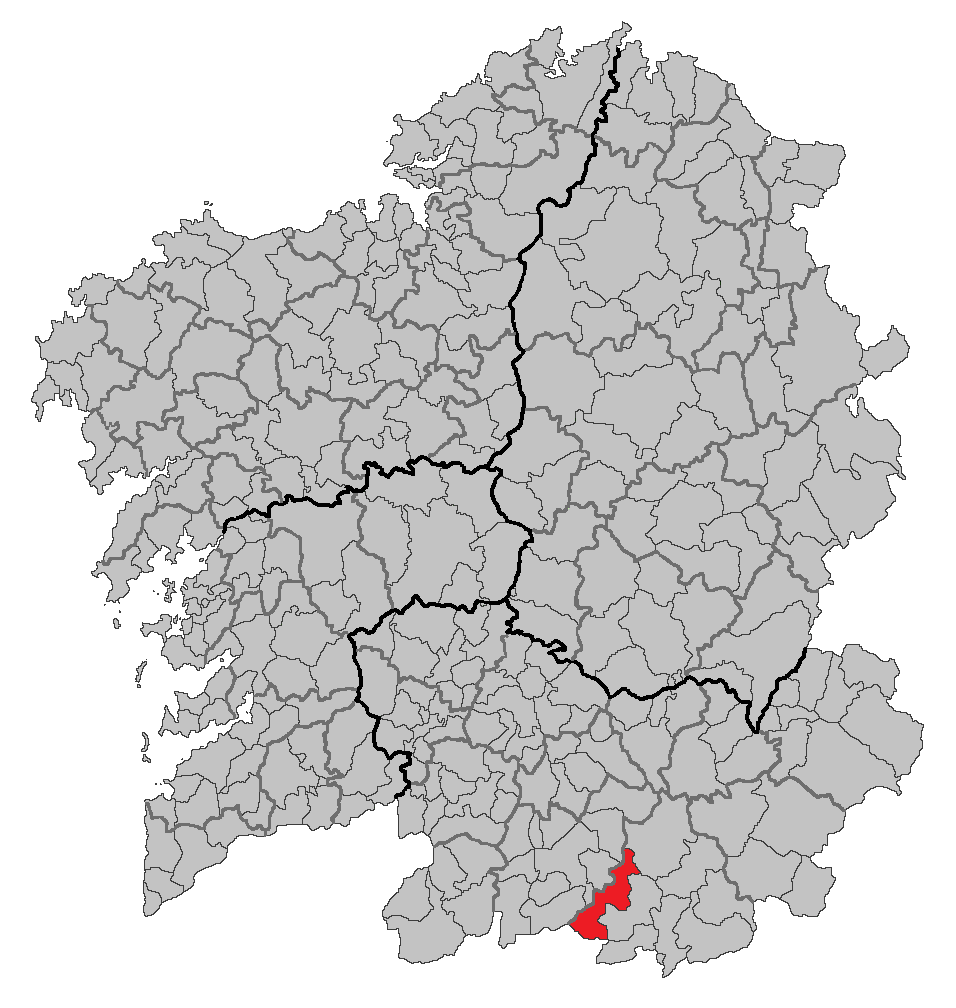
- Location in Galicia

- Location in Spain
- Coordinates: 41°58′59″N 7°34′59″W
- Country: Spain
- Autonomous community: Galicia
- Province: Ourense
- Comarca: Verín

Government
  - Mayor: Luciano Rivero Cuquejo (PPdeG)

Area
  - Total: 117.6 km^{2} (45.4 sq mi)
- Elevation: 843 m (2,766 ft)

Population (2025-01-01)
  - Total: 1,538
  - Density: 13.08/km^{2} (33.87/sq mi)
- Time zone: UTC+1 (CET)
  - Summer (DST): UTC+2 (CEST)
- INE municipality code: 32028
- Website: Official website

Cualedro is a municipality in the province of Ourense, in the autonomous community of Galicia, Spain. It belongs to the comarca of Verín. Its population was 1,792 in 2016. The municipality has an area of 117.6 km. The elevation level is 843 meters.
