= Vilardevós =

- municipality
- Flag Coat of arms

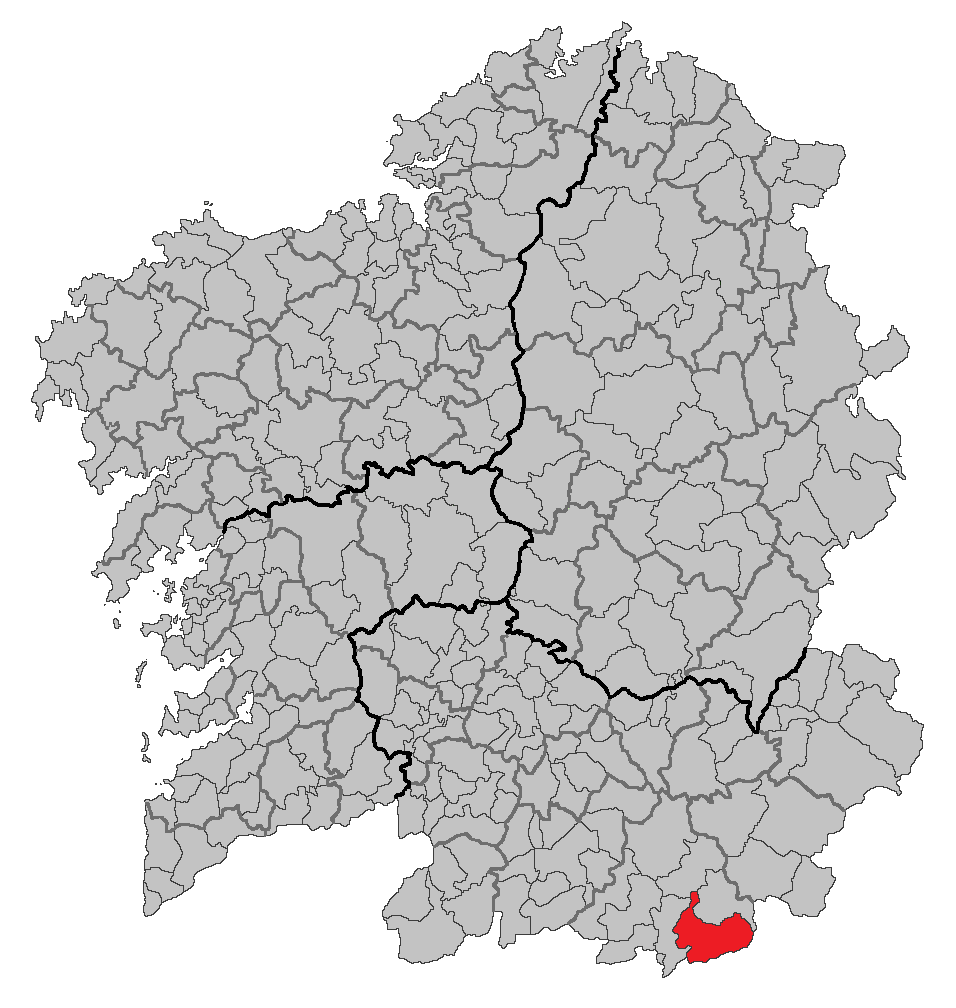
- Location in Galicia

- Location in Spain
- Coordinates: 41°54′25″N 7°18′47″W
- Country: Spain
- Autonomous community: Galicia
- Province: Ourense
- Comarca: Verín

Government
  - Mayor: Manuel Cardozo (People's Party)

Area
  - Total: 152.1 km^{2} (58.7 sq mi)
- Elevation: 750 m (2,460 ft)

Population (2025-01-01)
  - Total: 1,616
  - Density: 10.62/km^{2} (27.52/sq mi)
- Time zone: UTC+1 (CET)
  - Summer (DST): UTC+2 (CEST)
- Website: https://www.vilardevos.gal/

Vilardevós is a municipality in the province of Ourense, in the autonomous community of Galicia, Spain. It belongs to the comarca of Verín. It has a population of 2024 (2014) and an area of 152 km^{2}.
