= Bande, Ourense =

Bande
- Municipality
- Coat of arms

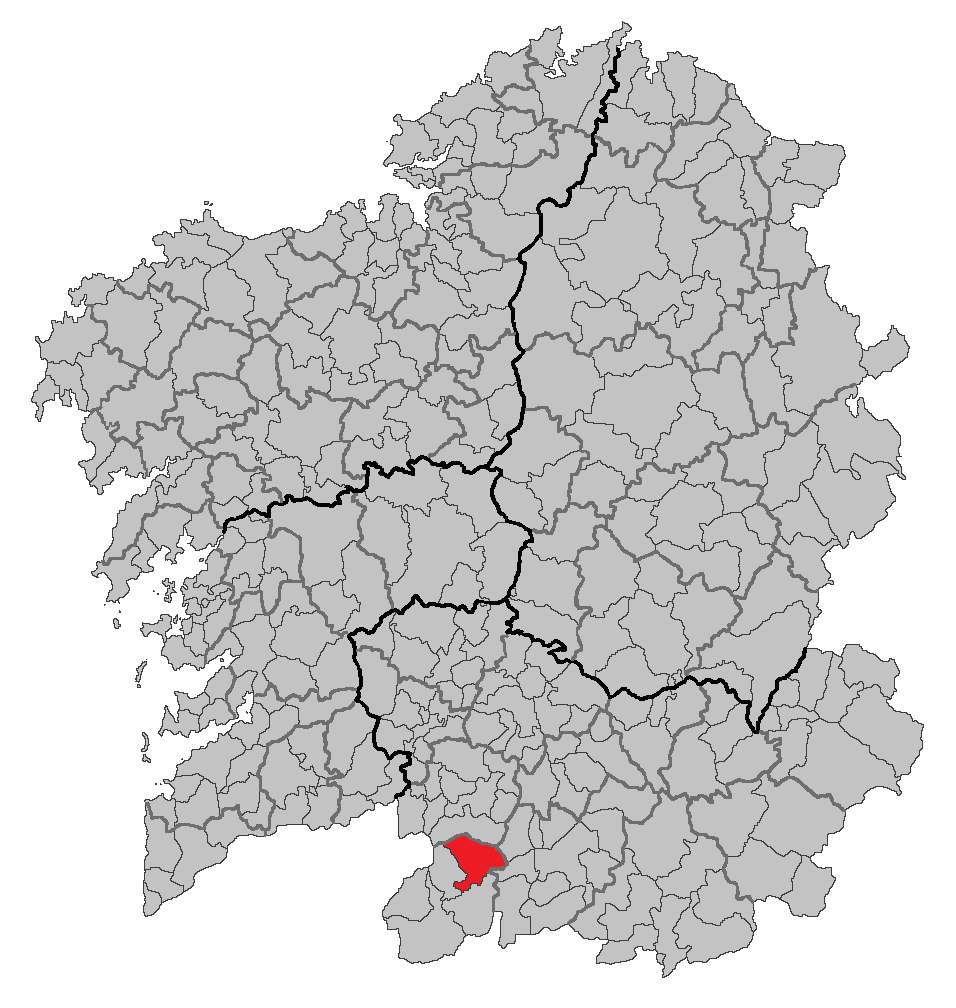
- Location in Galicia

- Location in Spain
- Coordinates: 42°01′50″N 7°58′31″W
- Country: Spain
- Autonomous community: Galicia
- Province: Ourense
- Comarca: A Baixa Limia

Government
  - Mayor: Sandra Quintas (PPdeG)

Area
  - Total: 99.0 km^{2} (38.2 sq mi)
- Elevation: 728 m (2,388 ft)

Population (2025-01-01)
  - Total: 1,460
  - Density: 14.7/km^{2} (38.2/sq mi)
- Time zone: UTC+1 (CET)
  - Summer (DST): UTC+2 (CEST)
- INE municipality code: 32006
- Website: Official website

Bande is a municipality in the province of Ourense, in the autonomous community of Galicia, Spain. It belongs to the comarca of A Baixa Limia.
