= A Peroxa =

- Municipality
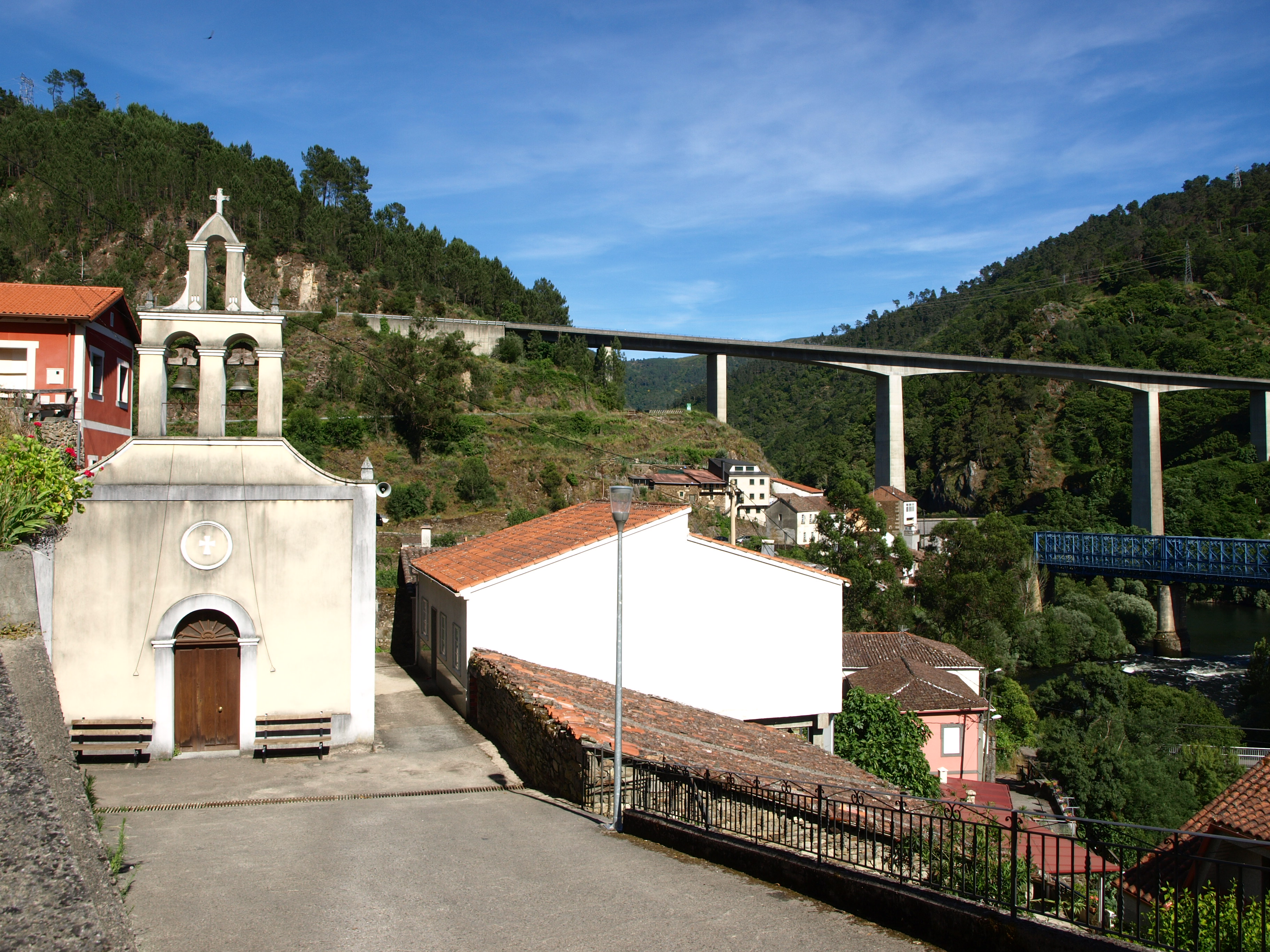

- Coat of arms

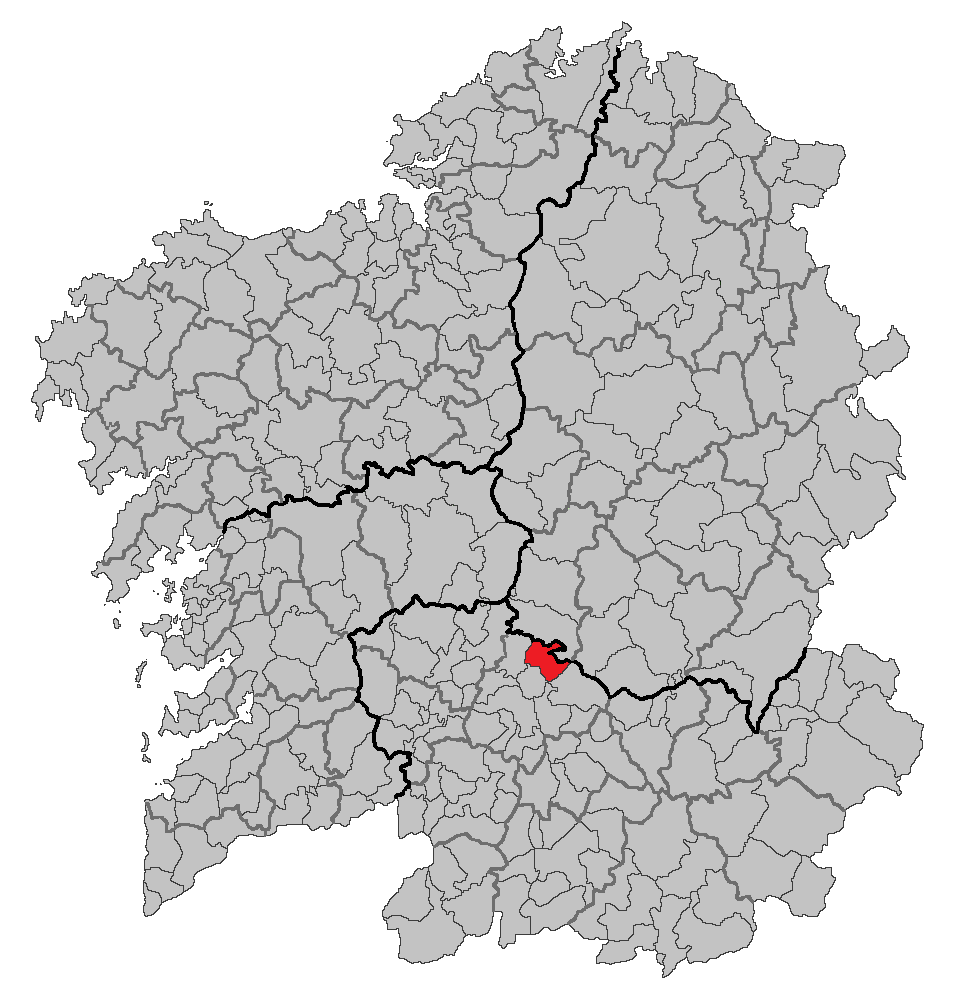
- Location in Galicia

- Location in Spain
- Coordinates: 42°26′20″N 7°47′36″W
- Country: Spain
- Autonomous community: Galicia
- Province: Ourense
- Comarca: Ourense

Government
  - Mayor: Manuel Seoane Rodríguez (People's Party)

Area
  - Total: 54.5 km^{2} (21.0 sq mi)
- Elevation: 551 m (1,808 ft)

Population (2025-01-01)
  - Total: 1,793
  - Density: 32.9/km^{2} (85.2/sq mi)
- Time zone: UTC+1 (CET)
  - Summer (DST): UTC+2 (CEST)
- Website: www.aperoxa.es

A Peroxa is a municipality in the province of Ourense, in the autonomous community of Galicia, Spain. It belongs to the comarca of Ourense.
