= Nogueira de Ramuín =

- Municipality
- Coat of arms

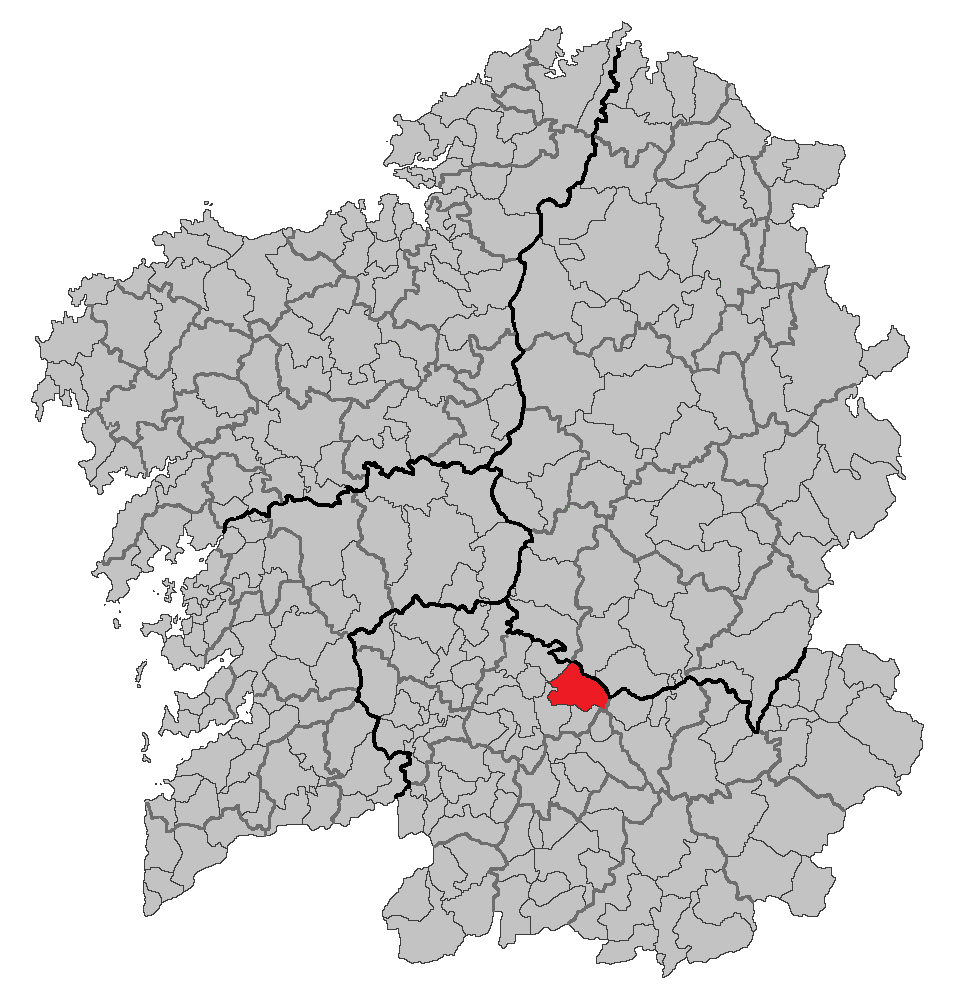
- Location in Galicia

- Location in Spain
- Coordinates: 42°25′11″N 7°45′11″W
- Country: Spain
- Autonomous community: Galicia
- Province: Ourense
- Comarca: Ourense

Government
  - Mayor: José César Parente Pérez (PP)

Area
  - Total: 98.3 km^{2} (38.0 sq mi)
- Elevation: 640 m (2,100 ft)

Population (2025-01-01)
  - Total: 2,074
  - Density: 21.1/km^{2} (54.6/sq mi)
- Time zone: UTC+1 (CET)
  - Summer (DST): UTC+2 (CEST)
- Website: www.nogueiraderamuin.com

Nogueira de Ramuín is a municipality in the province of Ourense, in the autonomous community of Galicia, Spain. It belongs to the comarca of Ourense. The municipality consists of 13 parroquias, with the capital being Luintra.
