= Entrimo =

- Municipality
- Coat of arms

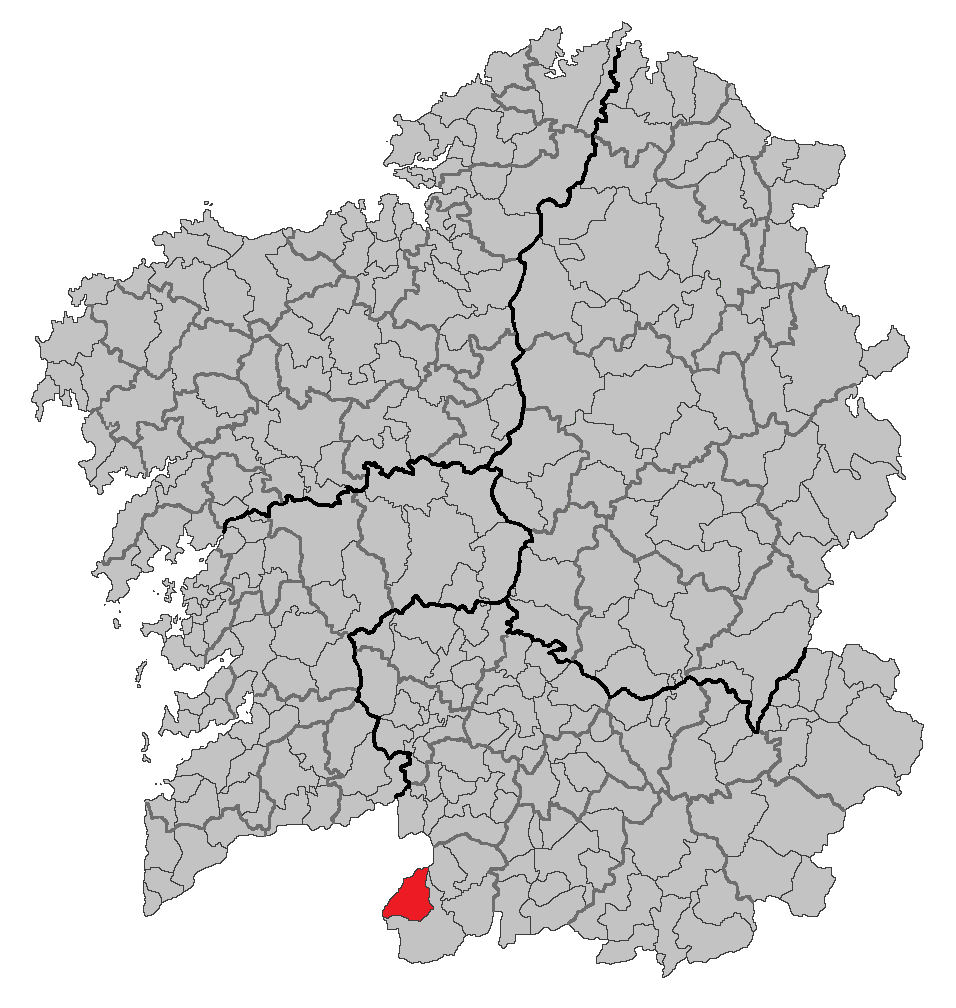
- Location in Galicia

- Location in Spain
- Coordinates: 41°56′N 8°07′W
- Country: Spain
- Autonomous community: Galicia
- Province: Ourense
- Comarca: A Baixa Limia

Government
  - Mayor: Ramón Alonso López (PSdeG-PSOE)

Area
  - Total: 84.5 km^{2} (32.6 sq mi)
- Elevation: 508 m (1,667 ft)

Population (2025-01-01)
  - Total: 1,093
  - Density: 12.9/km^{2} (33.5/sq mi)
- Time zone: UTC+1 (CET)
  - Summer (DST): UTC+2 (CEST)
- INE municipality code: 32030
- Website: www.concelloentrimo.es

Entrimo is a municipality in the province of Ourense, in the autonomous community of Galicia, Spain. It belongs to the comarca of A Baixa Limia.
