= Castrelo do Val =

- Municipality
- Flag Coat of arms

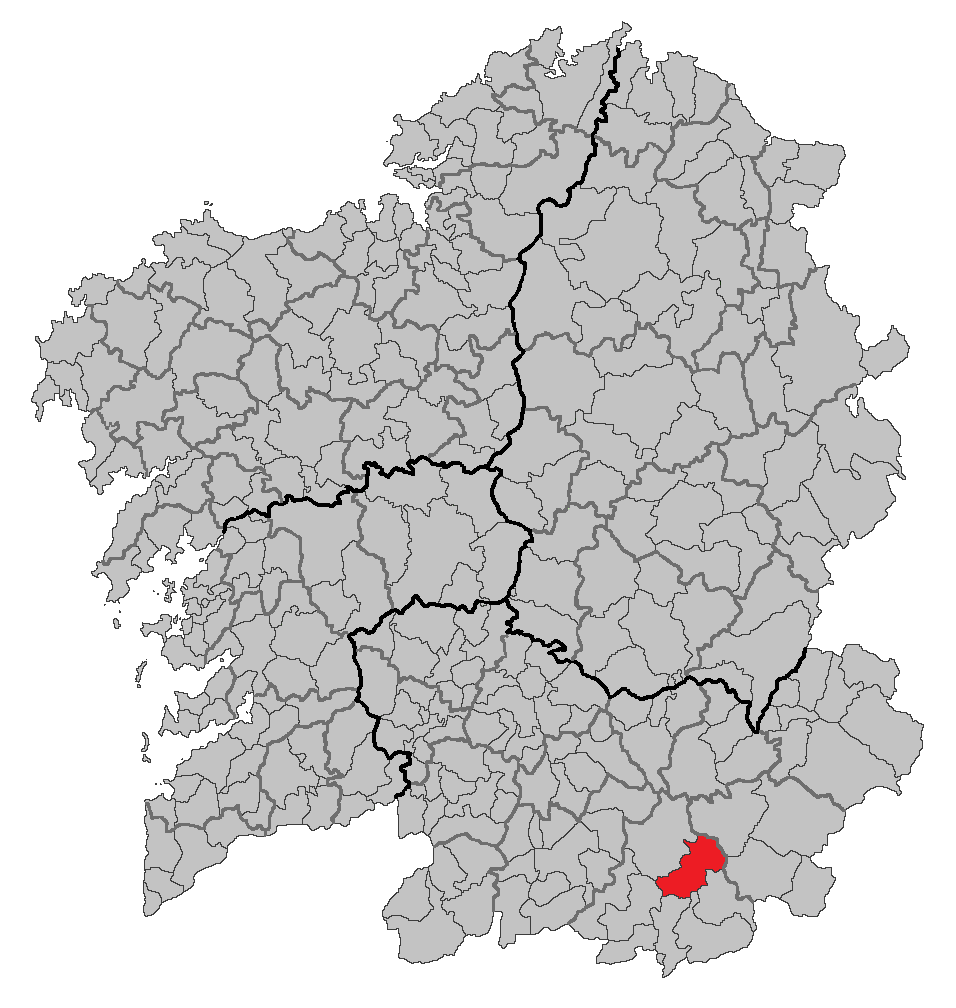
- Location in Galicia

- Location in Spain
- Coordinates: 41°59′26″N 7°25′27″W
- Country: Spain
- Autonomous community: Galicia
- Province: Ourense
- Comarca: Verín

Government
  - Mayor: Vicente Gómez García (Socialists' Party of Galicia)

Area
  - Total: 122.0 km^{2} (47.1 sq mi)
- Elevation: 417 m (1,368 ft)

Population (2025-01-01)
  - Total: 947
  - Density: 7.76/km^{2} (20.1/sq mi)
- Time zone: UTC+1 (CET)
  - Summer (DST): UTC+2 (CEST)
- INE municipality code: 32021
- Website: castrelodoval.gal

Castrelo do Val is a municipality in the province of Ourense, in the autonomous community of Galicia, Spain. It belongs to the comarca of Verín.
