= Montederramo =

- Municipality
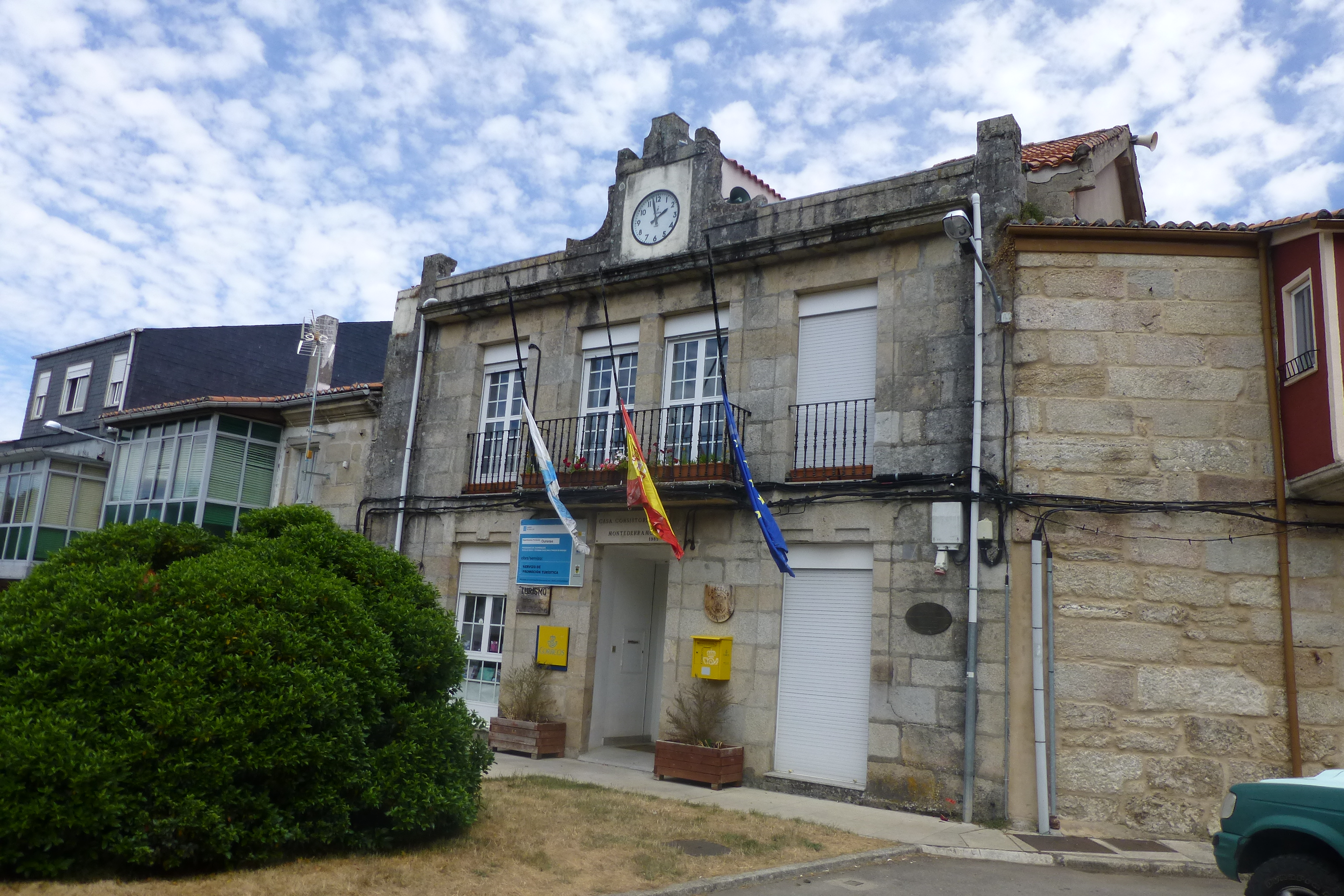

- Flag Coat of arms

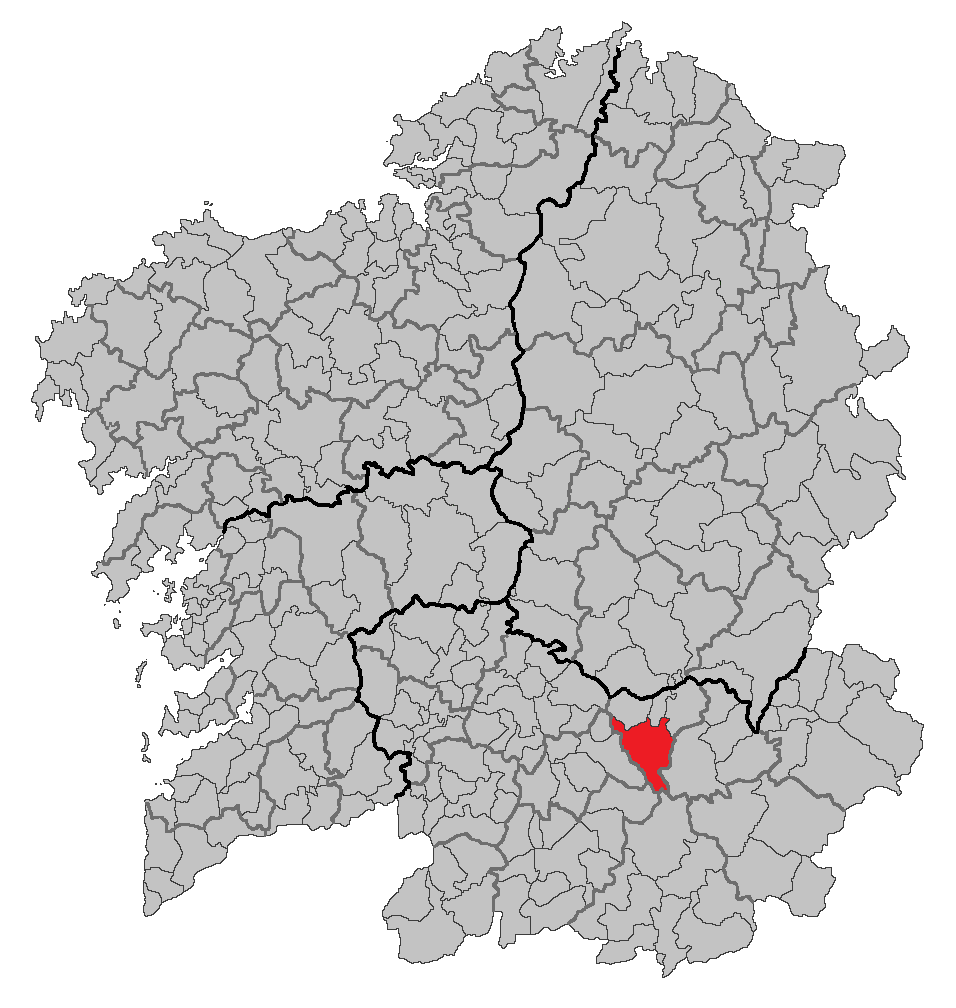
- Location in Galicia

- Location in Spain
- Coordinates: 42°16′36″N 7°30′25″W
- Country: Spain
- Autonomous community: Galicia
- Province: Ourense
- Comarca: Terra de Caldelas

Government
  - Mayor: Antonio Rodríguez Álvarez (PP)

Area
  - Total: 135.6 km^{2} (52.4 sq mi)
- Elevation: 904 m (2,966 ft)

Population (2025-01-01)
  - Total: 660
  - Density: 4.9/km^{2} (13/sq mi)
- Time zone: UTC+1 (CET)
  - Summer (DST): UTC+2 (CEST)
- Website: http://www.montederramo.es/

Montederramo is a municipality in the province of Ourense, in the autonomous community of Galicia, Spain. It belongs to the comarca of Terra de Caldelas.
