= A Teixeira =

- municipality
- Flag Coat of arms

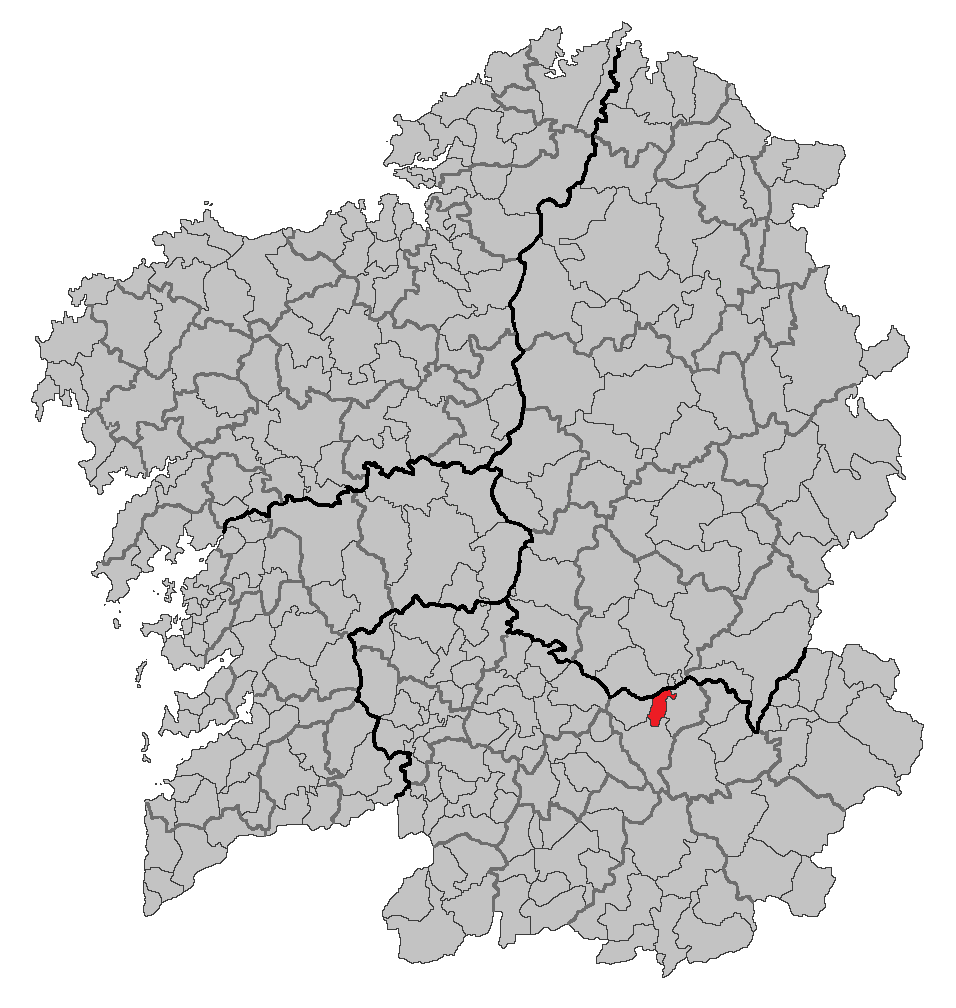
- Location in Galicia

- Location in Spain
- Coordinates: 42°23′30″N 7°28′27″W
- Country: Spain
- Autonomous community: Galicia
- Province: Ourense
- Comarca: Terra de Caldelas

Government
  - Mayor: Miguel Antonio Cid Álvarez (People's Party)

Area
  - Total: 27.6 km^{2} (10.7 sq mi)
- Elevation: 593 m (1,946 ft)

Population (2025-01-01)
  - Total: 328
  - Density: 11.9/km^{2} (30.8/sq mi)
- Time zone: UTC+1 (CET)
  - Summer (DST): UTC+2 (CEST)
- Website: www.concelloateixeira.org

A Teixeira is a municipality in the province of Ourense, in the autonomous community of Galicia, Spain. It belongs to the comarca of Terra de Caldelas. In 2008, it had a population of 505.
