= Vilamarín =

- Municipality
- Coat of arms

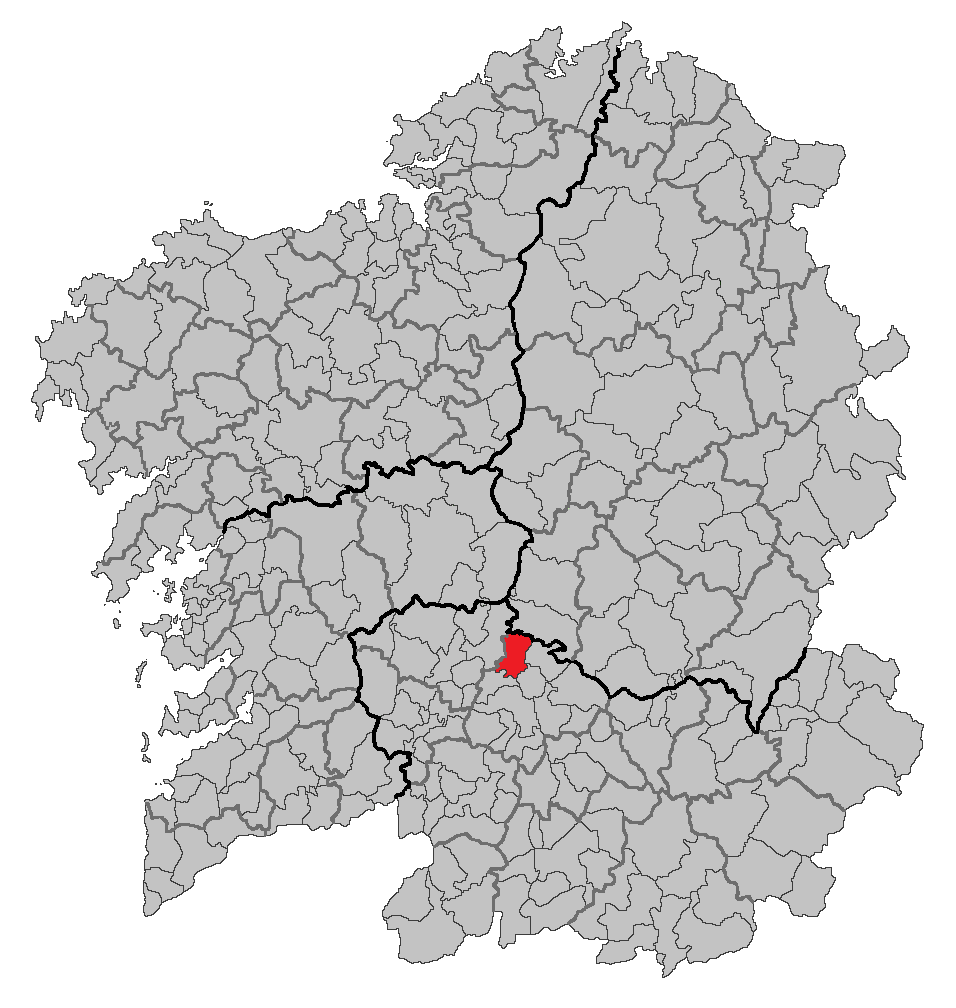
- Location in Galicia

- Location in Spain
- Coordinates: 42°27′50″N 7°53′24″W
- Country: Spain
- Autonomous community: Galicia
- Province: Ourense
- Comarca: Ourense

Government
  - Mayor: Amador Vázquez Vázquez (PP)

Area
  - Total: 56.1 km^{2} (21.7 sq mi)
- Elevation: 506 m (1,660 ft)

Population (2025-01-01)
  - Total: 1,836
  - Density: 32.7/km^{2} (84.8/sq mi)
- Time zone: UTC+1 (CET)
  - Summer (DST): UTC+2 (CEST)
- Website: Official website

Vilamarín (Galician pronunciation: [ˌbilɐmaˈɾiŋ]) is a municipality in the province of Ourense, in the autonomous community of Galicia, Spain. It belongs to the Comarca of Ourense. It has a population of 1996 (20166) and an area of 56 km².
