= Punxín =

- municipality
- Flag Coat of arms

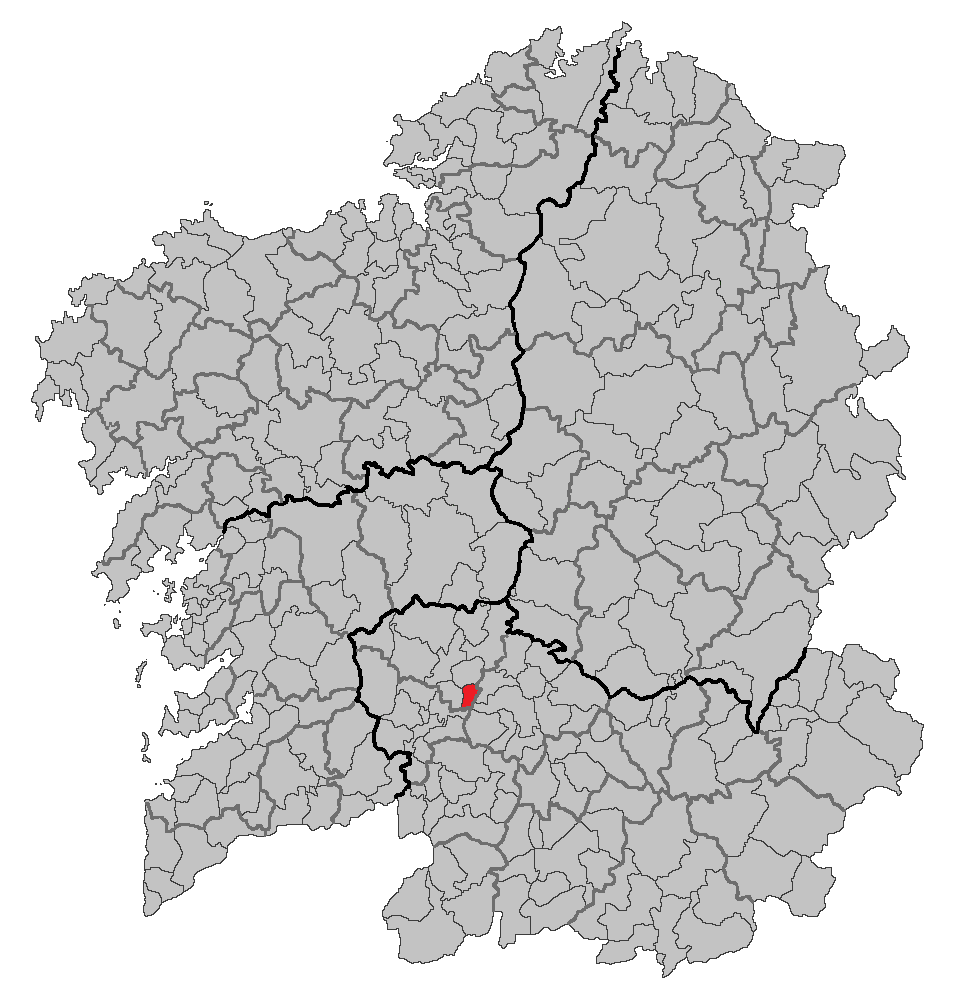
- Location in Galicia

- Location in Spain
- Coordinates: 42°22′13″N 8°00′43″W
- Country: Spain
- Autonomous community: Galicia
- Province: Ourense
- Comarca: O Carballiño

Government
  - Mayor: Alfredo Cruz Gago (PSdeG-PSOE)

Area
  - Total: 17.1 km^{2} (6.6 sq mi)
- Elevation: 145 m (476 ft)

Population (2025-01-01)
  - Total: 748
  - Density: 43.7/km^{2} (113/sq mi)
- Time zone: UTC+1 (CET)
  - Summer (DST): UTC+2 (CEST)

Punxín is a municipality in the province of Ourense, in the autonomous community Galicia, Spain. It belongs to the comarca of O Carballiño.
