= O Pereiro de Aguiar =

- municipality
- Coat of arms

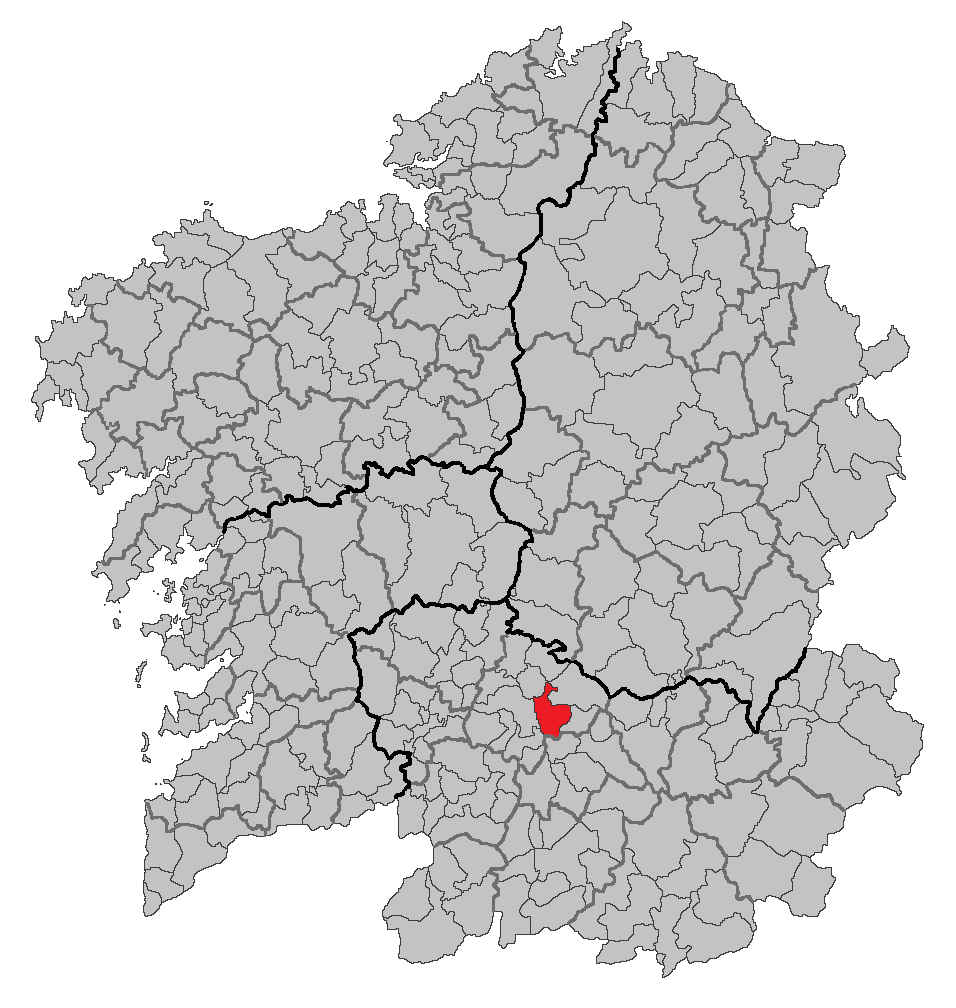
- Location in Galicia

- Location in Spain
- Coordinates: 42°20′47″N 7°48′01″W
- Country: Spain
- Autonomous community: Galicia
- Province: Ourense
- Comarca: Ourense

Government
  - Mayor: Eliseo Fernández Gómez (People's Party)

Area
  - Total: 60.9 km^{2} (23.5 sq mi)
- Elevation: 321 m (1,053 ft)

Population (2025-01-01)
  - Total: 6,794
  - Density: 112/km^{2} (289/sq mi)
- Time zone: UTC+1 (CET)
  - Summer (DST): UTC+2 (CEST)
- Postal Code: 32710
- Website: www.concellopereiro.com/www.concellopereiro.com/

O Pereiro de Aguiar is a small municipality in the province of Ourense, in the autonomous community of Galicia, Spain. It belongs to the comarca of Ourense.
