= Parada de Sil =

- Municipality
- Coat of arms

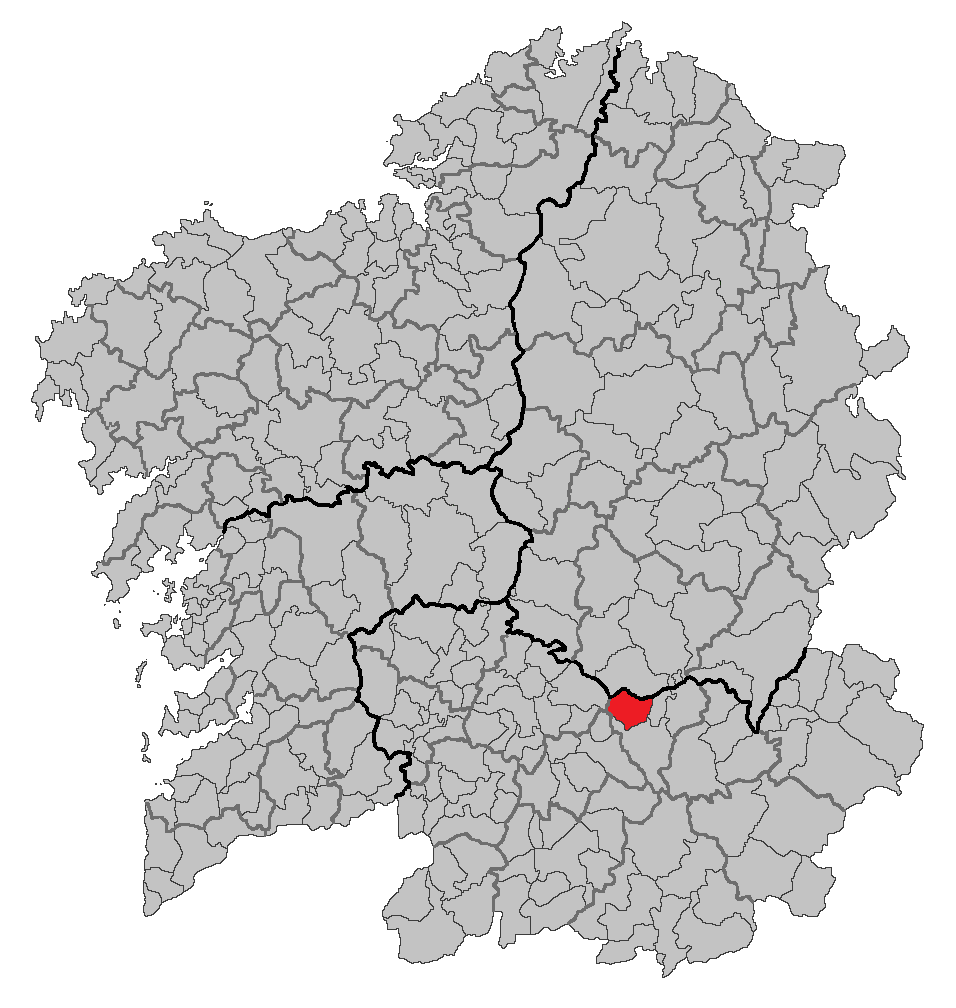
- Location in Galicia

- Location in Spain
- Coordinates: 42°22′59″N 7°34′08″W
- Country: Spain
- Autonomous community: Galicia
- Province: Ourense
- Comarca: Terra de Caldelas

Government
  - Mayor: Aquilino Domínguez Díaz (PSdeG-PSOE)

Area
  - Total: 62.4 km^{2} (24.1 sq mi)
- Elevation: 665 m (2,182 ft)

Population (2025-01-01)
  - Total: 500
  - Density: 8.0/km^{2} (21/sq mi)
- Time zone: UTC+1 (CET)
  - Summer (DST): UTC+2 (CEST)
- Website: http://www.paradadesil.es/

Parada de Sil is a municipality in the province of Ourense, in the autonomous community of Galicia, Spain. It belongs to the comarca of Terra de Caldelas.
