= Barbadás =

- Municipality
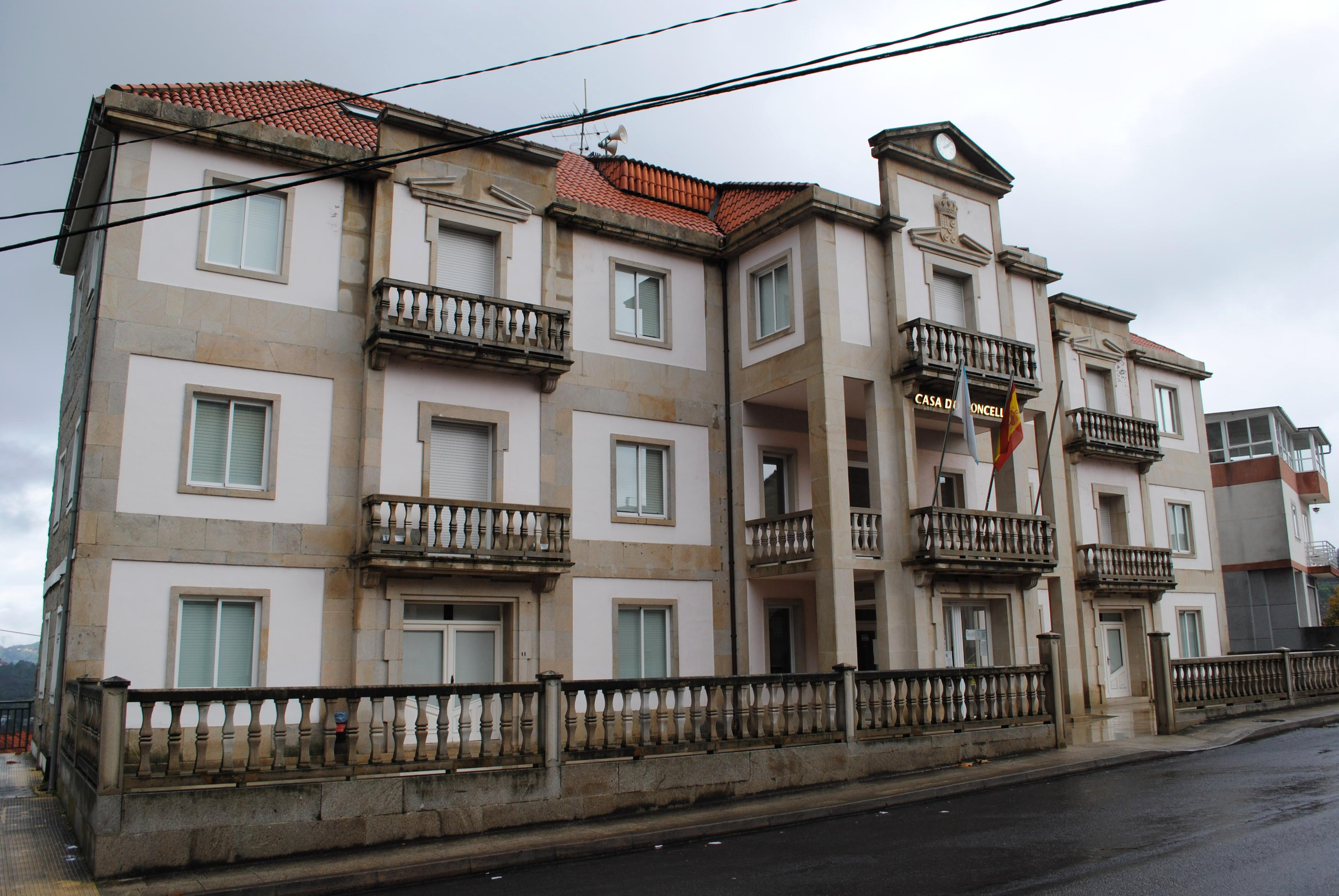
- Town hall

- Coat of arms

- Location in Spain Location in Galicia
- Coordinates: 42°18′1″N 7°54′23″W
- Country: Spain
- Autonomous community: Galicia
- Province: Ourense
- Comarca: Ourense

Government
  - Mayor: José Manuel Freire Couto (PP)

Area
  - Total: 30 km^{2} (12 sq mi)
- Elevation (AMSL): 206 m (676 ft)

Population (2025-01-01)
  - Total: 11,201
  - Density: 370/km^{2} (970/sq mi)
- Time zone: UTC+1 (CET)
  - Summer (DST): UTC+2 (CEST (GMT +2))
- Postal code: 32890
- Area code: +34 (Spain) + 988 (Orense)
- Website: www.barbadas.es

Barbadás is a municipality located in the northwest of the province of Ourense, in the autonomous community of Galicia, Spain. It belongs to the comarca of Ourense.
