= Castro Caldelas =

- municipality
- Flag Coat of arms

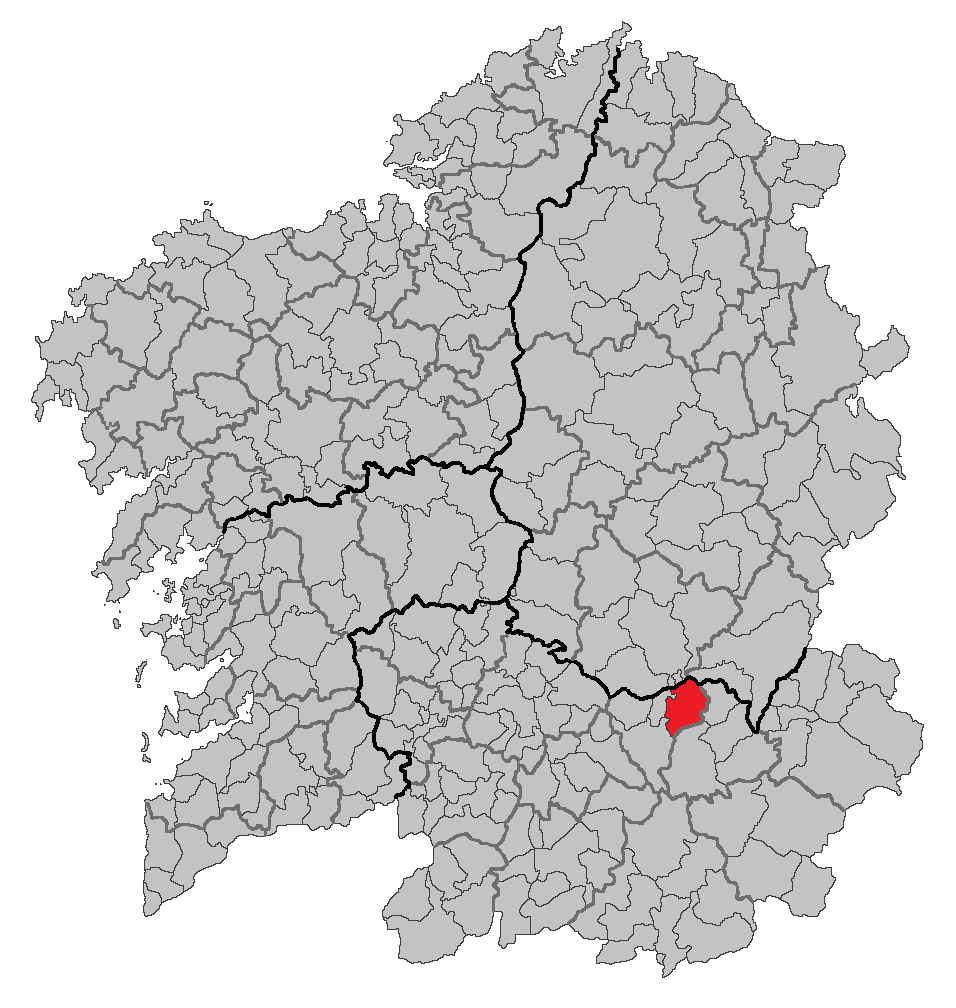
- Location in Galicia

- Location in Spain
- Coordinates: 42°23′N 7°26′W
- Country: Spain
- Autonomous community: Galicia
- Province: Ourense
- Comarca: Terra de Caldelas

Government
  - Mayor: Sara Inés Vega Núñez (PSOE)

Area
  - Total: 87.6 km^{2} (33.8 sq mi)
- Elevation: 763 m (2,503 ft)

Population (2025-01-01)
  - Total: 1,244
  - Density: 14.2/km^{2} (36.8/sq mi)
- Time zone: UTC+1 (CET)
  - Summer (DST): UTC+2 (CEST)
- INE municipality code: 32023
- Website: www.castrocaldelas.es

Castro Caldelas is a municipality in the province of Ourense, in the autonomous community of Galicia, Spain. It belongs to the comarca of Terra de Caldelas.

Its area is 87,6 km^{2}. Castro Caldelas is divided into 16 areas and 86 entities of population, with a population of 1,313 (INE 2016).

Its residents are called caldelaos.

== History ==
Archaeological evidence suggests that it was settled during the prehistoric and Roman periods. The Romans established a presence in the region, leaving behind ruins and artifacts that attest to their influence.

During the Middle Ages, Castro Caldelas was a part of the Kingdom of Galicia. It was strategically located, and a fortress or "castro" was built to defend the town and its surroundings. The castle of Castro Caldelas was constructed during this time and played a significant role in the history of the region.

Like many other places in Spain, Castro Caldelas was involved in the process of the Reconquista. During this time the town was subject to various battles and power struggles during this period.

Castro Caldelas continued to develop during the 16th and 17th centuries, with the construction of religious buildings and expansion of the town. The castle, which had been a defensive structure, also served as a noble residence during this time.

In the 19th and 20th centuries, Castro Caldelas, like many other towns, experienced social and economic changes which caused it to become an administrative and cultural center in the region.

Today, Castro Caldelas is known for its historical and cultural significance. The castle has been restored and is a prominent tourist attraction. The town is also famous for its winemaking traditions, with the Ribeira Sacra (DO) wine region nearby.
