= Toén =

- Municipality
- Flag Coat of arms

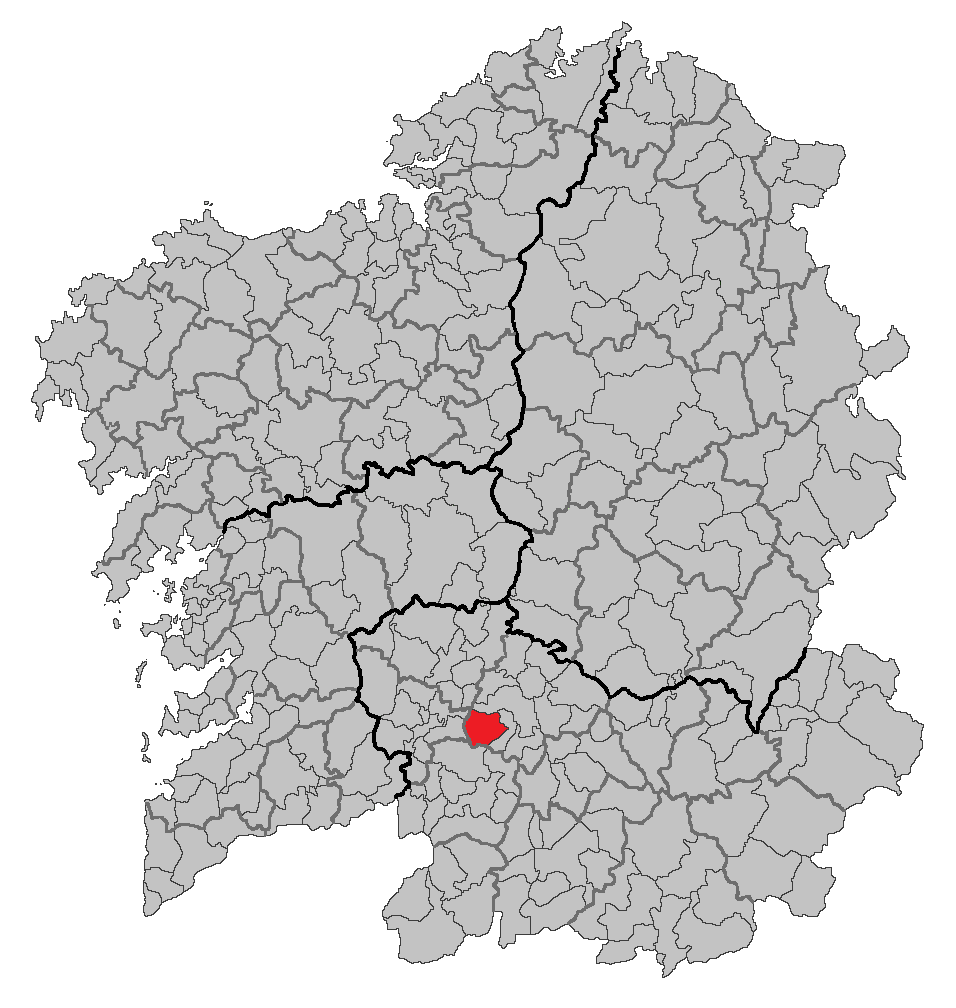
- Location in Galicia

- Location in Spain
- Coordinates: 42°19′N 7°57′W
- Country: Spain
- Autonomous community: Galicia
- Province: Ourense
- Comarca: Ourense

Government
  - Mayor: Ricardo Gónzalez (PP)

Area
  - Total: 58.3 km^{2} (22.5 sq mi)
- Elevation: 356 m (1,168 ft)

Population (2025-01-01)
  - Total: 2,327
  - Density: 39.9/km^{2} (103/sq mi)
- Time zone: UTC+1 (CET)
  - Summer (DST): UTC+2 (CEST)
- Website: www.toen.es/

Toén is a municipality in the province of Ourense, in the autonomous community of Galicia, Spain. It belongs to the comarca of Ourense. It has a population of 2649 (Spanish 2007 Census) and an area of 58 km².

== History ==
The population of Toén went through significant changes during the 20th century. At the beginning, in 1900, Toén had 3,881 inhabitants, with its maximum level of population in 1950 (4369 people). The main reason for the rise in population is because it is located near the provincial capital, Ourense. This slowed emigration, as happened in other Galician municipalities. Nevertheless, this was not enough to stop its decreasing population from 1950 to the present.
