= San Cibrao das Viñas =

- Municipality
- Coat of arms

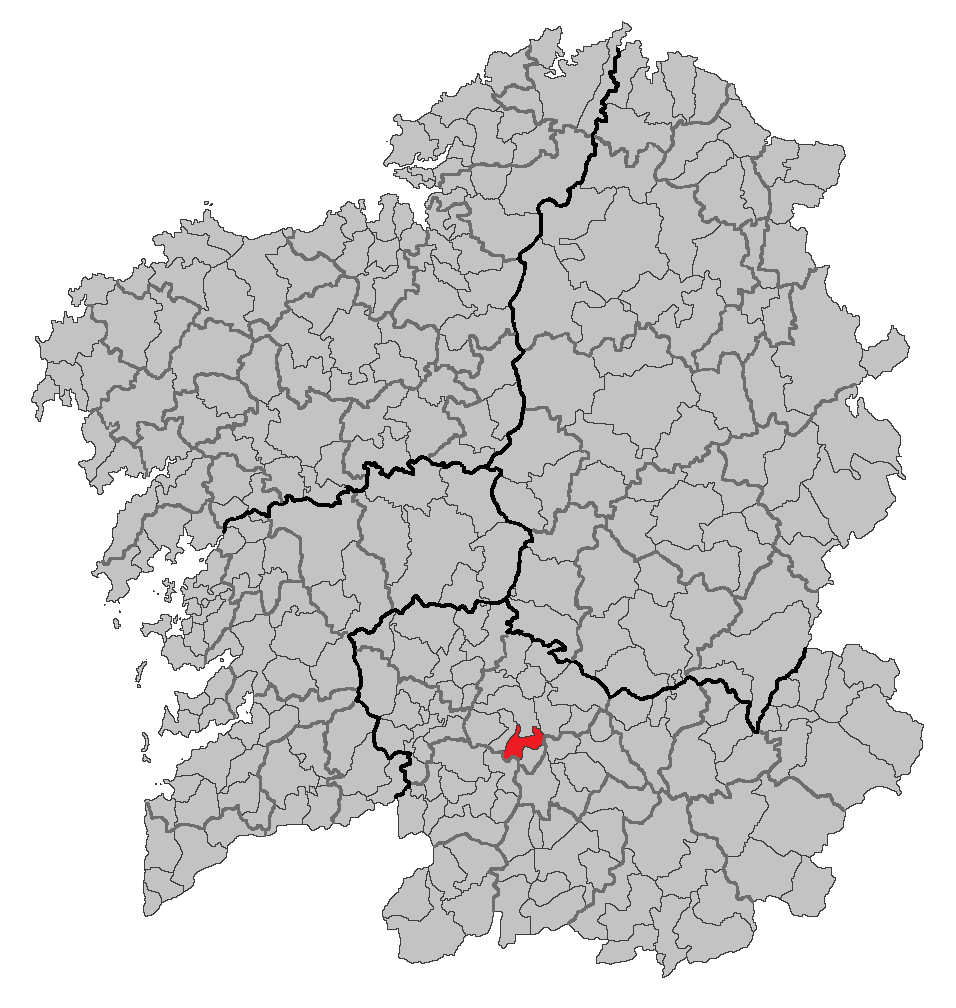
- Location in Galicia

- Location in Spain
- Coordinates: 42°17′49″N 7°52′17″W
- Country: Spain
- Autonomous community: Galicia
- Province: Ourense
- Comarca: Ourense

Government
  - Mayor: Manuel Pedro Fernández Moreiras (PP)

Area
  - Total: 39.5 km^{2} (15.3 sq mi)
- Elevation: 259 m (850 ft)

Population (2025-01-01)
  - Total: 5,751
  - Density: 146/km^{2} (377/sq mi)
- Time zone: UTC+1 (CET)
  - Summer (DST): UTC+2 (CEST)
- Website: sancibrao.es/

San Cibrao das Viñas is a municipality in the province of Ourense, in the autonomous community of Galicia, Spain. It belongs to the comarca of Ourense.

== Population ==
As of census 2023, San Cibrao das Viñas has a population of 5,692.
