= Coles, Ourense =

Coles
- municipality
- Coat of arms

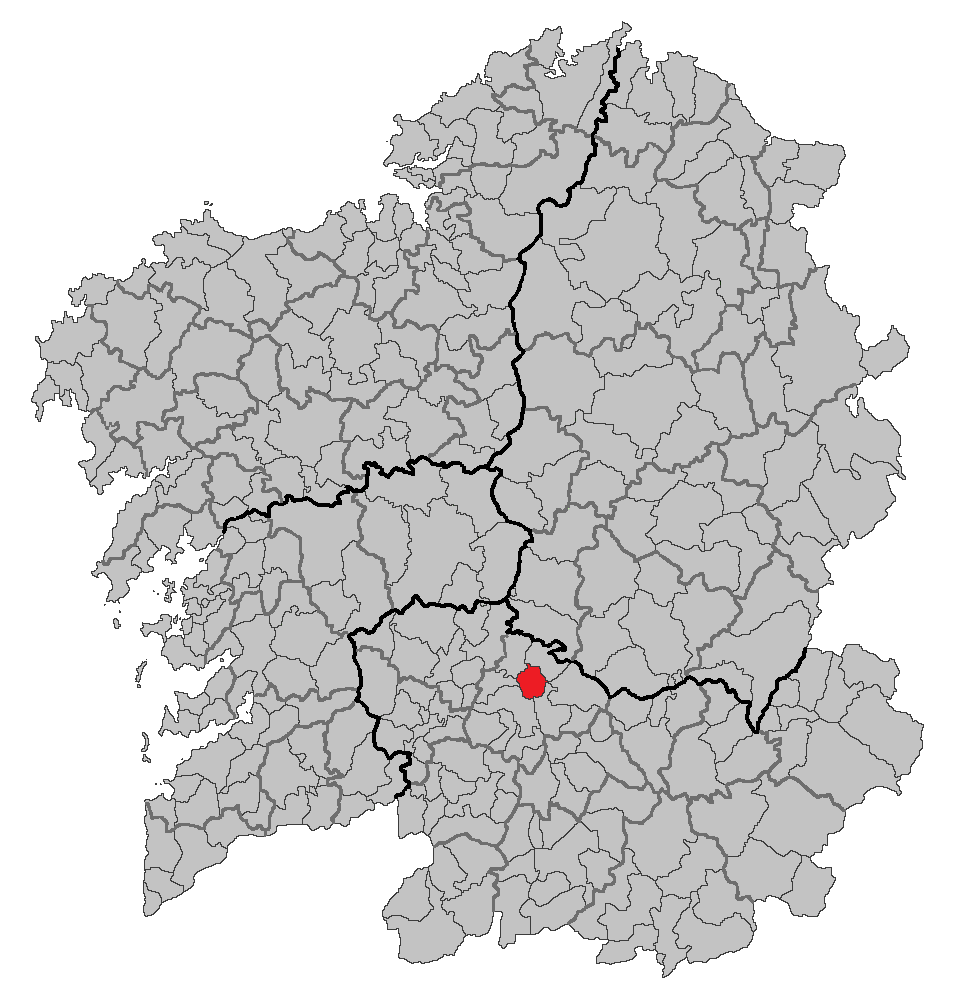
- Location in Galicia

- Location in Spain
- Coordinates: 42°24′8″N 7°50′23″W
- Country: Spain
- Autonomous community: Galicia
- Province: Ourense
- Comarca: Ourense

Government
  - Mayor: Manuel Rodríguez Vázque (Socialists' Party of Galicia)

Area
  - Total: 38.1 km^{2} (14.7 sq mi)
- Elevation: 386 m (1,266 ft)

Population (2025-01-01)
  - Total: 3,228
  - Density: 84.7/km^{2} (219/sq mi)
- Time zone: UTC+1 (CET)
  - Summer (DST): UTC+2 (CEST)
- INE municipality code: 32026
- Website: www.concellodecoles.gal

Coles is a municipality in the province of Ourense, in the autonomous community of Galicia, Spain. It belongs to the comarca of Ourense. It has a population of 3150 (2014) and an area of 38 km².
