= Province of Ourense =

Province of Spain

Coordinates: 42°10′N 7°30′W

Province of Ourense Provincia de Ourense (Galician) Provincia de Orense (Spanish)
- Province
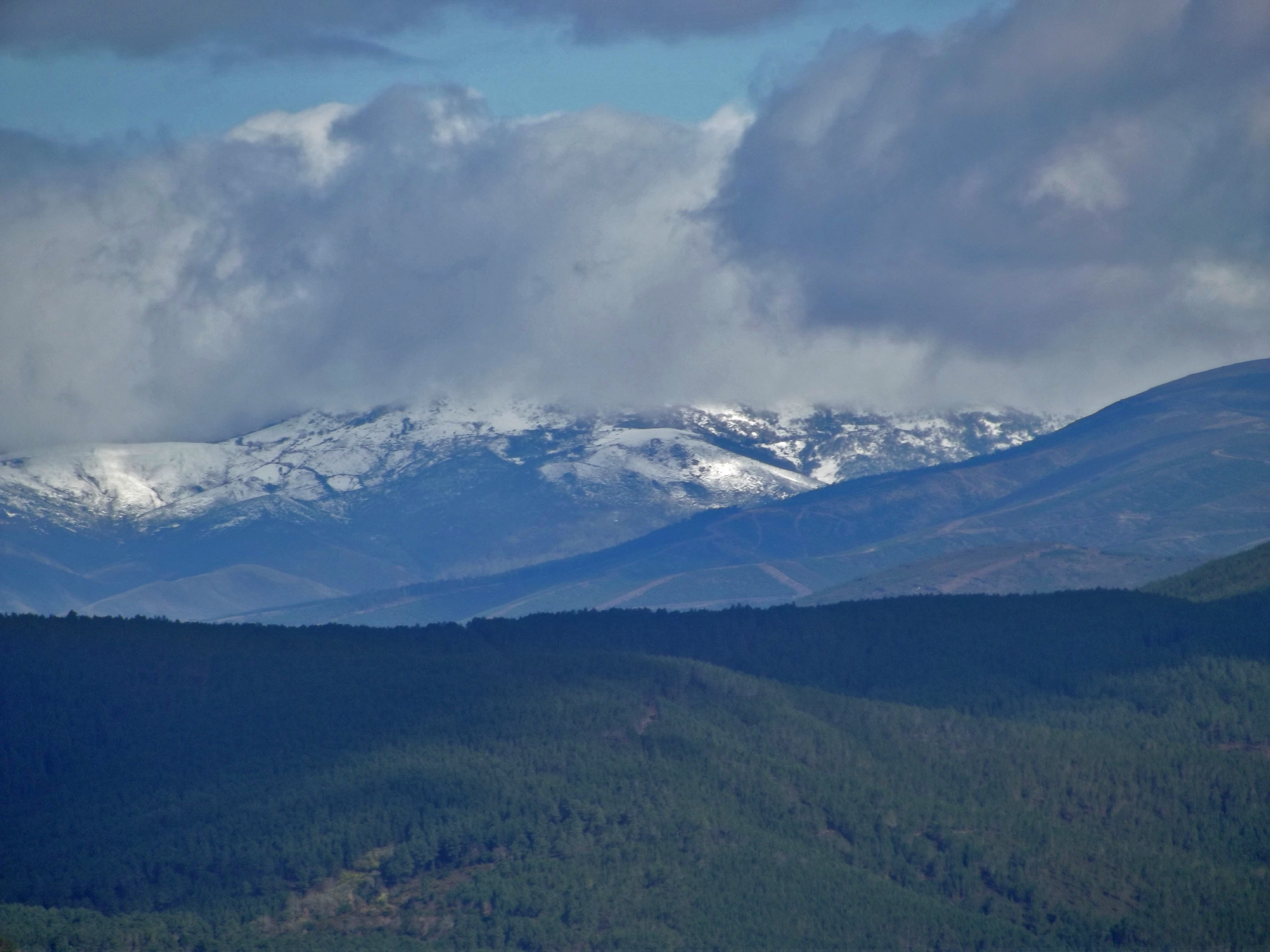
- Mount Neve

- Flag Coat of arms

- Location of the Province of Ourense in Spain
- Country: Spain
- Autonomous community: Galicia
- Capital: Ourense
- Municipalities: List: 92

Government
  - Body: Deputación de Ourense
  - President: José Manuel Baltar Blanco (PPdeG)

Area
  - Total: 7,274.68 km^{2} (2,808.77 sq mi)
  - Rank: 36th in Spain

Population (2025)
  - Total: 305,278
  - Rank: 41st in Spain
  - Density: 41.9645/km^{2} (108.687/sq mi)
- Demonym(s): ourensán (m), ourensá (f)
- Postal code: 32---
- ISO 3166 code: ES-OR
- Parliament: 14 deputies (out of 75)
- Congress: 4 deputies (out of 25)
- Senate: 4 senators (out of 19)
- Website: www.depourense.es

The Province of Ourense (Galician: [owˈɾɛnsɪ]; Spanish: Orense [oˈɾense]) is a province of Spain, in the southeastern part of the autonomous community of Galicia. The only landlocked province in Galicia, it is bordered by the provinces of Pontevedra to the west, Lugo to the north, León and Zamora, (which both belong to Castile and León) to the east, and by Portugal to the south. The provincial capital, Ourense, is the largest population centre, with the rest of the province being predominantly rural.

It has a population of 305,278 in an area of 7,274.68 square kilometres (2,808.77 sq mi) across its 92 municipalities.

== Name ==
Ourense (in Galician) is the official name according to Law 2/1998, 3 March. The usage of the Spanish spelling, Orense, is common outside Galicia.

== Geography ==
Ourense is surrounded by mountains on all sides. These mountains historically isolated the province from the more populated Galician coast. Until a highway was built in recent years linking Ourense with Vigo in the west and Benavente in the east, the only quick way for people to enter or leave the province was by railway.

The principal river system is the Miño-Sil, the fertile valleys of which produce corn (maize) and grapes for wine. Because of the many rapids, these rivers are not navigable, but they have been harnessed for hydroelectric power. The Sil flows through a deep canyon and has become a sought-after tourist site for its river cruises and views.

The Limia River begins north of Xinzo de Limia and flows south towards Portugal; the Lindoso reservoir is on this river as it crosses the border into Portugal. The Tâmega River, another important Portuguese river begins near Alberguería, north of Verín.

The mountainous terrain and isolation have kept the province economically challenged and encouraged much emigration to the rest of Spain and to the New World. There is some wine production along the Miño valley and near Verín. There is also considerable pig breeding and potato growing, especially around the area of Xinzo da Limia, in the drained lakebed of Antela, which until the 1960s was the largest fresh-water lake in Spain.

=== Protected areas ===
The province has several protected areas and some natural parks, including:

- Baixa Limia-Serra do Xures, near the border with Portugal
- Natural Park da Serra de Enciña da Lastra
- O Invernadeiro

== Municipalities ==
The province has 92 munipalities:

- A Arnoia
- A Bola
- A Gudiña
- A Merca
- A Mezquita
- A Peroxa
- A Pobra de Trives
- A Rúa
- A Teixeira
- A Veiga
- Allariz
- Amoeiro
- Avión
- Baltar
- Bande
- Baños de Molgas
- Barbadás
- Beade
- Beariz
- Boborás
- Calvos de Randín
- Carballeda de Avia
- Carballeda de Valdeorras
- Cartelle
- Castrelo de Miño
- Castrelo do Val
- Castro Caldelas
- Celanova
- Cenlle
- Chandrexa de Queixa
- Coles
- Cortegada
- Cualedro
- Entrimo
- Esgos
- Gomesende
- Larouco
- Laza
- Leiro
- Lobeira
- Lobios
- Maceda
- Manzaneda
- Maside
- Melón
- Montederramo
- Monterrei
- Muíños
- Nogueira de Ramuín
- O Barco de Valdeorras
- O Bolo
- O Carballiño
- O Irixo
- O Pereiro de Aguiar
- Oímbra
- Os Blancos
- Ourense
- Paderne de Allariz
- Padrenda
- Parada de Sil
- Petín
- Piñor
- Pontedeva
- Porqueira
- Punxín
- Quintela de Leirado
- Rairiz de Veiga
- Ramirás
- Ribadavia
- Riós
- Rubiá
- San Amaro
- San Cibrao das Viñas
- San Cristovo de Cea
- San Xoán de Río
- Sandiás
- Sarreaus
- Taboadela
- Toén
- Trasmiras
- Verea
- Verín
- Viana do Bolo
- Vilamarín
- Vilamartín de Valdeorras
- Vilar de Barrio
- Vilar de Santos
- Vilardevós
- Vilariño de Conso
- Xinzo de Limia
- Xunqueira de Ambía
- Xunqueira de Espadanedo

== Demographics ==
Historical population
Year	Pop.	±%
1842	315,270	—
1857	371,818	+17.9%
1877	397,976	+7.0%
1887	415,237	+4.3%
1900	419,665	+1.1%
1910	446,342	+6.4%
1920	466,398	+4.5%
1930	476,336	+2.1%
1940	494,966	+3.9%
1950	494,283	−0.1%
1960	488,241	−1.2%
1970	441,260	−9.6%
1981	430,159	−2.5%
1991	353,491	−17.8%
2001	338,446	−4.3%
2011	328,697	−2.9%
2021	305,297	−7.1%
Source: INE

As of 2025, the population is 305,278, of which 48.0% are male, and 52.0% are female. Minors make up 11.7% of the population, and seniors make up 32.3%.

=== Immigration ===
As of 2025, immigrants make up 15.8% of the population. The 5 largest foreign countries of birth are Venezuela, Portugal, Colombia, Switzerland, and Germany.

== Economy ==
Industries include chemical manufacture, milk production, water bottling near Verín, and clothing manufacture near the capital city of Ourense. One of the largest poultry processing companies is also located in the industrial zone near that city.

The province has also four wine regions, out of five in the whole region of Galicia. Ribeiro, Ribeira Sacra, Monterrei and Valdeorras.

Although not a major tourist center, tourism contributes somewhat to the economy. The river valleys attract holidaymakers, and there are several preserved medieval towns (Allariz and Ribadavia).

== See also ==
- Monterrei (DO)
- Galician wine
- Hot springs Ourense
