= List of castros in Galicia =

This is a list of castros in Galicia (Spain), ordered by provinces.

== Province of A Coruña ==
Name	Location	Image	Occupation Date	Observations
Castriño de Conxo	Conxo, Santiago de Compostela			
Castro of A Cidá	Carreira, Ribeira			
Castro of Achadizo	Boiro			
Castro of Agrafoxo	Rois			
Castro of Agronovo	Vedra			
Castro of Ameás	Abegondo			
Castro of Alvedro	Culleredo			
Castro of Ancos	Neda			
Castro of Armental	Cambre			
Castro of Bardaos	Tordoia			
Castro of Baroña	Baroña, Porto do Son		4th B.C. a 1st D.C. c.	Maritime castro, situated on a peninsula. It had two walls and remain 20 circular and oval houses.
Castro of Borneiro	Cabana de Bergantiños		4th century a.C.	
Castro of Brañas	Toques			
Castro of Calvario	Narón			
Castro Castelo dos Mouros	Ferrol			
Castro Croa de Fontá	Ferrol			
Castro A Croa de San Pedro de Leixa	Ferrol			
Castro of Duei	Rois			
Castro of Elviña	Elviña		3rd B.C. c.	
Castro of Fraís	Cambre			
Castro of Gosende	Cambre			
Castro of A Graña	Toques			
Castro of Illobre	Vedra			
Castro of Lobadiz	Ferrol			
Castro Lupario	Rois			Also known as Castro of Beca.
Castro of Marzán	Vedra			
Castro of Meirás	Sada			
Castro of Meixigo	Cambre			
Castro of Moares	Rois			
Castro of Neixón Grande	Boiro			
Castro of Neixón Pequeno	Boiro			
Castro of Oca	Coristanco			
Castro of Oín	Rois			
Castro of Papoi	Ferrol			
Castro of Picadizo	Rois			
Castro of Porto de Baixo	Carreira, Ribeira			
Castro of Punta dos Prados	Ortigueira			Also known as Castro of Espasante.
Castro of Pravio	Cambre			
Castro of Sésamo	Culleredo			
Castro of Sigrás	Cambre			
Castro of Socastro	Rois			
Castro of Sueiro	Culleredo			
Castro of Vigo	Cambre			
Castro of Vilar de Castro	Rois			
Castro of Vilela	Ferrol			

== Province of Lugo ==
Name	Location	Image	Occupation Date	Observations
Castro da Igrexa de Cazán	Xermade			
Castro da Torre	Folgoso do Courel			
Castro das Quenllas de O Forno	Guitiriz			
Castro of Abuíme	O Saviñao			
Castro of Ameixende	Castro de Rei			
Castro of Arroxo	Sober			
Castro of Arroxo da Fonsagrada	A Fonsagrada			
Castro of Baroncelle	Abadín			
Castro of Belesar	Vilalba			
Castro of Burela	Burela			
Castro of Cadeiras	Sober			
Castro of Castelo	Cervo			
Castro of Castromaior	Portomarín		4th Century B.C. to 1st Century A.D.	The Castro of Castromaior is one of the most important archaeological sites of the peninsular Northwest. There are a top enclosure that have attached others delimited by pits, parapets and walls forming a settlement of 5 (houses). Inhabited from S. IV B.C. to the I A.D. The recent excavations have discovered up to three different occupations, the most ancient with vegetable houses and the last one a strong house, in the beginning of the Roman conquest. Location (DD): 42.83309, -7.719837 ~5.5 miles (8.85 km) west of Portomarin
Castro of Ceranzos	Xove			
Castro of Santa María de Cervantes	Cervantes			
Castro of Codesido	Vilalba			
Castro of Donalbai	Begonte			
Castro of Duarría	Castro de Rei			
Castro of Fazouro	Foz			
Castro of Formigueiros	Samos			
Castro of Gondaísque	Vilalba			
Castro of Gundivós	Sober			
Castro of Ladra	Vilalba			
Castro of Moncelos	Abadín			
Castro of Morgadán	Carballedo			
Castro of Penas Agudas	Xove			
Castro of Rueta	Cervo			
Castro of San Ciprián	Cervo			
Castro do Torrillón	Xove			
Castro of Xoibán	Lugo			
Castro of Viladonga	Castro de Rei			
Castro of Vilar	Folgoso do Courel			
Castro of Vilaselán	Ribadeo			
Castro of Zoñán	Mondoñedo			

== Province of Ourense ==
Name	Location	Image	Occupation Date	Observations
Castro of A Coroa	A Rúa			
Castro of O Grou	A Xironda, San Salvador, Cualedro			Actually in the Portuguese municipality bordering Montalegre.
Castro dos Mallos	Rebordondo, San Martiño, Cualedro		Iron Age / Roman	
Castro of Montes	Montes, Santa Baia, Cualedro		Iron Age	Also known as A Cidá.
Castro of Carzoá	Carzoá, San Roque, Cualedro		Iron Age / Roman / Medieval	Also known as A Cidá.
Castro of As Chairas	Lucenza, Santa María, Cualedro			
Castro of Montecelo	Lucenza, Santa María, Cualedro		Iron Age	
Castro da Igresiña dos Mouros	Lucenza, Santa María, Cualedro		Iron Age	
Castro of Saceda	Lucenza, Santa María, Cualedro		Iron Age	Also known as A Cidá.
Castro of San Millao	San Millao, San Millao, Cualedro		Iron Age	Also known as A Cidá.
Castro of Armeá	Augas Santas, Allariz			
Castro of Castromao	Celanova			
Castro of Vilachá	Boborás			
Castro of Meimón	Boborás			
Castro of Astureses	Boborás			
Castro of Moldes	Boborás			
Castro da Cameixa	Boborás			
Castro of San Cibrao de Lás	Las, San Amaro		2nd B.C. to 2nd D.C.	Also known as A Cidade, this is one of the largest castros in Galicia.
Castro of San Tomé	Ourense			
Castro of Torre da Cidá	Nogueira de Ramuín			
Castro of Baños de Banga	O Carballiño			
Castro of San Facundo	O Carballiño			
Castro of Cornedo	O Carballiño			
Castro of Orros	O Carballiño			Also known as A Cidá
Castro of Outeiro de Castro	O Carballiño			
Castro of Souteliño	O Carballiño			
Castro do Coto do Mosteiro	Lobás, O Carballiño			Partially excavated
Castro of Ventosela	Ribadavia			
Castro de Santa Cristina	Ribadavia			
Castro of Trelle	Toén			
Castro of Taboadela	Taboadela			
Castro of Sande	Cartelle			
Castro of Reádegos	Vilamarín			

== Province of Pontevedra ==
Name	Location	Image	Occupation Date	Observations
Castro of Casasoa	Rodeiro			
Castro of Centelle	Rodeiro			
Castro of Covelo	Covelo			
Castro of Devesa	Rodeiro			
Castro of Donramiro	Lalín			
Castro of O Facho de Donón	Cangas do Morrazo			Important Gallaecian-Roman sanctuary where was worshiped to the god Berobreo. Is the site where it found a greater number of votive interests of the entire Iberian Peninsula.
Castro of Maceira	Covelo			
Castro of the San Martiño Island	Cíes Islands, Vigo			
Castro of Monte da Guía	Vigo			
Castro of Vigo	Vigo			
Castro of O Castelo	Viana do Bollo			
Castro of Mouriscados	Mouriscados, Mondariz			
Castro of Pinceiras	Gondomar			
Castro of Pontellas	O Porriño			
Castro of San Amaro	Salvaterra de Miño			
Castro of San Miguel	A Estrada			
Castro of Santa Trega	A Guarda			
Castro da Croa	Ponteareas			
Castro of Troña	Ponteareas			
Castro da Fozara	Ponteareas			Also known as castro da Cividade.
Castro of Xián	Gondomar			
Castro dos Cubos	Tui			

== See also ==
- List of castros in Asturias
- List of castros in Cantabria
- List of castros in Castile and León
- List of castros in the Basque country
- Castro culture
- Castros in Spain
