= Bautista Álvarez =

Galician politician and historian

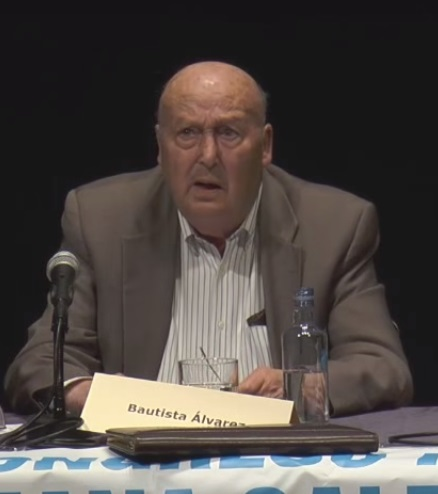
Álvarez in 2014

Bautista Goyel Álvarez Domínguez (1933 – 16 September 2017) was a Galician nationalist politician and historian. He was born in San Amaro, Spain. Álvarez, who was a founding member of the Galician People's Union in 1964, also served as the Galician political party's President from 1964 through 1977.

Álvarez died of a heart attack on 16 September 2017 at his sister's home in Beariz, Spain at the age of 84.
