= Iago López (sailor) =

Spanish Olympic sailor

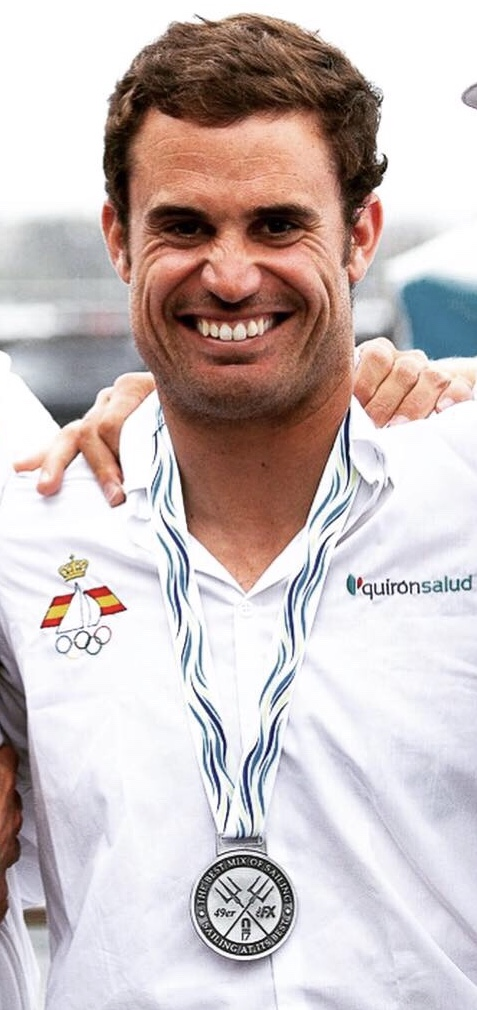

Personal information
- Full name: Iago López Marra
- Born: 7 April 1990 (age 36) Portosín, Spain
- Height: 181 cm (5 ft 11 in)
- Weight: 80 kg (176 lb)

Sailing career
- Sport: Sailing
- Class: 49er
Medal record
Sailing
Representing Spain
World Championships
Silver medal – second place	2020 Australia	49er
European Championships
Gold medal – first place	2016 Barcelona	49er
Gold medal – first place	2018 Gdynia	49er
Bronze medal – third place	2020 Weymouth	49er

Iago López Marra (Note: In this Spanish name, the first or paternal surname is López and the second or maternal family name is Marra.) (born 7 April 1990 in Portosín, Galicia) is a Spanish sailor. He started sailing in his hometown of Portosín at age twelve. He later moved to Santander and teamed with Diego Botín. The duo placed 9th at the 2016 Summer Olympics and 4th at the 2020 Summer Olympics.

== Early life ==
López began sailing at the age of 11 at the Real Club Náutico Portosín competing in the Optimist 420 and 470 classes.

== Career ==
When he was 18, he joined the High-Performance Sailing Center of Santander, where he combined regattas with his studies in naval engineering.

In the 2013 season, he was part of the crew of the Swan 80, Plis Play, which won the Fastnet Race in Plymouth.

During the 2014 season, he was a member of the 100-foot super maxi Esimit / Europa which performed on the Mediterranean circuit.

He was a team member for the Spanish SailGP team and Star Sailors League. He competed in the 69F and A classes, in which he won vice-champion at Spain 2020 and champion at France 2021.

In the 2022 season, he began the year aboard the Comanche, skippered by Mitch Booth, winning the RORC 2022 transatlantic and IMA Trophy. The Comanche set a new race record for the 3,000 nautical mile course from Lanzarote to Granada of 7 days, 22 hours, 1 minute, and 4 seconds. The new record broke the previous record by more than two days.

== International results ==
49er
World Championship
Year	Place	Medal	Class
2020	Geelong (Australia)	2nd place, silver medalist(s)	49er
European Championship
Year	Place	Medal	Class
2016	Barcelona (Spain)	1st place, gold medalist(s)	49er
2018	Gdynia (Poland)	1st place, gold medalist(s)	49er
2019	Weymouth (United Kingdom)	3rd place, bronze medalist(s)	49er
Oceania Championship
Year	Place	Medal	Class
2018	Auckland (New Zealand)	2nd place, silver medalist(s)	49er
2019	Geelong (Australia)	1st place, gold medalist(s)	49er
World Cup
year	Place	Medal	Class
2017	Hyères (France)	1st place, gold medalist(s)	49er
2016	Miami (United States)	1st place, gold medalist(s)	49er
2017	Miami (United States)	3rd place, bronze medalist(s)	49er
Other regatas
Kiel Week
Year	Place	Medal	Class
2019	Kiel (Germany)	3rd place, bronze medalist(s)	49er
Princesa Sofia
Year	Place	Medal	Class
2016	Palma (Spain)	3rd place, bronze medalist(s)	49er
2017	Palma (Spain)	2nd place, silver medalist(s)	49er
2019	Palma (Spain)	2nd place, silver medalist(s)	49er
Delta Lloyd
Year	Place	Medal	Class
2016	Medemblijk (Netherlands)	1st place, gold medalist(s)	49er
