= Piñor =

- municipality
- Coat of arms

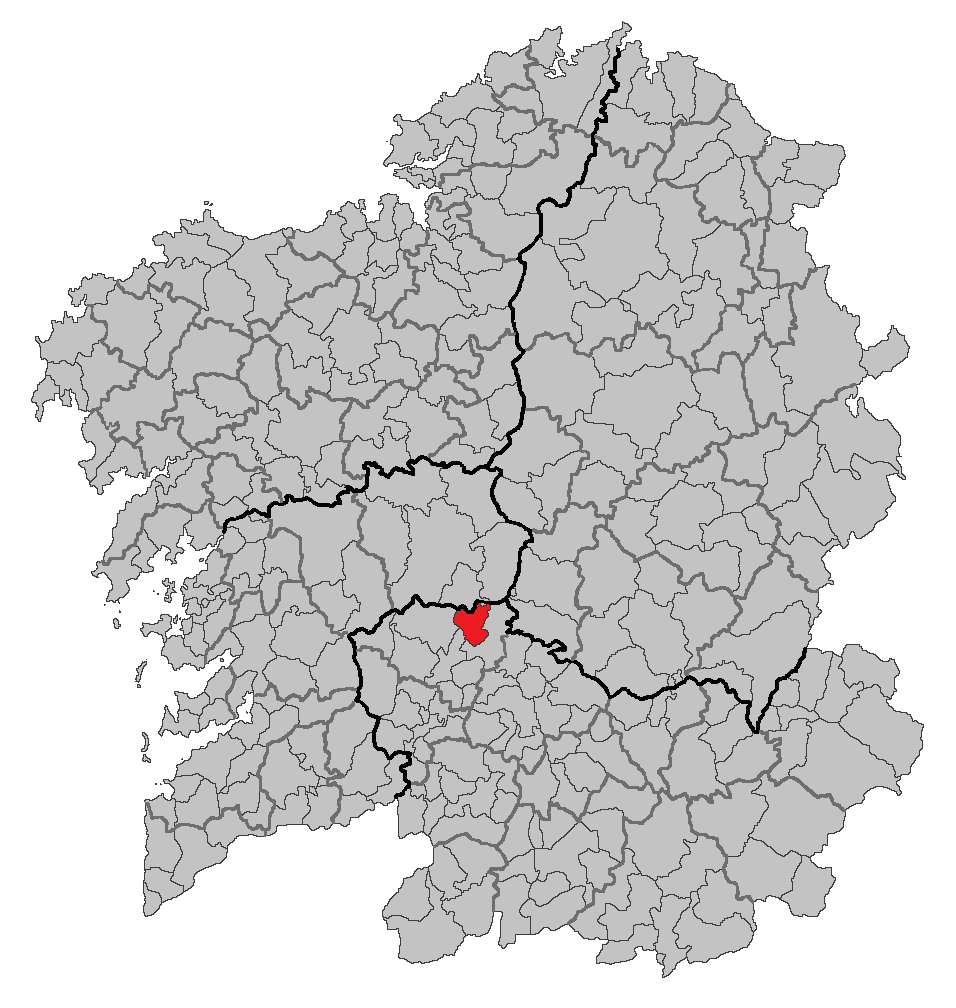
- Location in Galicia

- Location in Spain
- Coordinates: 42°29′52″N 8°00′18″W
- Country: Spain
- Autonomous community: Galicia
- Province: Ourense
- Comarca: O Carballiño

Government
  - Mayor: José Luis González (PP)

Area
  - Total: 52.7 km^{2} (20.3 sq mi)
- Elevation: 570 m (1,870 ft)

Population (2025-01-01)
  - Total: 1,103
  - Density: 20.9/km^{2} (54.2/sq mi)
- Time zone: UTC+1 (CET)
  - Summer (DST): UTC+2 (CEST)
- Postal Code: 32137
- Website: www.pinor.es

Piñor is a municipality in the province of Ourense, in the autonomous community of Galicia, Spain. It belongs to the comarca of O Carballiño. It has a population of 1552 (Spanish 2001 Census) and an area of 53 km².
