= Castro de Baroña =

Coordinates: 42.6949°N 9.0322°W

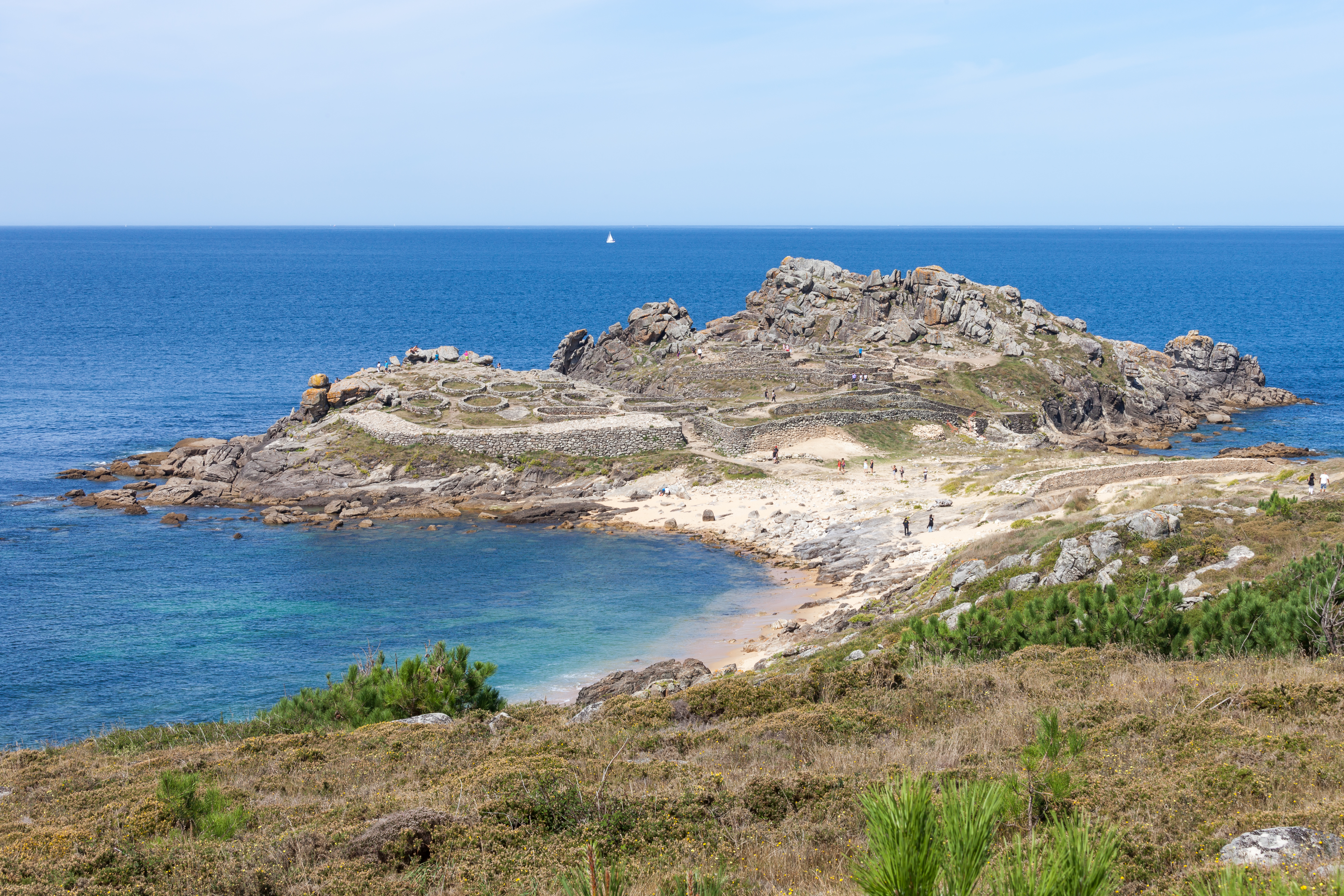
- Castro de Baroña in 2014
- Interactive map of Castro de Baroña
- Periods: Iron Age
- Location: Porto do Son, Galicia, Spain

History
- Built: 1st Century BC
- Abandoned: 1st Century AD

Site notes
- Public access: Yes

The Castro de Baroña is an Iron Age fortified settlement located in the parish of Baroña, a municipality of Porto do Son in the province of A Coruña (Galicia, Spain. GPS Co-ordinates: 42°41'41.40"N 9°1'57.10"W). The settlement, surrounded by two walls and containing twenty roundhouses that still remain today, was built on a peninsula and inhabited from the 1st century BC to the 1st century AD.

== Description ==
A moat four metres wide by three metres deep, forming the first line of defence, was dug into the isthmus that connects the town to the fort. Beyond this, there is a rampart consisting of two almost parallel stone walls filled with sand and stone. It is thought that this rampart originally connected to the town walls, creating an area most likely without housing. The main wall is well preserved and has two sides, the one on the right is made up of three gradually rising stone walls, and the one on the left is similar to that of the isthmus. To the right of the entrance there was a defensive tower where the walls narrowed, so it is assumed that it was shut with a gate to prevent the passage of carts. It is possible that the wall previously surrounded the entire fort. There is a sloped entrance that leads into the interior living space, which is divided into four separate parts. In the first, it is debated whether the construction on the left is either a long bench or a single fallen pillar. Within this building a fireplace, some earthenware artefacts and a hole for a post were found, indicating it could have been a forge. Set against the gate, there are other oval shaped structures with a hall and another that could have been a forge.

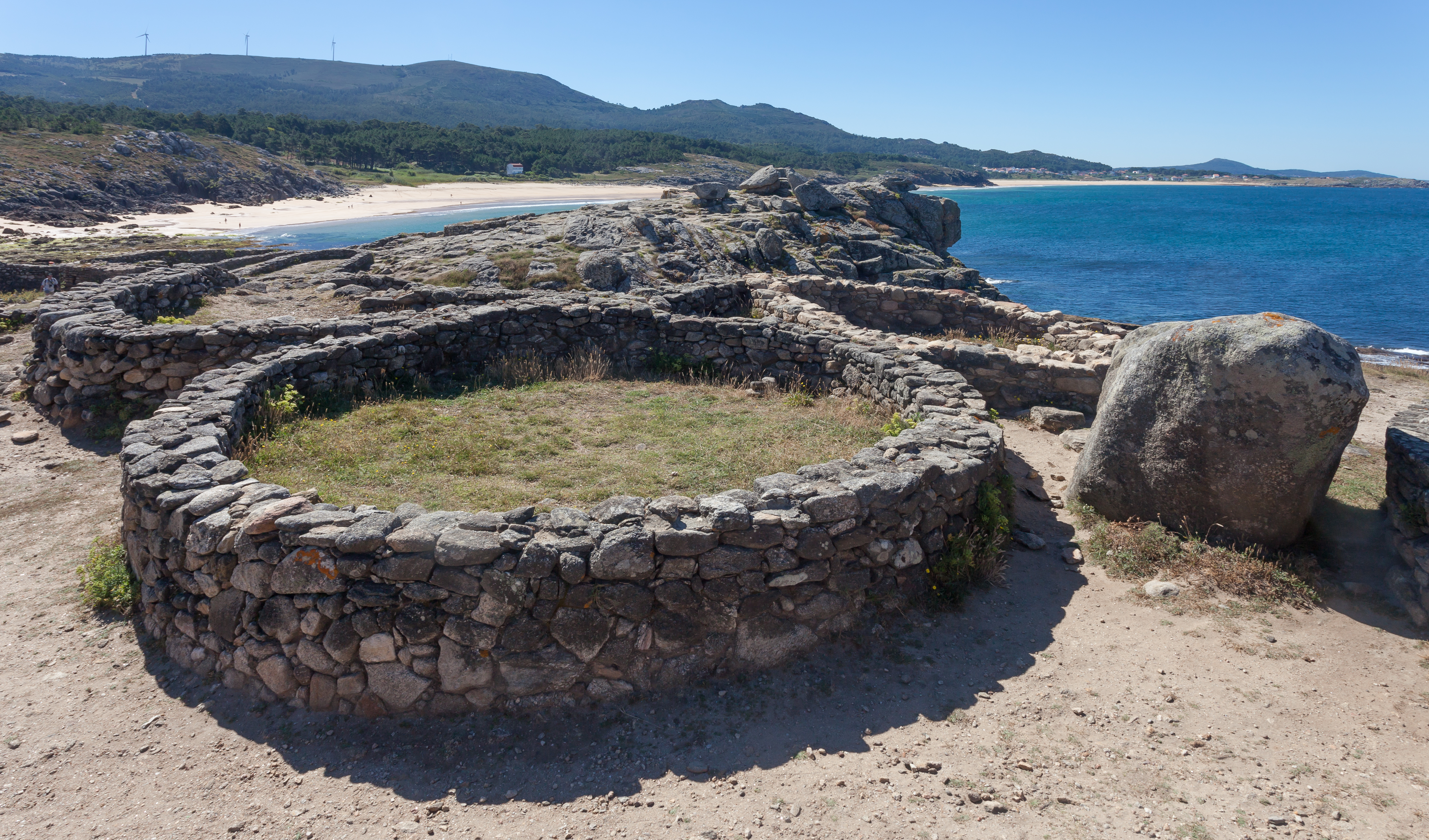
Roundhouses on the top of the hill fort.

The next section is separated by a retaining wall and is reached by some stairs, which are the best preserved of all Galician forts. This section contains a group of houses forming an area sheltered from the wind. A trail leads to the highest part of the town where there are other surviving structures. Evidence suggests the town was self-sufficient. Inside the fort there was no water, springs or wells, thus there was the need to source water elsewhere. It is thought that food came primarily from the sea, and so basically consisted in shellfish and fish. They also ate cattle, goats, sheep and acorns. At the site there are remains of metalwork, masonry and textiles.

== Archaeological investigations ==
The Castro de Baroña was first excavated in 1933 by Sebastián González-García. The subsequent excavations were carried out by J. M. Luengo (1969-1970), Francisco Calo Lourido and Teresa Soeiro (1980 to 1984). Ánxel Concheiro (1984) and Francisco Calo (1985) reinforced the structural integrity of the fort, and a new round of excavations and renovations was started on May 21, 2012.

== See also ==
- List of castros in Galicia
- Castro culture
