= Noia (comarca) =

Coordinates: 42°45′59″N 8°54′33″W

- Comarca
- Flag Coat of arms
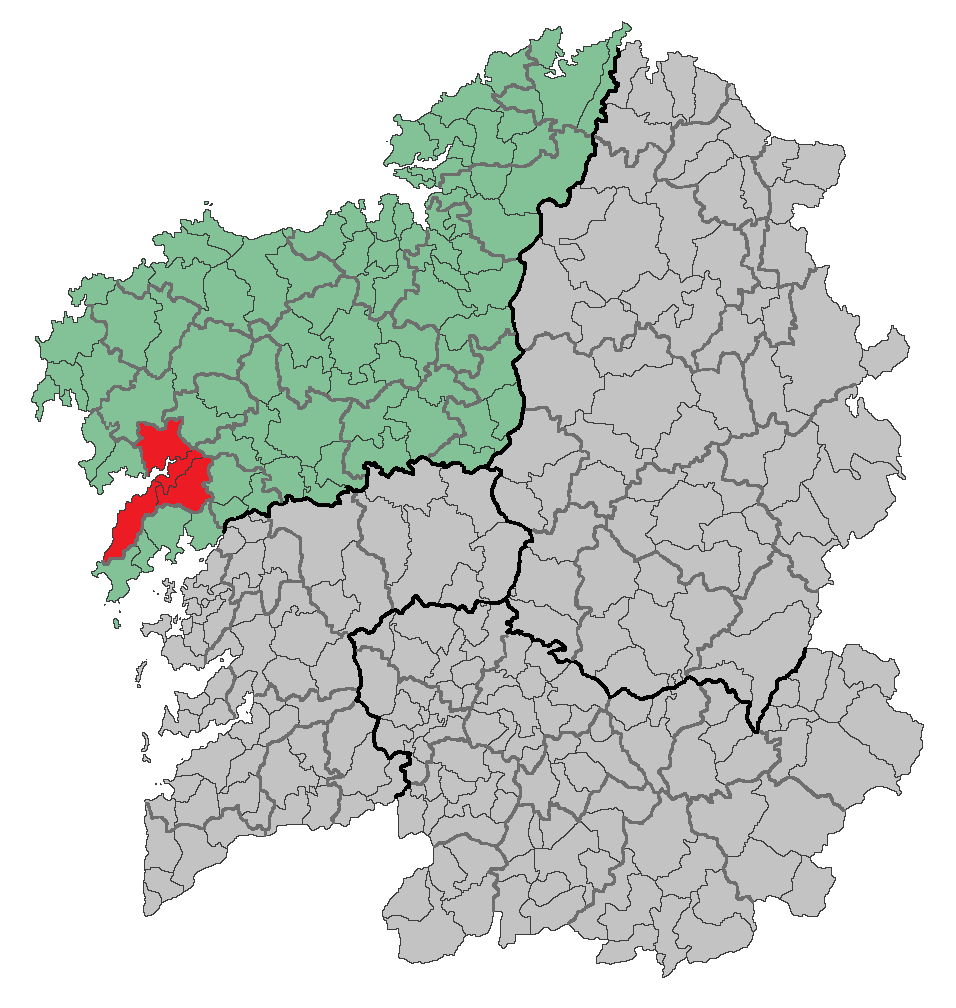
- Country: Spain
- Autonomous community: Galicia
- Province: A Coruña
- Capital: Noia
- Municipalities: List: Lousame, Noia, Outes, Porto do Son

Area
  - Total: 324.7 km^{2} (125.4 sq mi)

Population
  - Total: 33,054
  - Density: 101.8/km^{2} (263.7/sq mi)
- Demonym: Noiés
- Time zone: UTC+1 (CET)
  - Summer (DST): UTC+2 (CEST)

Noia is a comarca in the Galician Province of A Coruña. The overall population of this local region is 33,054 (2019).

== Municipalities ==
Lousame, Noia, Outes and Porto do Son.
