= Castro of Santa Trega =

Archaeological site in Spain

Coordinates: 41.8927°N 8.8698°W

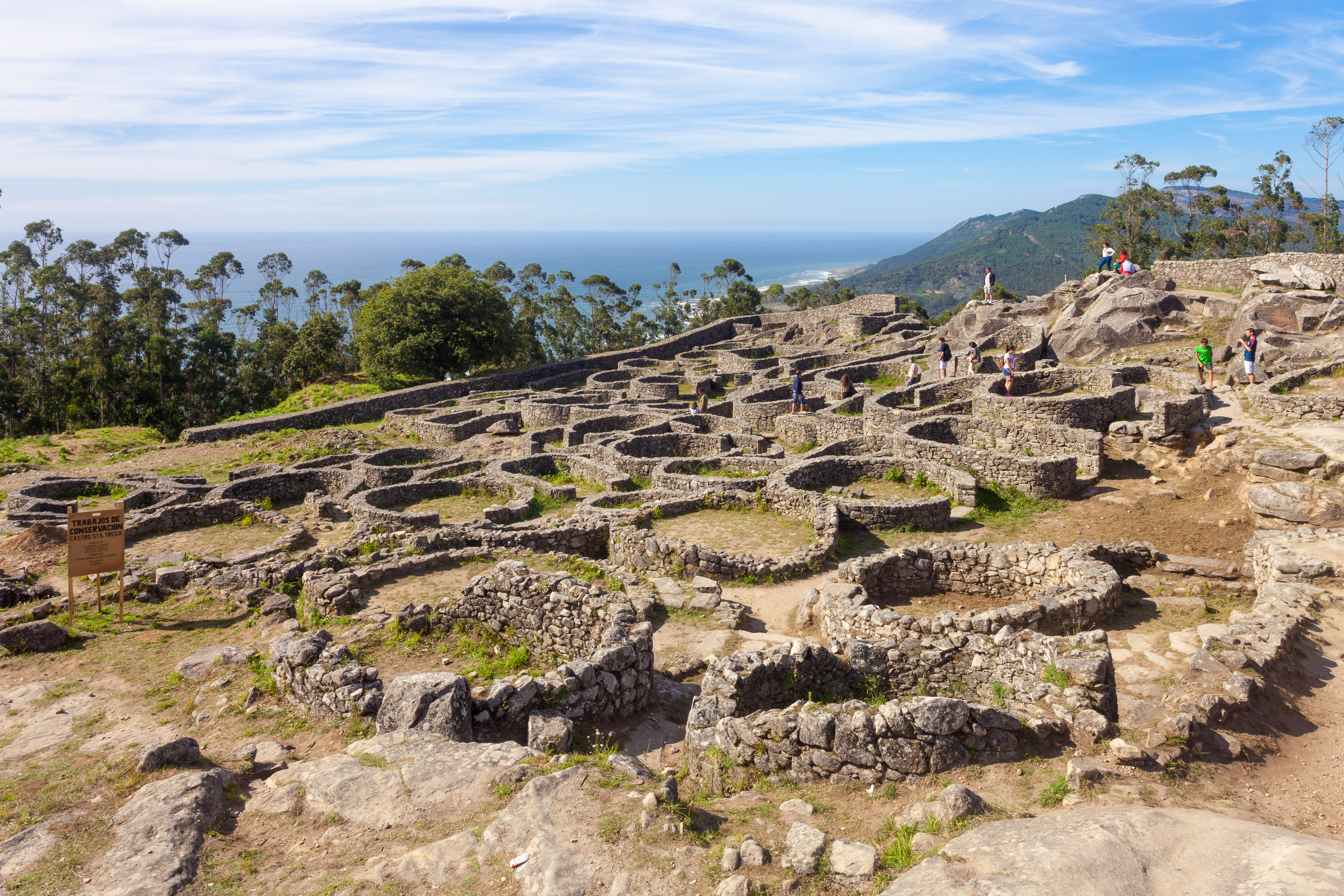
View of the site from the road

The Castro of Santa Trega is an archaeological site on the hillsides of Mount Santa Trega, in the southwestern Galician municipality of A Guarda, Spain. The site is strategically located overlooking the mouth of the river Miño, at 341 meters (1118 feet) above sea level. Belonging to the Castro culture, it is one of the most emblematic and visited Galician forts (castros).

In 1931, it was declared a National Historical and Artistic Monument ('Monumento Histórico Artístico Nacional') and was also considered a Place of Cultural Interest ('Bien de Interés Cultural': BIC).

== Castro settlers ==
According to classical authors such as Pliny the Elder, Pomponius Mela, Appian and Ptolemy, the southwest corner of modern-day Galicia was populated by the Grovii or Grovios community, their most important city being the Castellum Tyde or Tude (now Tui). Archaeological findings show that the town would have had similar sized constructions; would have been peaceful; and would have supported an agrarian economy with certain purchasing and commercial power (as demonstrated by the abundance of foreign products).

== Description ==
Santa Trega is a 'Castro-Roman' settlement. It was inhabited between 100 BC and 100 AD, in a period when the process of Romanisation of the northwest of the Iberian Peninsula had already begun. Despite this, the construction system reflects techniques that respect the Castro tradition and has seen very little Roman influence. This style is dominated by the use of circular structures. Only a small percentage of the estimated size of the settlement has been excavated so far. At present only the northern part, excavated in the 1980s, and some structures at the top of the mountain are open to visitors. It is bordered by a wall surrounding a stretch of land more than 700 metres (2300 feet) north-south by 300 metres (984 feet) east-west. However, these measurements are not confirmed to be accurate.

=== The wall ===
The layout of the wall marks the limit of the settlement with respect to its surroundings rather than having a defensive or deterrent function. The wall is made of stones strengthened with clay with a maximum thickness of 160 cm (63 inches) and lacks a foundation.

=== The stone buildings ===
Almost all the stone structures are free-standing dwellings with circular or oval foundations. A few houses have a rectangular floor plan, usually with arched corners. The thickness of the dwelling walls is usually quite uniform, about 40 centimetres (15 inches) on average, with the better finished wall to the outside. The vast majority of these houses are small and sit directly on the bedrock with their walls being covered with a lime and sand mortar. Traces of pigmentation found indicate that the plaster on the walls would have been tinted different colours. Many of the dwellings have a foyer, considered by experts to be a sign of Mediterranean influence adapted to maintain the characteristics of indigenous construction. Many monolithic door jambs and lintels have been found decorated with intertwined geometric shapes and rope-like moulding. In addition, embedded in the walls, small cylindrical monolithic blocks have been found decorated with geometric shapes such as spirals, triskelions, Celtic roses, or pinwheel designs. Other elements such as plinths present similar decorations in addition to representations of animals. Archaeological findings do not support the traditionally observed system of a conical roof supported by a central post. In the place where a hole to fix the central post would have been found, archaeologists instead discerned evidence of 'lareiras' or hearths, suggesting a roofing system that distributes the weight directly onto the walls rather than a post. Not all of the stone structures discovered at Castro de Santa Trega served a residential purpose. In particular, one type of building appears to be storehouses which possess a less elaborate and less careful construction than the neighbouring houses. Inside these buildings, remains of amphoras, a mill, carving stones, etc. were found. The urban distribution of the settlement is characterized by groups of buildings forming individualized clusters. These clusters are known as "family or household units" and are formed by dwellings and storehouses set around a small, often paved, communal courtyard. The site's urban planning includes a complex network of rainwater drainage channels under the pathways, or sometimes on the surface, sculpted into the bedrock and covered with slabs. Sometimes these waters were channelled into tanks built into the rock and covered with a weatherproof mortar.

=== The petroglyphs ===
Proof of human presence approximately 2,000 years before the settlement was built is confirmed by petroglyphs or rock engravings in various locations. Many of these petroglyphs were concealed by structures raised during the construction of the fort. The 'Laja del Mapa', also known as the 'Laja Sagrada' (Sacred Rock), is the best known of the geometric representations that are still visible. Situated on the highest part of the hill, the engraving is made up of various spirals, concentric circles and roughly parallel lines. It is evident that these engravings have no relation to the fort, since they are a product of a society that developed 2,000 years before, during the final stage of the Galician Neolithic period.

=== Discovered materials ===
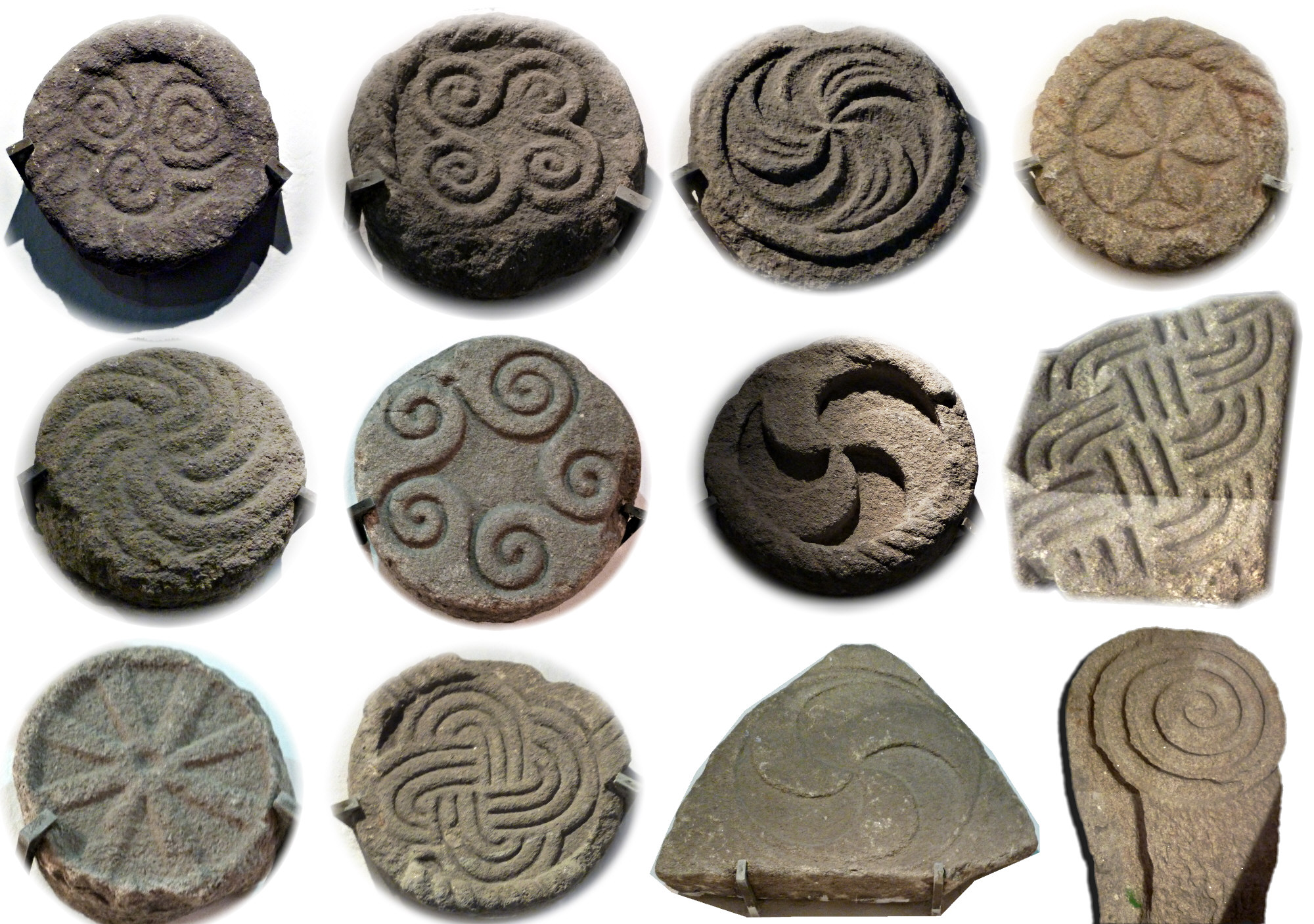
Stone carvings found in the castro

As at many Galician forts, a large quantity of ceramics has been recovered. There are examples of both indigenous ceramics, identified by their dark paste moulded by hand or slow wheel, and varieties of pottery typical of the Roman era. There have also been many discoveries of pieces of Roman glass in many shapes and colours and even glass necklace beads and game tokens. With regards to metal artefacts, pieces of pots, bronze situlas and flat-blade knives were uncovered. Evidence of goldsmithing has also been recovered, in two gold-plated torc end-pieces.

== Archaeological excavations ==
In 1862, the first recorded archaeological discovery was a bronze sculpture of Hercules found by stonemasons. The first written references to the ruins are in the archaeological notes of Ramón López García (1864) and also in Manuel Murguía's work History of Galicia (1888), in which he draws a link between the ruins and the Celtic Gaul tribes. In 1912, the Pro-Monte Society of Santa Tecla was created in A Guarda. From 1914 to 1923, the director of the archaeological excavations was Ignacio Calvo. He was the first to call it a 'citania' (fortified city) and the first to speak about the possibility of identifying the site with the mythical "Mount Medulio", where classical writers placed the legendary and heroic last Gallaecian resistance against the Roman Empire. Between 1928 and 1933, Cayetano de Mergelina y Luna, professor at the University of Valladolid, led a series of archaeological campaigns using some of the most advanced methods at that time. The campaigns mainly focused on the western hillside and were able to expose a large number of houses and other buildings. Between 1933 and 1979, the site was totally abandoned despite it having been declared a National Monument in 1931.

In 1983, with the economic support of the Galician government and the municipal government of A Guarda, the archaeologist Antonio de la Peña Santos led a team from the Museum of Pontevedra which began systematically excavating the site. These excavations were mainly concentrated in the northern corner of the settlement. The structures that were discovered during these excavations, along with those discovered in previous campaigns, were consolidated in the same year by a team led by Montserrat García Lastra Merino.

== See also ==
- Castro culture
- Gallaeci
- List of castros in Galicia
