= Maside =

- Municipality
- Flag Coat of arms

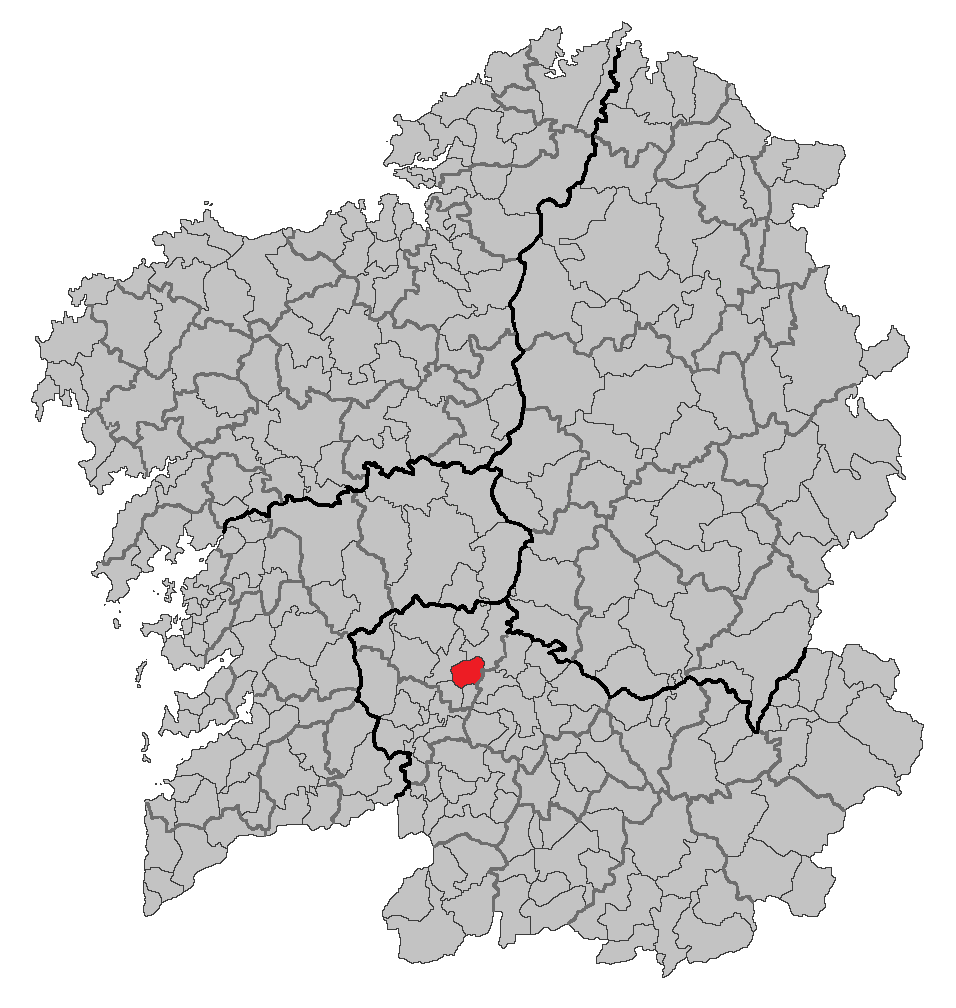
- Location in Galicia

- Location in Spain
- Coordinates: 42°24′47″N 8°01′27″W
- Country: Spain
- Autonomous community: Galicia
- Province: Ourense
- Comarca: O Carballiño

Government
  - Mayor: José Manuel Iglesias Araújo (PSdeG-PSOE)

Area
  - Total: 40.0 km^{2} (15.4 sq mi)
- Elevation: 378 m (1,240 ft)

Population (2025-01-01)
  - Total: 2,768
  - Density: 69.2/km^{2} (179/sq mi)
- Time zone: UTC+1 (CET)
  - Summer (DST): UTC+2 (CEST)
- Website: Official website

Maside is a municipality in the province of Ourense, in the autonomous community of Galicia, Spain. It belongs to the comarca of O Carballiño.
