= Grovii =

Ancient Portuguese tribe

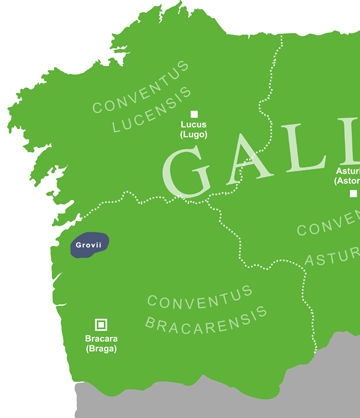
Map of Gallaecia

The Grovii or Gravii were an ancient Gallaeci tribe who inhabited the low valley of the Minho river, present day Portugal and Galicia (Spain), and also along the coast near the rivers Avo, Celadus, Nebis and Limia, northern Portugal.

== Origin and History ==
Pomponius Mela stated that all the people living along the coast of Gallaecia were Celtic, with the exception of the Grovii, while Pliny wrote that they had a Greek origin. Anyhow, E.R. Luján, studying their onomastics, couldn't conclude on their non-Celtiness, since their anthroponyms and toponyms could be Celtic.

Their main settlement was Tude, present day Tui, Pontevedra, by the border with Portugal along the Minho river. The non-localized oppidum of Avobriga and Lambriaca were located near the Grovii lands.

== See also ==
- Pre-Roman peoples of the Iberian Peninsula
- Castro of Santa Trega
