= O Porto do Son =

- Municipality
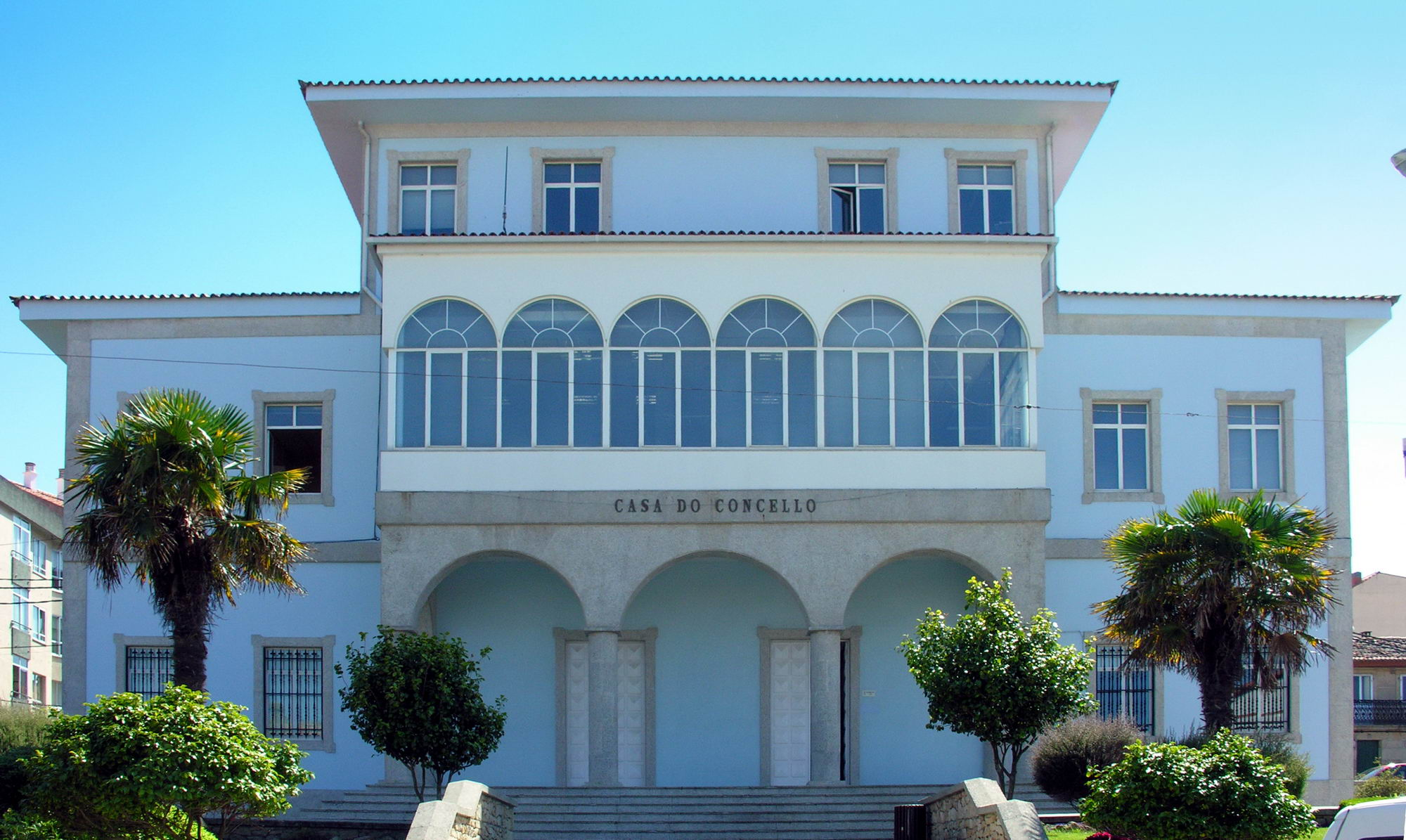

- Coat of arms
- Nickname: O Son
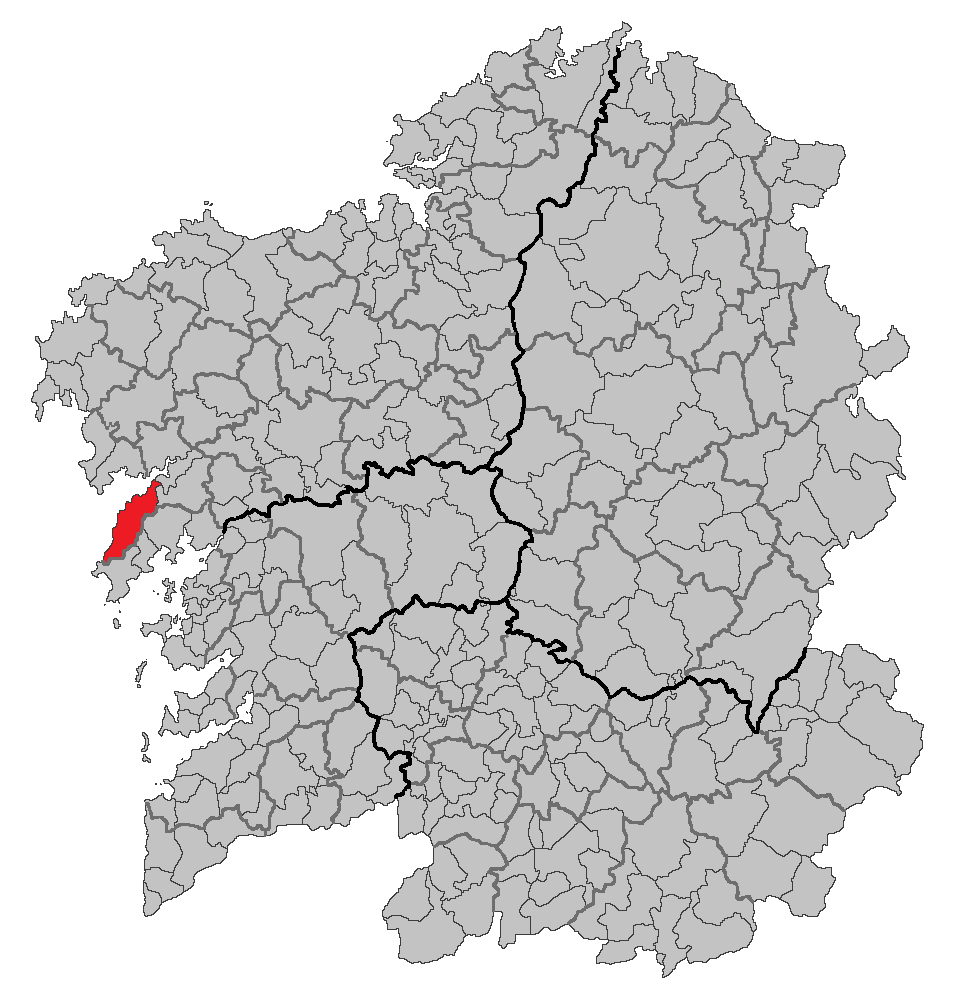
- Location of O Porto do Son within Galicia
- Coordinates: 42.7248°N 9.0052°W
- Country: Spain
- Autonomous community: Galicia
- Province: A Coruña
- Comarca: Noia

Government
  - Alcalde (Mayor): Luis Oujo Pouso (PP)

Area
  - Total: 94.58 km^{2} (36.52 sq mi)

Population (2025-01-01)
  - Total: 9,060
  - Density: 95.8/km^{2} (248/sq mi)
- Time zone: UTC+1 (CET)
  - Summer (DST): UTC+2 (CEST)
- Website: www.portodoson.gal

O Porto do Son (Galician pronunciation: [ˈpɔɾtʊ ðʊ ˈsoŋ]) is a municipality in the province of A Coruña, in the autonomous community of Galicia, Spain. It belongs to the comarca of Noia. The municipality of Porto do Son encompasses a collection of coastal towns and villages in from including the town of O Porto do Son itself, and other towns such as Portosín. The area is around 25 km by 6 km and has many beaches along with some famous Celtic ruins, the castro (i.e., "hill fort") called the "Castro de Baroña".

== Geography ==
O Porto do Son occupies the north-eastern side of the Barbanza Peninsula, and thus borders the municipalities of the Shire of Barbanza, Boiro, A Pobra do Caramiñal and Santa Uxía de Ribeira. To the north-east it borders the municipalities of Noia and Lousame. The Barbanza Peninsula is a very hilly region. Most of the population is located next to the coast. This is the largest municipality in Barbanza, and its highest point is mount Iroite.

It has an exact antipode in Hokitika, New Zealand.

== Economy ==
In 2001, the participation rate of the township was 45.2% and 9.1% unemployment. By sector, the tertiary sector is predominant, occupying 42.3% of workers. The secondary sector, with a predominant occupation of the building, employs 33% of workers. And the primary sector is the minority, occupying 24% of workers, mostly in fishing activities.

== Castro de Baroña ==
Just south of the fishing village of "Porto do Son" there are the 2000-year-old ruins of a Celtic fort at "Castro de Baroña". These ruins were only rediscovered in 1933 and are protected as a Spanish "Artistic Heritage" site. Local legend states that any person who sees the image or shape of a lion's head in the Castro de Baroña rock formations will be chosen to join the rebirth of the Celtic Clan of Baroña.

== Parishes ==
There are 10 parishes that make up the municipality:

- Baroña (San Pedro)
- Caamaño (Santa Maria)
- San Sadurniño de Goiáns
- Miñortos (San Martiño)
- Nebra (Santa Maria)
- Noal (San Vicenzo)
- Queiruga (Santo Estevo)
- Ribasieira (San Fins)
- San Pedro de Muro
- Carballosa
- Xuño (Santa Mariña)

== Places of interest ==
- Castro de Baroña
- Portosín
- Fervenza do Río Siera
- Ponte Medieval

== Gallery ==
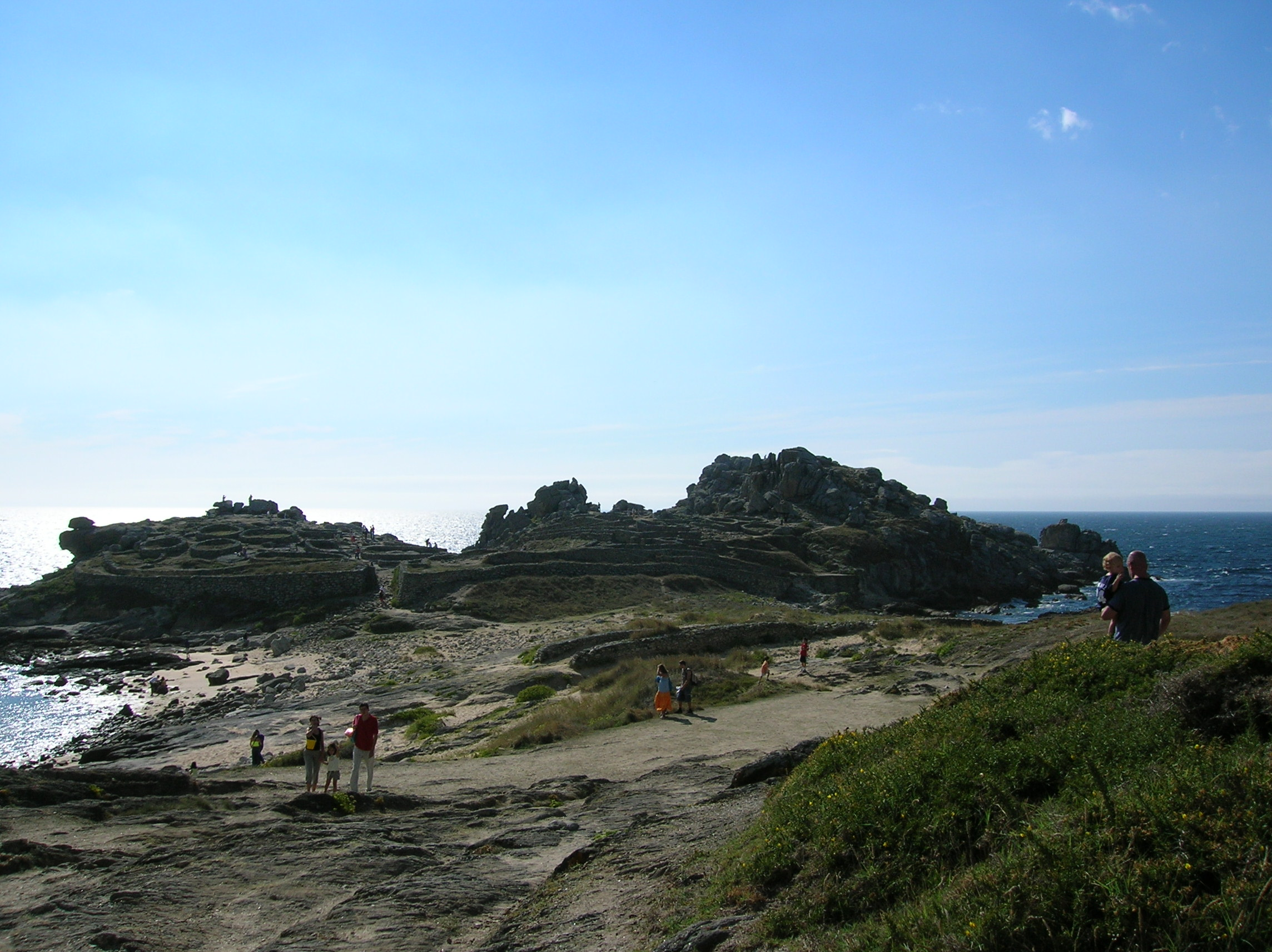
Castro de Baroña

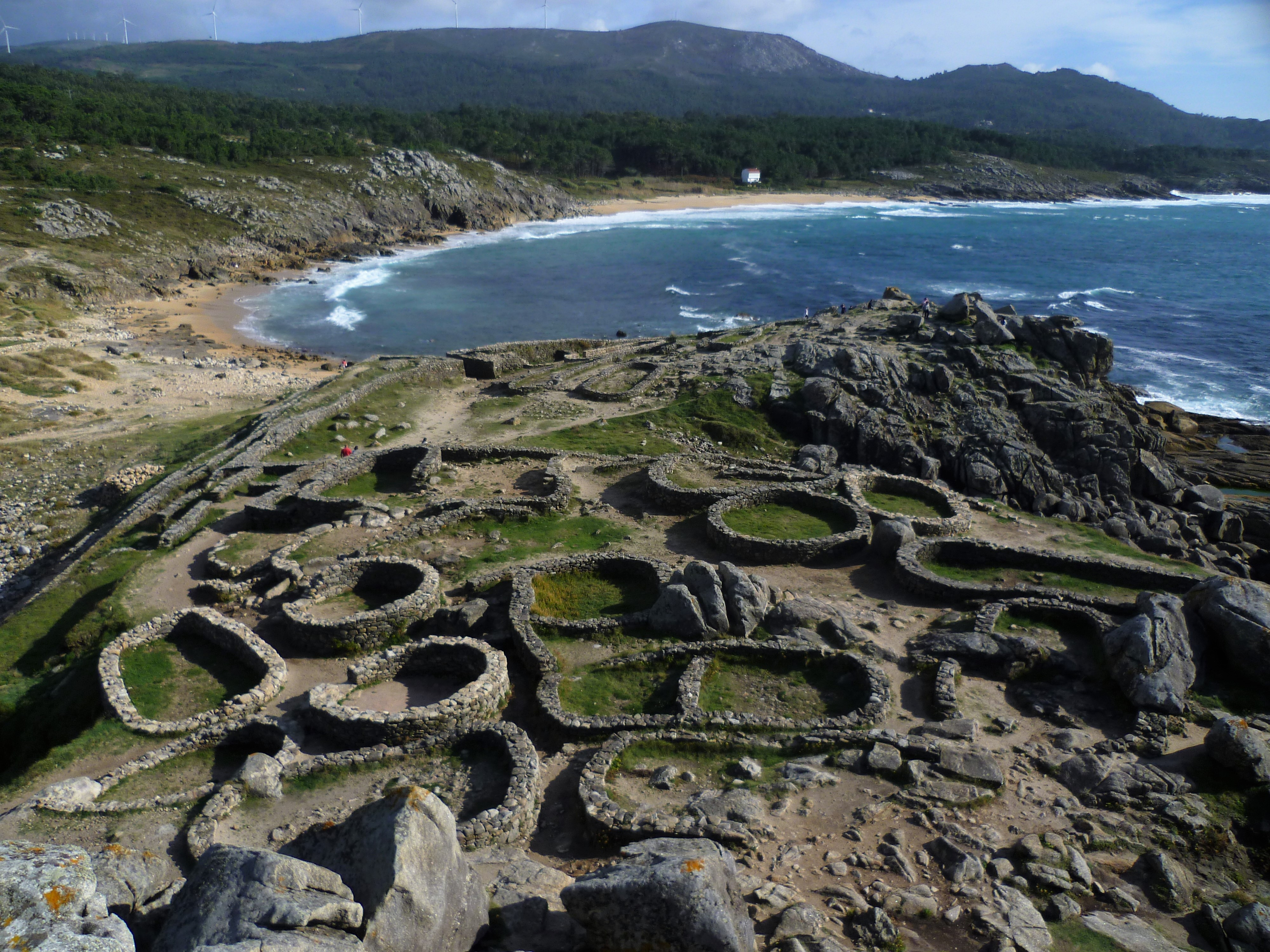
Stone village from Gaul

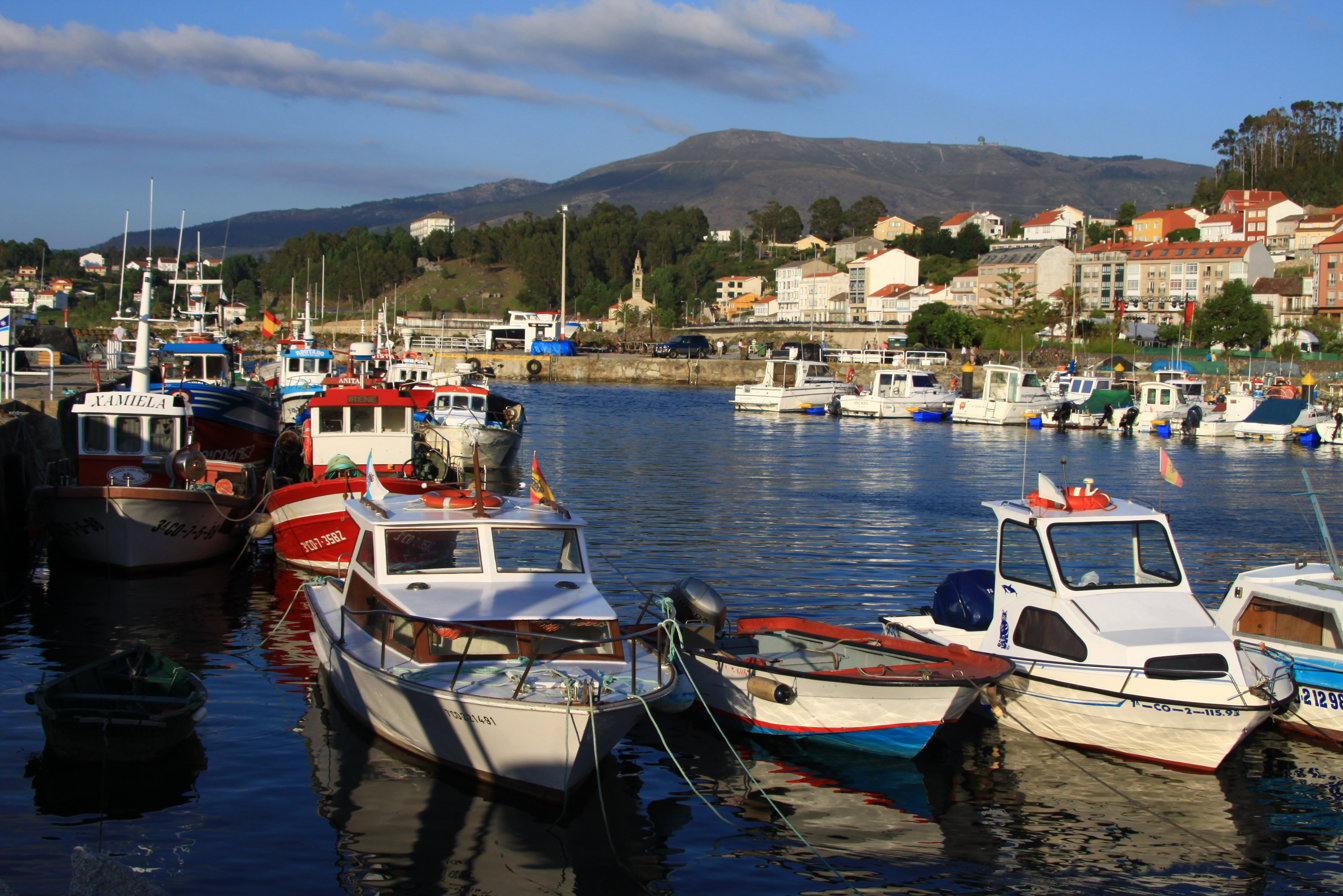

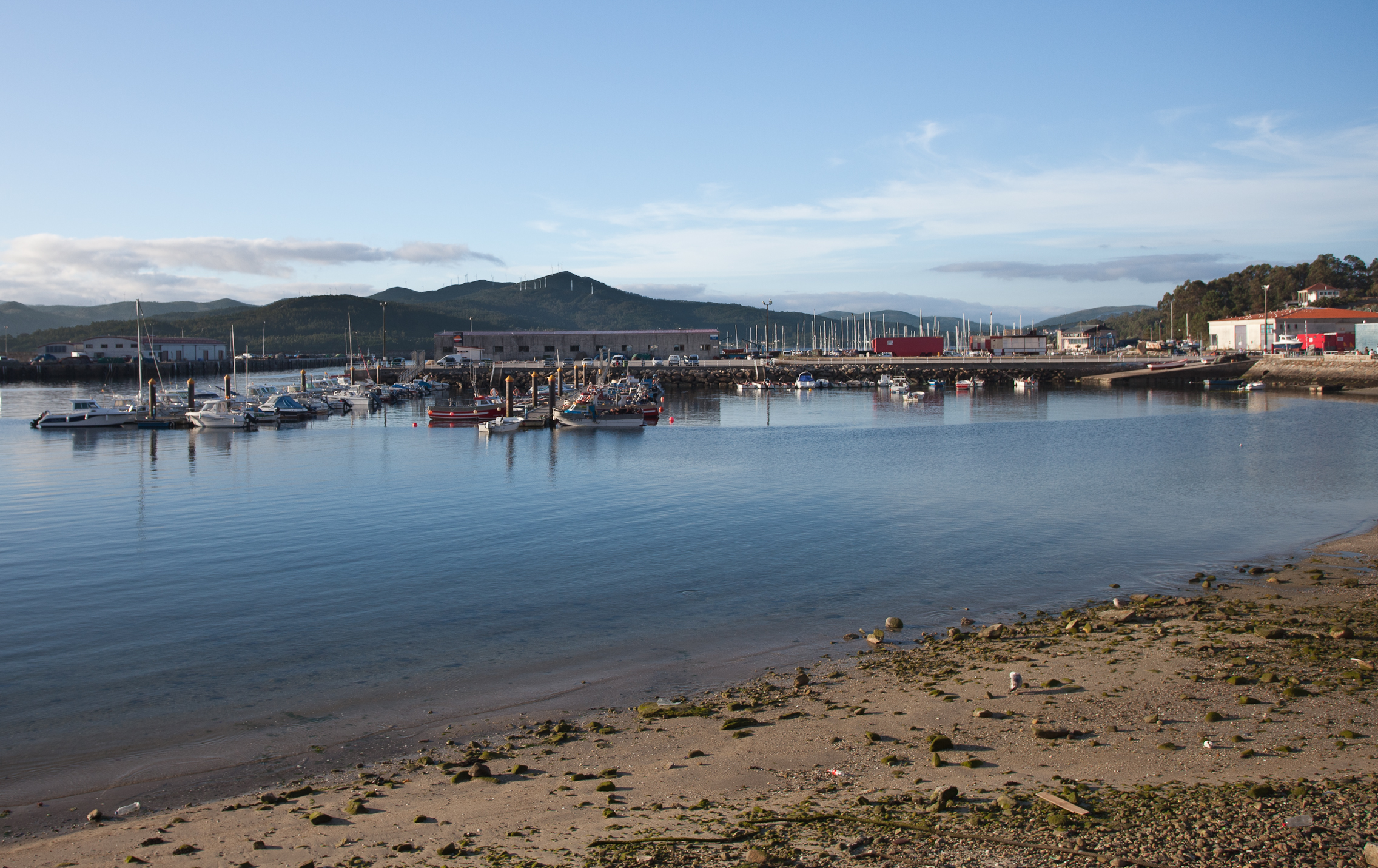

== See also ==
- List of municipalities in A Coruña
