= O Carballiño (comarca) =

Coordinates: 42°26′16″N 8°03′17″W

- Comarca
- Flag Coat of arms
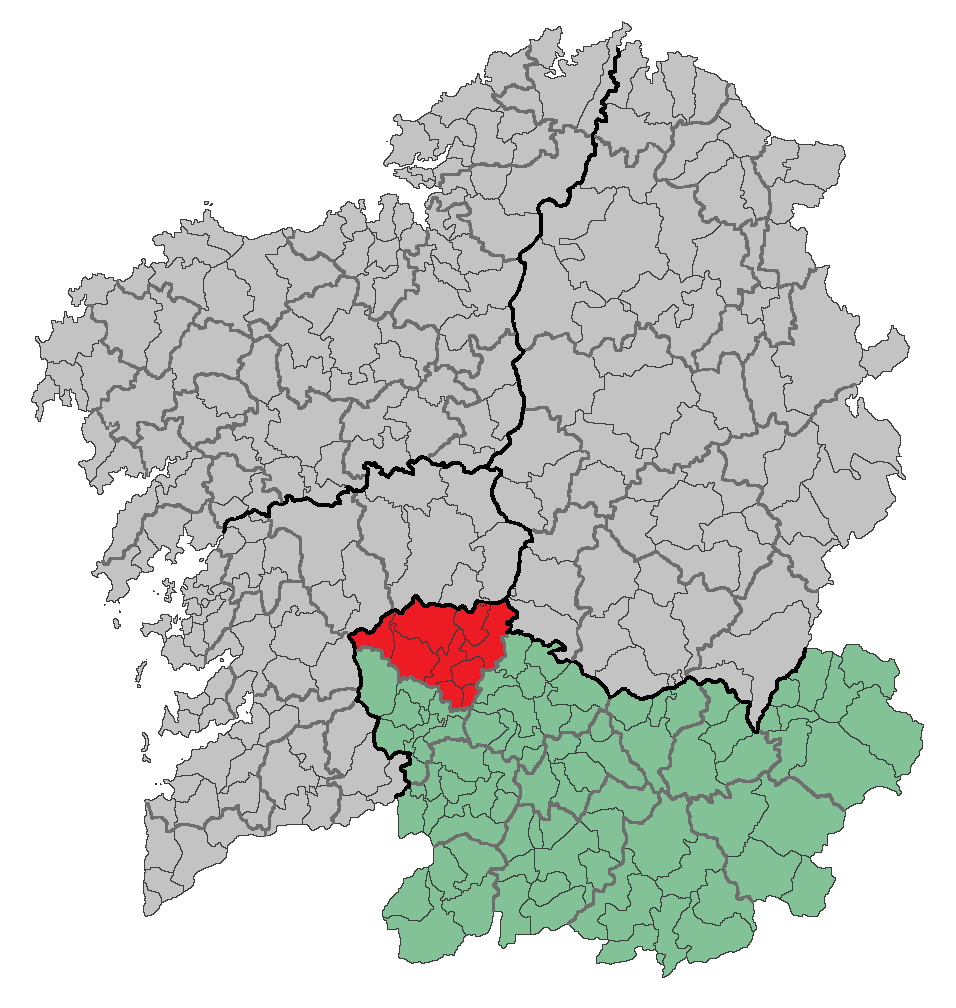
- Country: Spain
- Autonomous community: Galicia
- Province: Ourense
- Capital: O Carballiño
- Municipalities: List: San Amaro, Beariz, Boborás, O Carballiño, San Cristovo de Cea, O Irixo, Maside, Piñor, Punxín
- Demonym: carballinés
- Time zone: UTC+1 (CET)
  - Summer (DST): UTC+2 (CEST)

O Carballiño is a comarca in the Galician Province of Ourense. The overall population of this local region is 26,549 (2019).

== Municipalities ==
San Amaro, Beariz, Boborás, O Carballiño, San Cristovo de Cea, O Irixo, Maside, Piñor and Punxín.
