= Portosín =

Coordinates: 42°45′10″N 8°55′57″W

Portosin
- town
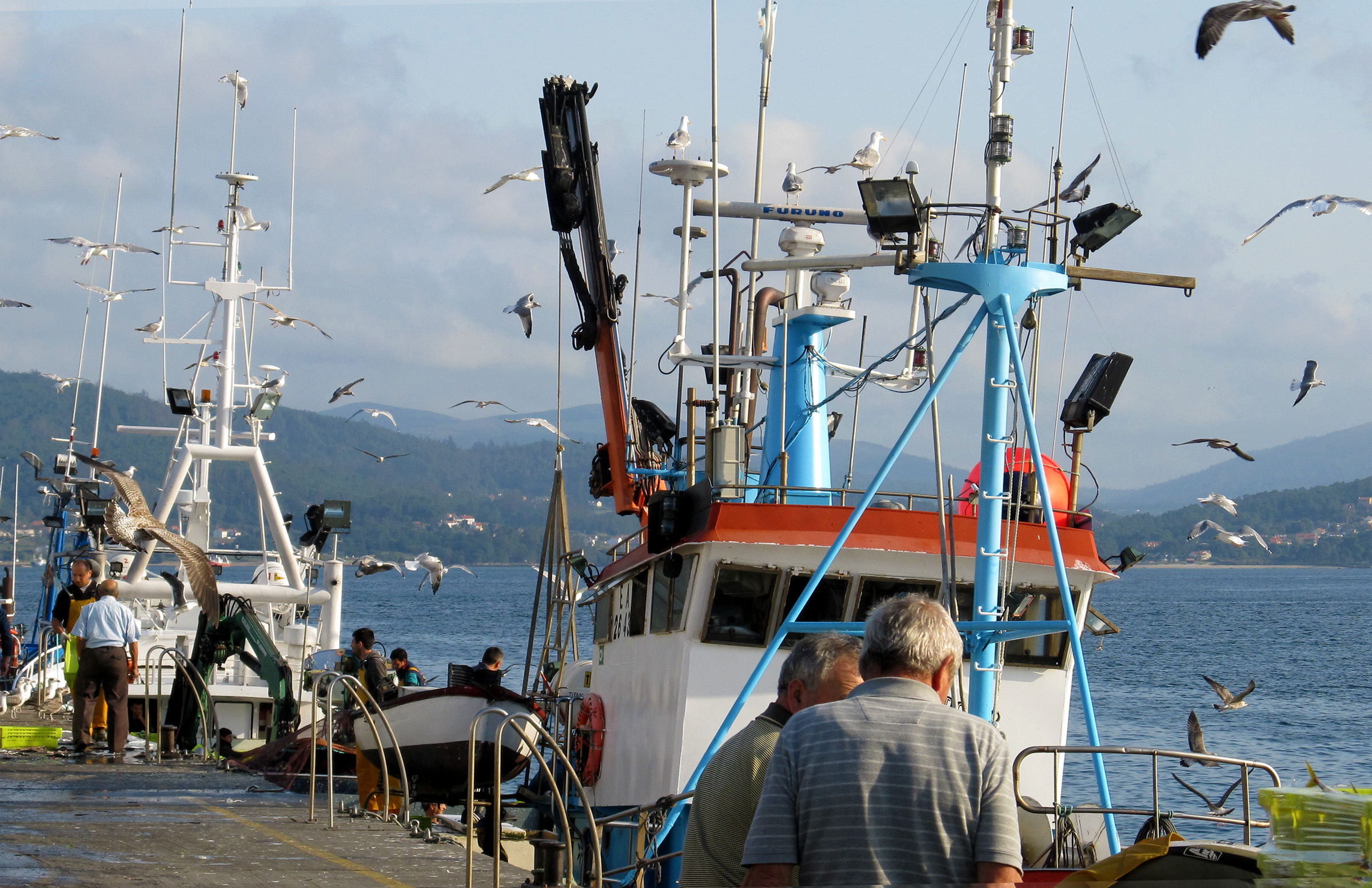
- The wharf at Portosin
- Interactive map of Portosin

Population (2018)
  - Total: 612
- Time zone: UTC+1 (CET)
  - Summer (DST): UTC+2 (CET)

Portosín is a town of northwestern Spain in the province of A Coruña, in the autonomous community of Galicia. It belongs to the comarca of Noia and municipality of Porto do Son.
