= O Irixo =

- Municipality
- Coat of arms

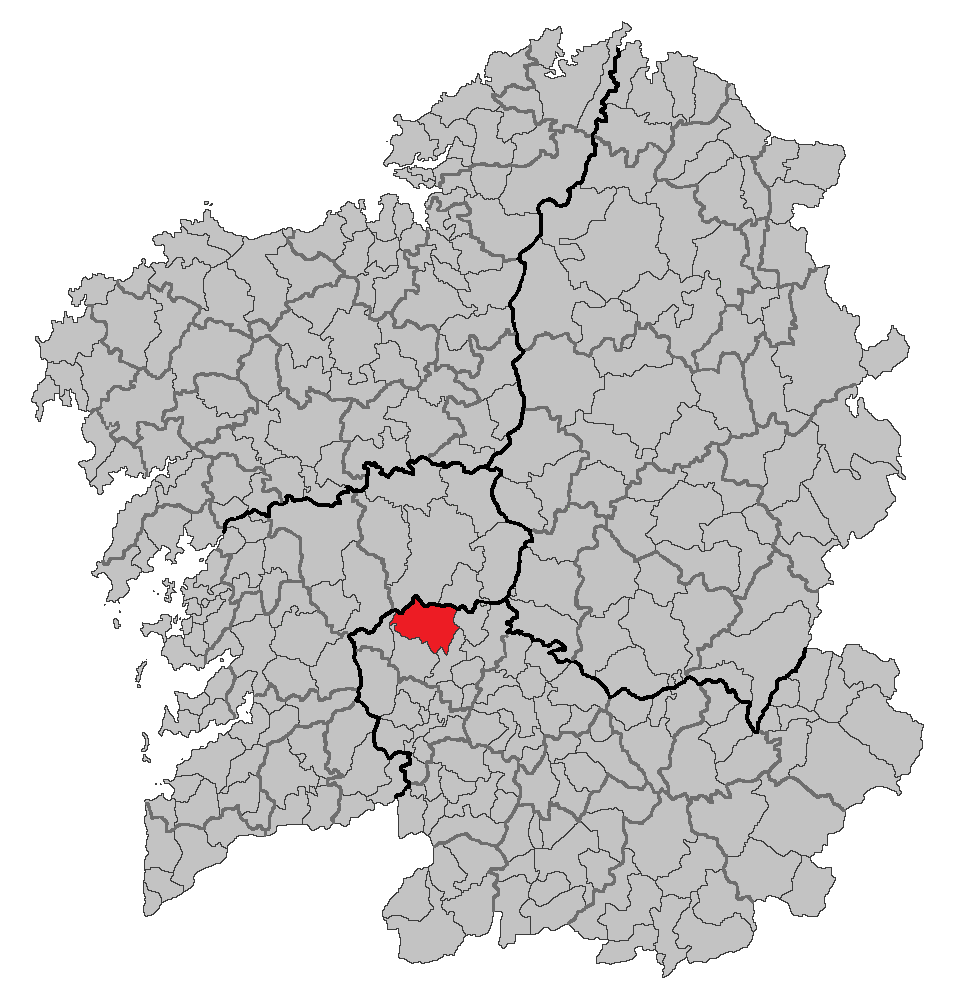
- Location in Galicia

- Location in Spain
- Coordinates: 42°30′43″N 8°07′06″W
- Country: Spain
- Autonomous community: Galicia
- Province: Ourense
- Comarca: O Carballiño

Government
  - Alcalde: Susana María Iglesias Nogueira (Xuntos polo Irixo)

Area
  - Total: 121.0 km^{2} (46.7 sq mi)
- Elevation: 546 m (1,791 ft)

Population (2025-01-01)
  - Total: 1,340
  - Density: 11.1/km^{2} (28.7/sq mi)
- Time zone: UTC+1 (CET)
  - Summer (DST): UTC+2 (CEST)

O Irixo is a municipality in the northwest province of Ourense, in the autonomous community of Galicia, Spain. It belongs to the comarca of O Carballiño.
