= Castro de Elviña =

Castro of Elviña
- Castro de Elviña (Galician)
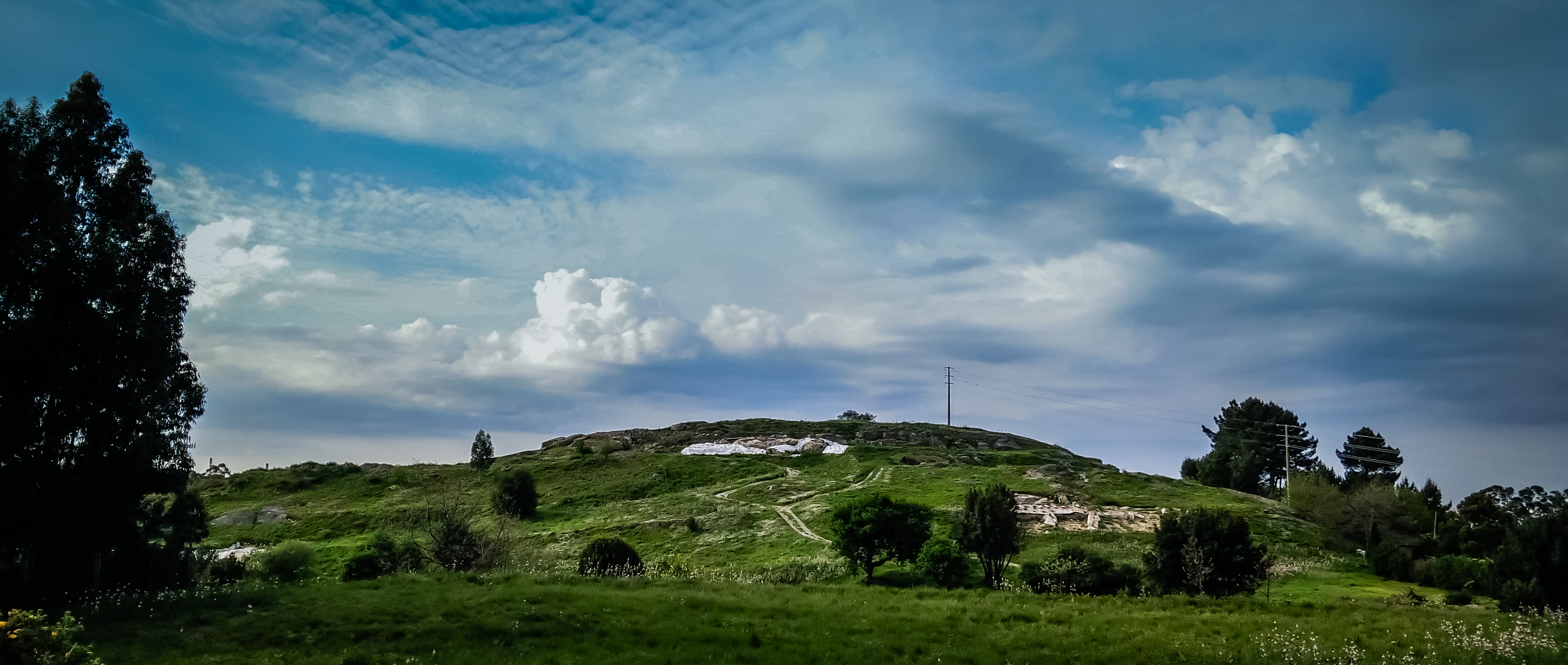
- The hill fort in 2015

- Location within Spain
- 43.329444°N 8.415278°W

Spanish Cultural Heritage
- Official name: Castro de Elviña
- Type: Non-movable
- Criteria: Monument
- Designated: 1962

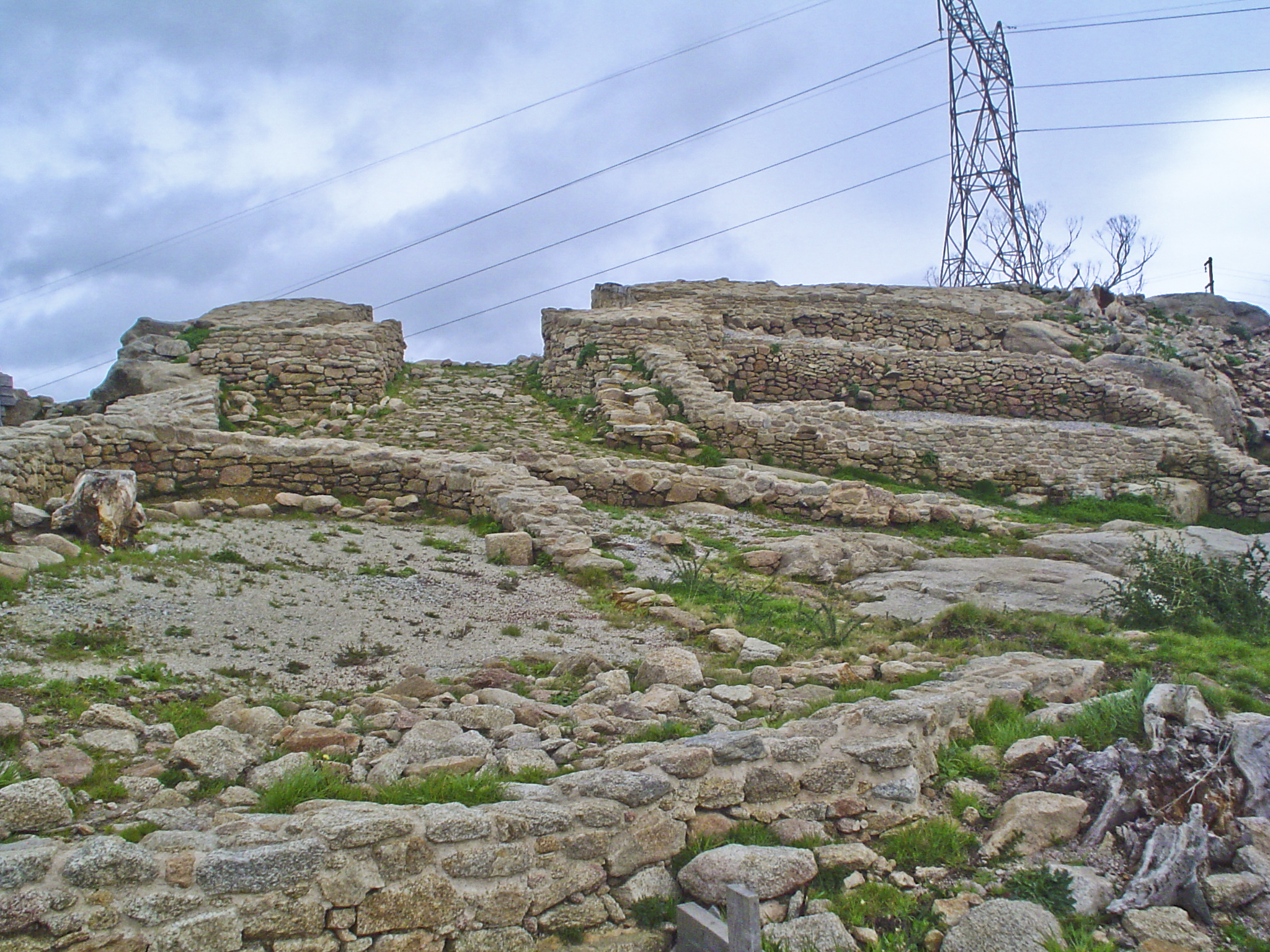
Ruins.

Castro of Elviña ([ˈkastɾo ðe elˈβiɲa]) is an Iron Age hill fort located south of the city of A Coruña, Galicia, Spain. It was declared a historic monument in 1962.

== See also ==
- Castro culture
- Gallaeci
- List of castros in Galicia
