= San Cristovo de Cea =

- Municipality
- Coat of arms

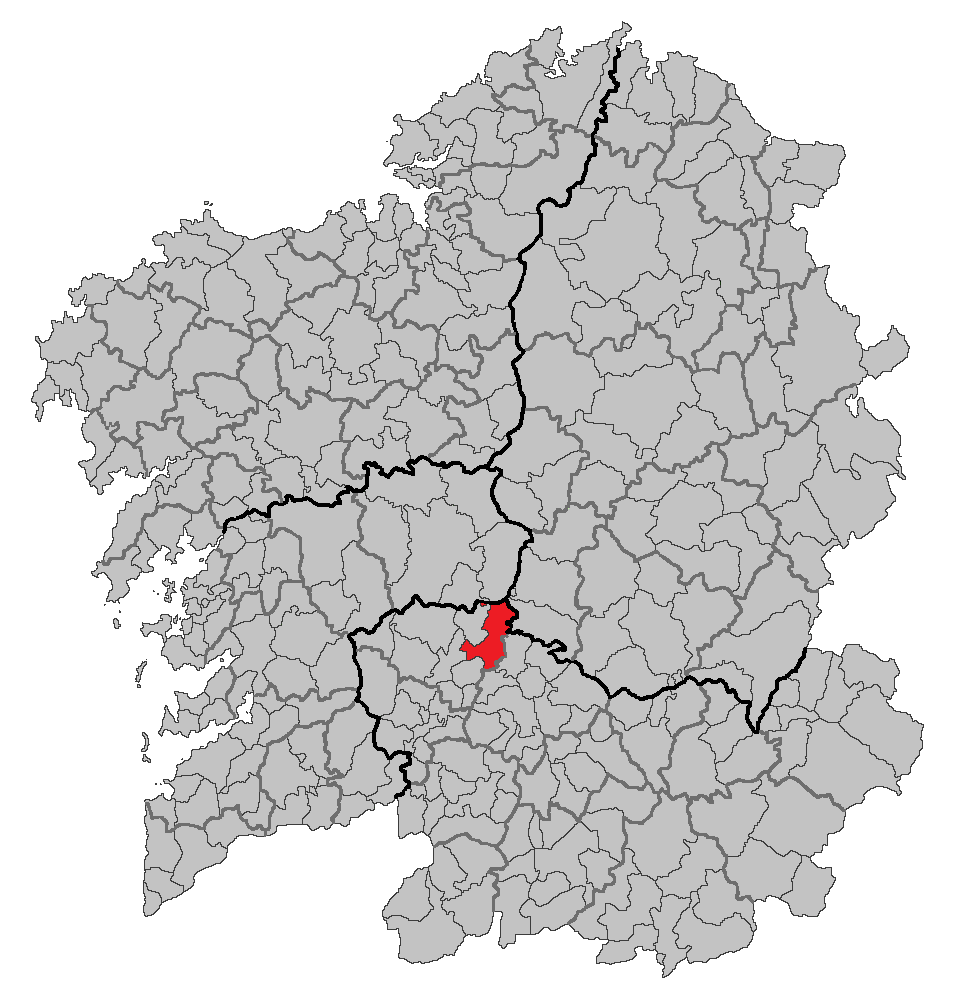
- Location in Galicia

- Location of San Cristovo de Cea in Ourense Location of San Cristovo de Cea in Galicia Location of San Cristovo de Cea in Spain
- Coordinates: 42°28′21″N 7°58′55″W
- Country: Spain
- Autonomous community: Galicia
- Province: Ourense
- Comarca: O Carballiño

Government
  - Mayor: José Luis Valladares Fernández (PPdeG)

Area
  - Total: 94.4 km^{2} (36.4 sq mi)
- Elevation: 526 m (1,726 ft)

Population (2025-01-01)
  - Total: 1,963
  - Density: 20.8/km^{2} (53.9/sq mi)
- Time zone: UTC+1 (CET)
  - Summer (DST): UTC+2 (CEST)
- Website: www.concellodecea.com

San Cristovo de Cea (in spanish 'San Cristóbal de Cea) is a municipality in the province of Orense, in the autonomous community of Galicia, Spain. It belongs to the comarca of O Carballiño.
