= Castro of San Cibrao de Las =

Archeological site in Galicia, Spain

Coordinates: 42.3601°N 8.0300°W

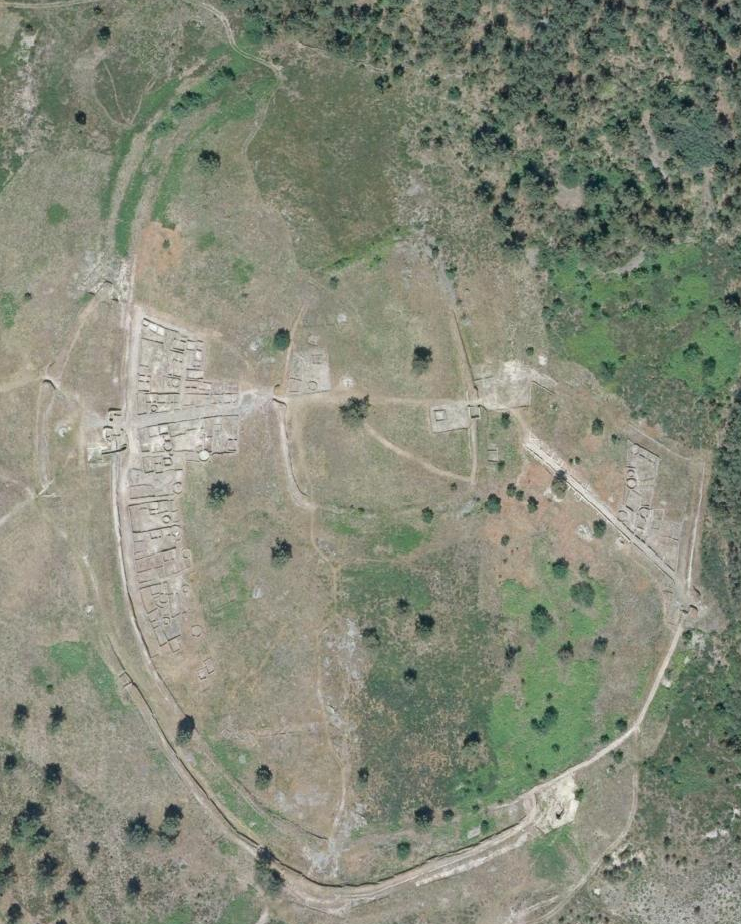

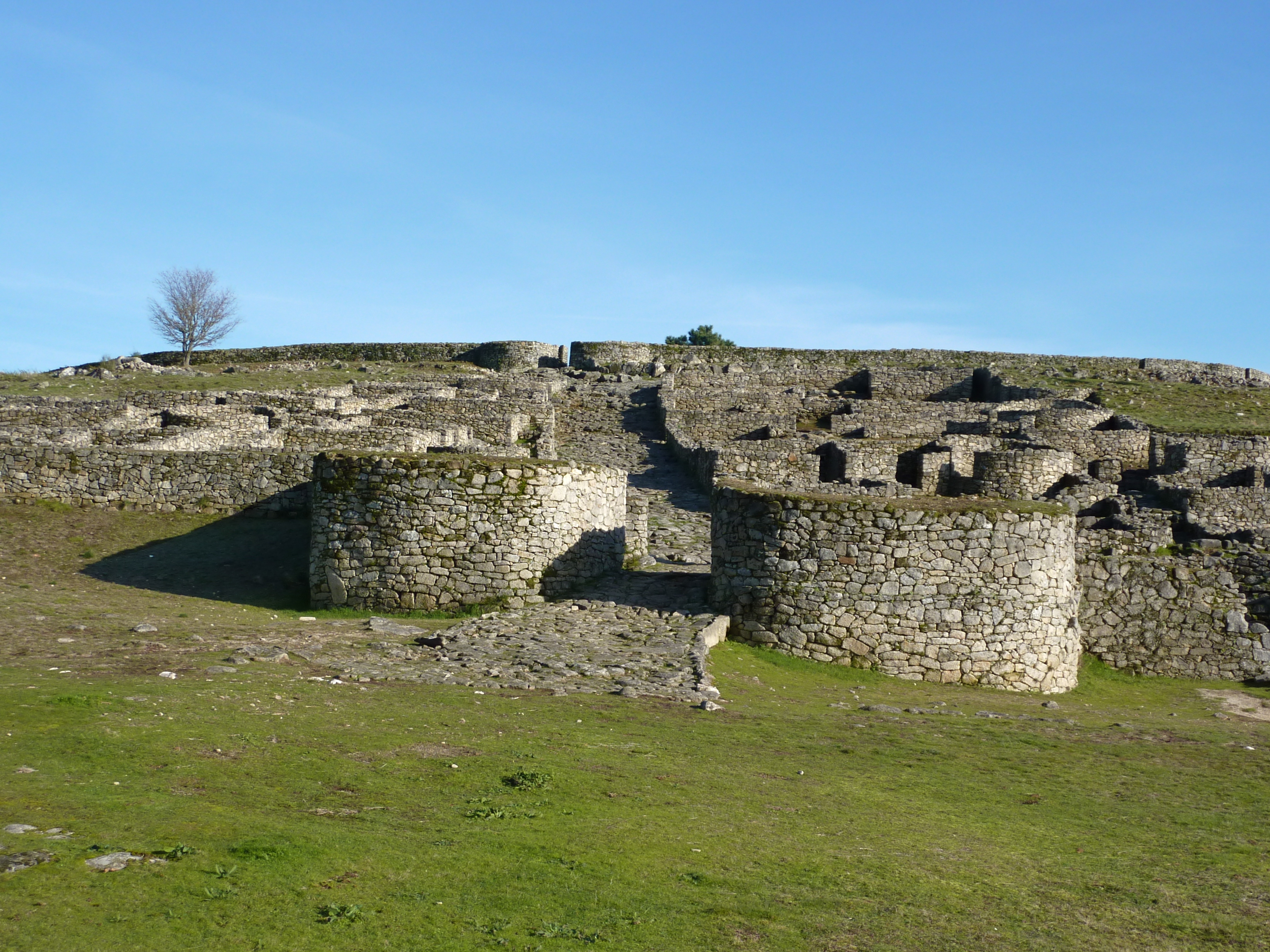
Monumental gate of the oppidum of San Cibrao de Lás

San Cibrao de Las hill fort (Castro de San Cibrao de Las) is an archeological site in Galicia, Spain. It is a hill fort of the so-called castro culture. Rather than a single castle, it encompasses an entire fortified town or village.

The place was inhabited from the second century BC to the second century AD. It flourished during the first century, at the beginning of Roman rule in Galicia.

The ruins are located on a 473-metre-high hill, covering an area 384 m long and 314 m wide. Unlike the other hill forts of the area, there are many straight walls and fewer curving structures.
