= Castro de A Cidá =

Coordinates: 42.561386°N 9.013628°W

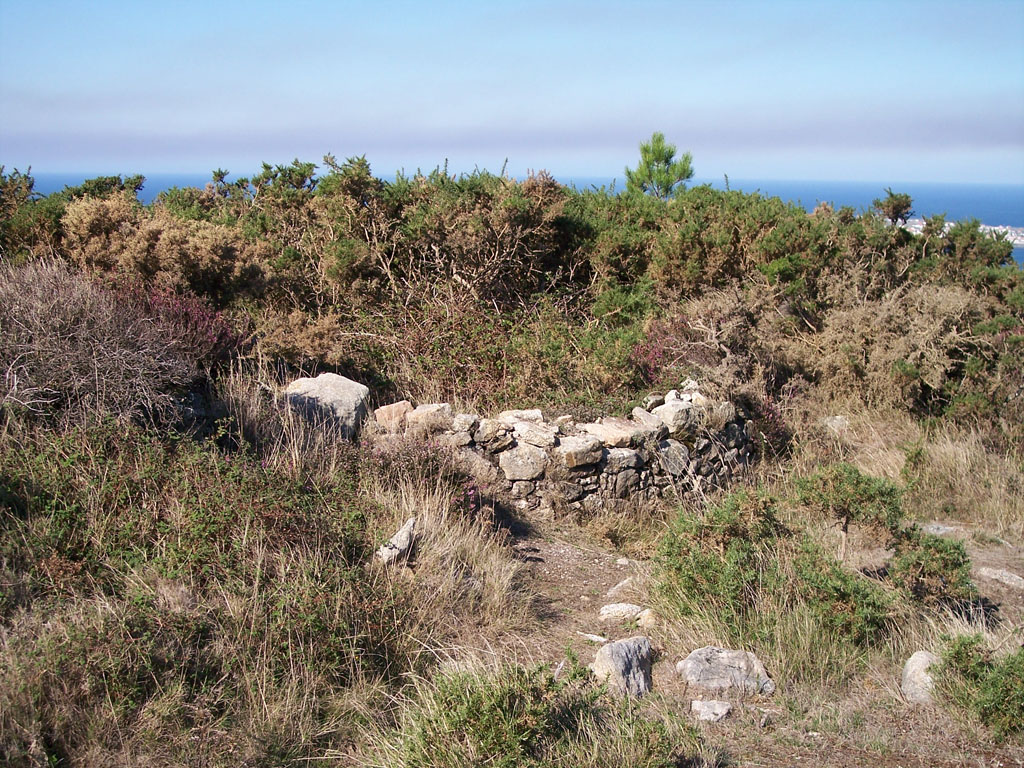

Castro de A Cidá is a ruined site in Province of A Coruña, Galicia, Spain.
