= Rois, Spain =

Municipality in Galicia, Spain

Coordinates: 42.750°N 8.683°W

Concello de Rois
- Municipality
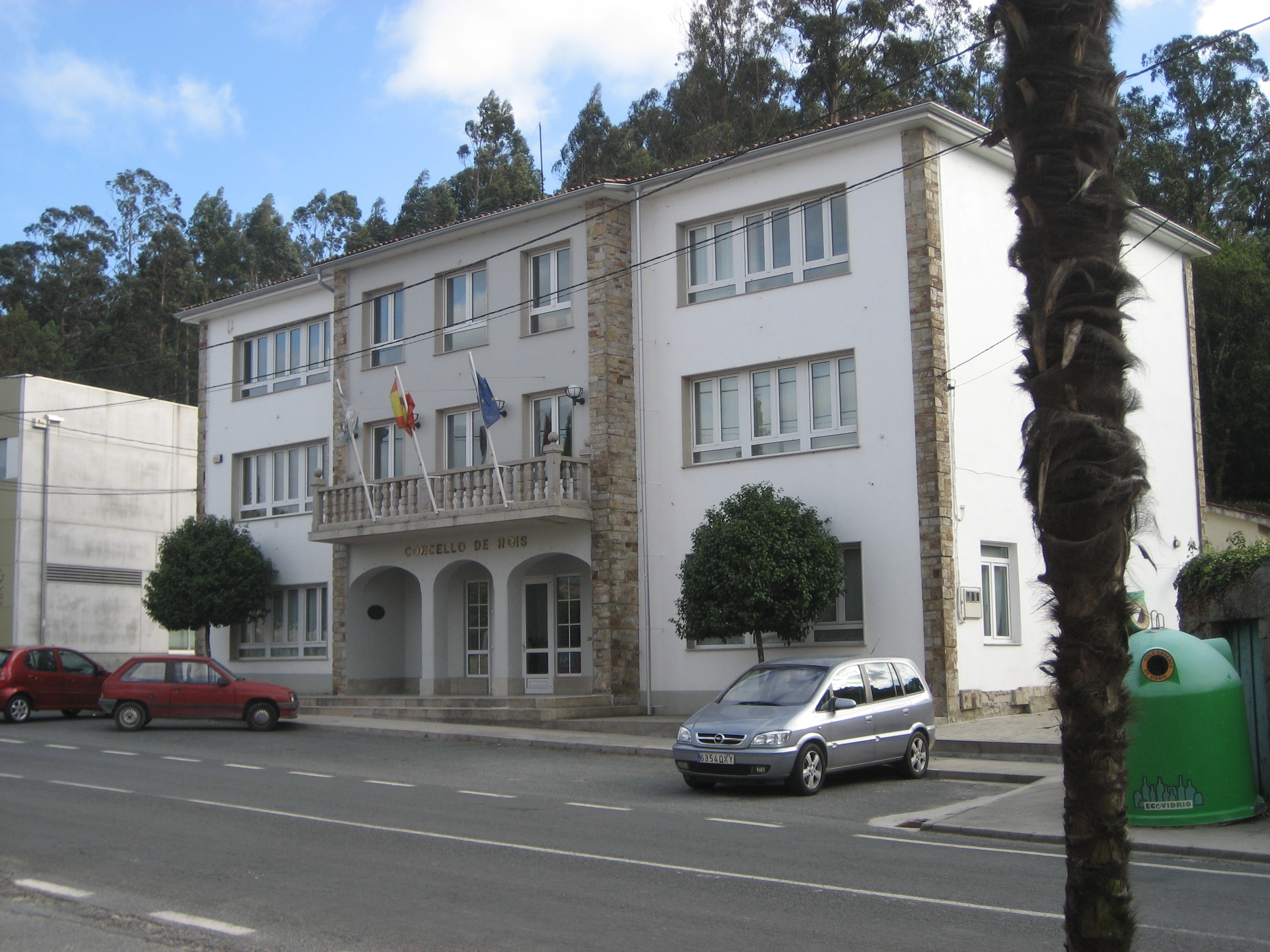

- Coat of arms
- Nickname: Rois
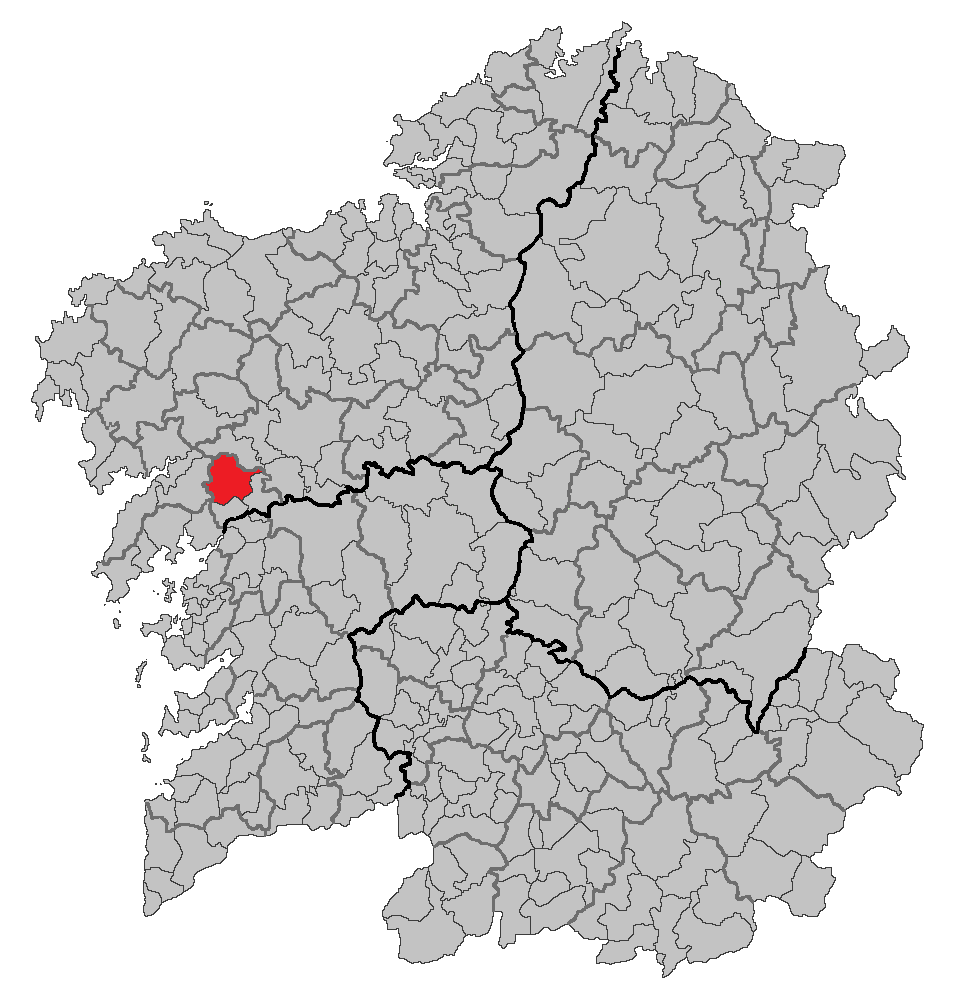
- Location of Rois within Galicia

Government
  - Alcalde (Mayor): Ramón Tojo Lens (PP)

Area
  - Total: 93 km^{2} (36 sq mi)

Population (2025-01-01)
  - Total: 4,358
  - Density: 47/km^{2} (120/sq mi)
- Time zone: UTC+1 (CET)
  - Summer (DST): UTC+2 (CEST)

Rois is a municipality of northwestern Spain in the province of A Coruña in the autonomous community of Galicia. It belongs to the comarca of Sar and it is located in the Southwest of the province of A Coruña.

== See also ==
List of municipalities in A Coruña
