= Castro de Achadizo =

Archaeological site in Galicia, Spain

Coordinates: 42°36′59″N 8°53′04″W

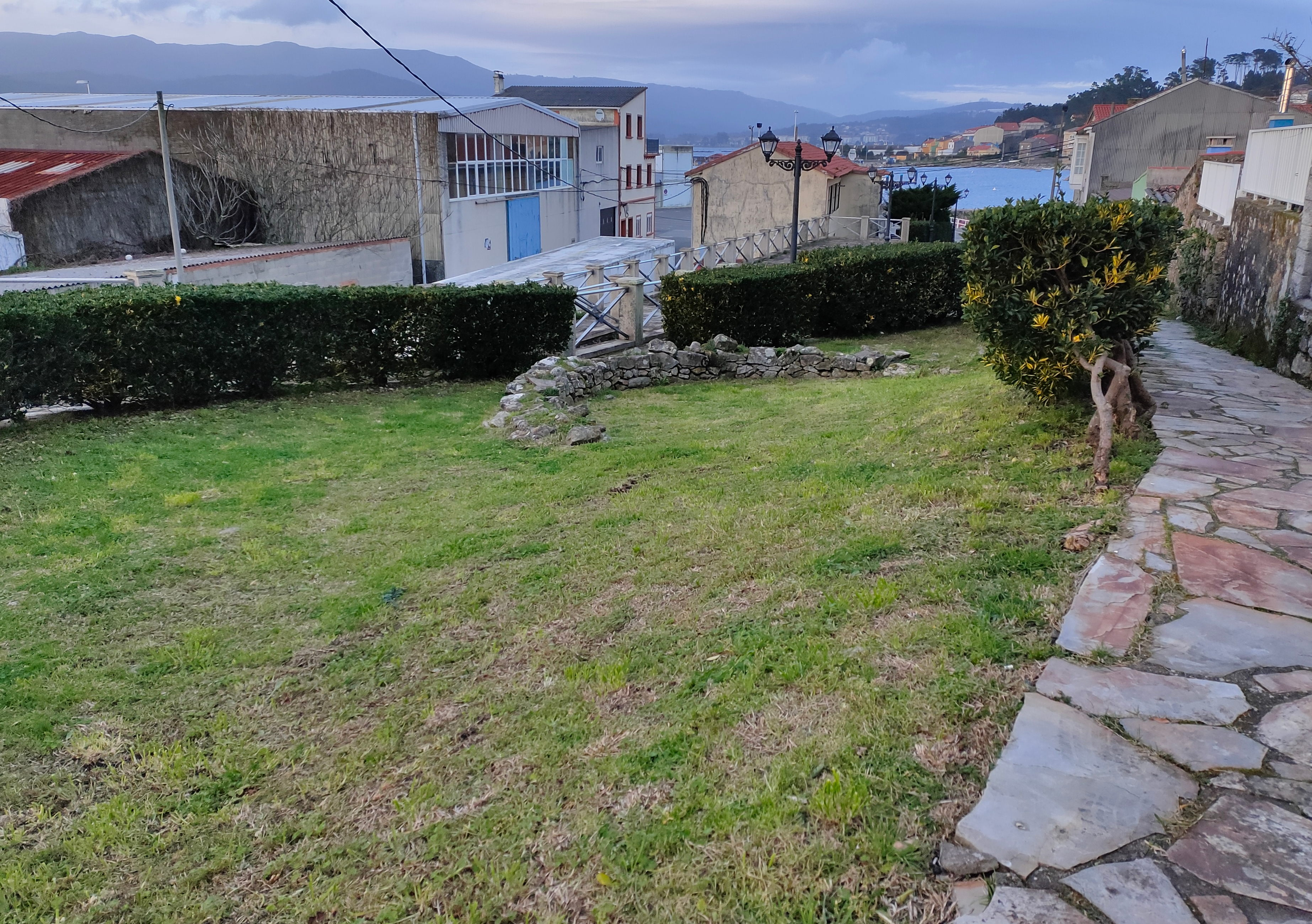

Castro de Achadizo is an Iron Age fort hill (castro) located in Province of A Coruña, Galicia, Spain. It was inhabited mainly between the 6th and 2nd centuries BC.

Its morphology is typical of the so-called coastal castros. Its appearance is greatly disfigured by the neighborhood built on a large part of the archaeological area. The excavations carried out in it unearthed several residential structures and remains of the stone wall, as well as several landfills. These remains were consolidated, signposted and integrated into a public recreation area.
