= Castriño de Conxo =

Ruined site in Galicia, Spain

Coordinates: 42°51′56″N 8°34′02″W

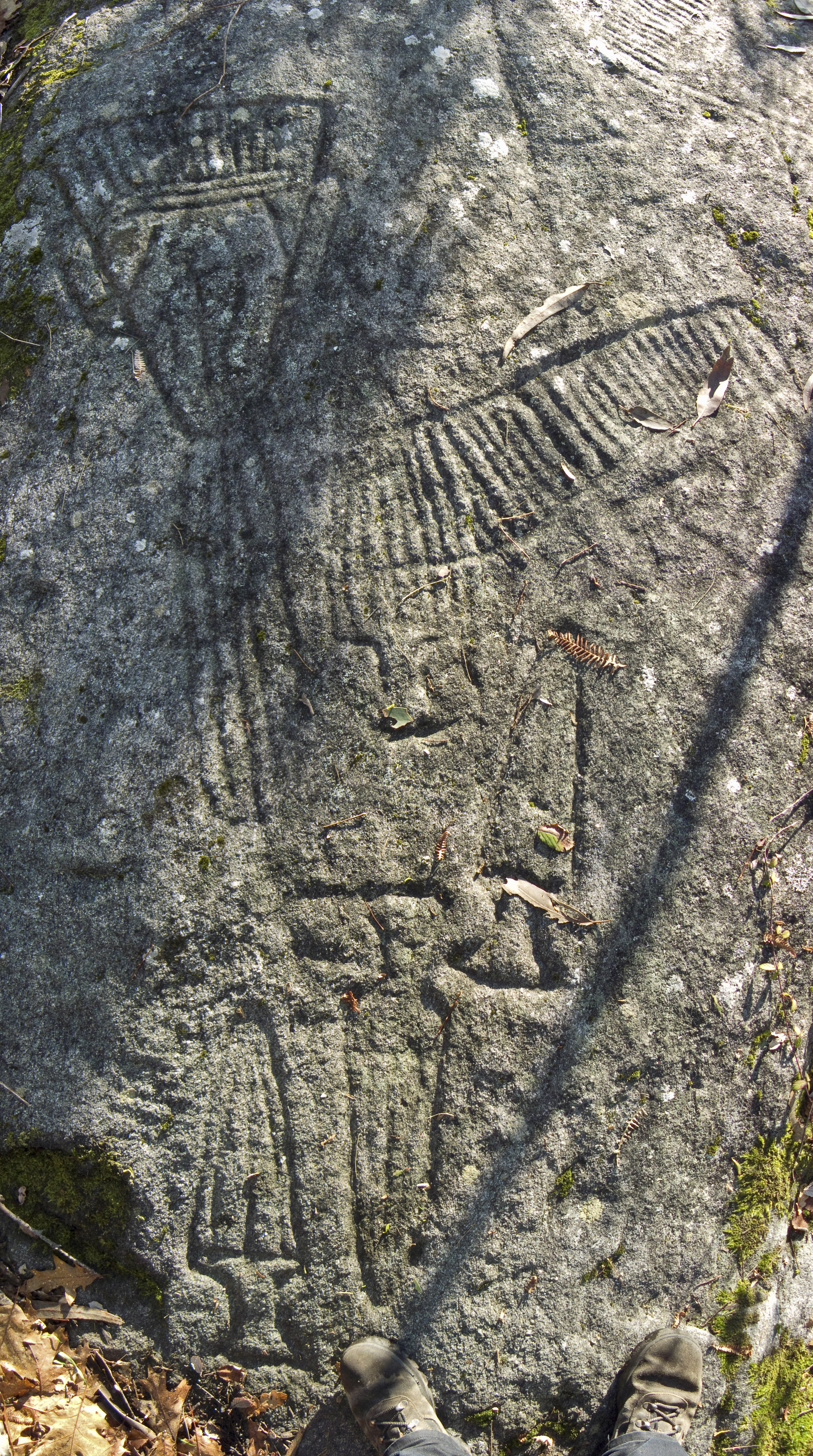
One of the petroglyphs

Castriño de Conxo is an archaeological site located in the municipality of Santiago de Compostela, Galicia, Spain. It consists of an Iron Age fort hill (castro) and a series of petroglyphs.

Nowadays is in a complete state of abandonment, so it's not easy to visit, since it is covered with vegetation and trees. The area is divided by a fence, leaving a large part of the site in private property. In May 2019 it suffered an act of vandalism when an unidentified person scratched it, marking the grooves of the petroglyph with a stone.
