= Beariz =

- Municipality
- Coat of arms

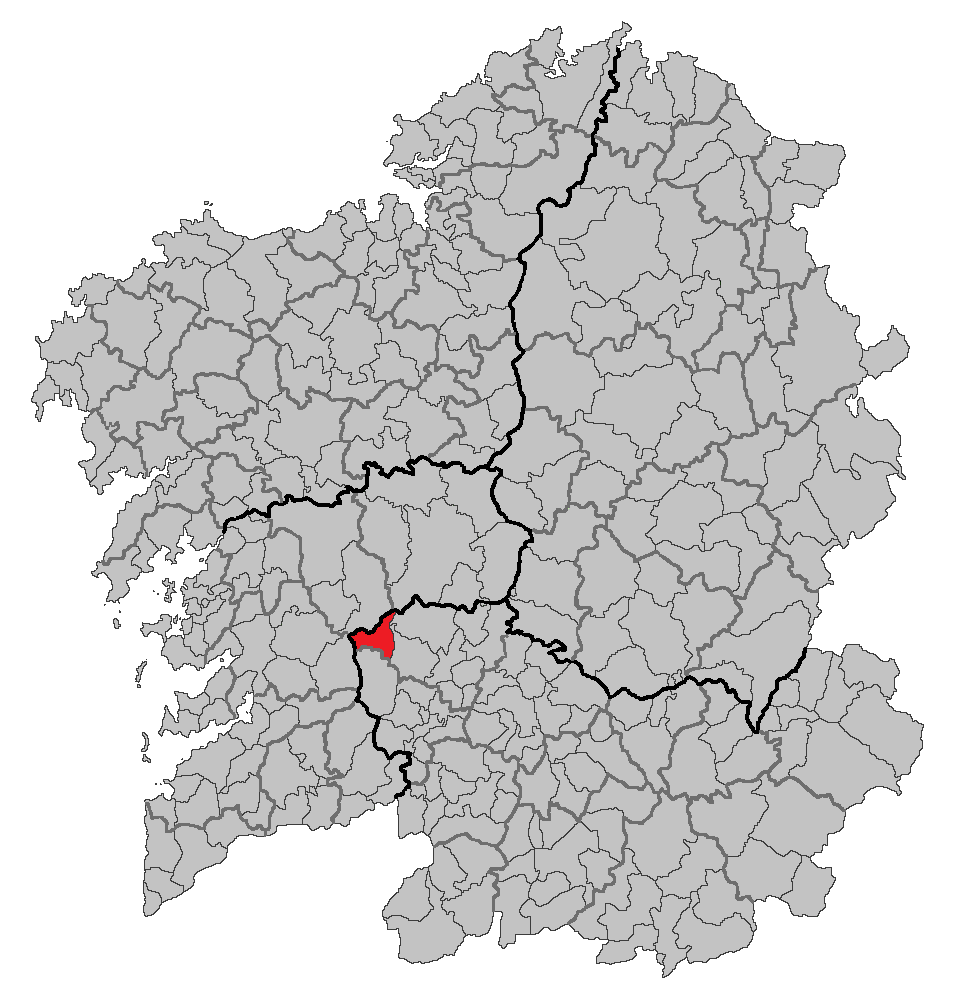
- Location in Galicia

- Location in Spain
- Coordinates: 42°27′58″N 8°16′14″W
- Country: Spain
- Autonomous community: Galicia
- Province: Ourense
- Comarca: O Carballiño

Government
  - Mayor: Manuel Prado López (PPdeG)

Area
  - Total: 56.2 km^{2} (21.7 sq mi)
- Elevation: 613 m (2,011 ft)

Population (2025-01-01)
  - Total: 901
  - Density: 16.0/km^{2} (41.5/sq mi)
- Time zone: UTC+1 (CET)
  - Summer (DST): UTC+2 (CEST)
- INE municipality code: 32011
- Website: www.beariz.org

Beariz is a municipality in the province of Ourense, in the autonomous community of Galicia, Spain. It belongs to the comarca of O Carballiño. As of 2016, it had a population of 1,003.
