= Boborás =

- Municipality
- Coat of arms

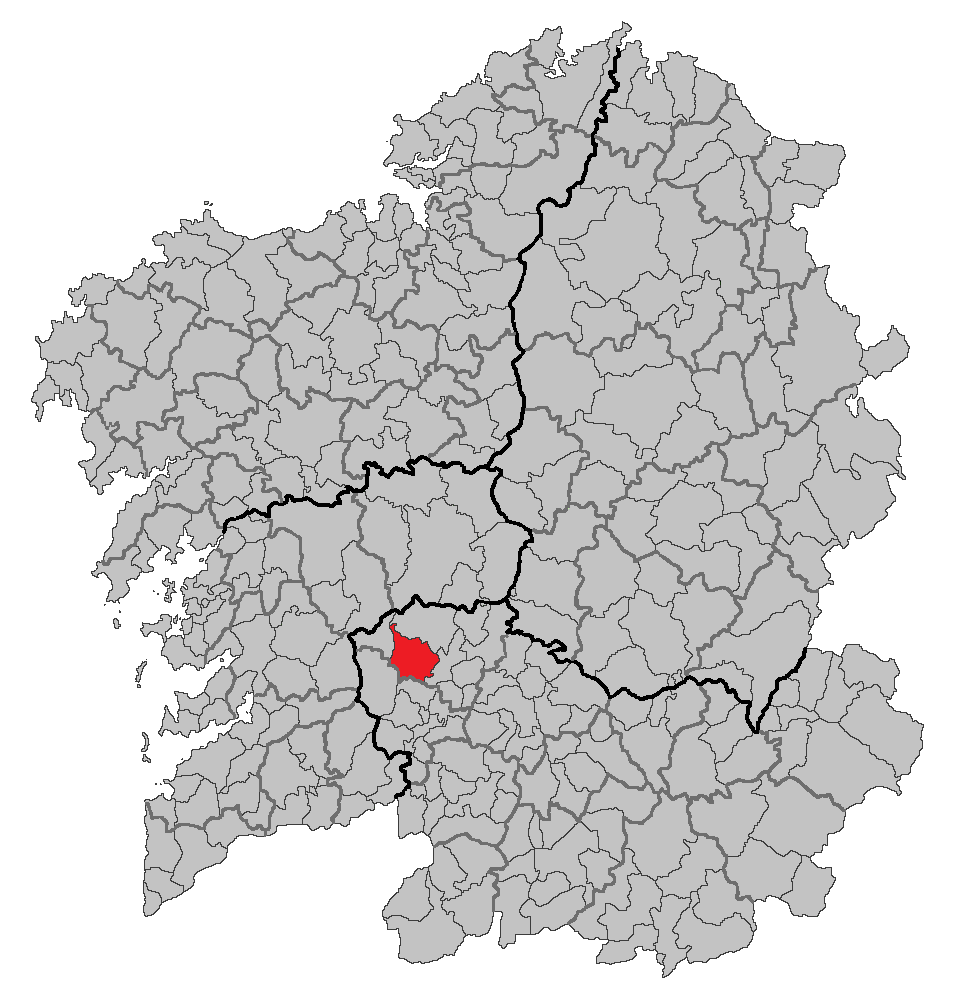
- Location in Galicia

- Location in Spain
- Coordinates: 42°26′N 8°09′W
- Country: Spain
- Autonomous community: Galicia
- Province: Ourense
- Comarca: O Carballiño

Government
  - Mayor: Ana Patricia Torres Madureira (PPdeG)

Area
  - Total: 87.8 km^{2} (33.9 sq mi)
- Elevation: 424 m (1,391 ft)

Population (2025-01-01)
  - Total: 2,167
  - Density: 24.7/km^{2} (63.9/sq mi)
- Time zone: UTC+1 (CET)
  - Summer (DST): UTC+2 (CEST)
- INE municipality code: 32013
- Website: Official website

Boborás is a municipality in the province of Ourense, in the autonomous community of Galicia, Spain. It belongs to the comarca of O Carballiño.
