= Castro de Porto de Baixo =

Coordinates: 42.540331°N 9.033867°W

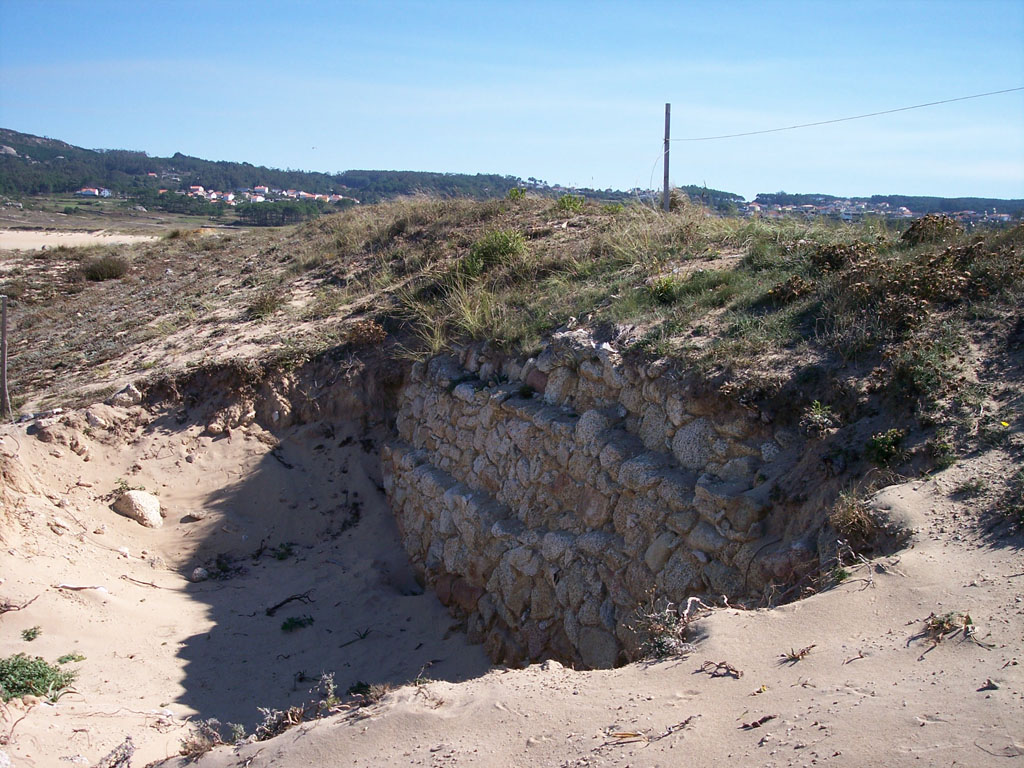
Section of the defensive wall

Castro of Porto de Baixo is an archeological site located within the Dunes of Corrubedo Natural Park in Galicia, Spain. It was inhabited between the 4th century BC and 2nd century BC.
