= Lousame =

Coordinates: 42°47′N 8°52′W

Concello de Lousame
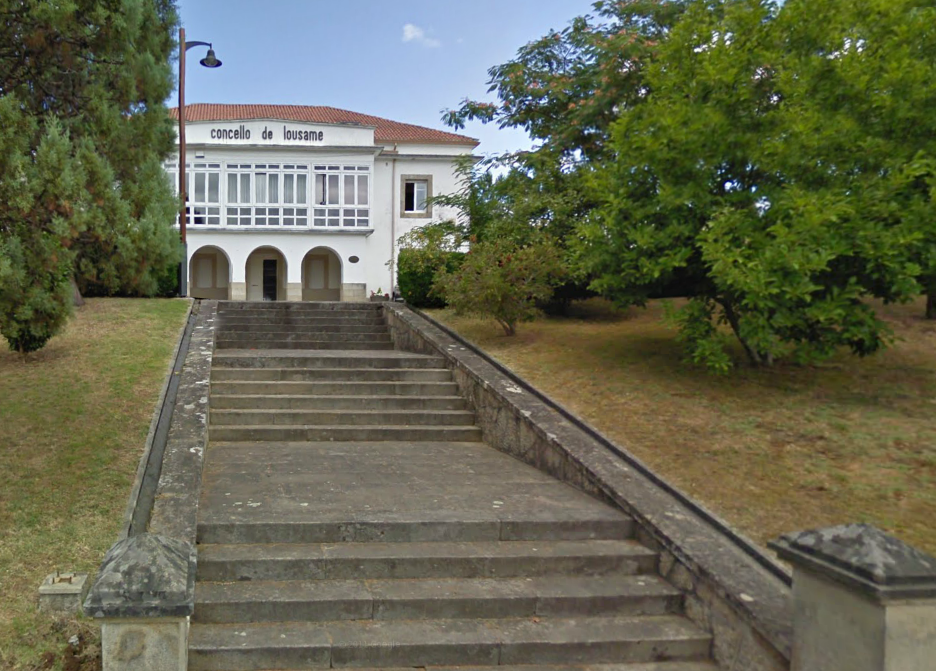

- Coat of arms
- Nickname: Lousame
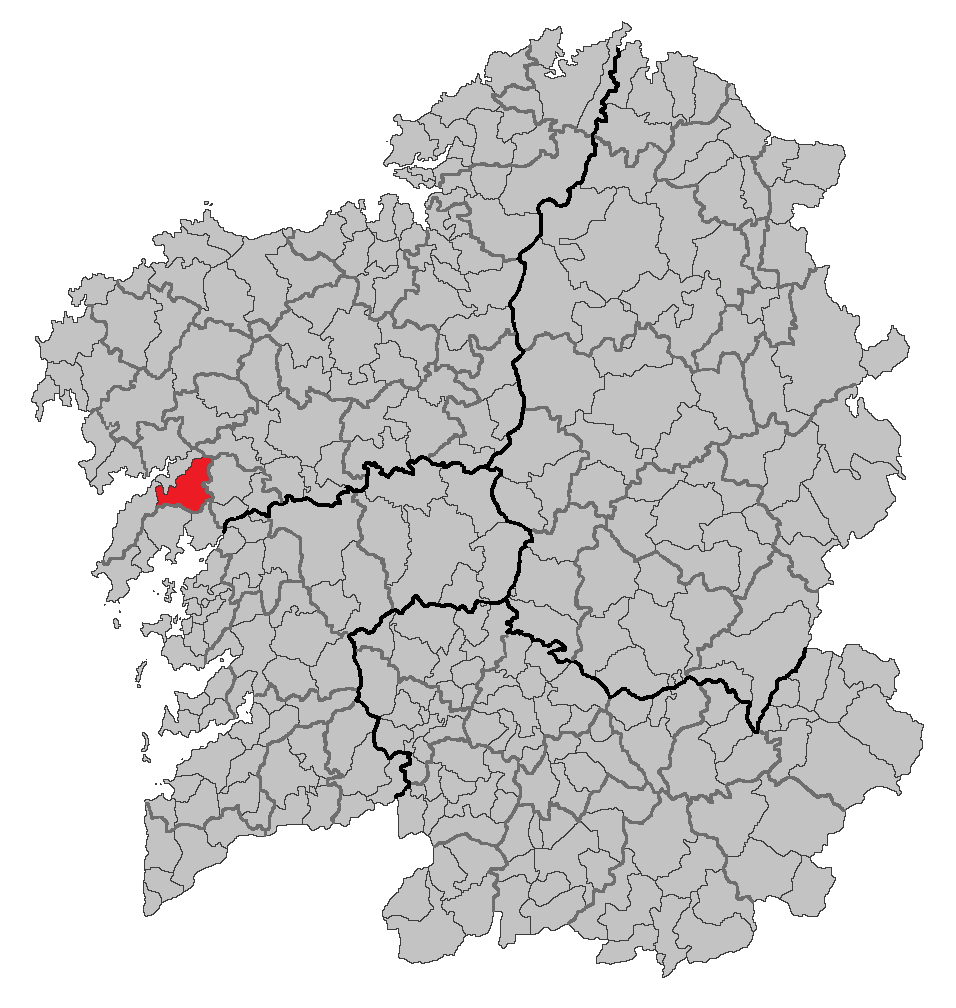
- Location of Lousame within Galicia

Government
  - Alcalde (Mayor): Santiago Freire Abeijón (PP)

Area
  - Total: 94.24 km^{2} (36.39 sq mi)

Population (2025-01-01)
  - Total: 3,056
  - Density: 32.43/km^{2} (83.99/sq mi)
- Time zone: UTC+1 (CET)
  - Summer (DST): UTC+2 (CEST)

Lousame is a municipality of northwestern Spain in the province of A Coruña, in the autonomous community of Galicia. It belongs to the comarca of Noia. It has a population of 3,657 inhabitants (INE, 2011).

== See also ==
List of municipalities in A Coruña
