= San Amaro =

- Municipality
- Coat of arms

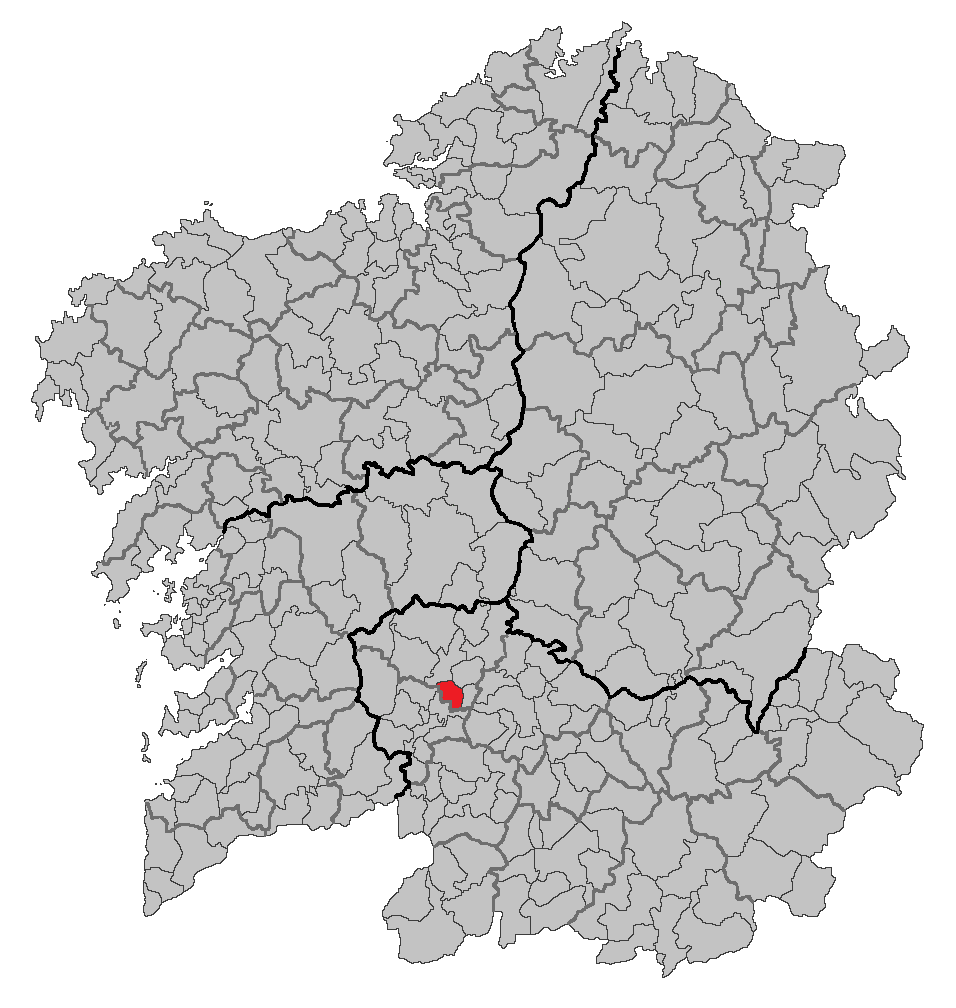
- Location in Galicia

- Location in Spain
- Coordinates: 42°22′23″N 8°04′23″W
- Country: Spain
- Autonomous community: Galicia
- Province: Ourense
- Comarca: O Carballiño

Government
  - Mayor: Ernesto Pérez González (PPdeG)

Area
  - Total: 28.9 km^{2} (11.2 sq mi)
- Elevation: 476 m (1,562 ft)

Population (2025-01-01)
  - Total: 1,030
  - Density: 35.6/km^{2} (92.3/sq mi)
- Time zone: UTC+1 (CET)
  - Summer (DST): UTC+2 (CEST)
- Website: www.sanamaro.es/

San Amaro is a municipality in the province of Ourense, in the autonomous community of Galicia, Spain. It belongs to the comarca of O Carballiño. Its name is a homage to Saint Amaro.
