= Soutelo =

Soutelo may refer to the following places:

== In Galicia ==
- Soutelo, a civil parish in the municipality of Salceda de Caselas;
- Soutelo, a hamlet in the civil parish of Bueu, in the municipality of Bueu;
- Soutelo, a hamlet in the civil parish of Valeixe, in the municipality of Cañiza;
- Soutelo, a hamlet in the civil parish of Oleiros, in the municipality of Carballedo;
- Soutelo, a hamlet in the civil parish of Anfeoz, in the municipality of Cartelle;
- Soutelo, a hamlet in the civil parish of San Paio de Abeleda, in the municipality of Castro Caldelas;
- Soutelo, a hamlet in the civil parish of Rabiño, in the municipality of Cortegada;
- Soutelo, a hamlet in the civil parish of Piñeiro, in the municipality of Cuntis;
- Soutelo, a hamlet in the civil parish of Santa Olaia de Esgos, in the municipality of Esgos;
- Soutelo, a hamlet in the civil parish of Lourenzá, in the municipality of Lourenzá;
- Soutelo, a hamlet in the civil parish of Camboño, in the municipality of Lousame;
- Soutelo, a hamlet in the civil parish of San Martiño de Manzaneda, in the municipality of Manzaneda;
- Soutelo, a hamlet in the civil parish of Proente, in the municipality of Merca;
- Soutelo, a hamlet in the civil parish of Olas, in the municipality of Mesía;
- Soutelo, a hamlet in the civil parish of Farnadeiros, in the municipality of Muíños;
- Soutelo, a hamlet in the civil parish of Cudeiro, in the municipality of Ourense;
- Soutelo, a hamlet in the civil parish of Celeiros, in the municipality of Ponteareas;
- Soutelo, a hamlet in the civil parish of Sobreganade, in the municipality of Porqueira;
- Soutelo, a hamlet in the civil parish of San Xurxo de Piquín, in the municipality of Ribeira de Piquín;
- Soutelo, a hamlet in the civil parish of Ferreiravella, in the municipality of Riotorto;
- Soutelo, a hamlet in the civil parish of Herbogo, in the municipality of Rois;
- Soutelo, a hamlet in the civil parish of Lumeares, in the municipality of Teixeira;
- Soutelo, a hamlet in the civil parish of Goián, in the municipality of Tomiño;
- Soutelo, a hamlet in the civil parish of Trasmiras, in the municipality of Trasmiras;
- Soutelo, a hamlet in the civil parish of Rubiáns, in the municipality of Vilagarcía de Arousa;
- Soutelo, a hamlet in the civil parish of Sabuguido, in the municipality of Vilariño de Conso;
- O Soutelo, a hamlet in the civil parish of Triabá, in the municipality of Castro de Rei;
- Soutelo da Pena, a hamlet in the civil parish of Pena, in the municipality of Xinzo de Limia;
- Soutelo de Abaixo, a hamlet in the civil parish of Saiar, in the municipality of Caldas de Reis;
- Soutelo de Arriba, a hamlet in the civil parish of Saiar, in the municipality of Caldas de Reis;
- Soutelo de Montes, a hamlet in the civil parish of Madanela de Montes, in the municipality of Forcarei;
- Soutelo de Ribeira, a hamlet in the civil parish of Cima de Ribeira, in the municipality of Xinzo de Limia;
- Soutelo Verde, a hamlet in the civil parish of Castro de Laza, in the municipality of Laza;
- A Fonte Soutelo, a hamlet in the civil parish of Remesar, in the municipality of Estrada.

== In Portugal ==
- Soutelo (Chaves), a civil parish in the municipality of Chaves
- Soutelo (Mogadouro), a civil parish in the municipality of Mogadouro
- Soutelo (Vieira do Minho), a civil parish in the municipality of Vieira do Minho
- Soutelo (Vila Verde), a civil parish in the municipality of Vila Verde
- Soutelo de Aguiar, a civil parish in the municipality of Vila Pouca de Aguiar
- Soutelo do Douro, a civil parish in the municipality of São João da Pesqueira
- Soutelo Mourisco, a civil parish in the municipality of Macedo de Cavaleiros
