= Allariz =

Coordinates: 42°11′N 7°48′W

- Town and municipality
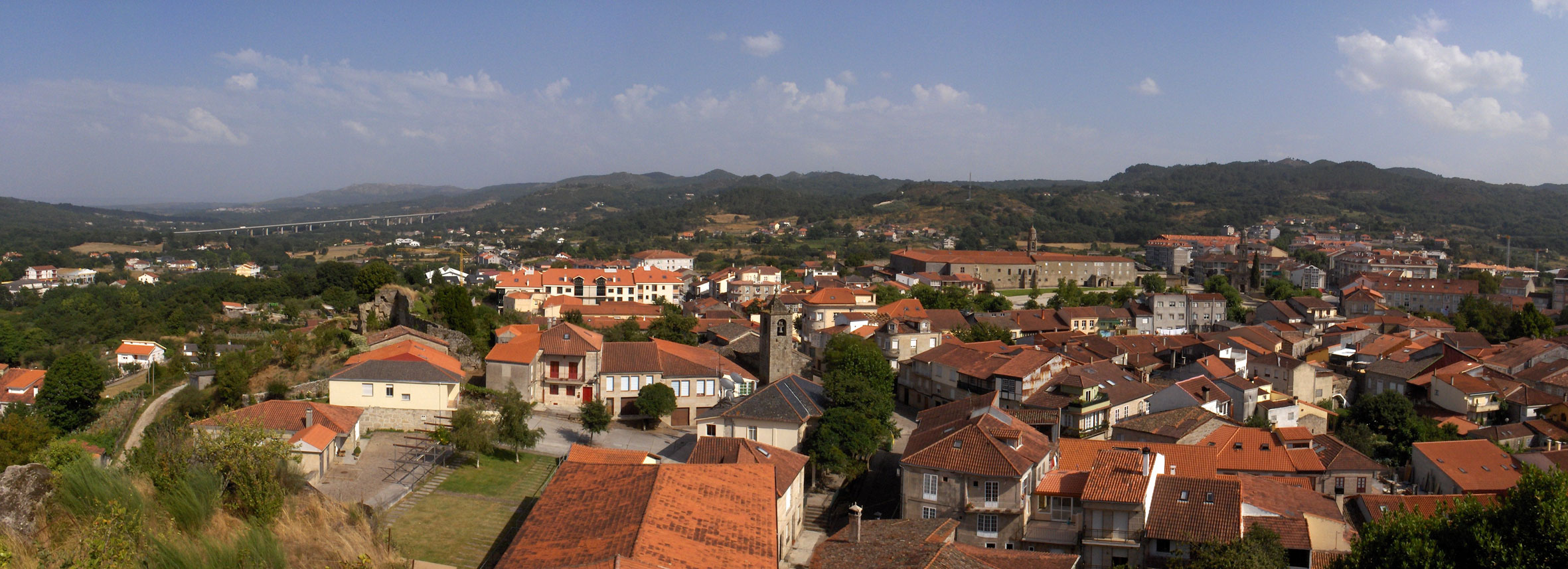
- Panorama of the town

- Coat of arms

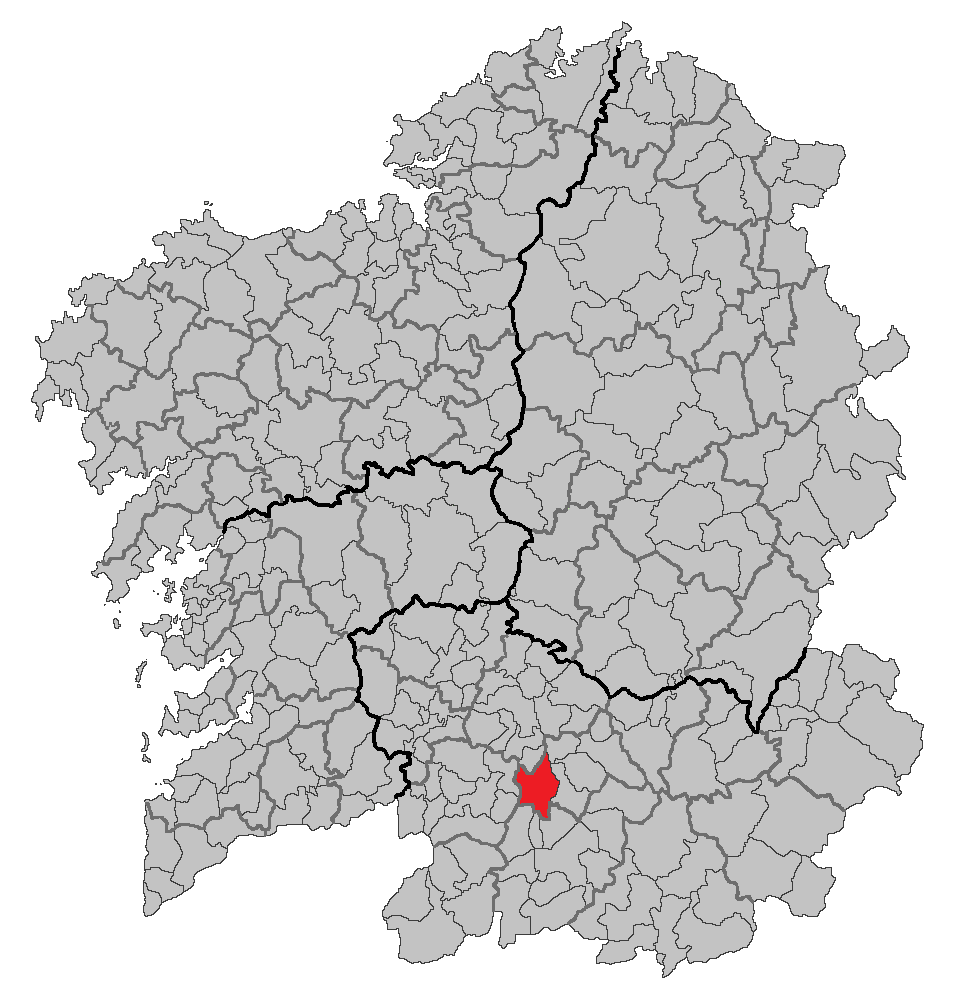
- Situation of Allariz within Galicia
- Country: Spain
- Autonomous community: Galicia
- Province: Ourense
- Comarca: Allariz – Maceda

Government
  - Alcalde (Mayor): Francisco García Suarez (BNG)

Area
  - Total: 85.3 km^{2} (32.9 sq mi)

Population (2025-01-01)
  - Total: 6,497
  - Density: 76.2/km^{2} (197/sq mi)
- Time zone: UTC+1 (CET)
  - Summer (DST): UTC+2 (CET)
- Postal Code: 32660
- INE municipality code: 32001
- Website: www.allariz.gal

Allariz is a town and municipality (Galician: Concello) in the province of Ourense, in the autonomous community of Galicia, Spain. It occupies the center of the western half of the province, connecting with the towns (concellos) of Taboadela, Paderne, Sandiás, Vilar de Santos, Rairiz de Veiga, Xunqueira de Ambía, A Merca and A Bola. The area of the municipality is 85,3 km² and there are 6.188 inhabitants in 16 parishes.

The hydrographic system is made up of the River Arnoia, which crosses the municipality from east to west. The surrounding hills are covered with pine and native oak. The valley itself is very fertile and the river banks are lined with trees. The climate can be defined as inland Atlantic with continental influences. Summers are warm with highs averaging 25 °C, while winter highs average 12 °C.

Allariz is a town which relies on tourism and proximity to the provincial capital of Ourense, fifteen kilometers away. Because of its picturesque location on the banks of the Arnoia, it is a sought-after location for summer houses. The main highway crossing the south of Galicia, the Autovia das Rias Baixas, crosses the Arnoia on one of the longest highway bridges in Spain and provides easy access to the town.

== History ==
Local life had its origin in the castro which dominates the Arnoia. Little is known about development of the town until the barbarian invasions of the seventh century. Legends attribute its foundation to the Suevian chieftain Alaric. All that is known is that its first name was Villa Alaricii.

In the twelfth century a royal fortress of the Galaico-Leonese dynasty was built on the hill overlooking the modern town. Between the years 1132 and 1140 it was the key in the wars against the expansion of Portugal, and thanks to its defense the south of Galicia was not absorbed into Portugal. Alfonso VII of Castile gave it the title of town or foro. Everything indicates that the Castle of Allariz was always a residence of the royal families and place of education for the princes.

At the end of the fourteenth century the opposition between the royal power, represented by Allariz, and the episcopal power of Ourense increased. In 1446 Juan II of Castile gave the town to the Count of Benavente, who wanted it for his designs of dominating Galicia. In 1471 the Irmandiños de Galicia besieged the castle, helped by the people in the town. This siege lasted nine months. Later powerful families built their houses and palaces. New churches were built and Allariz lived an era of prosperity, as it had before under royal protection.

The French invasion during the Peninsular War destroyed many churches and caused great loss in the town, but the army of Soult, defeated in Porto, found refuge in the town. The period of desamortization (19th century) ruined the Monastery and was the cause of the destruction of the castle and the town walls, whose stones were used to build the road to Ourense.

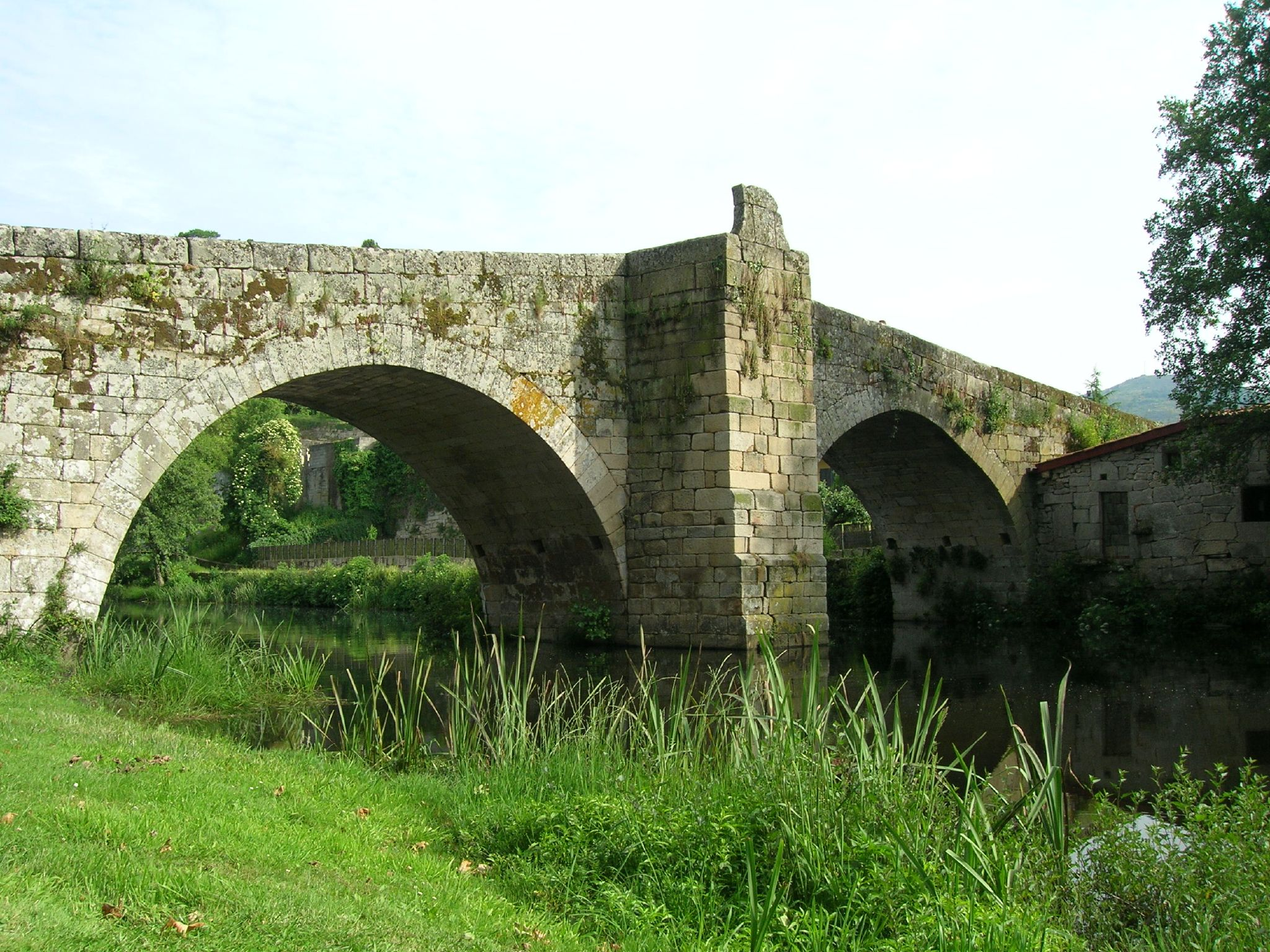
Vilanova Bridge, Allariz

Allariz had a Jewish community ever since the 11th century. Upon a complaint of the prior of the monastery of Allariz in 1289, the Jewish congregation of the town was notified that they were no longer permitted to live outside the Jewish quarter. Christians were also prohibited from living in that quarter.

== Politics ==
Municipal elections
Party/List	1979	1983	1987	1991	1995	1999	2003	2007	2011	2015
BNPG / BNG	5	2	4	10	10	10	8	9	9	9
AP / PP		6	5	2	2	3	4	3	4	3
PSdeG-PSOE		2	2			-	1	1	-	1
CG / CPG		3	2							
EU					1	-				
UCD / CDS	8			1						
Total	13	13	13	13	13	13	13	13	13	13

== Tourist sites ==
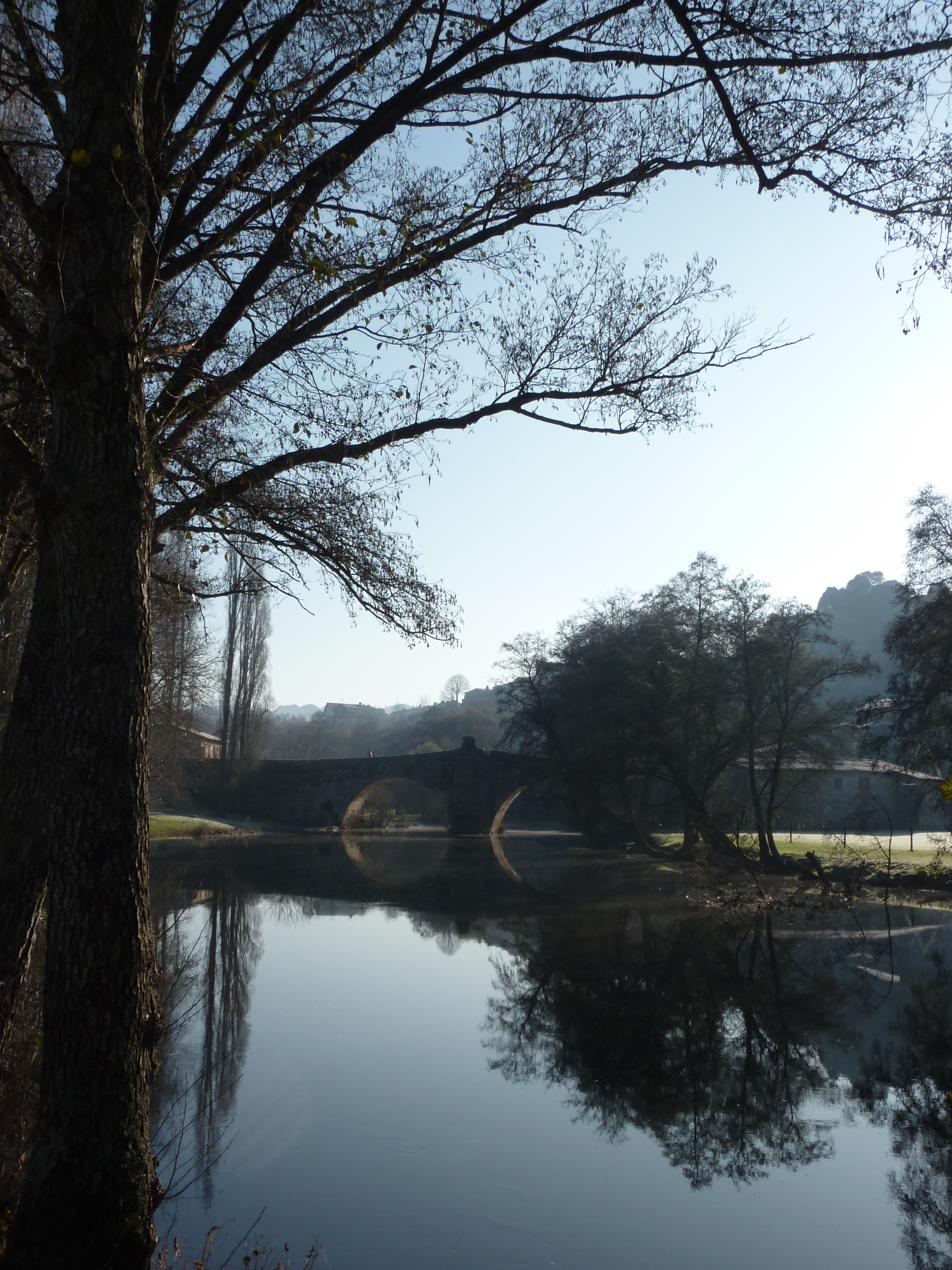
The Arnoia river

Allariz constitutes one of the most important historical-artistic sites of Galicia. In the town there are admirable examples of military, religious, and civil elements. Today it preserves its medieval character, reflected in its monuments and in its cobblestone streets.

We must mention the chapel of San Bieito and the Real Mosteiro de Santa Clara, with one of the largest cloisters in Spain. A fundamental example of Galego romanesque architecture is the parish church of Santiago and the bridge of Vilanova.

The highlight of the town is doubtlessly the area around the Arnoia River, which has been converted into a parkland with paths following the riverbanks under ancient oak trees. Abandoned leather factories have been restored and converted into restaurants and a museum.

== Festa do Boi (Festival of the Ox) ==
According to this legend, with heavy antisemitic overtones, the festival began in the Middle Ages. The Jewish community tried to ruin the Corpus Christi procession when it was crossing their street on the way to the Church of Santo Estevo. Supposedly the Jews insulted the people, made fun of the religious symbols and provoked the priests and monks. This is when Xan de Arzúa appeared, a man of religious convictions, who decided to appear one year riding a bull pulled by his servants who carried sacks with ants and ashes to throw at the faces of the disrespectful Jews.

In memory of this happening, every year during the festival of Corpus Christi, garlanded oxen run through the streets of the town. Flour with ants is also thrown at bystanders to remember the legendary Xan de Arzúa. A cloth figure representing Xan is carried in procession to the town hall where it is hung on the balcony. The original antisemitic background to the festival has been forgotten by most modern viewers.
