= Meira (disambiguation) =

Meira is a municipality in Galicia, Spain.

Meira may also refer to:

- Meira (comarca), a comarca in Galicia, Spain
- Meira (weevil), a beetle genus in the tribe Peritelini
- Meira (yeast genus), a mite-associated basidiomycete yeast with three recently described species, placed in Class Exobasidiomycetes (Ustilaginomycotina)

== People with the surname ==
- Fernando Meira (born 1978), a Portuguese football player
- Mateus da Costa Meira, Brazilian mass murderer
- Mateus Meira Rita, a São Toméan politician
- Sérgio Meira, a Brazilian linguist
- Silvio Meira, a Brazilian computer scientist
- Tarcísio Meira (1935–2021), a Brazilian actor
- Vítor Meira (born 1977), a Brazilian auto racing driver

== People with the first name ==
- Meira Kumar (born 1945), an Indian politician and Member of Parliament, who was the first elected woman Speaker of the Lok Sabha.
- Meira (Jo Meira Strogatz) - songwriter, singer

== See also ==
- Meira Oy, a Finnish spice and coffee company
