= Antía Cal =

Spanish author and autobiographer (1923–2022)

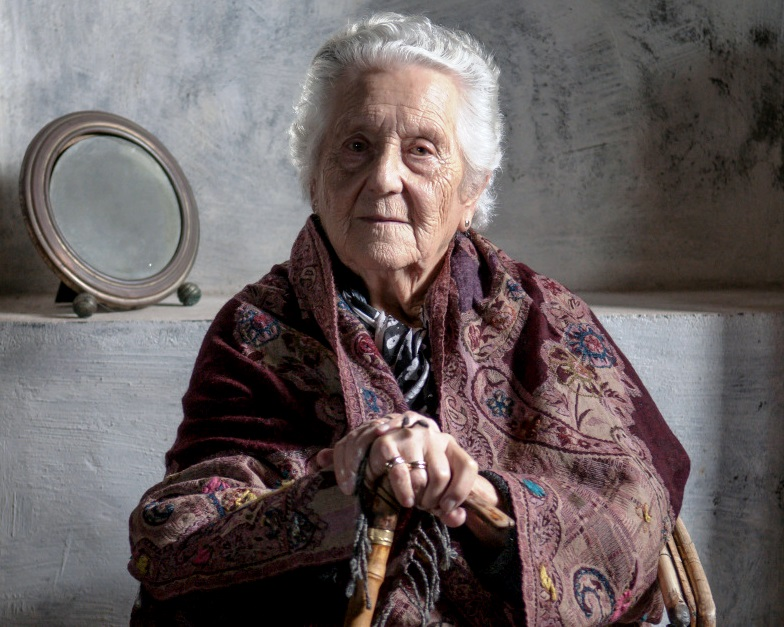
Antía Cal Vázquez

Antía Cal Vázquez (1923-2022) was a Spanish writer and autobiographer. She was born on April 18, 1923, in Havana and died in Meira on March 30, 2022.

She was posthumously awarded the Civil Order of Alfonso X the Wise.
