= Maceda, Ourense =

Maceda
- Municipality
- Coat of arms

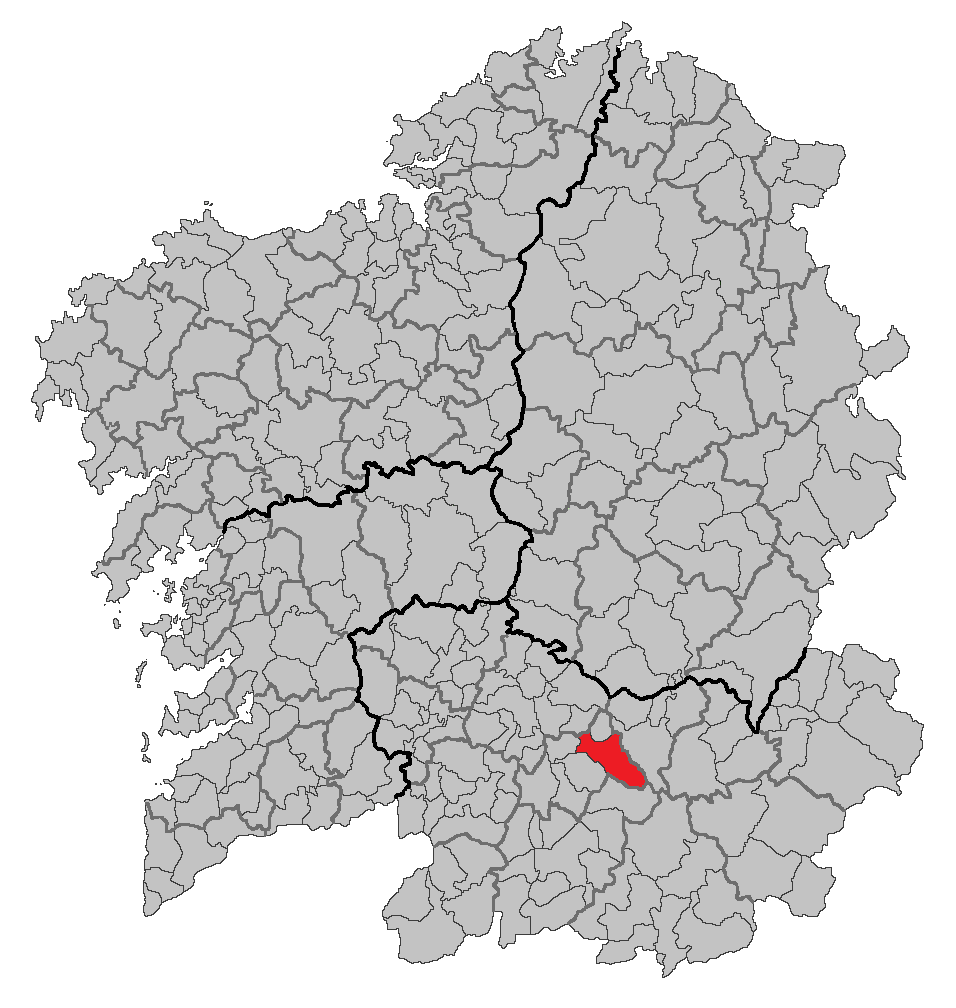
- Location in Galicia

- Location in Spain
- Coordinates: 42°16′15″N 7°39′03″W
- Country: Spain
- Autonomous community: Galicia
- Province: Ourense
- Comarca: Allariz – Maceda

Government
  - Mayor: Uxía Oviedo (PSdeG-PSOE)

Area
  - Total: 101.9 km^{2} (39.3 sq mi)
- Elevation: 581 m (1,906 ft)

Population (2025-01-01)
  - Total: 2,874
  - Density: 28.20/km^{2} (73.05/sq mi)
- Time zone: UTC+1 (CET)
  - Summer (DST): UTC+2 (CEST)
- Website: Official website

Maceda is a municipality in the province of Ourense, in the autonomous community of Galicia, Spain. It belongs to the comarca of Allariz – Maceda.

== See also ==
- A Agualada, Coristanco
- Costoya
