= Carmen Agulló Díaz =

Spanish professor, writer (born 1957)

Dr. Carmen Agulló Díaz
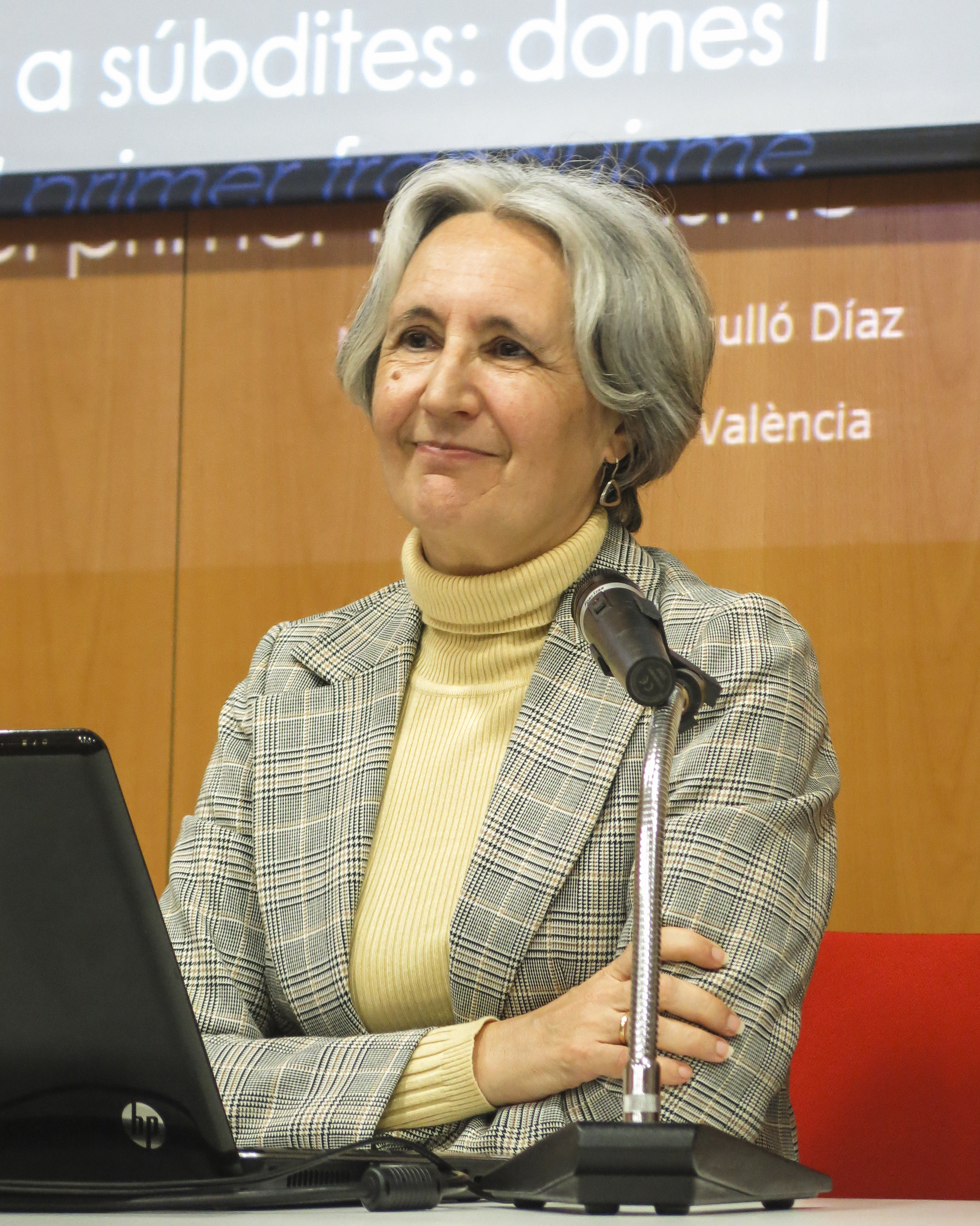
- Carmen Agulló Díaz (2022)
- Born: María de Carmen Agulló Díaz; 1957 (age 68–69); Xinzo de Limia, Province of Ourense, Spain
- Occupations: Tenured professor; non-fiction author

Academic background
- Education: Ph.D. in Pedagogy
- Alma mater: University of Valencia
- Thesis: La educación de la mujer durante el franquismo y su evolución en Valencia (1951-1970) (1994)
- Doctoral advisor: Juan Manuel Fernández Soria

Academic work
- Discipline: Theory and History of Education
- Sub-discipline: History of female education, especially in Republican teachers
- Institutions: Professor, University of Valencia; Co-founder and first president, Institut d'Estudis de la Vall d'Albaida (IEVA)

María de Carmen Agulló Díaz (Xinzo de Limia, Province of Ourense, 1957) is a Spanish tenured professor of Theory and History of Education at the University of Valencia. In addition to being a book writer, she is one of the most prestigious researchers in the Spanish environment around the history of women's education, especially in Republican teachers. She is also highly recognized in this field for her participation in the documentary directed by Pilar Pérez Solano in 2013, Las Maestras de la República, winner of the Goya award for best documentary film in 2014. Though she is a native Galician, Agulló Díaz has lived in the Valencian Community since 1978.

== Education ==
Agulló Díaz began her studies at the Santa Marina de Ginzo de Limia Academy. She received her Baccalaureate at the Colegio de las Carmelitas de Orense and the Instituto Nacional Femenino de Vigo. She studied Pedagogy and Psychology at the University of Santiago de Compostela and earned a degree in Psychology at the Complutense University of Madrid and the University of Valencia. She holds degrees in Psychology, Philosophy, and Educational Sciences, and she has a Ph.D. in Pedagogy. Her doctoral thesis La educación de la mujer durante el franquismo y su evolución en Valencia (1951-1970) (1994) was directed by Juan Manuel Fernández Soria.

== Career and research ==
Agulló Díaz is a tenured professor at the Department of Comparative Education and History of Education at the University of Valencia. Despite having worked as a psychologist in the municipal cabinet in the Llutxent City Council, she went on to teach classes at the Faculties of Philosophy and Educational Sciences and Teaching, in Valencia and Ontinyent.

Her work as a researcher is aimed at recovering the history of education in Valencia, especially during the period of the Second Spanish Republic and the Franco regime, also focusing on giving women a voice during the history of education and the recovery of Valencian historical educational heritage and the defense of public education.

Her publications include Maestras valencianas republicanas, Una escuela rural republicana, with her partner, also a teacher, Juan Manuel Fernández Soria; La renovación pedagógica en el País Valenciano, with professor Alejandro Mayordomo Pérez; and her ultimate publication, Antonia Maymón. Anarquista, maestra, naturista, with Pilar Molina Beneyto.7 Mestres de Mestres. 150 anys de formació de mestres valencianes, co-authored with Blanca Juan, is a pioneering investigation on the Escuela Normal Femenina de Valencia.

Agulló Díaz serves as vice-president of the Sociedad de Historia de la Educación de los Países de Lengua Catalana (a subsidiary of the Institute for Catalan Studies), an association founded in 1979. Here, she has been a member of the organizing committee of the XXII Conference on the History of Education and of the eighth edition of the journal, Jornadas de Historia de la educación.

She was a founding member and first president of the Institut d'Estudis de la Vall d'Albaida (IEVA). In 2016, she was awarded the prize for the Trayectoria Individual de Escuela Valenciana, and the following year, 2017, she received the Nueve de octubre prize that the Ontinyent City Council awards each year in recognition of effort and attitude for the benefit of society.

== Selected works ==
- Agulló Díaz, M. C. (1991). Escola i República: Montaverner (1931-1939). Montaberner: Ayuntamiento de Montaberner.
- Agulló Díaz, M. C. 1994). Escola i República: la Vall d'Albaida, 1931-1939. Valencia: Diputación de Valencia.
- Agulló Díaz, M. C. (1994). La educación de la mujer durante el franquismo y su evolución en Valencia (1951-1970). Valencia: Universidad de Valencia.
- Agulló Díaz, M. C. & Fernández Sòria, J. M. (1999). Maestros valencianos bajo el franquismo: la depuración del magisterio, 1939-1944. València: Institució Alfons el Magnànim.
- Agulló Díaz, M. C., Espí Espí, V. & Juan Soriano, E.(2001). Memòria de la utopia: CCOO de la Vall d’Albaida. Benicull del Xúquer: 7 i Mig.
- Agulló Díaz, M. C. & Fernández Sòria, J. M. (2002). Los temas educativos en las Memorias del Magisterio Valenciano (1908-1909). Valencia: Universidad de Valencia.
- Agulló Díaz, M. C., Calpe Clemente, V. & Fernández Sória, J. M. (2004). Una escuela rural republicana. Valencia: Universidad de Valencia.
- Agulló Díaz, M. C. & Mayordomo Pérez, A. (2004). La renovació pedagògica al País Valencià. Valencia: Universidad de Valencia.
- Agulló Díaz, M. C. (2008). Mestres valencianes republicanes: las luces de la República. Valencia: Universidad de Valencia.
- Agulló Díaz, M. C. & Payà Rico, A. (2012). Les cooperatives d’ensenyament al País Valencià i la renovació pedagògica (1968-1976). Valencia: Universidad de Valencia.
- Agulló Díaz, M. C. & Molina Beneyto, P. (2014). Antonia Maymon: anarquista, maestra, naturista. Barcelona: Virus.
- Agulló Díaz, M. C. (2019) introduction to Leonor Serrano's book, Dones, treball i educació. Vich: Eumo.
- Agulló Díaz, M. C. & Juan Agulló, Blanca (2020) "Mestres de mestres. 150 anys de formació de mestres valencianes". Valencia: PUV.
- Martorell, Manu; Marqués, Salomó; Agulló Díaz, M. C. (2019) "Pioneres. Història i compromís de les germanes Úriz Pi". Barcelona: Pollen.
