= Sarreaus =

- Municipality
- Coat of arms

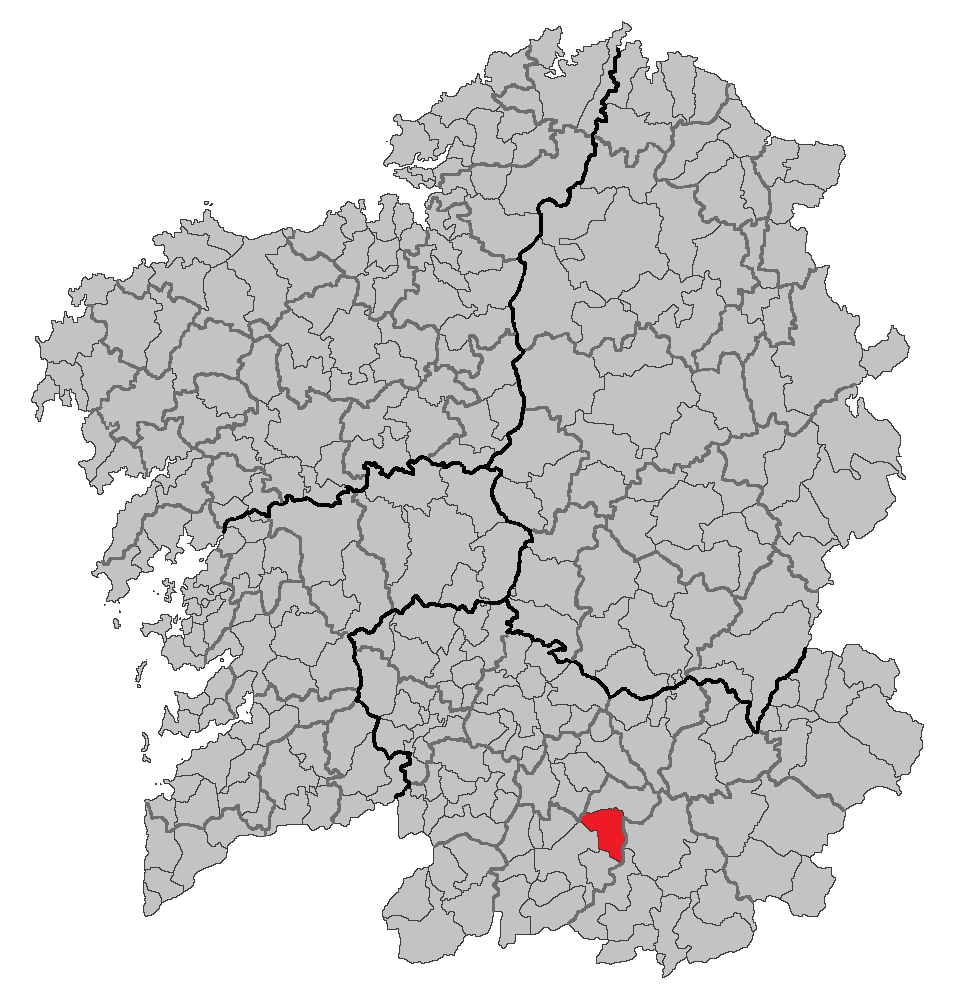
- Location in Galicia

- Location in Spain
- Country: Spain
- Autonomous community: Galicia
- Province: Ourense
- Comarca: A Limia

Government
  - Mayor: Gumersindo Lamas Alvar (PPdeG)

Area
  - Total: 77.3 km^{2} (29.8 sq mi)
- Elevation: 644 m (2,113 ft)

Population (2025-01-01)
  - Total: 1,068
  - Density: 13.8/km^{2} (35.8/sq mi)
- Time zone: UTC+1 (CET)
  - Summer (DST): UTC+2 (CEST)
- Website: www.concellosarreaus.com/

Sarreaus is a municipality in the province of Ourense, in the autonomous community of Galicia, Spain. It belongs to the comarca of A Limia.
