= Vilar de Barrio =

- Municipality
- Coat of arms

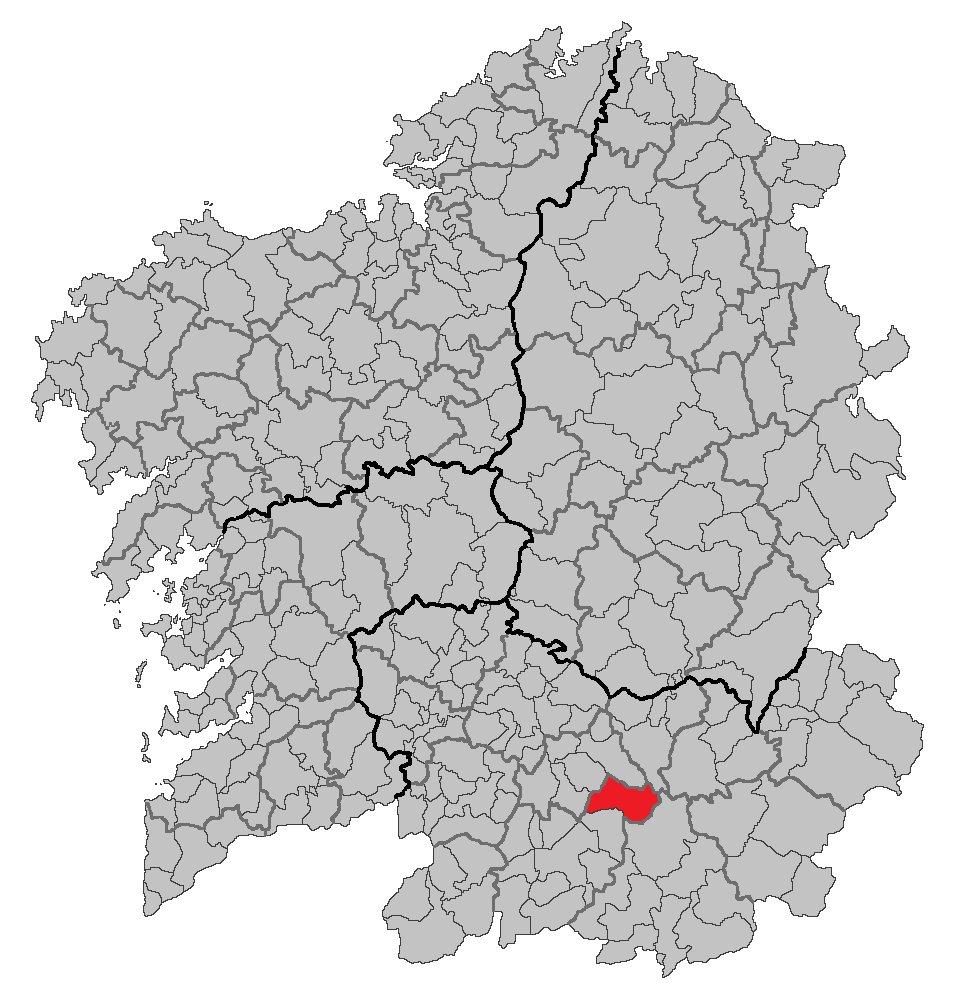
- Location in Galicia

- Location in Spain
- Coordinates: 42°09′35″N 7°36′42″W
- Country: Spain
- Autonomous community: Galicia
- Province: Ourense
- Comarca: A Limia

Government
  - Mayor: Alfredo Casado Souto (People's Party)

Area
  - Total: 106.7 km^{2} (41.2 sq mi)
- Elevation: 666 m (2,185 ft)

Population (2025-01-01)
  - Total: 1,178
  - Density: 11.04/km^{2} (28.59/sq mi)
- Time zone: UTC+1 (CET)
  - Summer (DST): UTC+2 (CEST)
- Website: viladebarrio.gal

Vilar de Barrio is a municipality in the centre of the province of Ourense, in the autonomous community of Galicia, Spain. It belongs to the comarca of A Limia.
