= Xunqueira de Espadanedo =

- municipality
- Flag Coat of arms

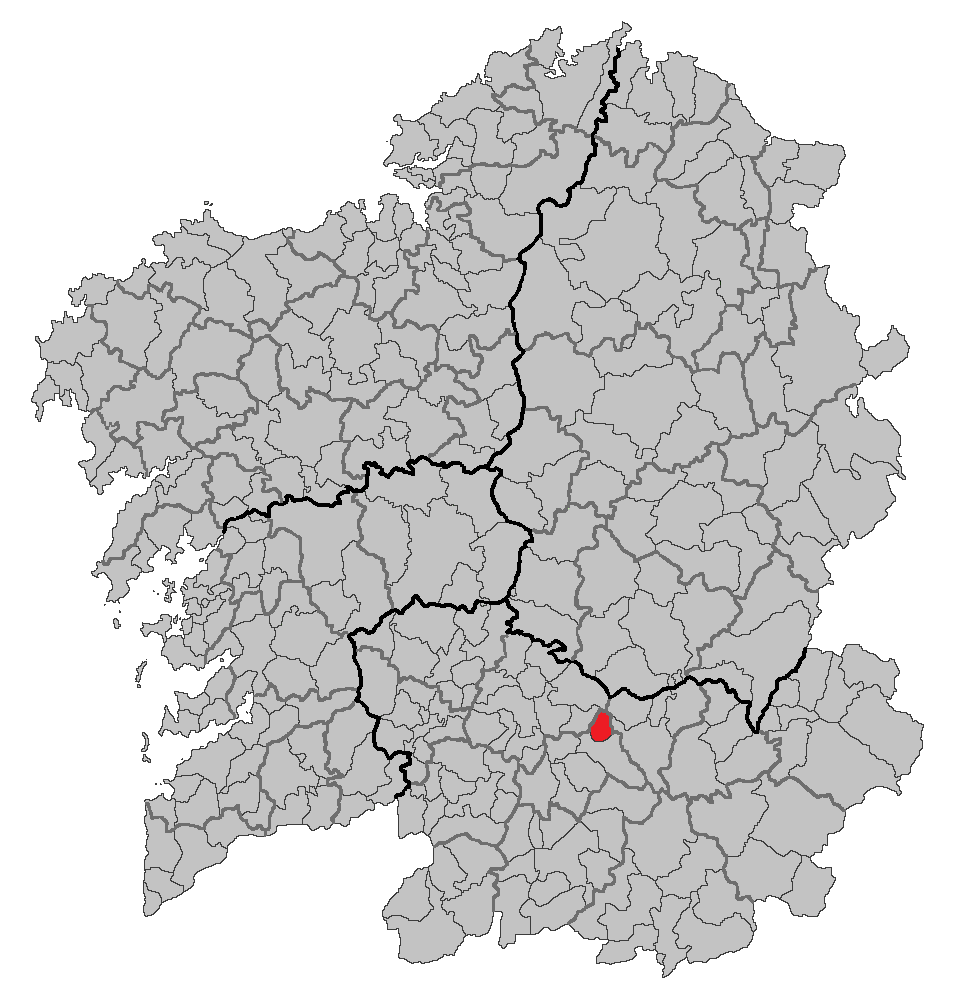
- Location in Galicia

- Location in Spain
- Coordinates: 42°19′03″N 7°37′43″W
- Country: Spain
- Autonomous community: Galicia
- Province: Ourense
- Comarca: Allariz – Maceda

Government
  - Mayor: Ricardo González Lage (PP)

Area
  - Total: 27.6 km^{2} (10.7 sq mi)
- Elevation: 678 m (2,224 ft)

Population (2025-01-01)
  - Total: 696
  - Density: 25.2/km^{2} (65.3/sq mi)
- Time zone: UTC+1
  - Summer (DST): UTC+2 (CEST)

Xunqueira de Espadanedo is a municipality in the province of Ourense, in the autonomous community of Galicia, Spain. It belongs to the comarca of Allariz – Maceda.

== Parroquias (Poblacións) ==
- Niñodaguia
- Xunqueira de Espadanedo
