= Baños de Molgas =

- Municipality
- Coat of arms

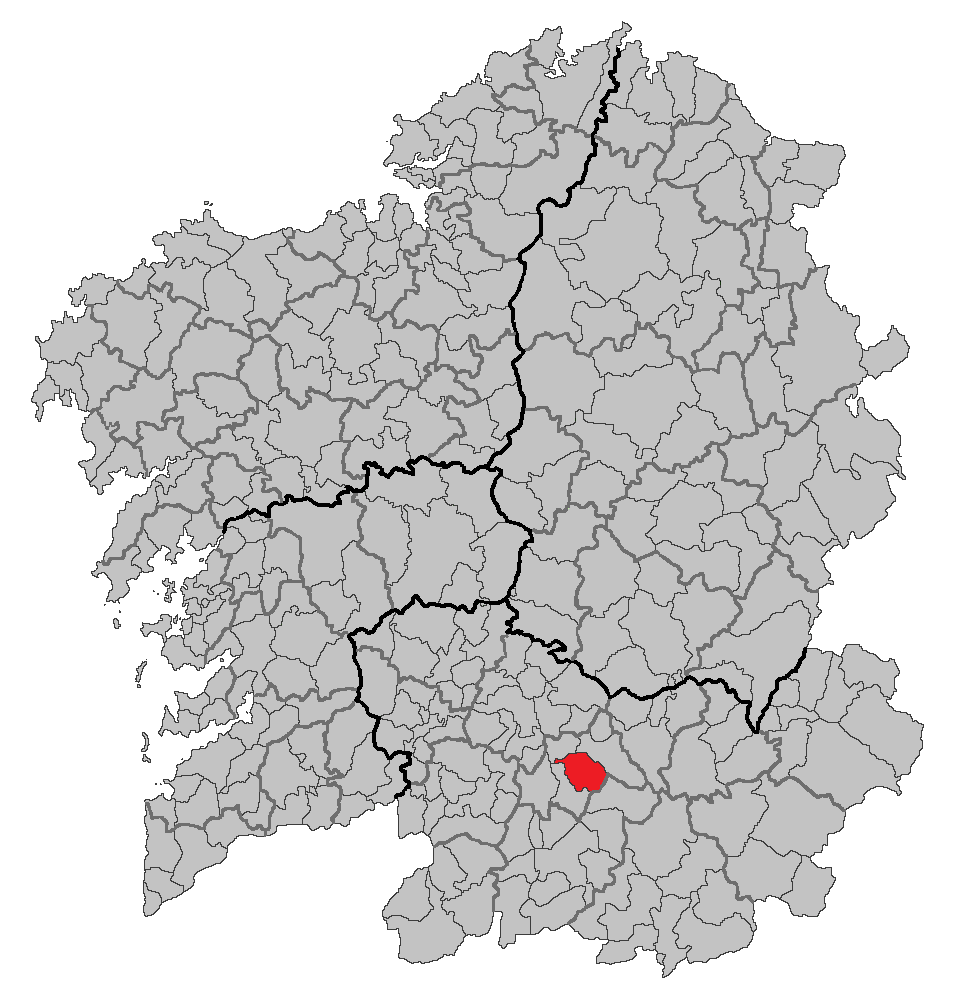
- Location in Galicia

- Location in Spain
- Country: Spain
- Autonomous community: Galicia
- Province: Ourense
- Comarca: Allariz – Maceda

Government
  - Mayor: Manuel Ángel Fernández Movilla (PP)

Area
  - Total: 67.6 km^{2} (26.1 sq mi)
- Elevation: 514 m (1,686 ft)

Population (2025-01-01)
  - Total: 1,471
  - Density: 21.8/km^{2} (56.4/sq mi)
- Time zone: UTC+1 (CET)
  - Summer (DST): UTC+2 (CEST)
- INE municipality code: 32007
- Website: Official website

Baños de Molgas is a municipality in the province of Ourense, in the autonomous community of Galicia, Spain. It belongs to the comarca of Allariz – Maceda.
