= A Limia =

Coordinates: 42.063°N 7.725°W

- Comarca
- Flag Coat of arms
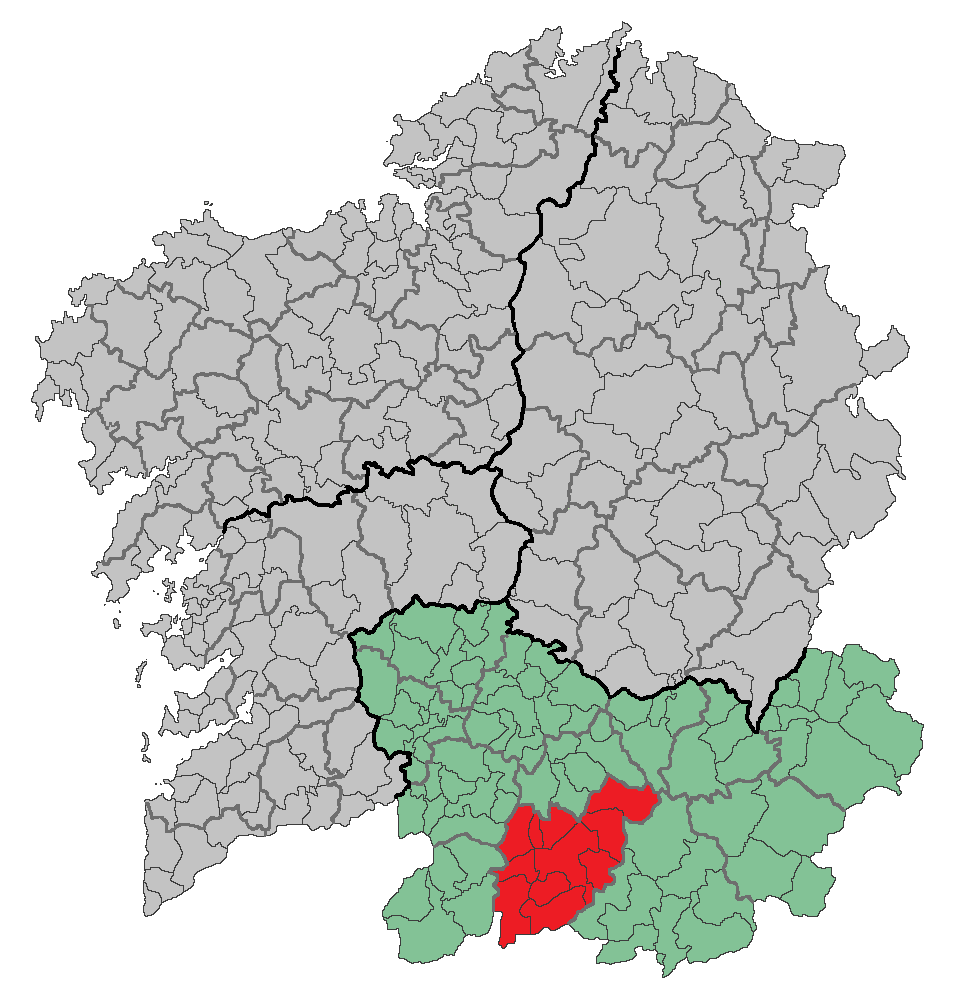
- Country: Spain
- Autonomous community: Galicia
- Province: Ourense
- Capital: Xinzo de Limia
- Municipalities: List: Baltar, Os Blancos, Calvos de Randín, Porqueira, Rairiz de Veiga, Sandiás, Sarreaus, Trasmiras, Vilar de Barrio, Vilar de Santos, Xinzo de Limia

Area
  - Total: 801.9 km^{2} (309.6 sq mi)

Population
  - Total: 20,075
  - Density: 25.03/km^{2} (64.84/sq mi)
- Time zone: UTC+1 (CET)
  - Summer (DST): UTC+2 (CEST)

A Limia is a comarca in the Galician Province of Ourense. The overall population of this local region is 20,075 (2019).

== Municipalities ==
Baltar, Os Blancos, Calvos de Randín, Porqueira, Rairiz de Veiga, Sandiás, Sarreaus, Trasmiras, Vilar de Barrio, Vilar de Santos and Xinzo de Limia.
