= Sandiás =

- Coat of arms

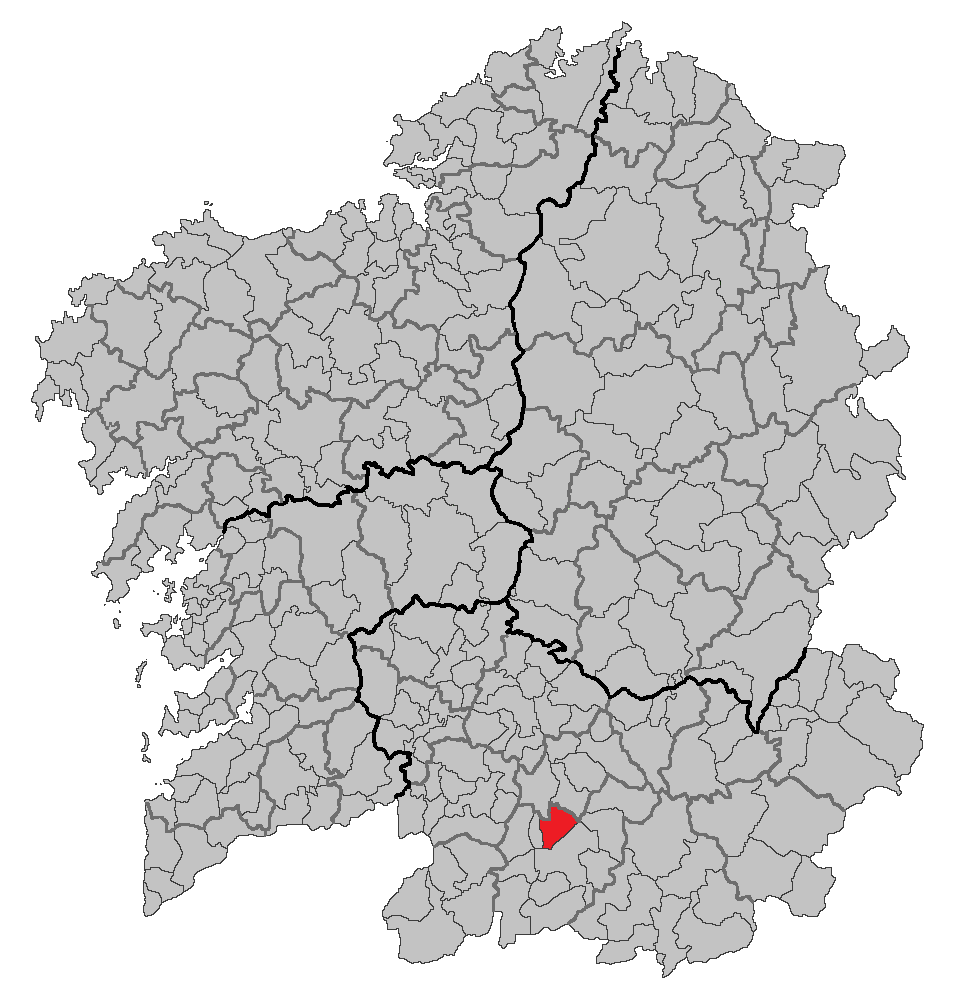
- Situation of Sandiás within Galicia

- Location in Spain
- Coordinates: 42°06′40″N 7°45′24″W
- Country: Spain
- Autonomous community: Galicia
- Province: Ourense
- Comarca: A Limia

Government
  - Alcalde (Mayor): Felipe Traveso García (AGRELSAN)

Area
  - Total: 52.8 km^{2} (20.4 sq mi)

Population (2025-01-01)
  - Total: 1,086
  - Density: 20.6/km^{2} (53.3/sq mi)
- Time zone: UTC+1 (CET)
  - Summer (DST): UTC+2 (CET)
- Website: www.sandias.es

Sandiás is a municipality of Galicia, Spain, next to Xinzo de Limia in the province of Ourense. Its estimated population is 1,585, distributed among 3 parishes (Couso de Limia, Piñeira de Arcos, Sandiás). Its area is 53 km^{2}, a great part of which is drained fields from the Antela lagoon. This is an agricultural area. Potatoes and cereals are the most important crop. Sand extractions are also important for local development.

== History ==
The first sign of inhabitants are the remains of lake dwellings (lake dwelling) in the Antela lagoon. Due to Roman milestone findings, it is known that a Roman road (Roman road XVIII or Via Nova) passed through the area; there is also a Roman mansion in the village of Sandiás.

In the Middle Ages, its castle witnessed the struggle for the secession of Portugal, fights among the nobles, and peasant riots. Portuguese and Southern Spanish pilgrims (Via the “Silver road”) went through Sandiás on their way to Santiago de Compostela (Way of St James).

== Important landmarks ==
The council has an interesting and rich historical artistic heritage. The religious architecture includes the Gothic church of Santo Estevo de Sandiás, a work by Bartolomé de Nosendo dating to around 1520.

The hermitage of San Bieito da Uceira has an only nave and it has a front crowned with a bulrush and a bell tower with two pyramids on the sides. Inside it, there is a baroque or neo classical altarpiece with the images of San Ramón, Santa Lucía and San Bieito. Other churches are Santa María in Couso de Limia, the chapel of Arcos, the chapel of Coalloso, the chapel in Zadagós...

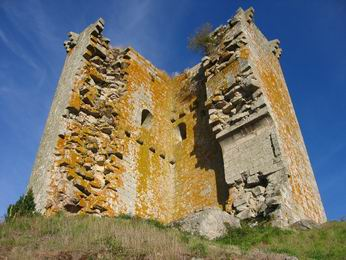

As for the civil constructions we can highlight the medieval tower of the Castro. Other interesting constructions are the three stately homes and a house that belonged to the nobility. The Casona in Santa Ana with L shape floor, with a big door and an interesting shield, has a chapel. The stately home of Espido presents a rectangular floor, a curious chimney and, on the main door, several shields. Its chapel with wooden baroque altarpiece is beside the building. Another stately home is the one of Penedo, risen in two stages. The first part is from the 16th century (1552) and the newest one from the 18th century (1758). This last one has rectangular floor. The chapel of the stately home dates from 1542. The third stately home is the one of Telleiro. Its U shape stands out, two shields and the wall that closes this building. It is thought to be from the late 17th century but it had important modifications in the following century. It also has a circular dovecote but it is not inside the wall. It used to have a chapel.

=== St. Stephen's church ===
An example of Galician renaissance art. Built before 1520. The front piece belongs to the ¨manuelino¨ style (Portuguese style, rare in Galicia). The altarpiece was built in 1603 by the famous Galician sculptor Bartolome de Moure. It has a nave and a rectangular apse, arches over columns with capitals with Renaissant motives.

=== The tower of the old castle ===
Probably built in the first half of the 12th century (although some legends say it was built in the 9th century), it was located over a castrum (Celtic settlement). It participated in the Portugal secession wars (XII). In 1386 it was assaulted by the duke of Lancaster, pretender to the Castile crown. In the 15th century it was demolished by a popular riot, and rebuilt later. It was a meeting point for troops in the wars with Portugal in the 18th century. There are many legends about this castle.
