= Os Blancos =

- Municipality
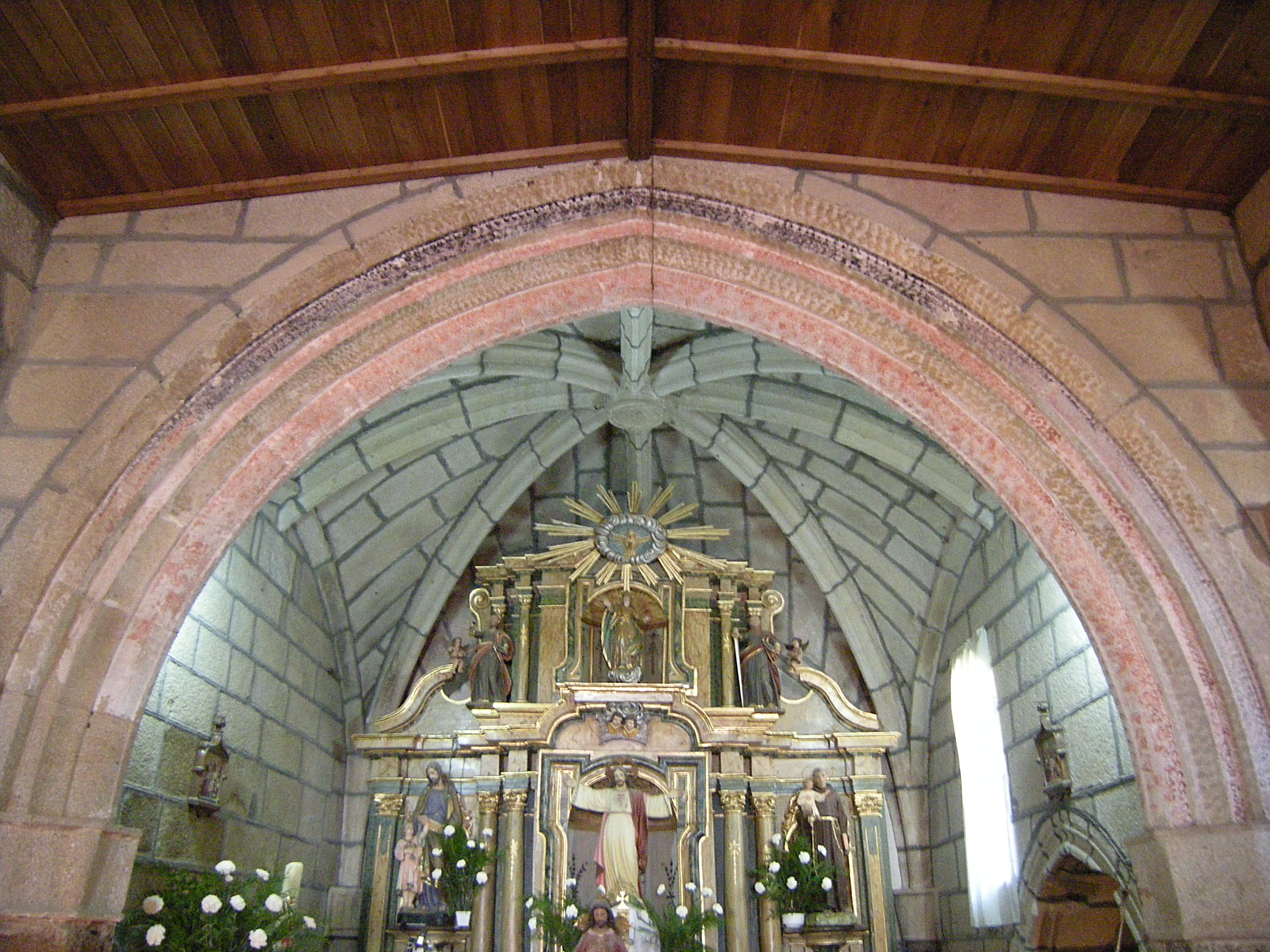
- Gothic arch of the church of Santa María de Covelas.

- Coat of arms

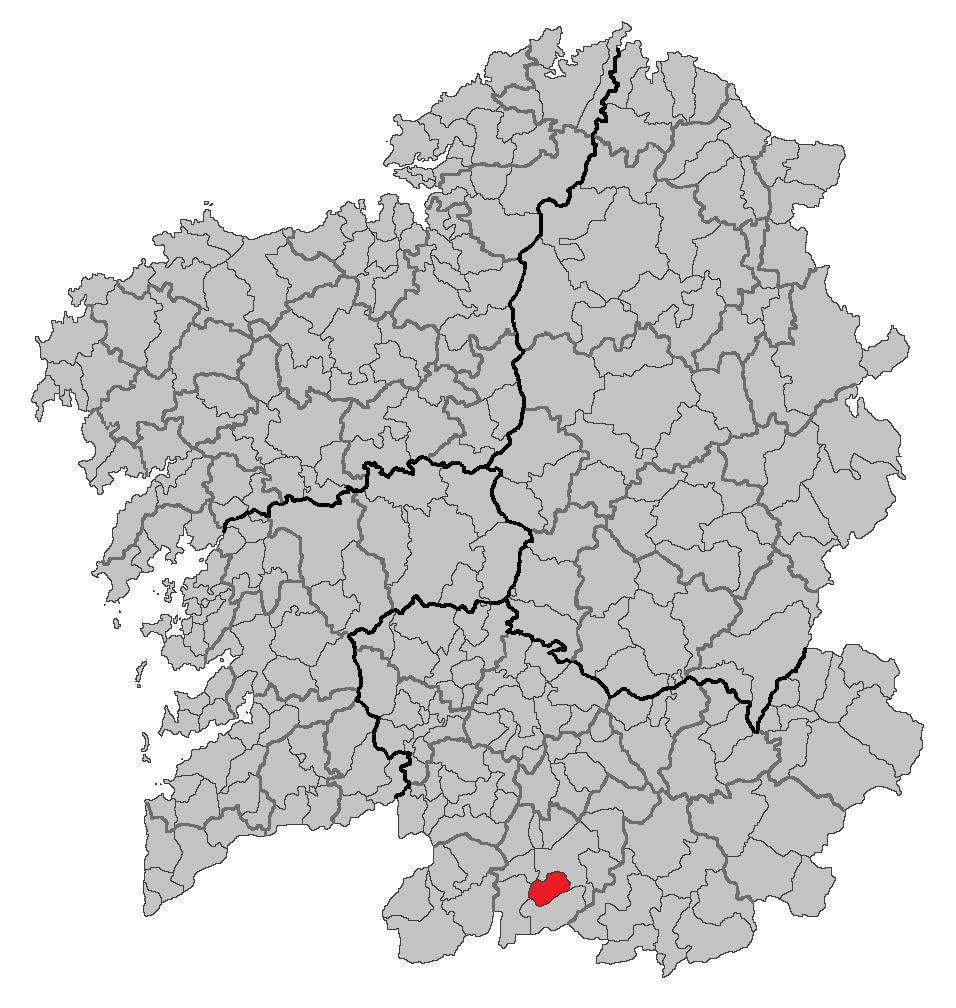
- Location in Galicia

- Location in Spain
- Coordinates: 42°00′17″N 7°43′01″W
- Country: Spain
- Autonomous community: Galicia
- Province: Ourense
- Comarca: A Limia

Government
  - Mayor: José Manuel Castro Blanco (PPdeG)

Area
  - Total: 47.6 km^{2} (18.4 sq mi)
- Elevation: 797 m (2,615 ft)

Population (2025-01-01)
  - Total: 696
  - Density: 14.6/km^{2} (37.9/sq mi)
- Time zone: UTC+1 (CET)
  - Summer (DST): UTC+2 (CEST)
- INE municipality code: 32012

Os Blancos is a municipality in the province of Ourense, in the autonomous community of Galicia, Spain. It belongs to the comarca of A Limia.
