= Meira (comarca) =

Coordinates: 43.225°N 7.25°W

- Comarca
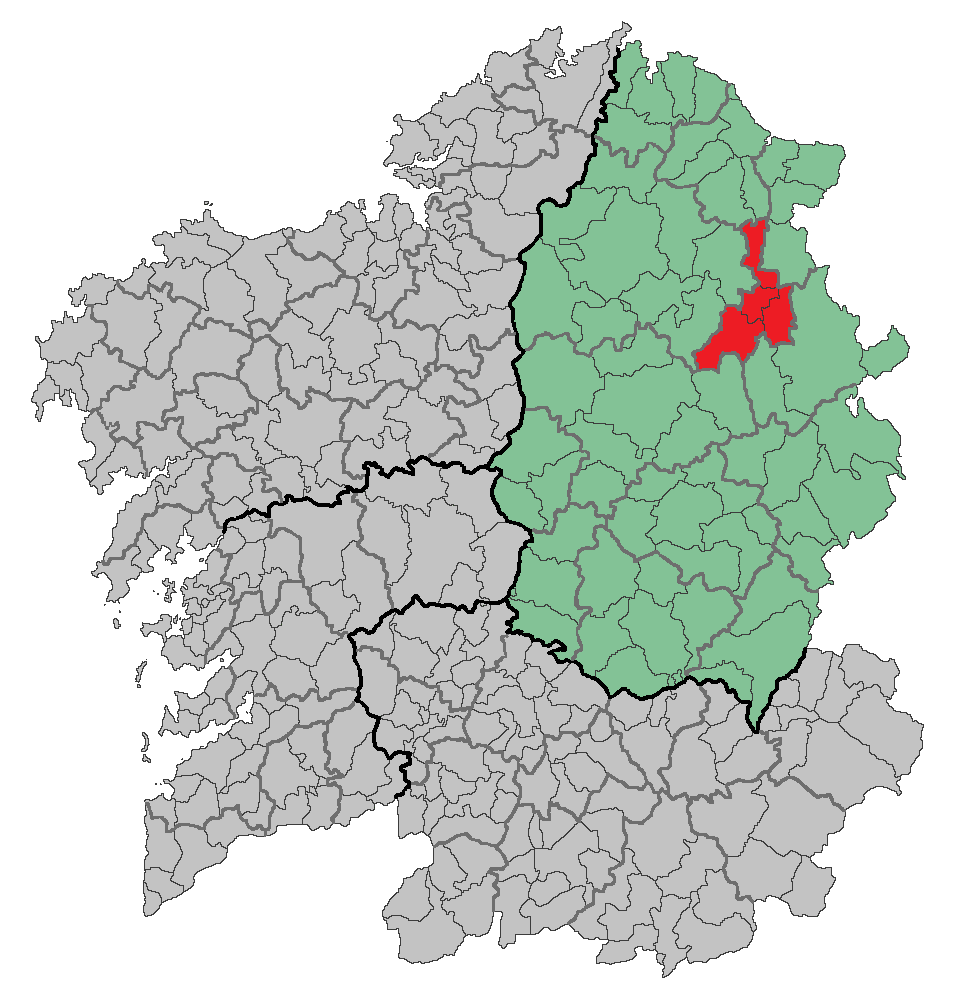
- Country: Spain
- Autonomous community: Galicia
- Province: Lugo
- Capital: Meira
- Municipalities: List: Meira, Pol, Ribeira de Piquín, Riotorto
- Time zone: UTC+1 (CET)
  - Summer (DST): UTC+2 (CEST)

Meira is a comarca in the Galician Province of Lugo. The overall population of this local region is 5,124 (2019).

== Municipalities ==
Meira, Pol, Ribeira de Piquín and Riotorto.
