= Allariz – Maceda =

Coordinates: 42°14′57″N 7°42′20″W

Allariz - Maceda
- Comarca
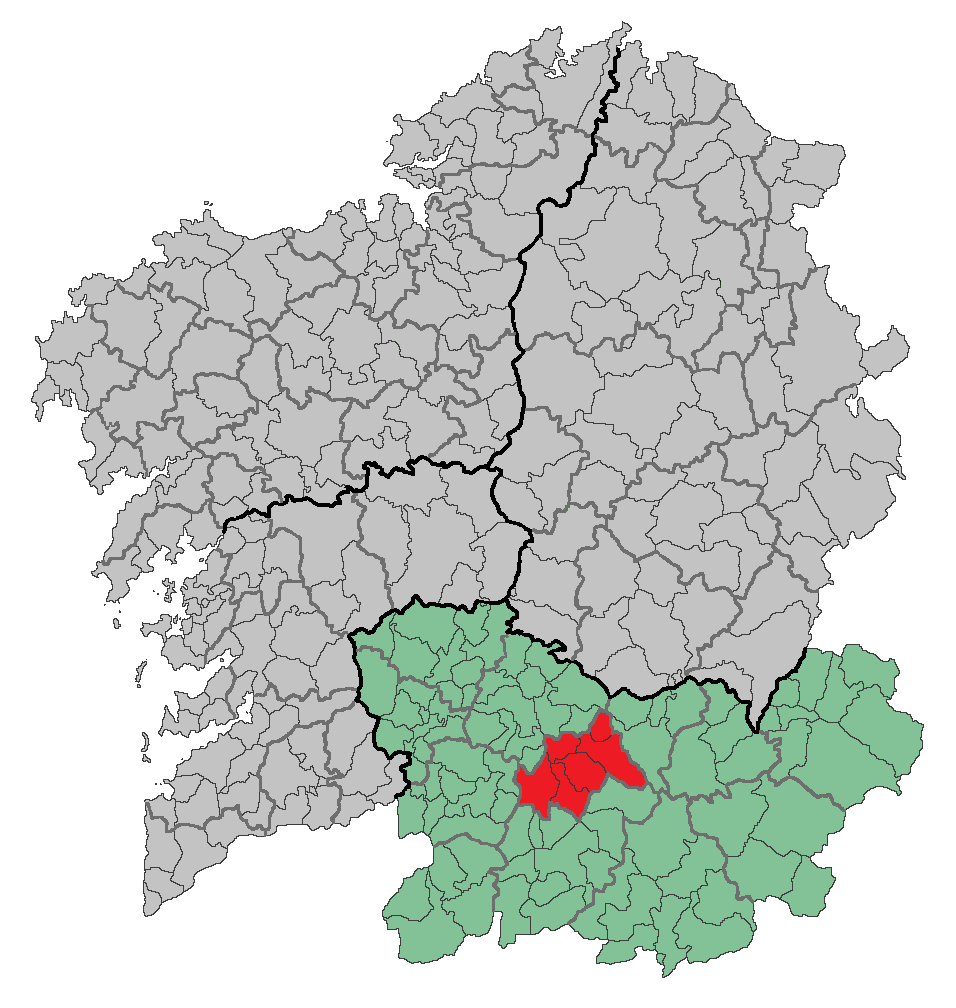
- Country: Spain
- Autonomous community: Galicia
- Province: Ourense
- Capital: Allariz
- Municipalities: List: Allariz, Baños de Molgas, Maceda, Paderne de Allariz, Xunqueira de Ambía, Xunqueira de Espadanedo

Area
  - Total: 383 km^{2} (148 sq mi)

Population (2019)
  - Total: 14,083
  - Density: 36.8/km^{2} (95.2/sq mi)
- Time zone: UTC+1 (CET)
  - Summer (DST): UTC+2 (CEST)

Allariz – Maceda is a comarca in the Galician Province of Ourense. The overall population of this local region is 14,083 (2019).

== Municipalities ==
Allariz, Baños de Molgas, Maceda, Paderne de Allariz, Xunqueira de Ambía and Xunqueira de Espadanedo.
