= Paderne de Allariz =

- Coat of arms

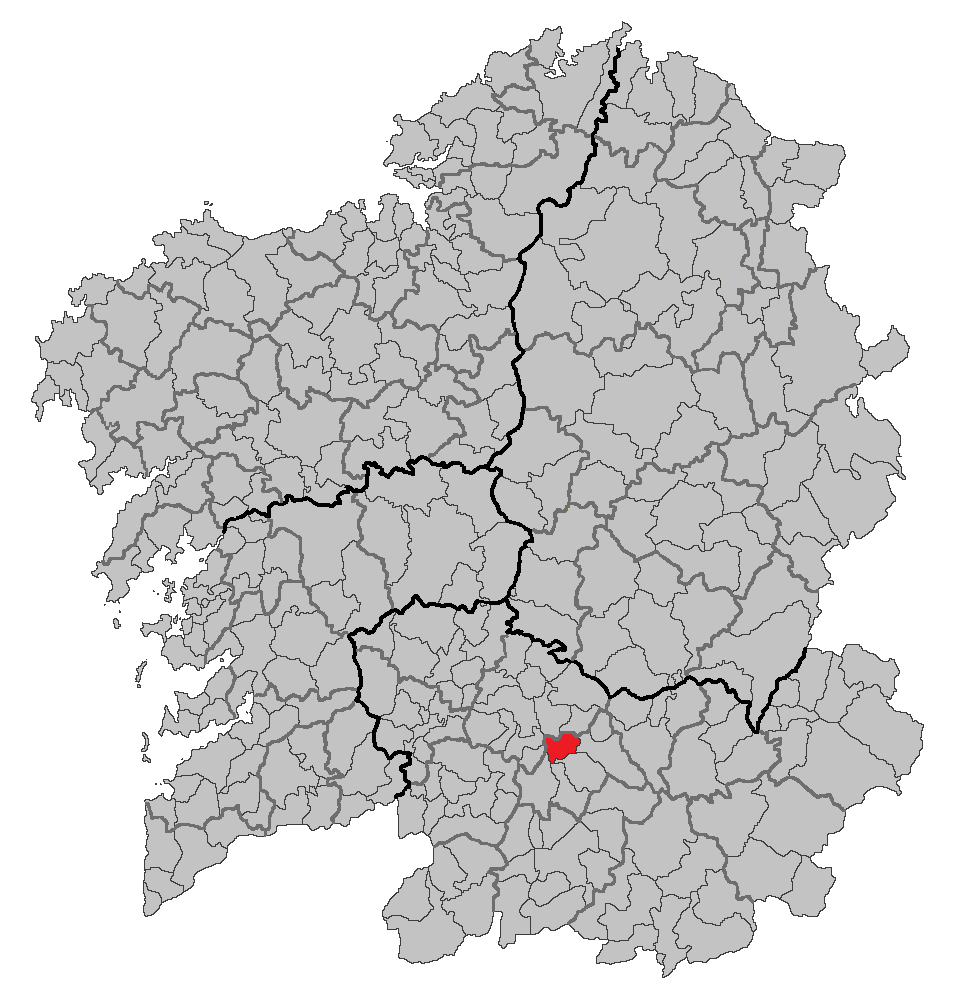
- Location in Galicia

- Location in Spain
- Coordinates: 42°16′39″N 7°44′45″W
- Country: Spain
- Autonomous community: Galicia
- Province: Ourense
- Comarca: Allariz-Maceda

Government
  - Mayor: José Manuel Fernández Gómez (PPdeG)

Area
  - Total: 38.8 km^{2} (15.0 sq mi)

Population (2025-01-01)
  - Total: 1,346
  - Density: 34.7/km^{2} (89.8/sq mi)

Paderne de Allariz is a municipality in the province of Ourense, in the autonomous community of Galicia, Spain. It belongs to the comarca of Allariz-Maceda.
