= Antonia Maymón =

Spanish writer, feminist and anarchist

Antonia Rufina Maymón Giménez (18 July 1881 – 20 December 1959) was a Spanish rationalist pedagogue, militant naturist, anarchist, and feminist who published books on various topics.

== Biography ==
Antonia Rufina Maymón Giménez was born on 18 July 1881, in Madrid, to an Aragonese family. She studied to be a teacher in the Escuela Normal Femenina of Zaragoza, a city where she also married professor Lorenzo Lagoon, an anarchist. For her membership in the National Committee against the war in Morocco, she was tried and convicted, along with Teresa Claramunt and Josefa Lopez. In those years, she published her first newspaper articles in various anarchist journals, as La Enseñanza Moderna (Modern Education) and Cultura y Acción (Culture and Action). The couple was exiled to Bordeaux in 1911, but she received amnesty two years later after the death of her husband. Upon her return, she spoke at rallies across the country and worked as a teacher in schools in Barcelona, Sant Feliu de Guíxols, Elda and Beniaján. Driving the naturist movement in Spain, she participated in and presided over congresses on these ideals in Bilbao and Málaga. After the proclamation of the Second Spanish Republic, she moved to Beniaján, where she settled permanently. There, she gave rallies for the Confederación Nacional del Trabajo (CNT), held a school in her own home and developed an intense social work program among the needy. In 1932, she published Estudios Racionalistas, where she exhibited her educational thoughts regarding children's education regardless of social class. At the end of the Spanish Civil War, she was convicted and imprisoned until 1944. Two years later, she was arrested and imprisoned again for almost a year. Her health impaired, she returned to her home Beniaján where she gave private lessons. She died in a local hospital on 20 December 1959.

== Selected works ==
=== Non-fiction ===
- Anarquismo y naturismo (1925) - Anarchism and Naturism
- Hacia el ideal (1927) - Toward the Ideal
- Amamos (1932), with others - We Love
- Humanidad libre. Esbozo racionalista - Free humanity. rationalist sketch

=== Novels ===
- Madre (1925) -Mother
- La perla (1927) -The Pearl
- El hijo del camino (1931) - The Son of the Road
