= Ribeira de Piquín =

- Municipality
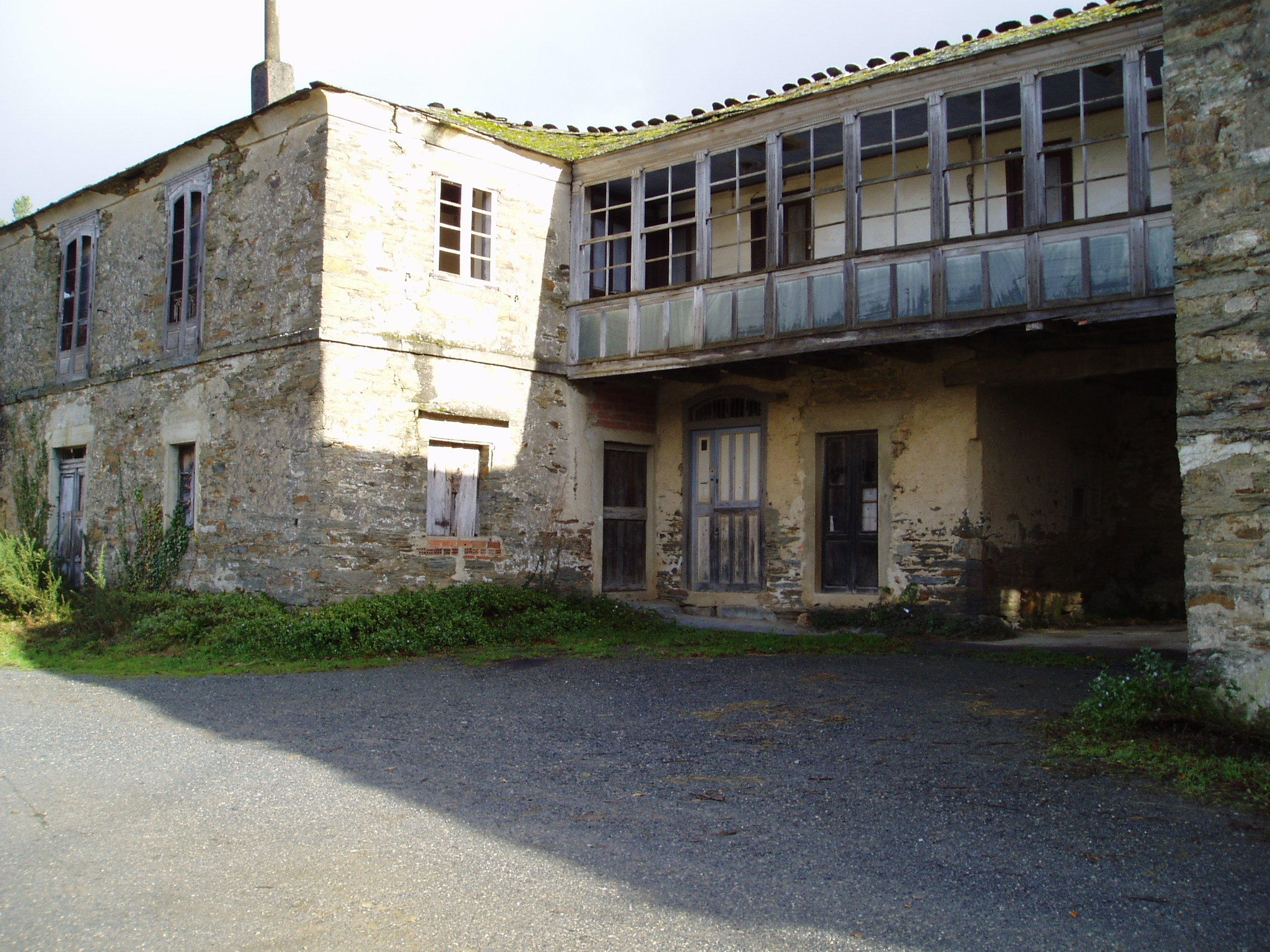

- Coat of arms

- Location in Spain.
- Coordinates: 43°11′23″N 7°10′59″W
- Country: Spain
- Community: Galicia
- Province: Lugo
- Comarca: Meira

Government
  - Mayor: Sabino Díaz Fernández

Area
  - Total: 72.99 km^{2} (28.18 sq mi)

Population (2025-01-01)
  - Total: 549
  - Density: 7.52/km^{2} (19.5/sq mi)
- Demonym: Ribeiregos
- Time zone: UTC+1 (CET)
  - Summer (DST): UTC+2 (CEST)
- Postal code: 27XXX
- Phone code: 982

Ribeira de Piquín is a town located in the province of Lugo, Galicia, northwestern Spain.
