= Rairiz de Veiga =

- Municipality
- Coat of arms

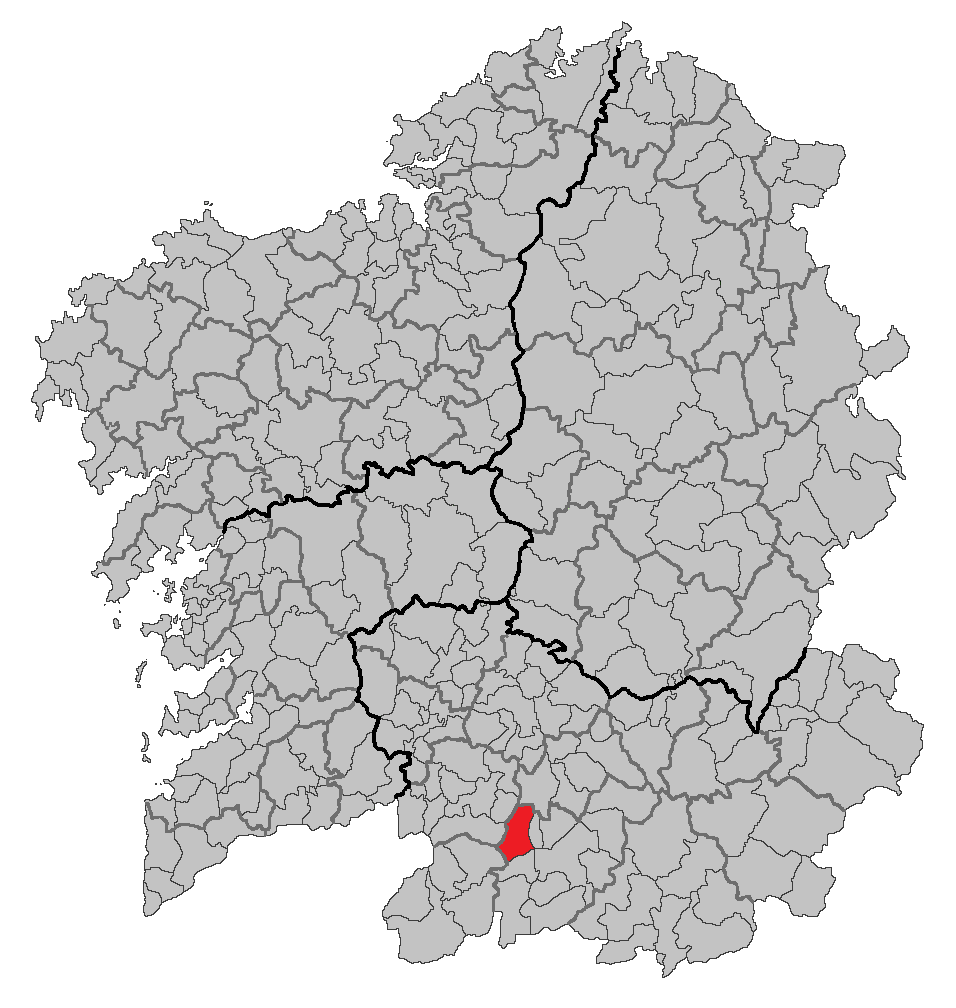
- Location in Galicia

- Location in Spain
- Coordinates: 42°05′N 7°50′W
- Country: Spain
- Autonomous community: Galicia
- Province: Ourense
- Comarca: A Limia

Government
  - Mayor: Josefa Asunción Morgade Rúa (PP)

Area
  - Total: 72.1 km^{2} (27.8 sq mi)
- Elevation: 622 m (2,041 ft)

Population (2025-01-01)
  - Total: 1,154
  - Density: 16.0/km^{2} (41.5/sq mi)
- Time zone: UTC+1 (CET)
  - Summer (DST): UTC+2 (CEST)
- Website: www.rairizdeveiga.es/

Rairiz de Veiga is a municipality in the province of Ourense, in the autonomous community of Galicia, Spain. It belongs to the comarca of A Limia.

== First same-sex marriage in the Iberian Peninsula ==
A same-sex marriage between two men, Pedro Dias and Muño Vandilas, occurred on 16 April 1061 in Rairiz de Veiga. They were married by a priest at a small chapel. The historic documents about the church wedding were found at Monastery of San Salvador de Celanova.
