= A Agualada, Coristanco =

A Agualada
- Parish
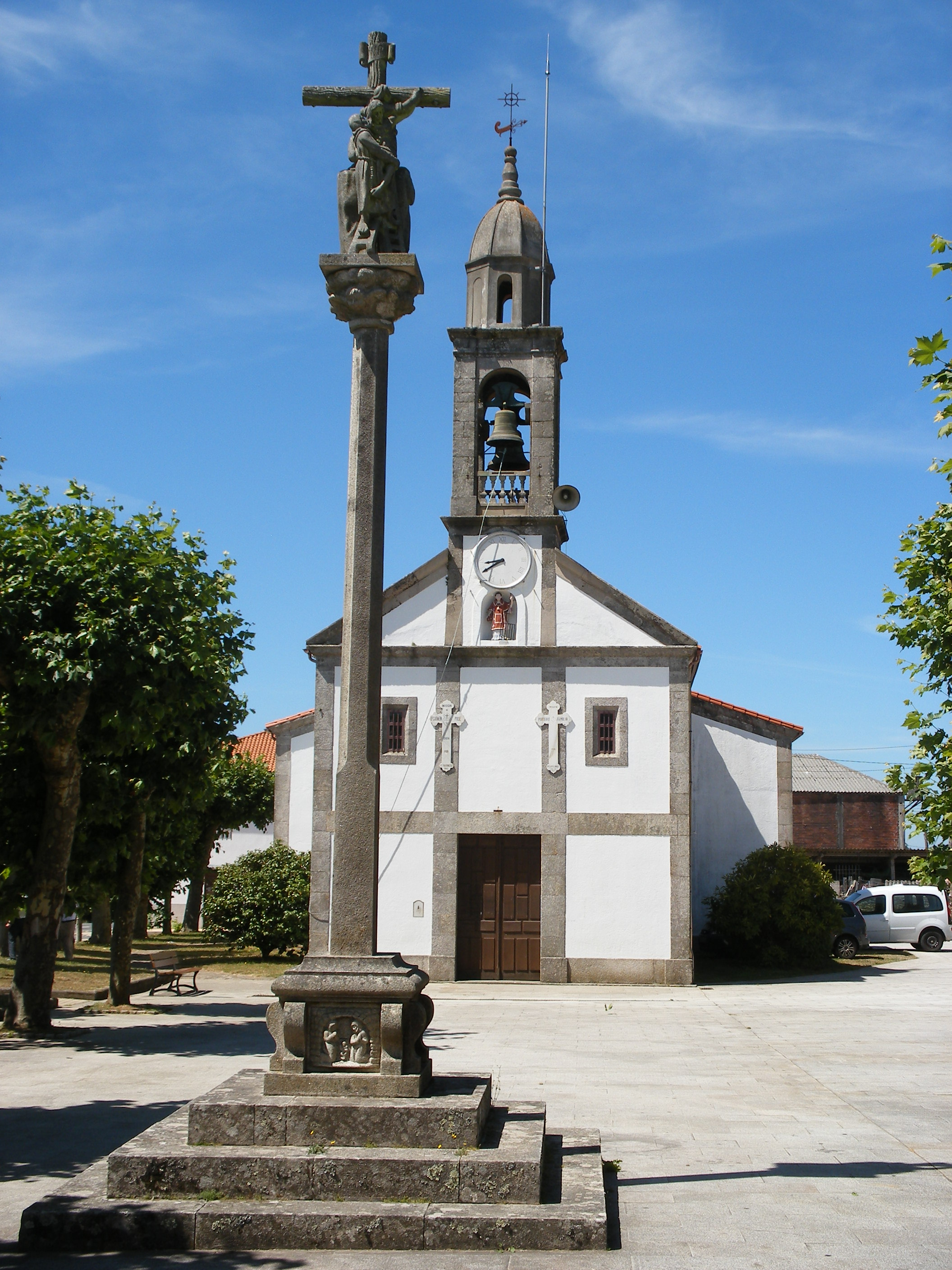

- Location within Spain
- Coordinates: 43°10′44.70″N 08°45′52.80″W
- Country: Spain
- Autonomous community: Galicia
- Province: A Coruña
- Municipality: Coristanco

Population
  - Total: 647

A Agualada is a parish in the Spanish municipality of Coristanco, Galicia.
