= Trasmiras =

- municipality
- Coat of arms

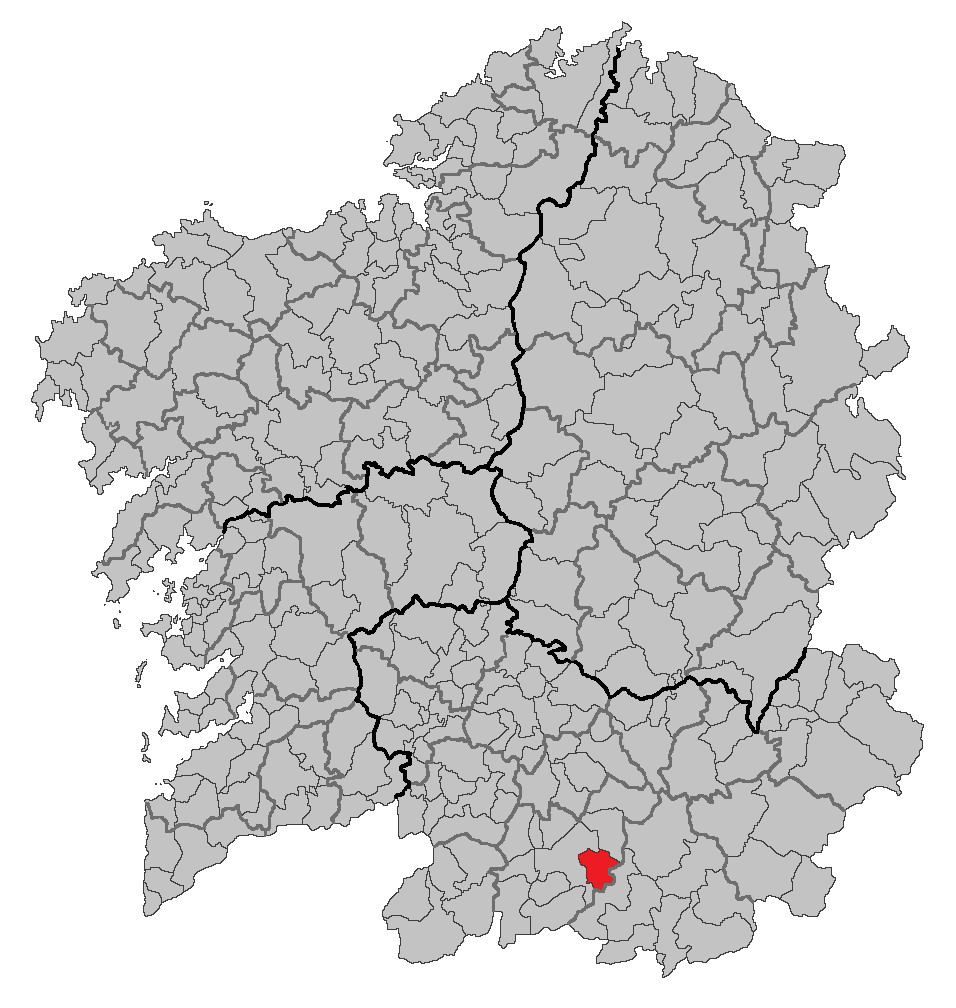
- Location in Galicia

- Location in Spain
- Coordinates: 42°01′22″N 7°37′00″W
- Country: Spain
- Autonomous community: Galicia
- Province: Ourense
- Comarca: A Limia

Government
  - Mayor: Emilio José Pazos Ojea (PPdeG)

Area
  - Total: 56.7 km^{2} (21.9 sq mi)
- Elevation: 654 m (2,146 ft)

Population (2025-01-01)
  - Total: 1,216
  - Density: 21.4/km^{2} (55.5/sq mi)
- Time zone: UTC+1 (CET)
  - Summer (DST): UTC+2 (CEST)

Trasmiras is a municipality in the province of Ourense, in the autonomous community of Galicia, Spain. It belongs to the comarca of A Limia.
