= Silvio Meira =

Brazilian computer scientist

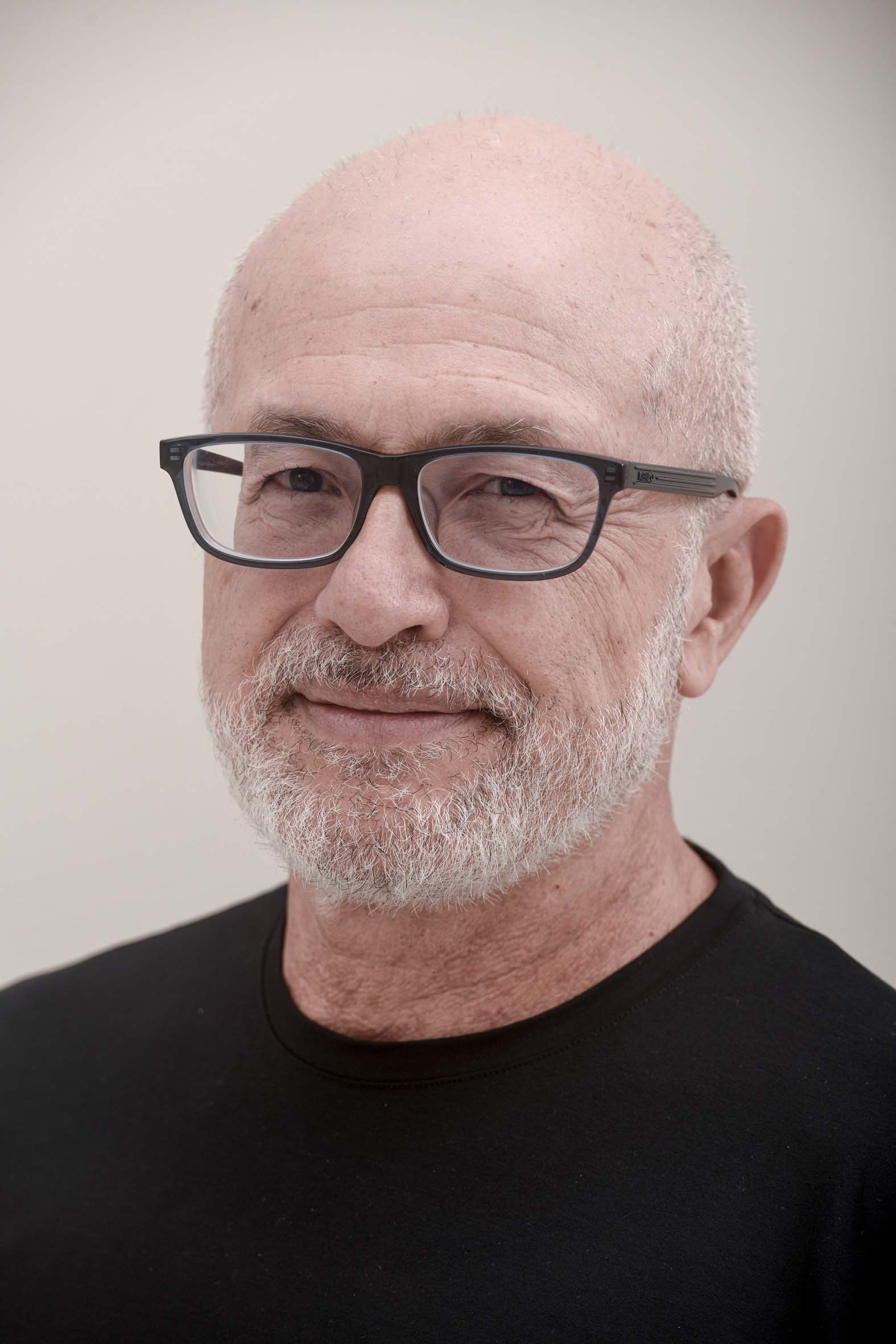
Sílvio Romero de Lemos Meira (Photo by Leo Caldas)

Silvio Romero de Lemos Meira (Taperoá, Paraíba, 2 February 1955) is a Brazilian computer scientist, professor and entrepreneur in the area of software engineering and innovation. Currently, he is an emeritus professor at the Centre of Informatics of the Federal University of Pernambuco. Additionally, he also is the chairman of the Porto Digital - the biggest Brazilian tech park - and is member of the board of directors in several companies. Meira is also founder and chief scientist at tds.company.

He is co-founder of the Recife Center for Advanced Studies and Systems, where he served as chief scientist for 12 years.
