= Vilar de Santos =

- municipality
- Coat of arms

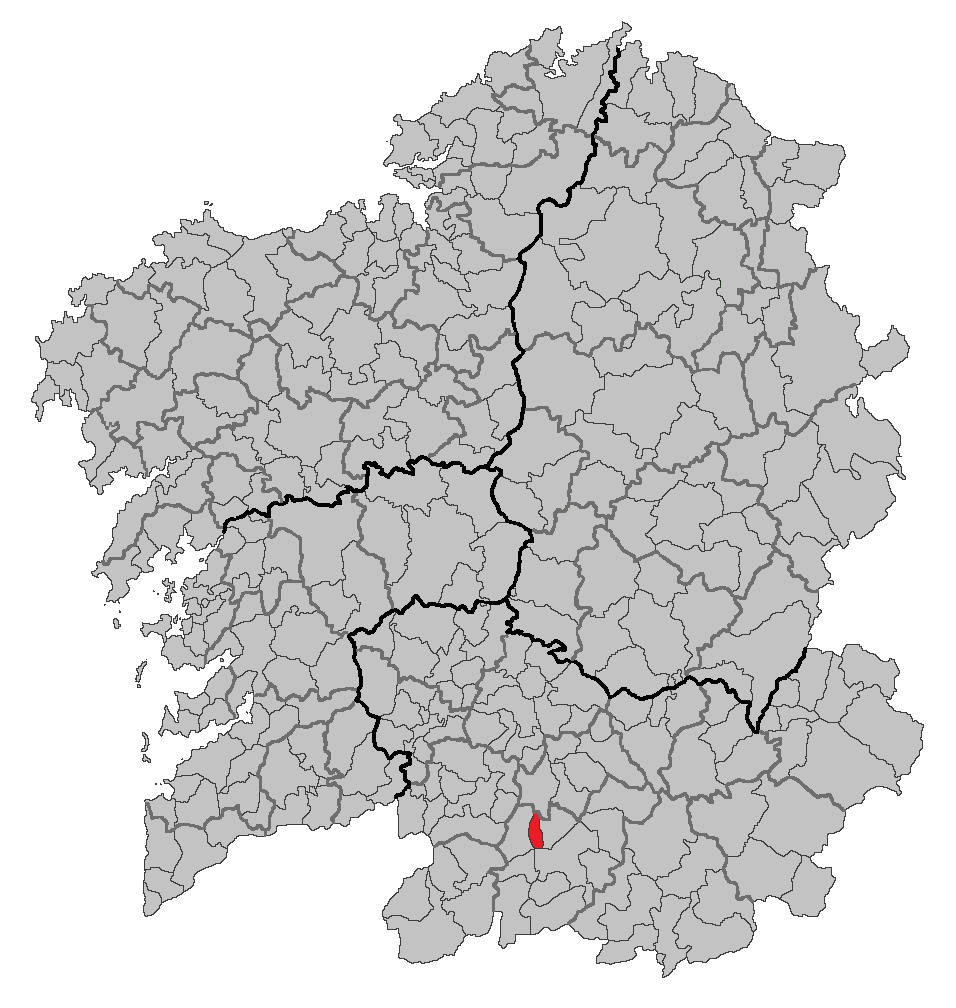
- Location in Galicia

- Location in Spain
- Coordinates: 42°05′08″N 7°47′48″W
- Country: Spain
- Autonomous community: Galicia
- Province: Ourense
- Comarca: A Limia

Government
  - Mayor: Xoan Xosé Jardón Pedras (Galician Nationalist Bloc)

Area
  - Total: 20.7 km^{2} (8.0 sq mi)
- Elevation: 632 m (2,073 ft)

Population (2025-01-01)
  - Total: 784
  - Density: 37.9/km^{2} (98.1/sq mi)
- Time zone: UTC+1 (CET)
  - Summer (DST): UTC+2 (CEST)
- Website: www.vilardesantos.com

Vilar de Santos is a small municipality in the province of Ourense, in the autonomous community of Galicia, Spain. It belongs to the comarca of A Limia.
