= Riotorto =

Town in Lugo, Spain

Coordinates: 43°21′35″N 7°15′16″W

- Municipality
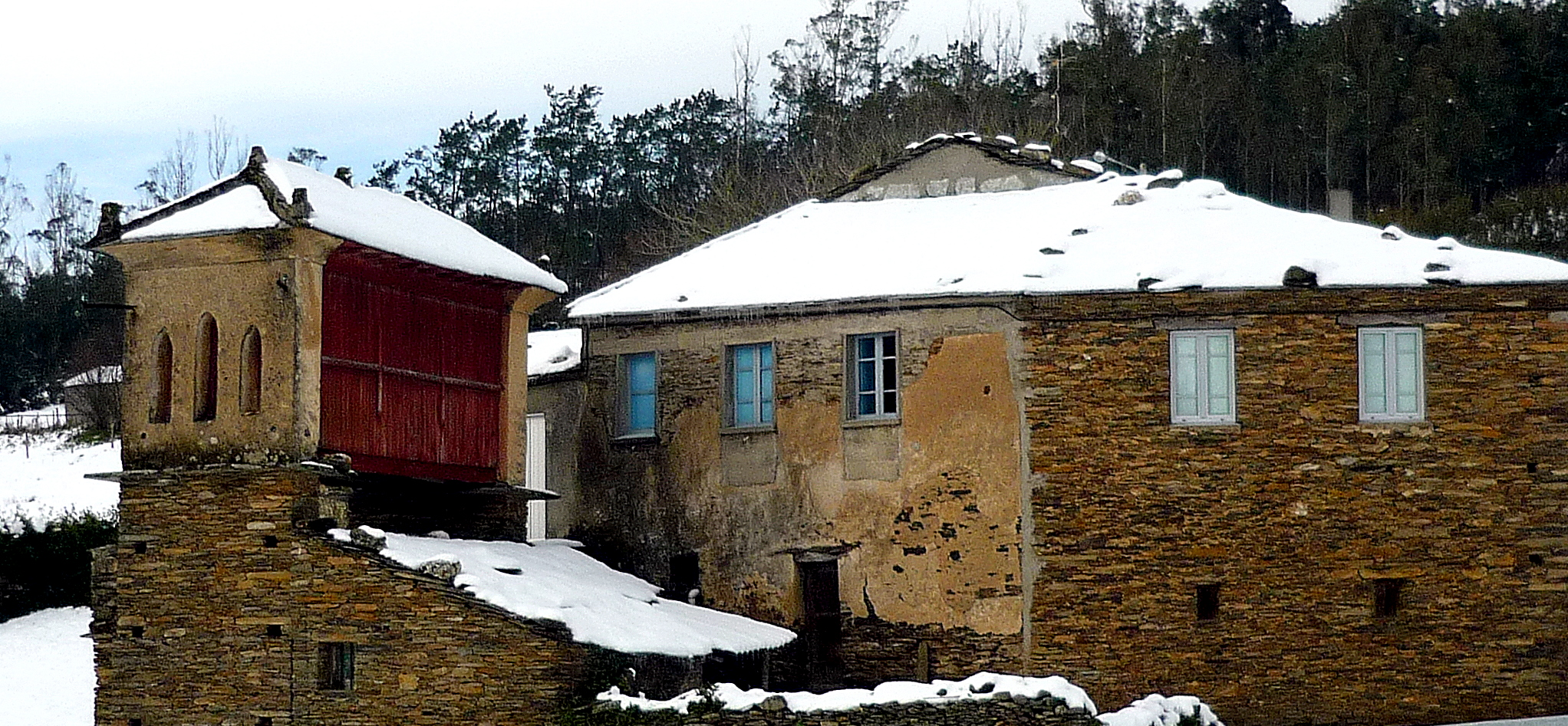
- Town view with an hórreo and a house.

- Coat of arms

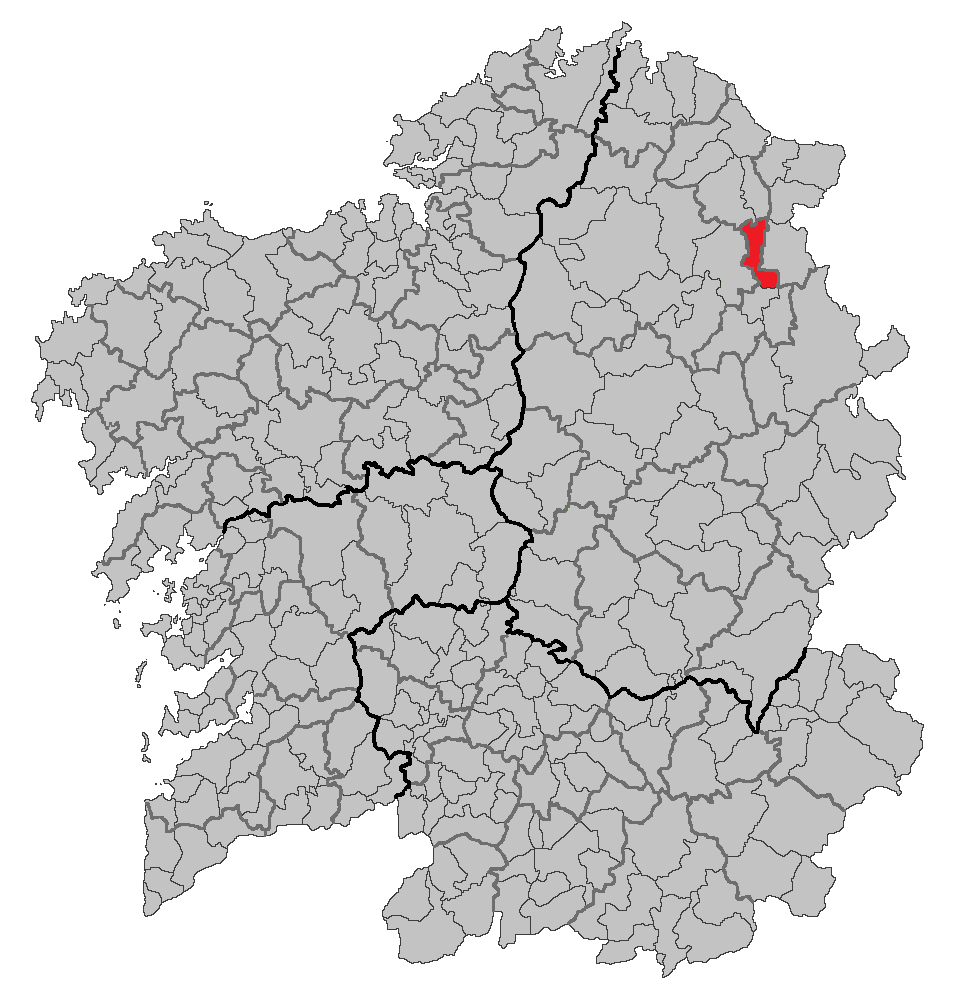
- Location of Riotorto

- Location in Spain
- Country: Spain
- Autonomous community: Galicia
- Province: Lugo
- Comarca: Meira

Government
  - Alcalde: Clemente Iglesias González (PPdeG)

Area
  - Total: 66.33 km^{2} (25.61 sq mi)

Population (2023)
  - Total: 1,200
  - Density: 18/km^{2} (47/sq mi)
- Demonym(s): Riotortego, riotortense
- Time zone: UTC+1 (CET)
  - Summer (DST): UTC+2 (CEST)
- Postal code: 27744
- Website: Official website

Riotorto is a municipality in the province of Lugo, in the autonomous community of Galicia, Spain. It belongs to the comarca of Meira.

== Civil parishes ==
- Aldurfe (San Pedro)
- Espasande de Baixo (Santa María)
- Ferreiravella (San Xillao)
- Galegos (Santa María)
- A Muxueira (San Lourenzo)
- A Órrea (Santa Comba)
- Riotorto (San Pedro)
- Santa Marta de Meilán (Santa Marta)
