= Xunqueira de Ambía =

- Municipality
- Coat of arms

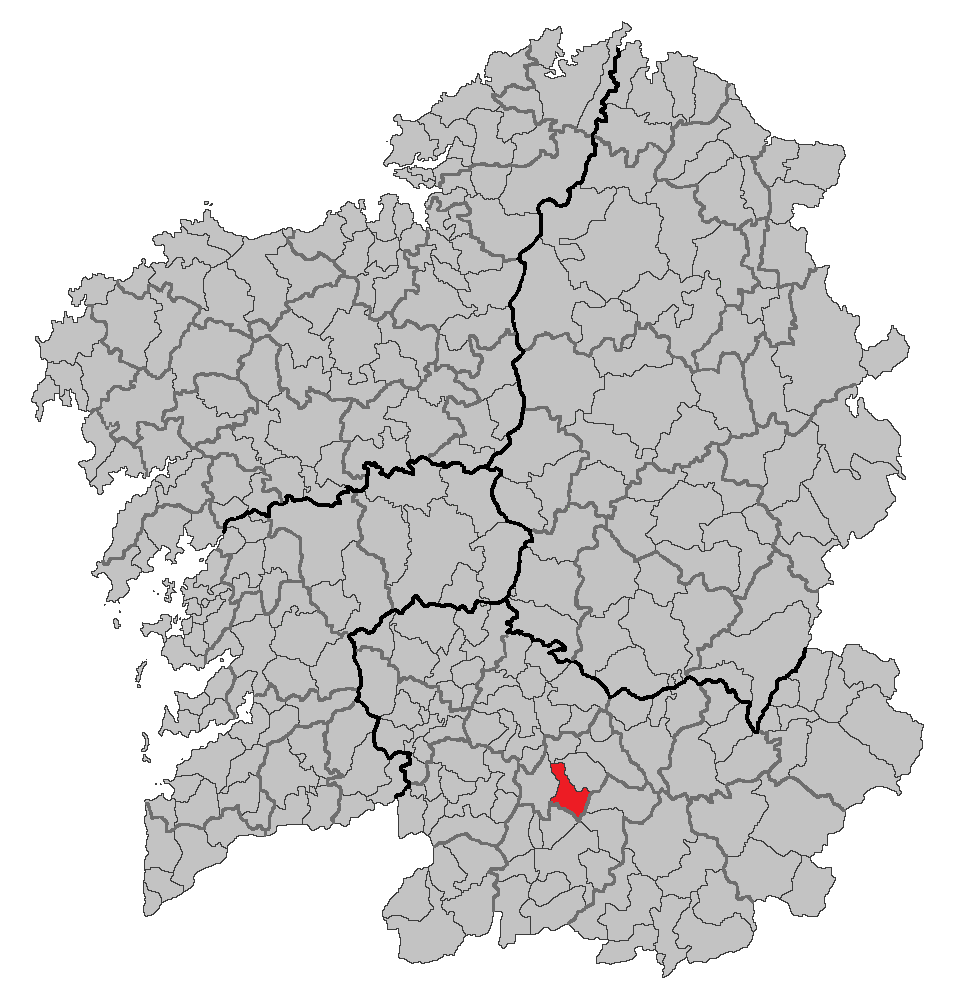
- Location in Galicia

- Location in Spain
- Coordinates: 42°12′20″N 7°44′08″W
- Country: Spain
- Autonomous community: Galicia
- Province: Ourense
- Comarca: Allariz – Maceda

Government
  - Mayor: José Luis Gavilanes Losada (People's Party)

Area
  - Total: 60.2 km^{2} (23.2 sq mi)
- Elevation: 540 m (1,770 ft)

Population (2025-01-01)
  - Total: 1,346
  - Density: 22.4/km^{2} (57.9/sq mi)
- Time zone: UTC+1 (CET)
  - Summer (DST): UTC+2 (CEST)

Xunqueira de Ambía is a municipality in the centre of the province of Ourense, in the autonomous community of Galicia, Spain. It belongs to the comarca of Allariz – Maceda.
