= Porqueira =

- municipality
- Coat of arms

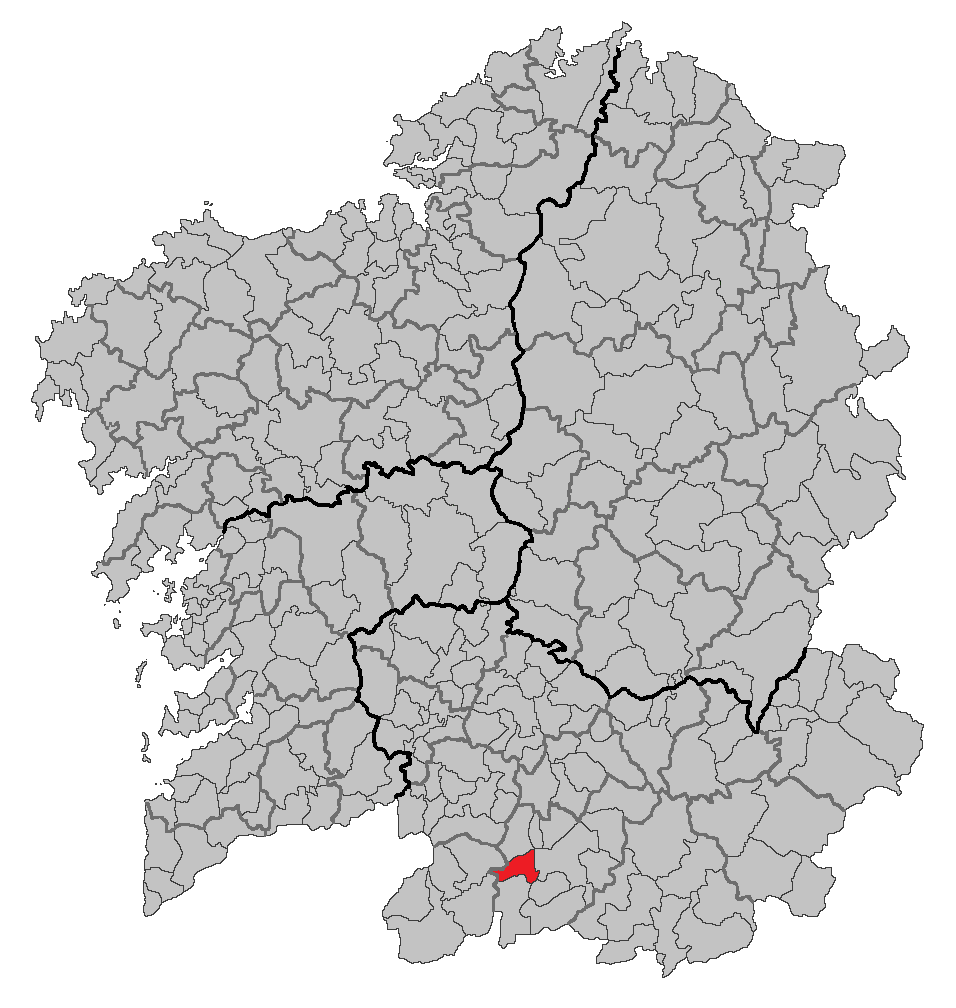
- Location in Galicia

- Location in Spain
- Coordinates: 42°01′04″N 7°50′40″W
- Country: Spain
- Autonomous community: Galicia
- Province: Ourense
- Comarca: A Limia

Government
  - Mayor: Susana Vázquez Dorado (People's Party)

Area
  - Total: 43.4 km^{2} (16.8 sq mi)
- Elevation: 632 m (2,073 ft)

Population (2025-01-01)
  - Total: 806
  - Density: 18.6/km^{2} (48.1/sq mi)
- Time zone: UTC+1 (CET)
  - Summer (DST): UTC+2 (CEST)

Porqueira is a municipality in the province of Ourense, in the autonomous community of Galicia, Spain. It belongs to the comarca of A Limia.
