= Xinzo de Limia =

- Town and municipality
- Flag Coat of arms
- Nickname: Xinzo
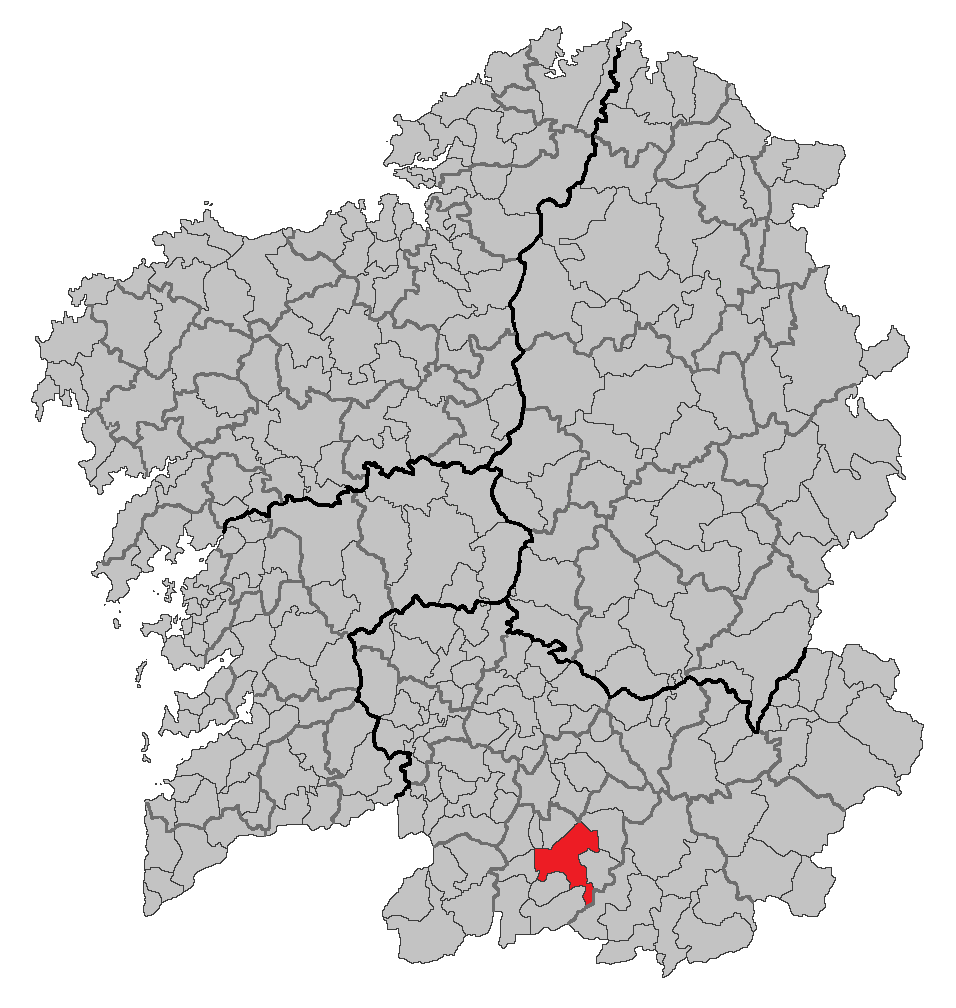
- Situation of Xinzo de Limia within Galicia

- Location in Spain
- Coordinates: 42°03′39″N 7°43′24″W
- Country: Spain
- Autonomous community: Galicia
- Province: Ourense
- Comarca: A Limia

Government
  - Alcalde (Mayor): Elvira Lama (PSOE)

Population (2025-01-01)
  - Total: 9,699
- Time zone: UTC+1 (CET)
  - Summer (DST): UTC+2 (CET)
- Website: www.xinzodelimia.es

Xinzo de Limia is a town and municipality in the province of Ourense, in the autonomous community of Galicia, Spain. It belongs to the comarca of A Limia. It lies on the important Autovia das Rias Baixas in the fertile valley of Antela, approximately 33 km from Verín and 43 km from Ourense. The Límia (Lima in Portuguese) river passes through the town on its way south towards the Portuguese border.

Xinzo is a town of services and an important stopping point on the main Vigo-Madrid highway. There are several small industries, including a glass factory, and many pig, cow and dairy farms in the surrounding area. The drained lakebed of Antela, once Spain's largest freshwater lake until the 1950s, produces cereals, hay, and especially potatoes. Xinzo is in fact one of Spain's largest producers of potatoes.

There is a legend connected to Xinzo. Several classical authors of antiquity reproduce the myth of the loss of memory connected to crossing the Límia River, referred by them as Lethes or Oblivionis (compare the river Lethe of Greek mythology). In 138 BC the Roman chieftain Decimus Junius Brutus put an end to the myth told by the Galicians when, on crossing the river, he began to call each one of his legionnaires by their names from the opposite bank. That historical fact has been now represented in an historical party called Festa do Esquecemento. Seeing the Límia today it is difficult to imagine this tiny river provoking such a fear.

Xinzo has few monuments but is famous for hosting one of Galicia's most typical carnivals. The characteristic figure is the pantalla, which symbolizes the devil. The pantalla is the guardian of the carnival, and runs through the streets in groups of two or three with two swollen pig bladders in the hands making huge noise. If the pantallas finds a male relative or neighbour of Xinzo de Limia not dressed with carnival clothes, they will take him into a bar, to pay the fee for not been dressed properly, which is a glass of wine.

== Demography ==
From:INE Archiv

== Notable people ==
- Carmen Agulló Díaz (born 1957), tenured professor, non-fiction author
