= Meira =

Coordinates: 43°13′00″N 7°16′59″W

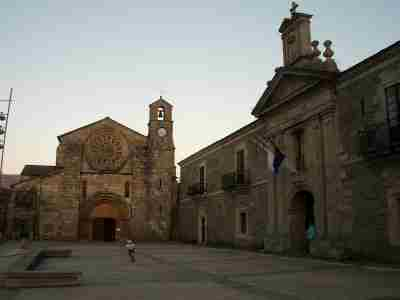

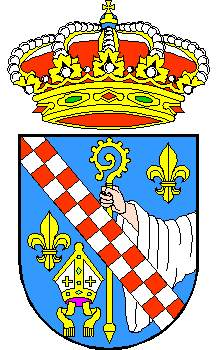
Meira's coat of arms

Meira is a municipality in the Galician province of Lugo. It is in the northwest of the province, including the Terra Chá and the Serras Orientais to the west of the Serra de Meira. The most popular festivals are those of the candles, carnival, corpus, Santa Maria (15 August), San Roque, and the Festa da Malha. Every two weeks, the "Feira de Meira"(literally translating to the fair of Meira) is held, where many people sell their food, cattle, and several other things. In the monastery of Santa María, there are six confessionals. The river Minho, the longest lake in Galicia, was born in a glacier in Meira. As of 2025, the village had a population of 1,773.

== Parishes ==
- Meira (Santa María)
- Seixosmil (Santo Isidro)
