= Veloso Salgado =

Spanish-born Portuguese painter (1864–1945)

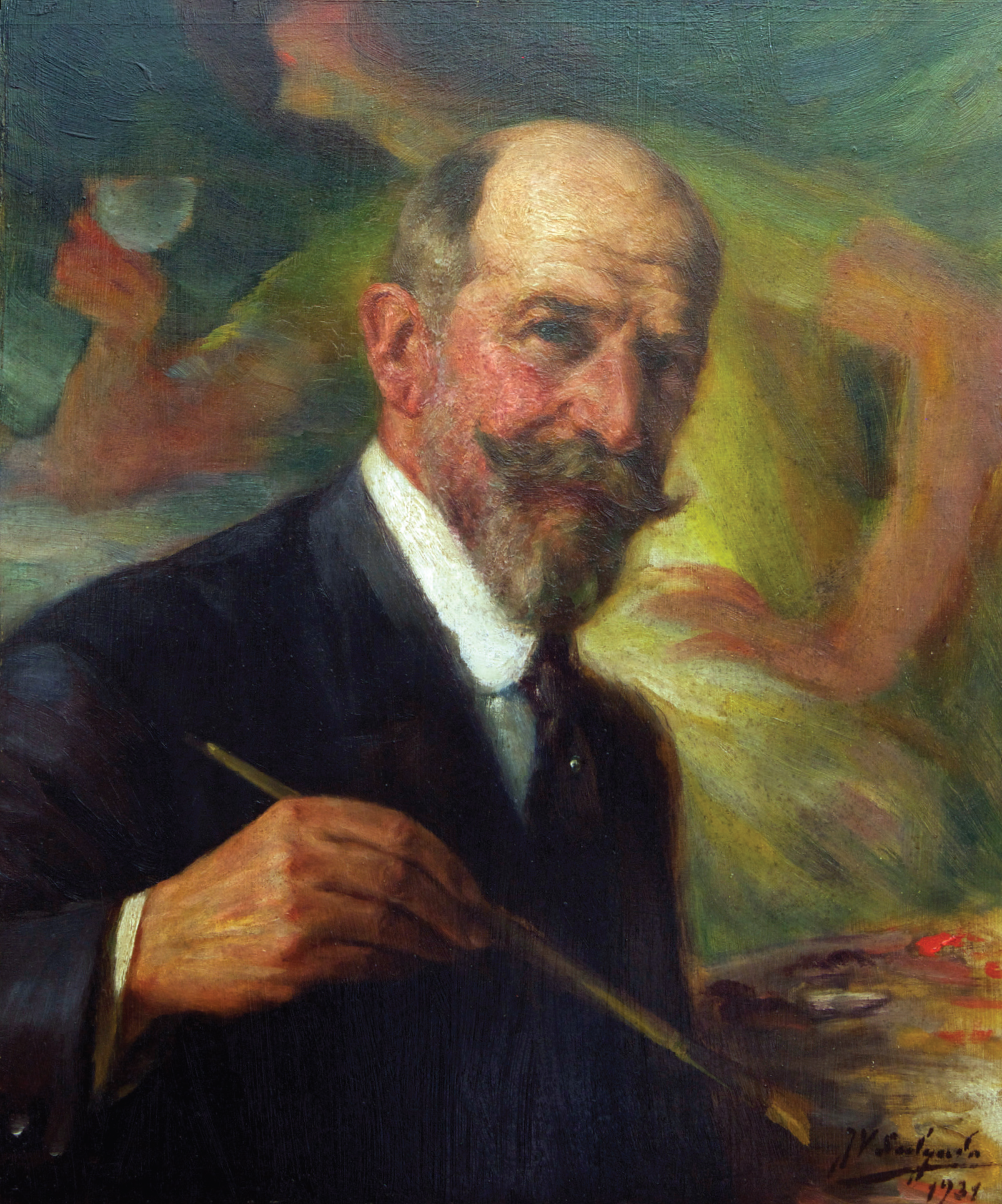
- Self-portrait, National Academy of Fine Arts, Lisbon (1931)
- Born: 2 April 1864; Melón, Ourense, Galicia, Spain
- Died: 22 July 1945 (aged 81); Lisbon, Portugal
- Resting place: Prazeres Cemetery, Lisbon
- Spouse: Vitorina de Silva Mello (m. 1896)

José Maria Veloso Salgado (2 April 1864 – 22 July 1945) was a Spanish-born Portuguese painter. He is regarded as one of the country's foremost masters of Naturalism with many distinguished works in historical painting, landscapes and portraits.

== Biography ==
José Maria Veloso Salgado was born in Galicia (Spain), in Melón (a small town in the province of Ourense, not far from the Portuguese border), where he lived until the age of 10. He was the son of two farmers, José Pérez and Dolores Veloso Rodrigues Salgado. In 1874, his parents sent him to live with his maternal uncle, Miguel Veloso Rodrigues Salgado, who ran a lithography workshop (Litografia Lemos) in Lisbon, Portugal. Veloso Salgado started working as an apprentice at his uncle's workshop.

From 1878 to 1880, he attended evening classes for workers at the School of the Lisbon School of Fine Arts, and was approved with distinction. Encouraged by his results, he started attending normal evening classes in 1881 and, in the end of his first year, he won an award of 20-thousand réis. He then started daytime classes, where he studied under José Simões de Almeida and José Ferreira Chaves who taught Drawing and Painting, respectively; he achieved top marks in both classes.

In 1884, he had presented two works on the 13th exhibition of the Society for the Promotion of Fine Arts (Sociedade Promotora de Belas Artes), achieving an honorable mention, and, in 1887, he also participated on the 14th exhibition. In 1887, Veloso Salgado finished his studies with a final grade of 17 out of 20; that same year, he became a naturalized Portuguese citizen. All these achievements allowed him to get a state scholarship to pursue further studies in Paris.

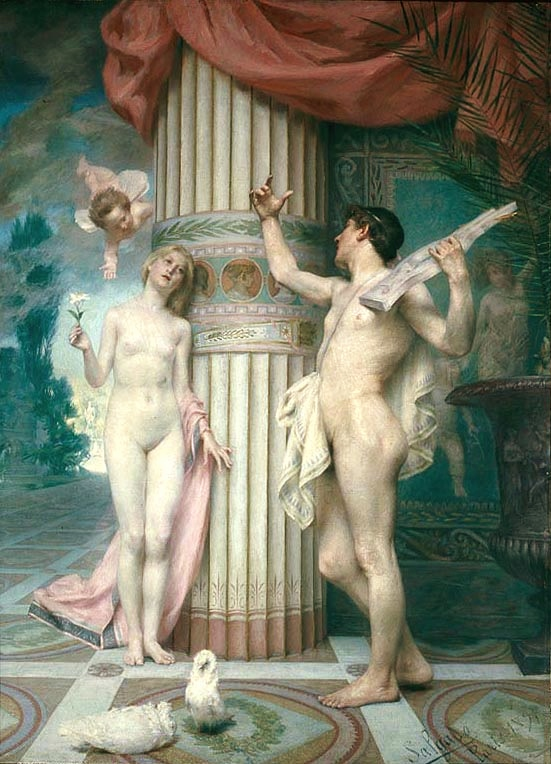
Amor and Psyche (1891), National Museum of Contemporary Art

In 1888, Veloso Salgado rented an atelier in Paris (in Rue Denfert-Rochereau), which he shared with Artur Melo. It was also here that he befriended sculptor António Teixeira Lopes, who had a studio on the same building. Veloso Salgado was accepted to the École des Beaux-Arts, studying there under Alexandre Cabanel, Benjamin-Constant, Jules-Élie Delaunay, Jean-Paul Laurens, and Fernand Cormon. Around this time, he contacted with painter Jules Breton and his daughter and apprentice Virginie Demont-Breton, as well as her husband, Adrien Demont, who became a close friend of Veloso Salgado's.

He debuted at the Salon in 1889. He won a third prize medal at the Salon with his Amor and Psyche (1891), the first of his important works, currently at the National Museum of Contemporary Art, in Lisbon. Meanwhile, he also won a painting contest hosted by the Lisbon City Hall (1890), and he participated in the 1st Exhibition of the Artistic Guild of Lisbon (Grémio Artístico de Lisboa). After his stay in Paris, Veloso Salgado journeyed to Italy before returning to Lisbon, stopping in Florence, where he studied the primitive painters, made copies of Renaissance works, and painted en plein air. While in Italy, he made one of his most celebrated works, Jesus — which was considered hors-concours in the 1892 Salon (this painting was lost in 1900 when the ship bringing it back from the Exposition Universelle sank). In the 1890s, he also participated in the Munich Art Exhibition, and in the Exposition Internationale d'Anvers. The Lisbon Academy of Fine Arts made him an "Academician of Merit".

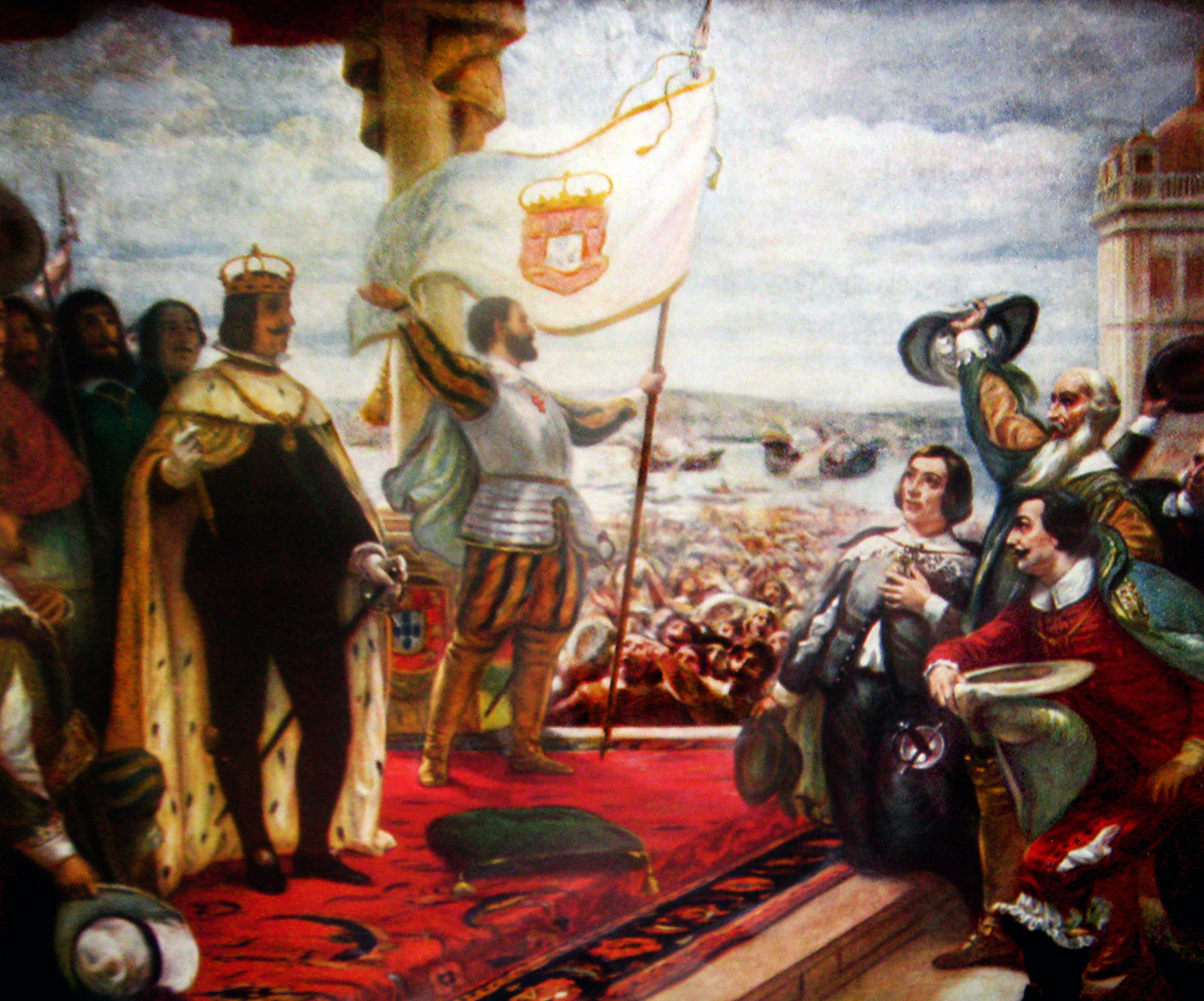
The Acclamation of King John IV (1908), wall painting at the Lisbon Military Museum

He returned to Lisbon in 1895 and, in December of that year, was made interim professor of History Painting in the School of Fine Arts; two years later he was chosen over Columbano to the post of permanent professor. From this point on, he regularly participated in big artistic exhibition, both national and international, he was commissioned painting by distinguished personalities and institutions, and accumulated awards and distinctions (Officer of the Order of Saint James of the Sword in 1896, Knight of the French Legion of Honour in 1902, member of the Lisbon Academy of Sciences in 1907). Apart from easel painting, he was also very frequently commissioned to decorate several public buildings and private residences: the Tribunal Room of the Stock Exchange Palace in Porto, the Chamber of Deputies in the Palace of Saint Benedict in Lisbon, the Lisbon Military Museum, the Lisbon Medical School, the Faculty of Sciences of the University of Porto. Alongside architect Miguel Ventura Terra, he also worked on the decoration of Politeama Theatre, in Lisbon, and the Lisbon Synagogue.

In 1901, following an artistic education reform, he started teaching History Painting alongside Columbano.

In 1896, he married Vitorina de Silva Mello, goddaughter and protégée of painter José Ferreira Chaves. The marriage produced two offspring: José Miguel Veloso Salgado (born 1896), and Maria Adelina Veloso Salgado (born 1899). When Ferreira Chaves's widow died in 1903, Veloso Salgado inherited most of her assets.

Veloso Salgado retired from painting in 1940, at age 76, and died five years later, in 1945.

== Gallery ==
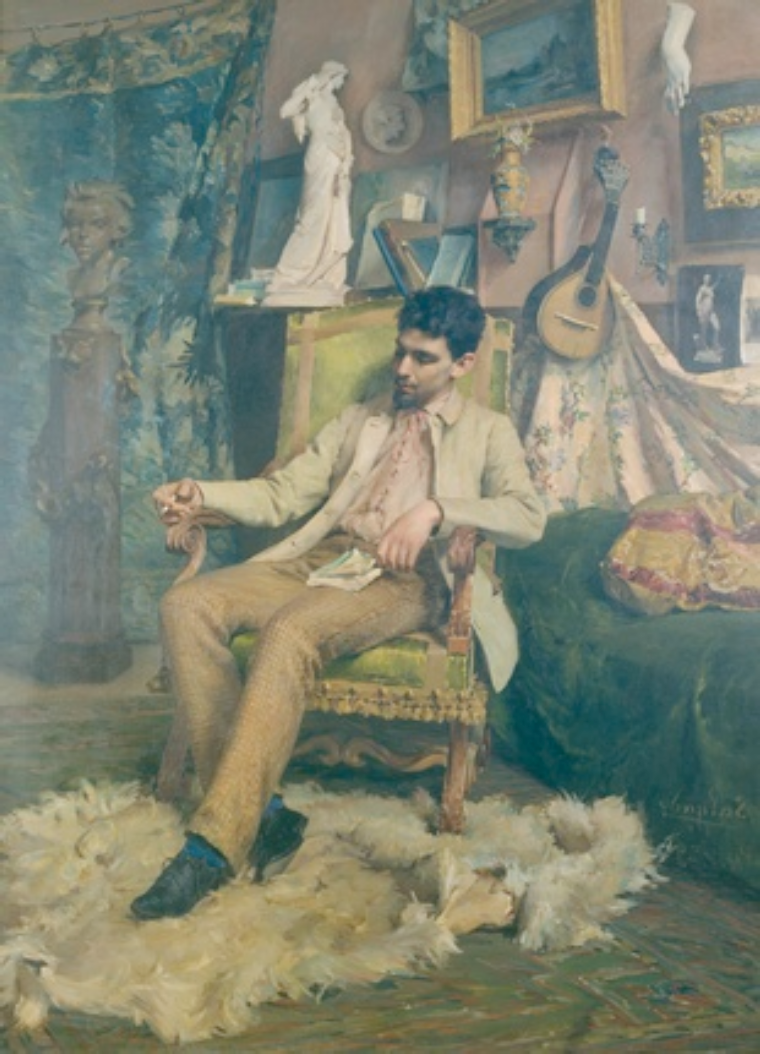
Portrait of sculptor Teixeira Lopes in his atelier in Paris (1889), Casa-Museu Teixeira Lopes

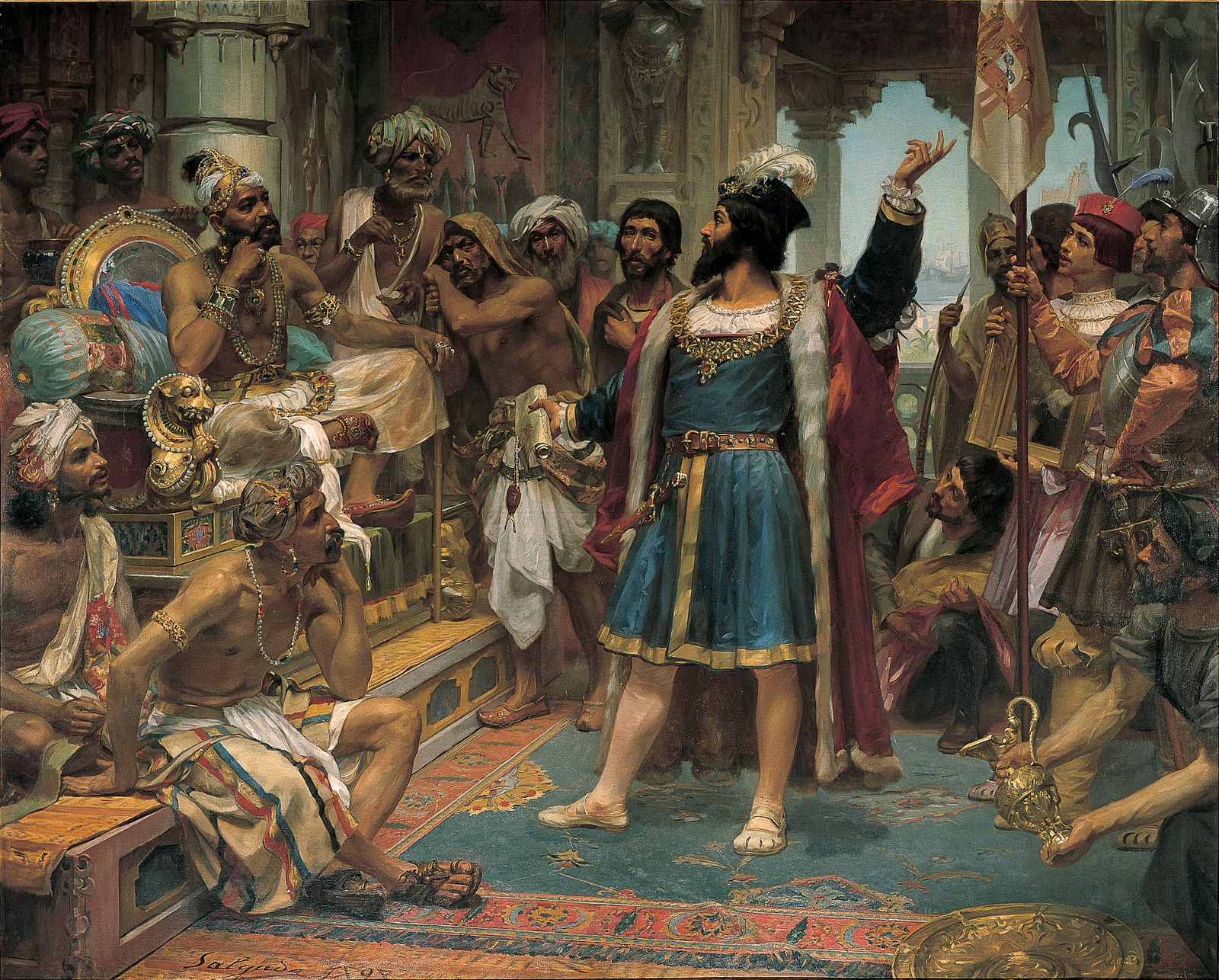
Vasco da Gama before the Zamorin of Calicut (1898), Lisbon Geographic Society

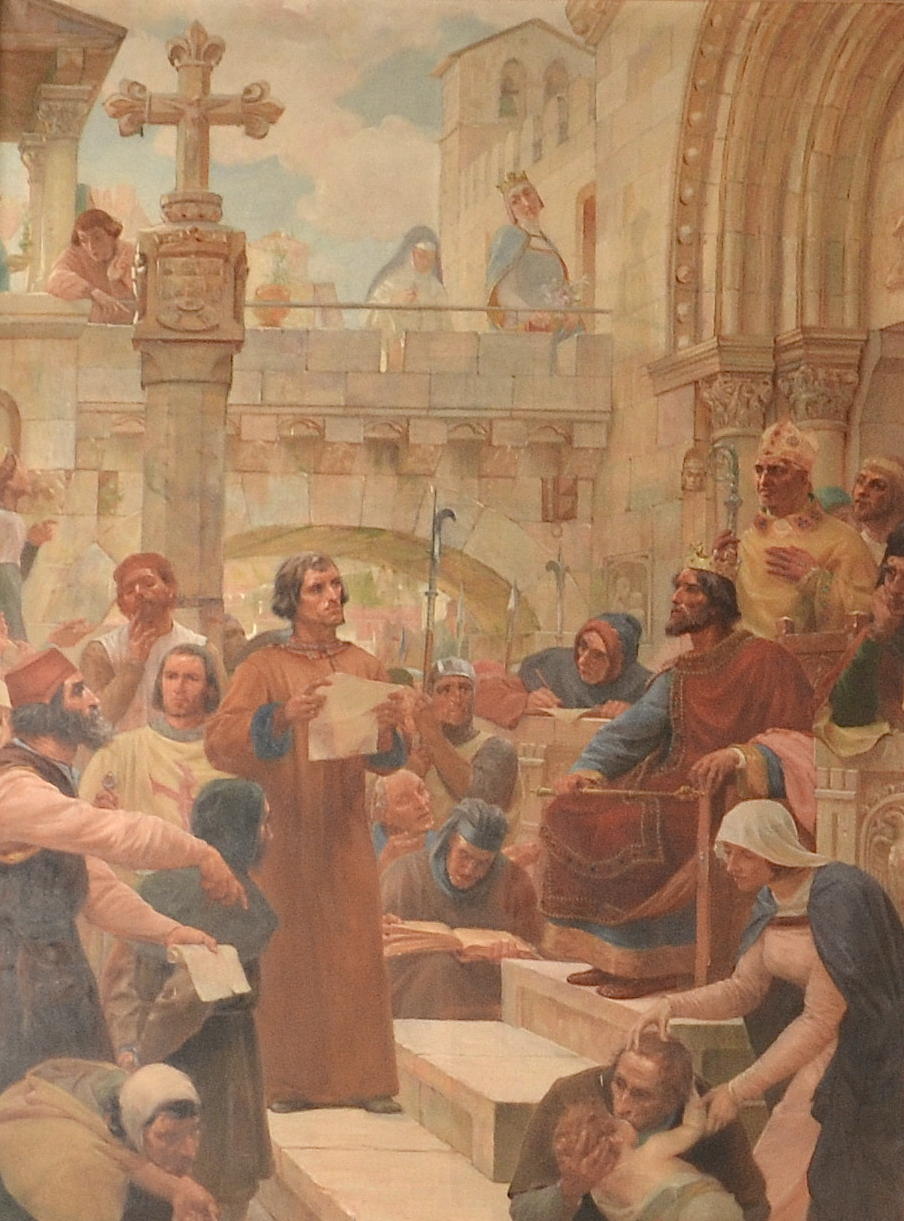
King Denis of Portugal Administers Justice (1899), Stock Exchange Palace

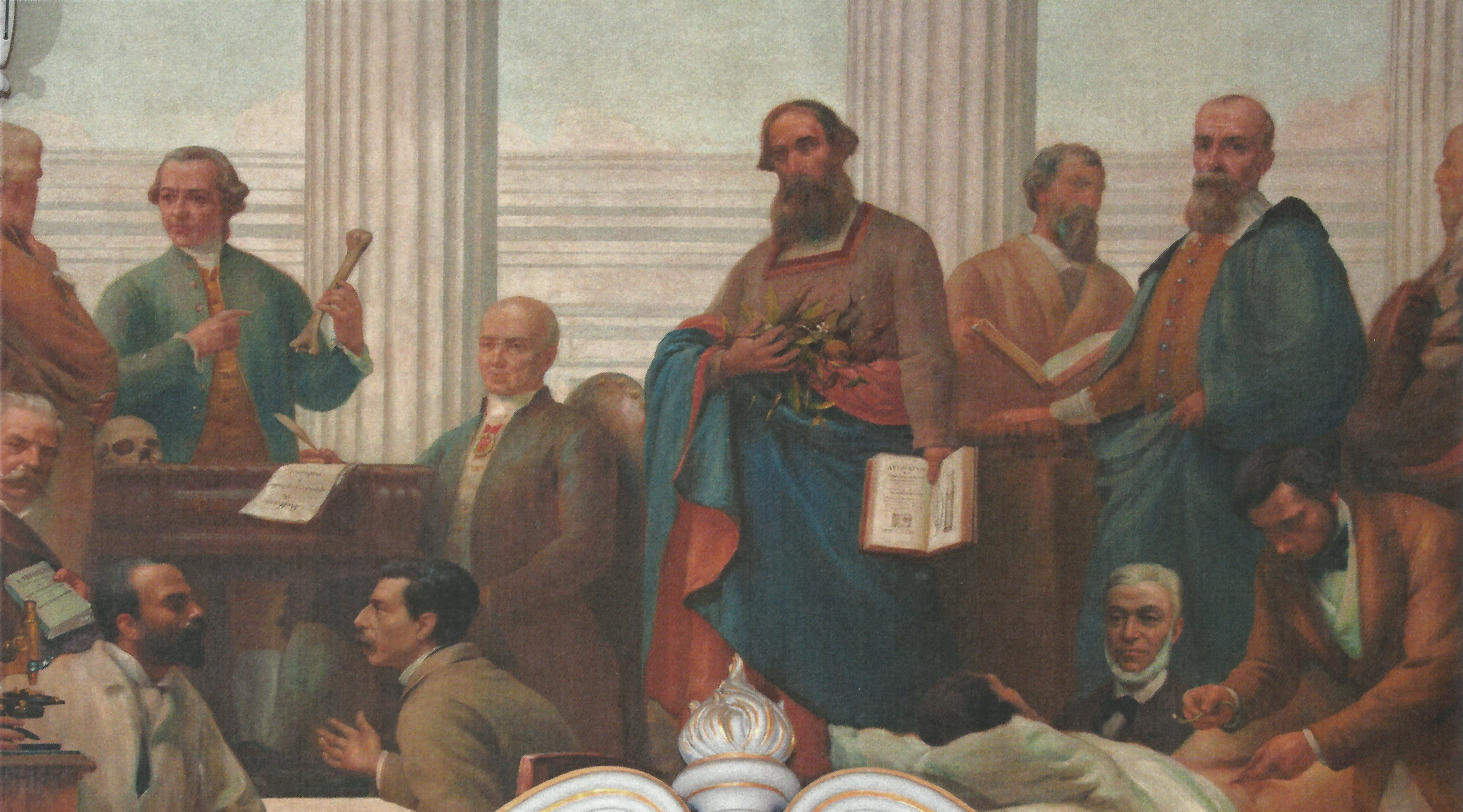
Portuguese Medicine (1906), NOVA Medical School

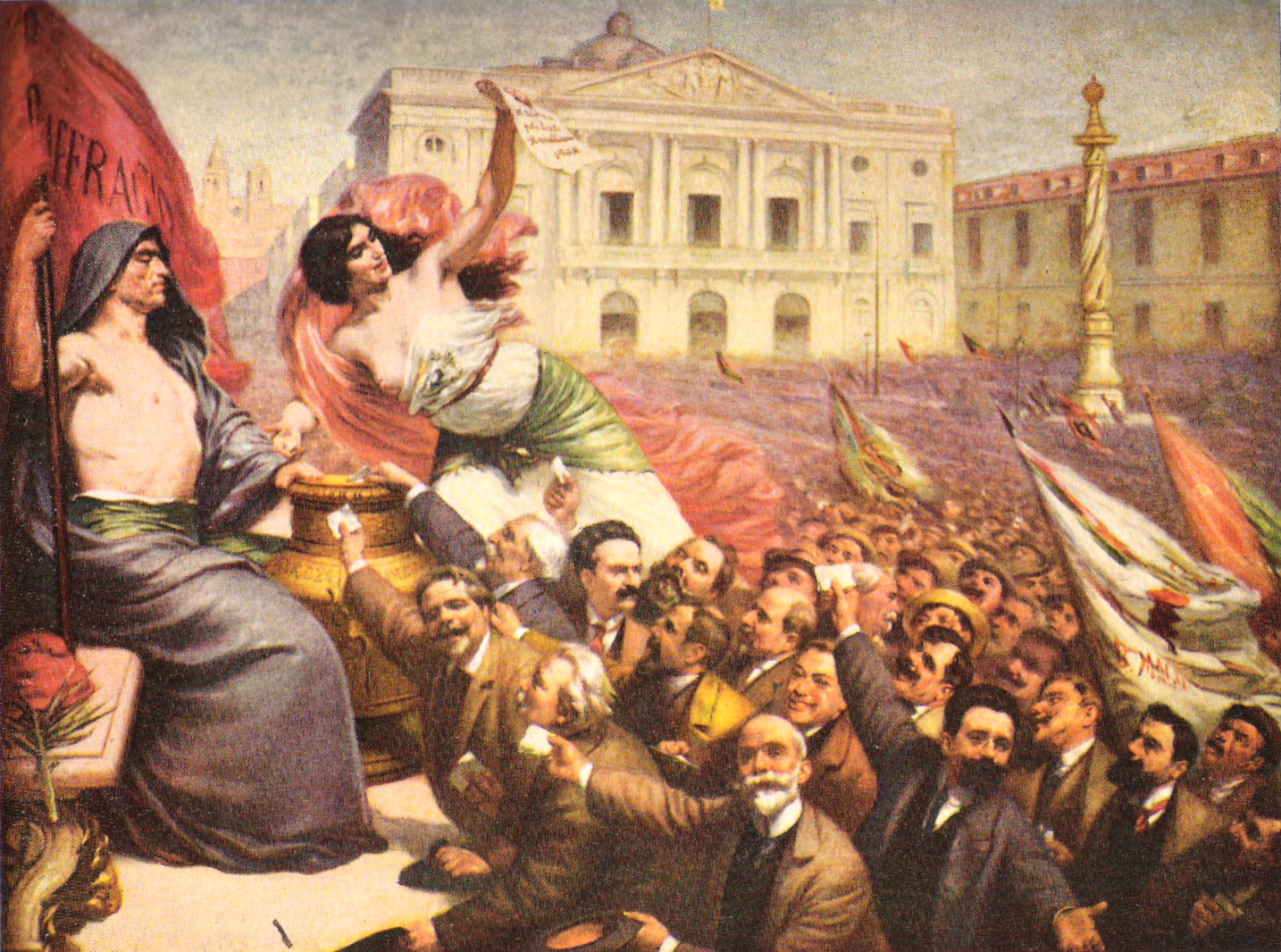
The Suffrage (1913), Pimenta Palace

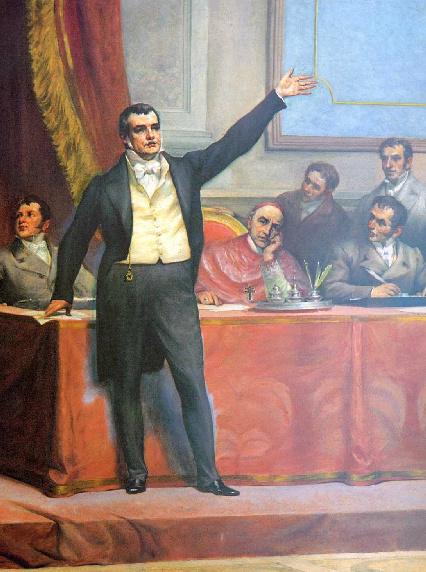
Detail of The Constituent Courts of 1821 (1921), Portuguese Parliament

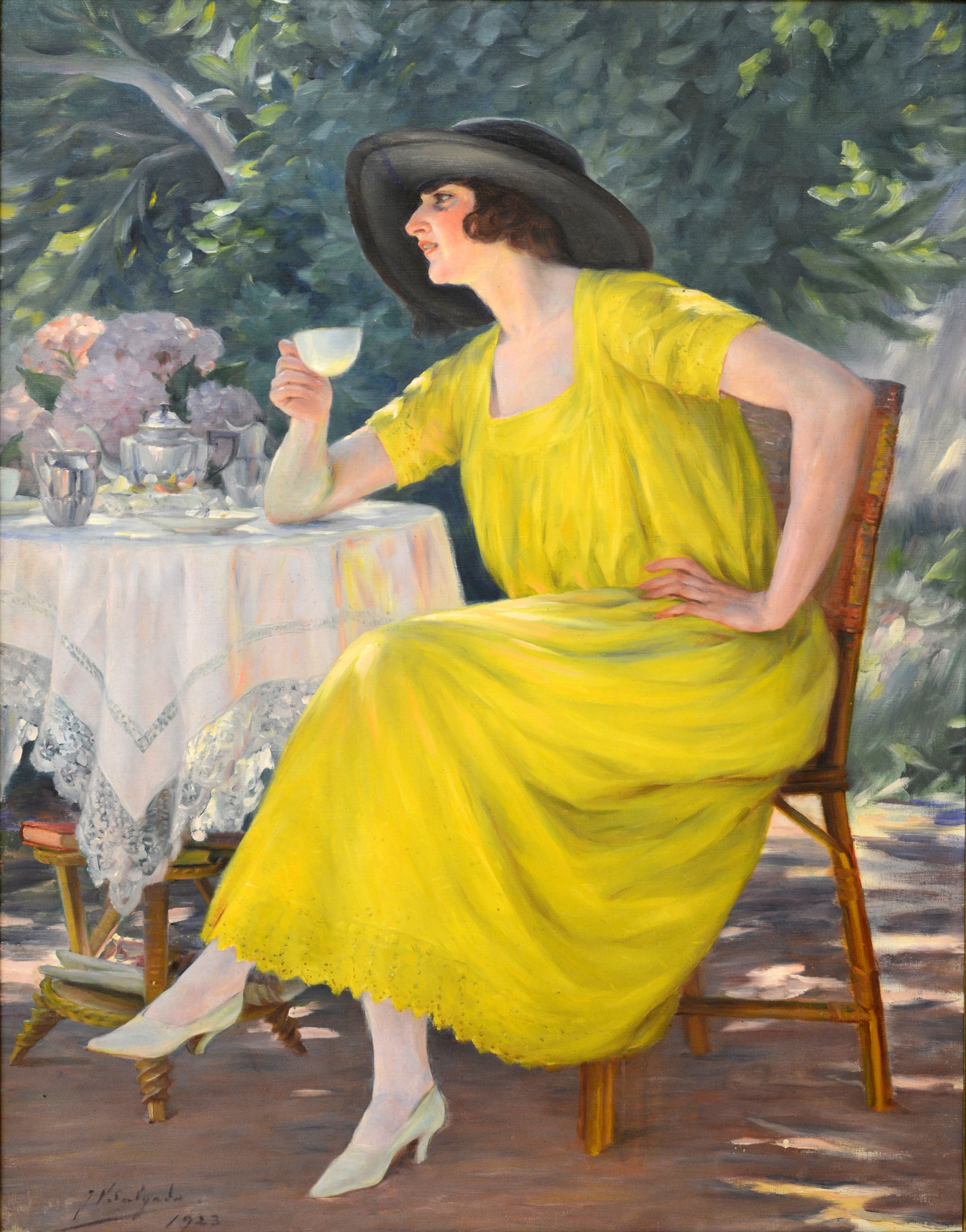
Youth (1923), José Malhoa Museum

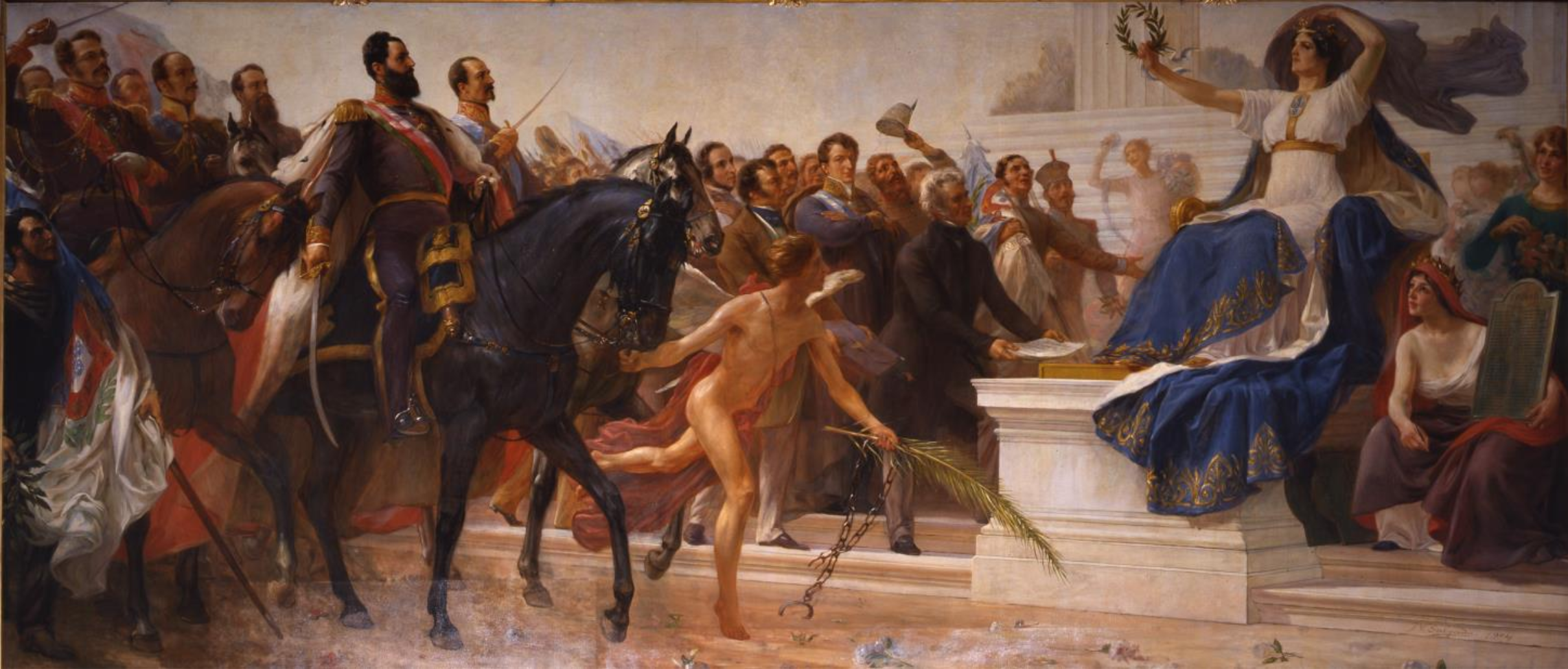
The Motherland Crowning its Heroes (1904), Military Museum of Lisbon.

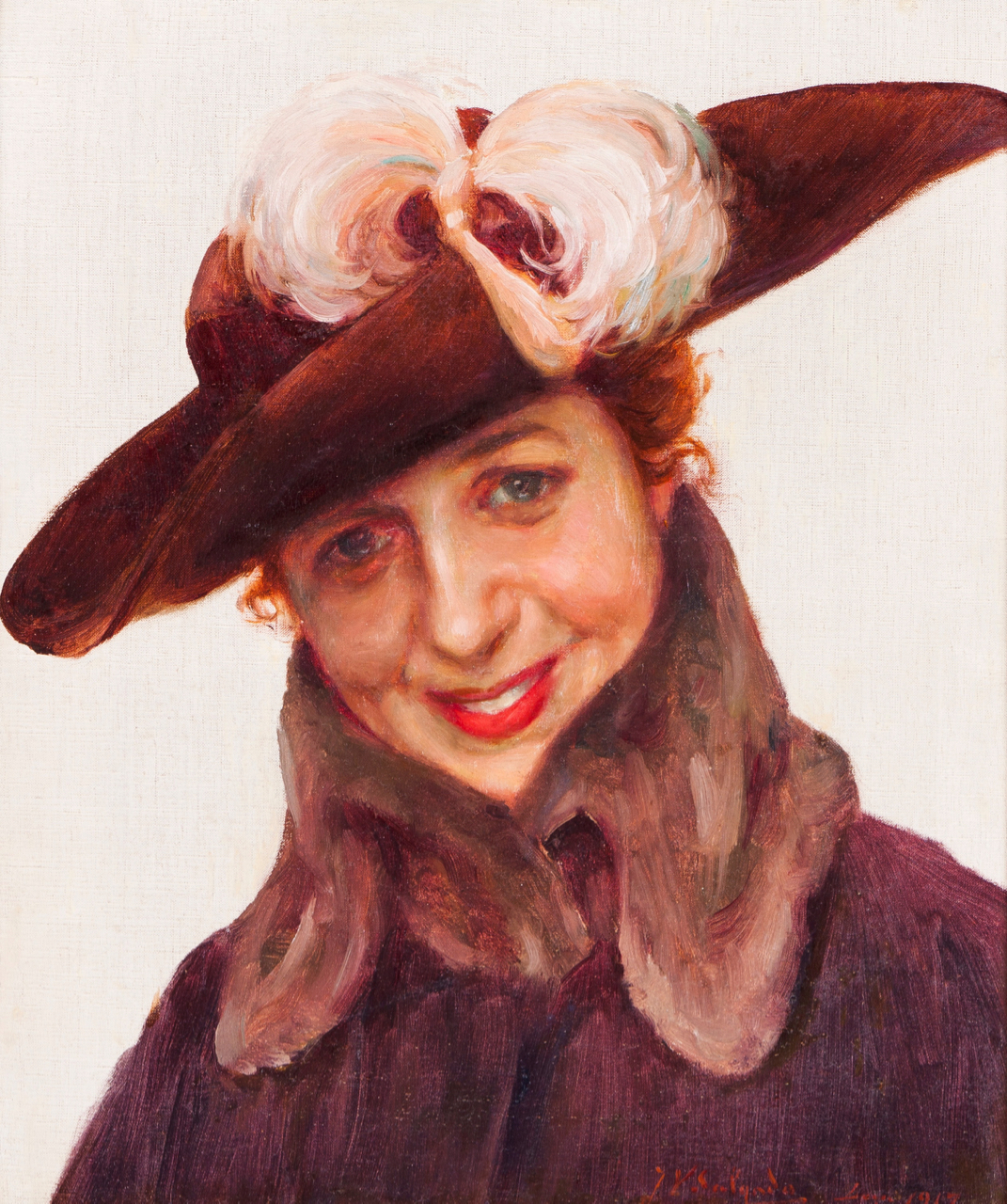
Portrait of a Lady (1917)

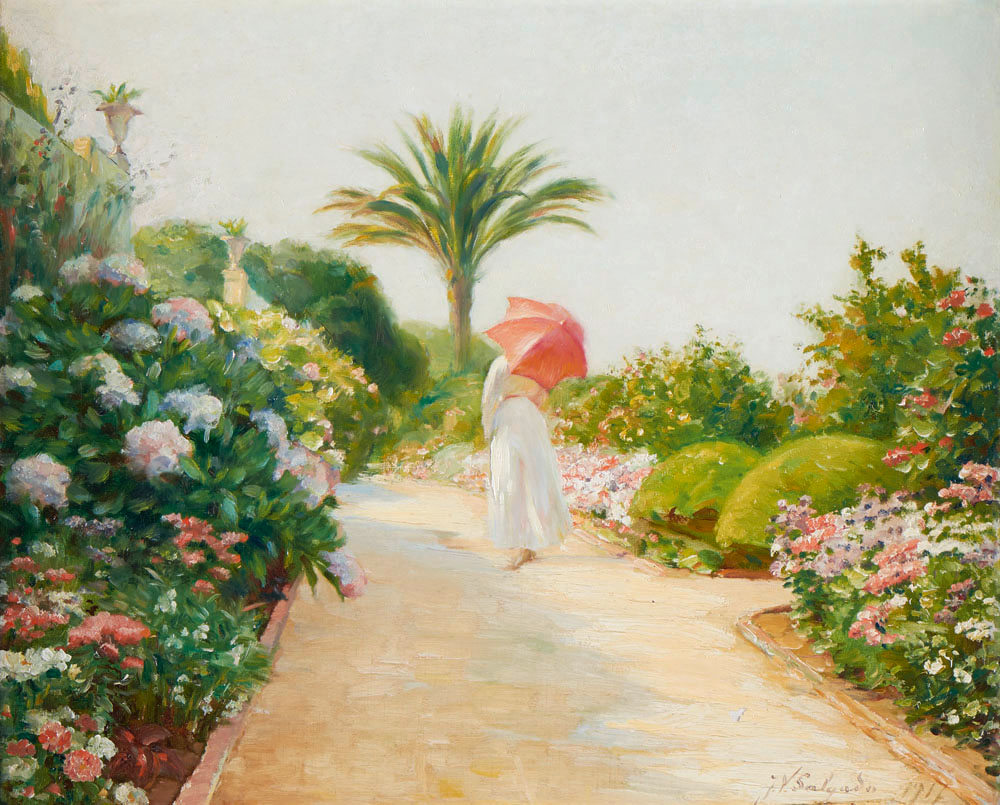
Feminine Figure in the Garden (1917)

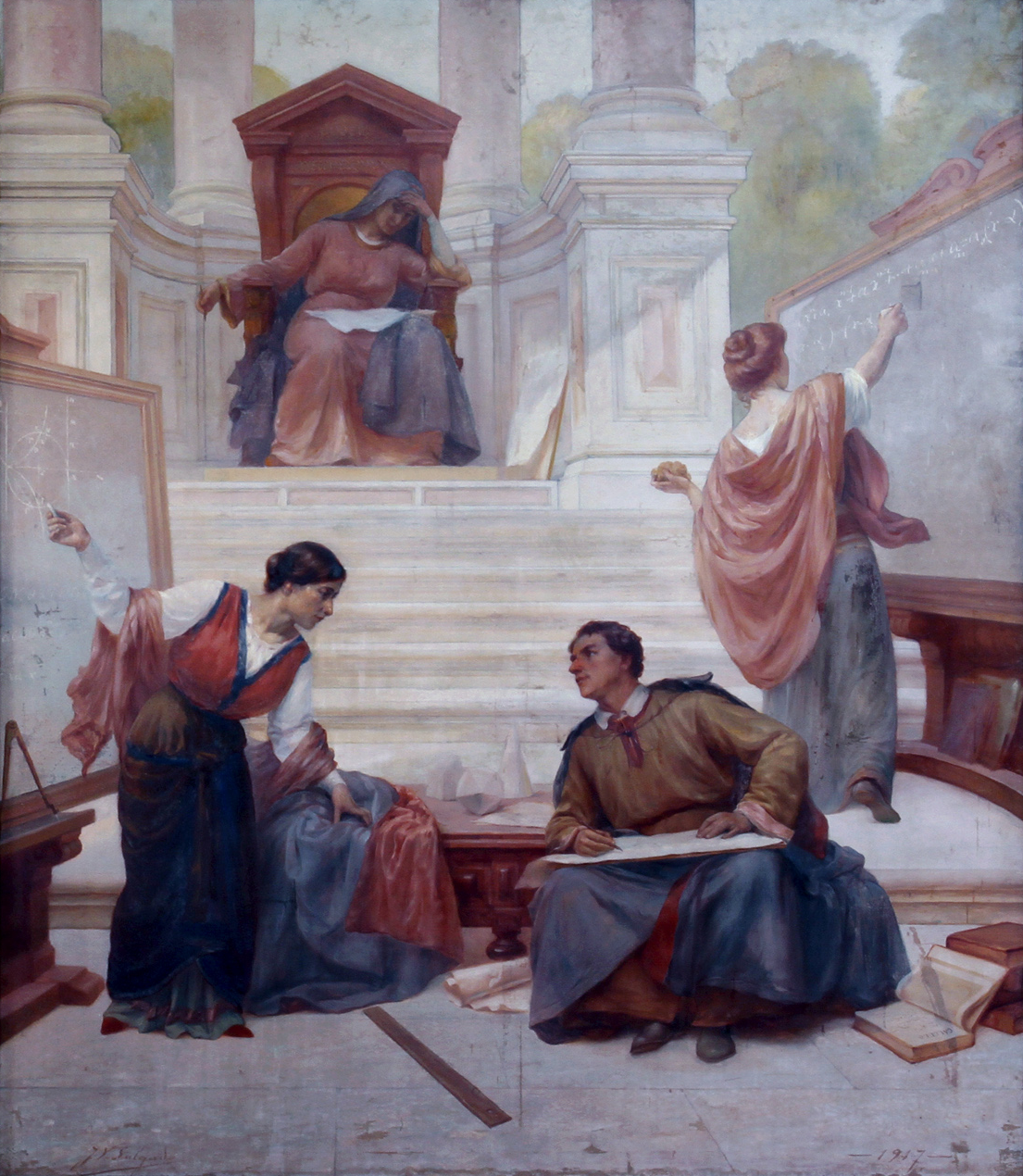
Math (1917), University of Porto.

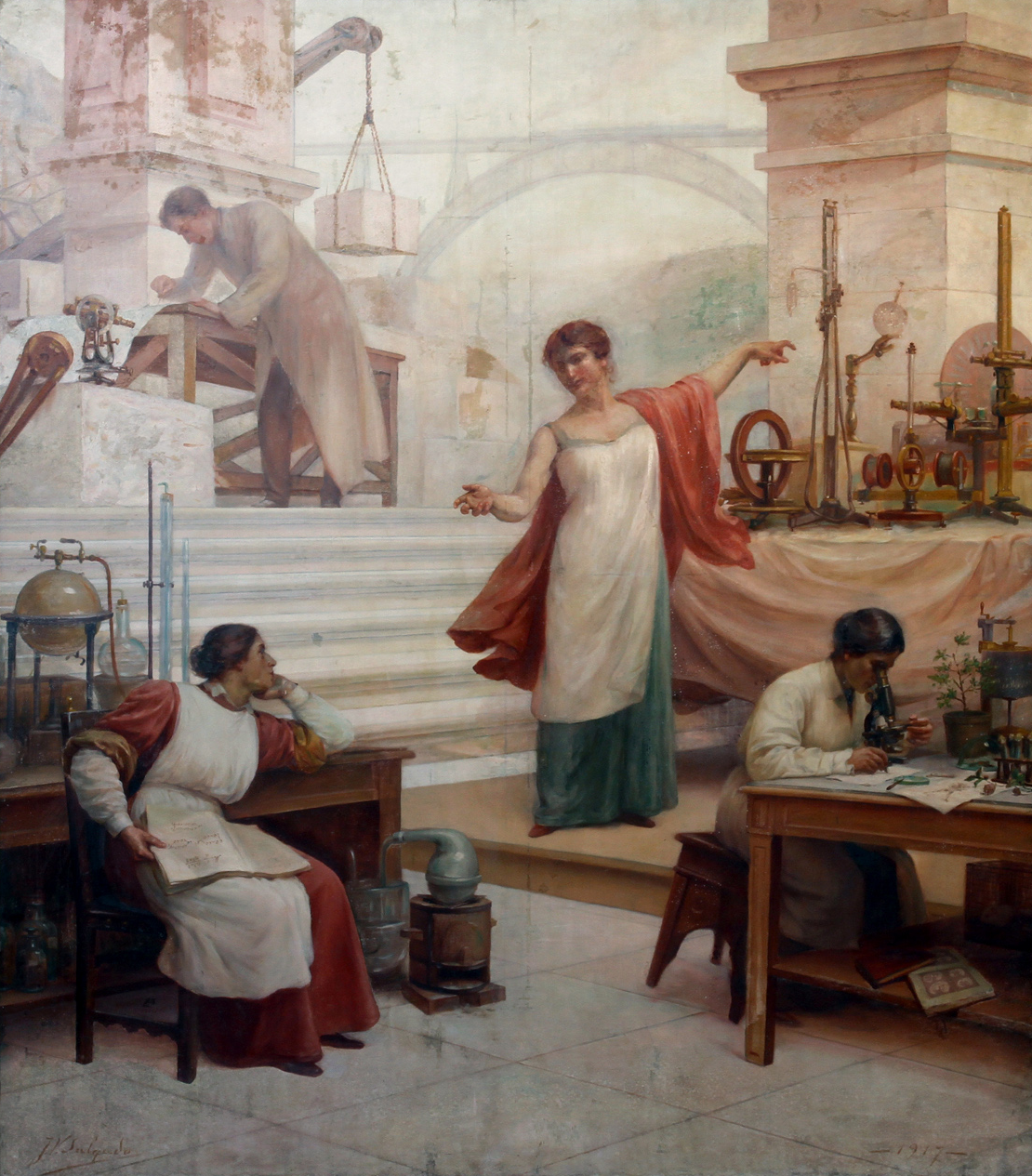
Physical-Natural Sciences (1917), University of Porto.

== Bibliography ==
- Saraiva, José Hermano (2004). "Dicionário de personalidades: Redinha a Silva". História de Portugal (in Portuguese). Vol. 19. QuidNovi. ISBN 989-554-124-4.
- "José Maria Veloso Salgado (1864-1945)". sigarra.up.pt (in Portuguese). University of Porto.
