= Carballeda =

Carballeda may refer to:

- La Carballeda, comarca in Zamora Province, Spain
- Carballeda de Valdeorras, municipality in Ourense Province, Galicia, Spain
- Carballeda de Avia, municipality in Ourense Province, Galicia, Spain
