= Castrelo de Miño =

- Municipality
- Coat of arms

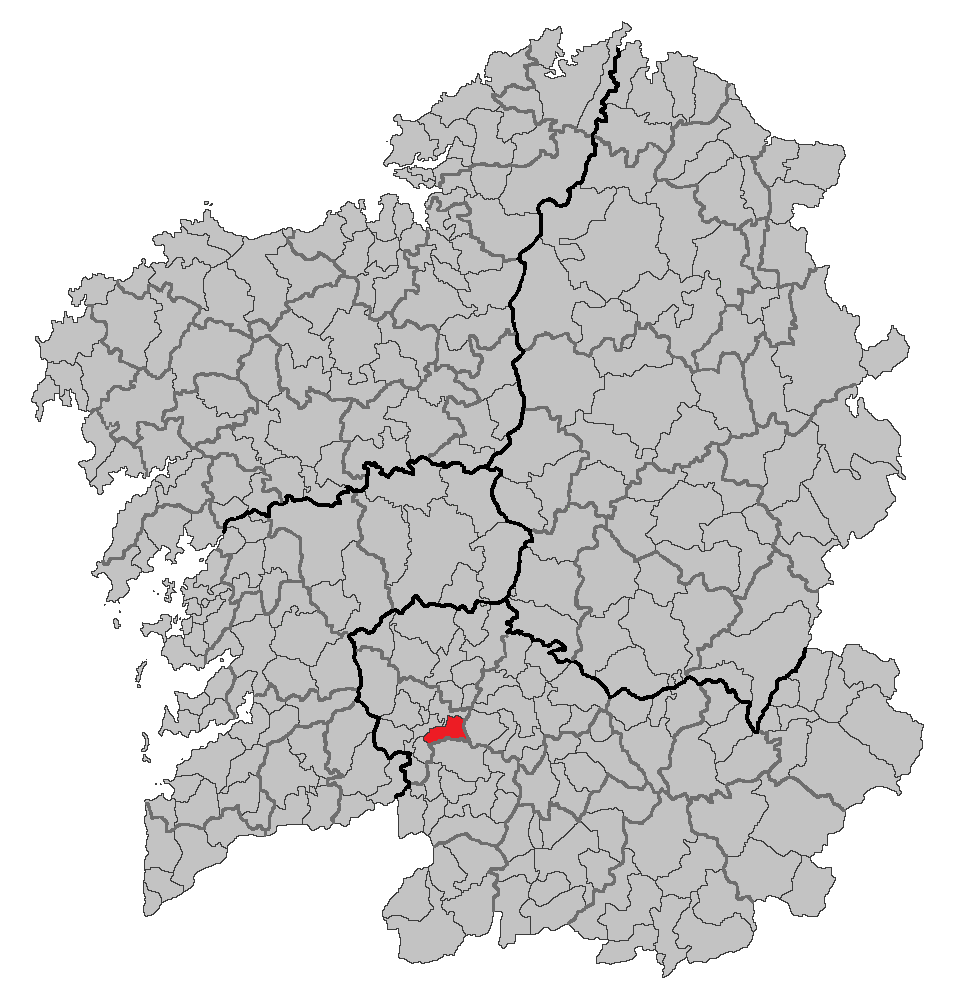
- Location in Galicia

- Location in Spain
- Coordinates: 42°17′40″N 8°04′00″W
- Country: Spain
- Autonomous community: Galicia
- Province: Ourense
- Comarca: O Ribeiro

Government
  - Mayor: Avelino Pazos Pérez (PPdeG)

Area
  - Total: 39.7 km^{2} (15.3 sq mi)
- Elevation: 159 m (522 ft)

Population (2025-01-01)
  - Total: 1,289
  - Density: 32.5/km^{2} (84.1/sq mi)
- Time zone: UTC+1 (CET)
  - Summer (DST): UTC+2 (CEST)
- INE municipality code: 32022
- Website: www.castrelo.org

Castrelo de Miño is a small municipality in the province of Ourense, in the autonomous community of Galicia, Spain. It belongs to the comarca of O Ribeiro.
