= Cenlle =

- Municipality
- Coat of arms

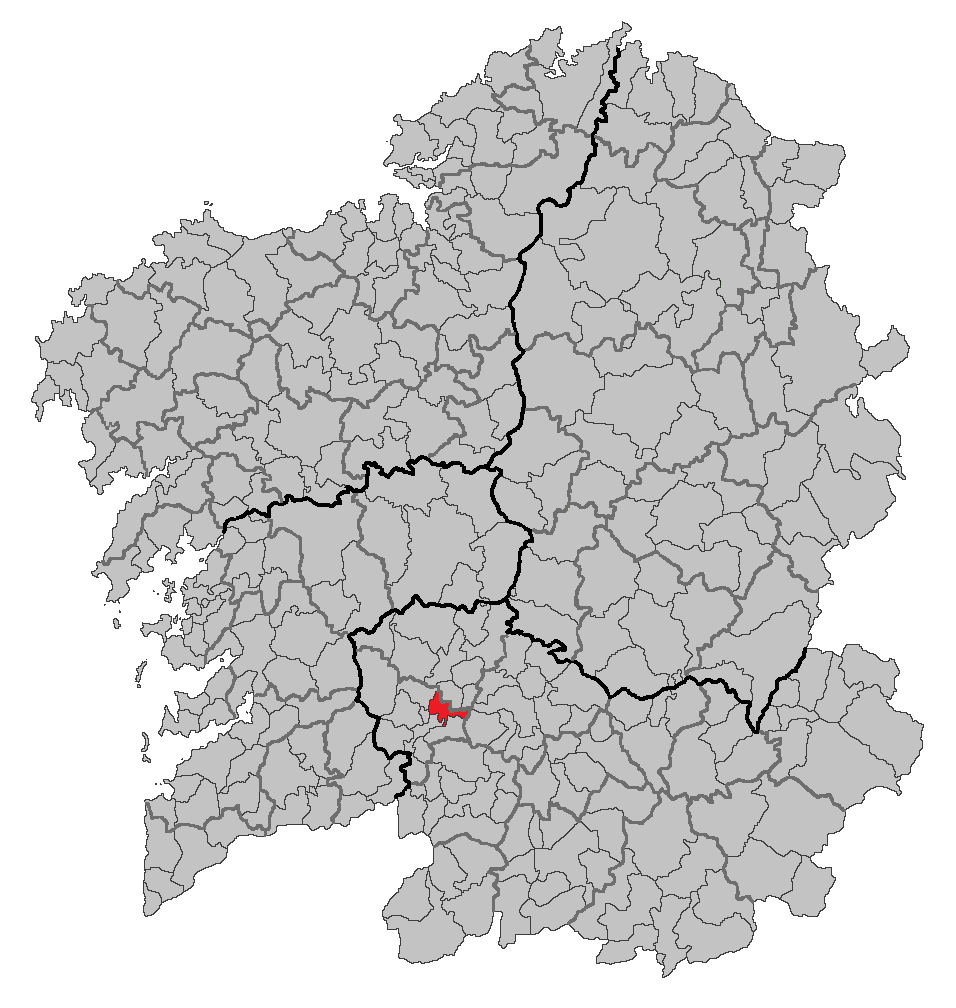
- Location in Galicia

- Location in Spain
- Coordinates: 42°20′33″N 8°05′16″W
- Country: Spain
- Autonomous community: Galicia
- Province: Ourense
- Comarca: O Ribeiro

Government
  - Mayor: Rebeca Sotelo (PPdeG)

Area
  - Total: 29.0 km^{2} (11.2 sq mi)
- Elevation: 117 m (384 ft)

Population (2025-01-01)
  - Total: 1,066
  - Density: 36.8/km^{2} (95.2/sq mi)
- Time zone: UTC+1 (CET)
  - Summer (DST): UTC+2 (CEST)
- INE municipality code: 32025

Cenlle is a municipality in the province of Ourense, in the autonomous community of Galicia, Spain. It belongs to the comarca of O Ribeiro.
