= Beade, Ourense =

Beade
- Municipality
- Coat of arms

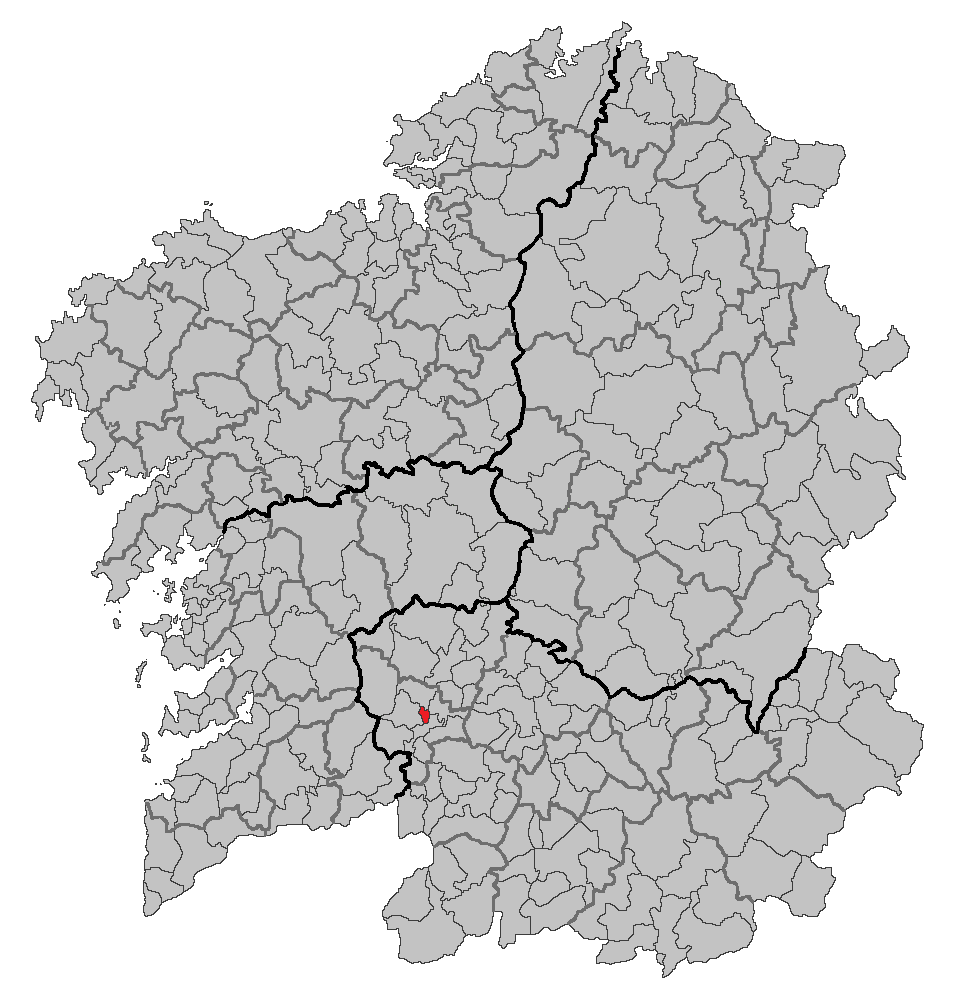
- Location in Galicia

- Location in Spain
- Coordinates: 42°20′5″N 8°8′44″W
- Country: Spain
- Autonomous community: Galicia
- Province: Ourense
- Comarca: O Ribeiro

Government
  - Mayor: Fernando Taboada (PPdeG)

Area
  - Total: 6.4 km^{2} (2.5 sq mi)
- Elevation: 137 m (449 ft)

Population (2025-01-01)
  - Total: 363
  - Density: 57/km^{2} (150/sq mi)
- Time zone: UTC+1 (CET)
  - Summer (DST): UTC+2 (CEST)
- INE municipality code: 32010
- Website: Official website

Beade is a small municipality in the province of Ourense, in the autonomous community of Galicia, Spain. It belongs to the comarca of O Ribeiro.
