= A Barca =

Coordinates: 42.2165°N 8.1814°W

A Barca is an abandoned hamlet located in the municipality of Cortegada, Ourense, Galicia, Spain. It is located near the Minho River and the Portuguese border. It consists of twelve houses and measures around 15,000 square metres (3.7 acres).

== History ==
The hamlet was founded in the 15th century. The site at A Barca was once part of the royal road to Castille, and the river Minho could be crossed by boat there. The hamlet derives its name from this, with barco meaning "boat" in Spanish. By the 1920s, the business of transporting people and goods from one side of the river to the other had collapsed due to the construction of a bridge nearby. The inhabitants then invested in the growing of grapes.

=== Abandonment ===
The building of the Frieira dam in the 1950s led to higher water levels and the flooding of the land near A Barca. The electricity company Unión Fenosa later bought out the hamlet residents. The construction of the dam, combined with the rerouting of trade routes, led to the abandonment of the village.

On 14 January 2013, the company Gas Natural, successor to Unión Fenosa, gave ownership of the hamlet to the municipality. By the date of the transfer, the municipality already had plans for the hamlet to be turned into a tourist site.

=== Sale ===
As of March 2014, the whole hamlet is to be given away for free to a new owner who promises to redevelop the village and preserve the buildings, as the municipality lacks funds to do so. The mayor of Cortegada, Avelino Luis de Francisco Martínez, has said the municipality wishes to generate economic activity in the area by the sale of the hamlet. Since the hamlet was up for offer, there have been close to a thousand requests for information, but no serious candidates. The municipality is looking for a designation in the area of tourism. There have already been offers to construct a luxury resort, a clinic, a hippie community, a cheese factory and a meditation complex.

The current twelve buildings, four of which have multiple floors, are currently in a state of disrepair with only walls still standing. Due to severe overgrowth of vegetation, the hamlet cannot be seen from the air.

== Transportation ==
The hamlet is only accessible by a non-paved path diverging from the road towards Celanova.
