= O Ribeiro =

Coordinates: 42°17′46″N 8°08′21″W

- Comarca
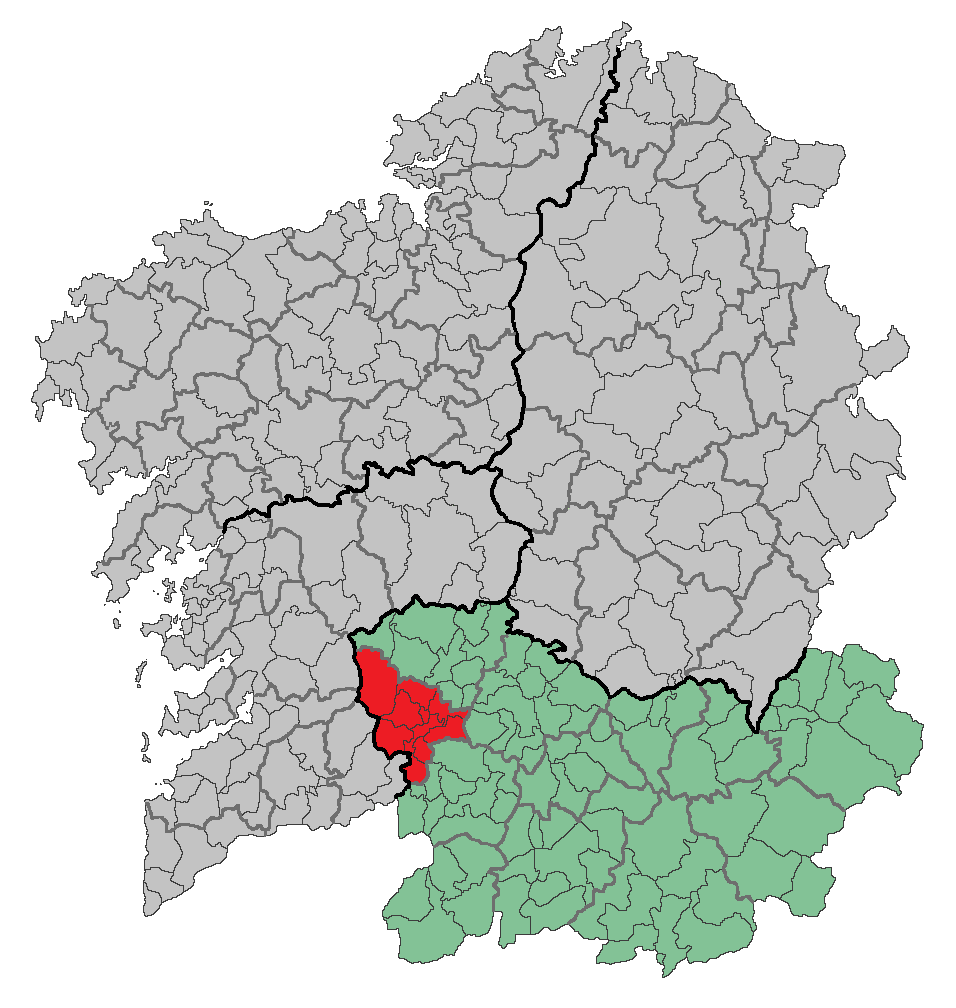
- Country: Spain
- Autonomous community: Galicia
- Province: Ourense
- Capital: Ribadavia
- Municipalities: List: A Arnoia, Avión, Beade, Carballeda de Avia, Castrelo de Miño, Cenlle, Cortegada, Leiro, Melón, Ribadavia

Area
  - Total: 406.95 km^{2} (157.12 sq mi)

Population (2019)
  - Total: 15,808
  - Density: 38.845/km^{2} (100.61/sq mi)
- Time zone: UTC+1 (CET)
  - Summer (DST): UTC+2 (CEST)

O Ribeiro is a comarca in the Galician Province of Ourense. The overall population of this local region is 15,808 (2019).

== Municipalities ==
A Arnoia, Avión, Beade, Carballeda de Avia, Castrelo de Miño, Cenlle, Cortegada, Leiro, Melón and Ribadavia.

== See also ==
- Ribeiro (DO)
