= Carballeda de Avia =

- municipality
- Coat of arms

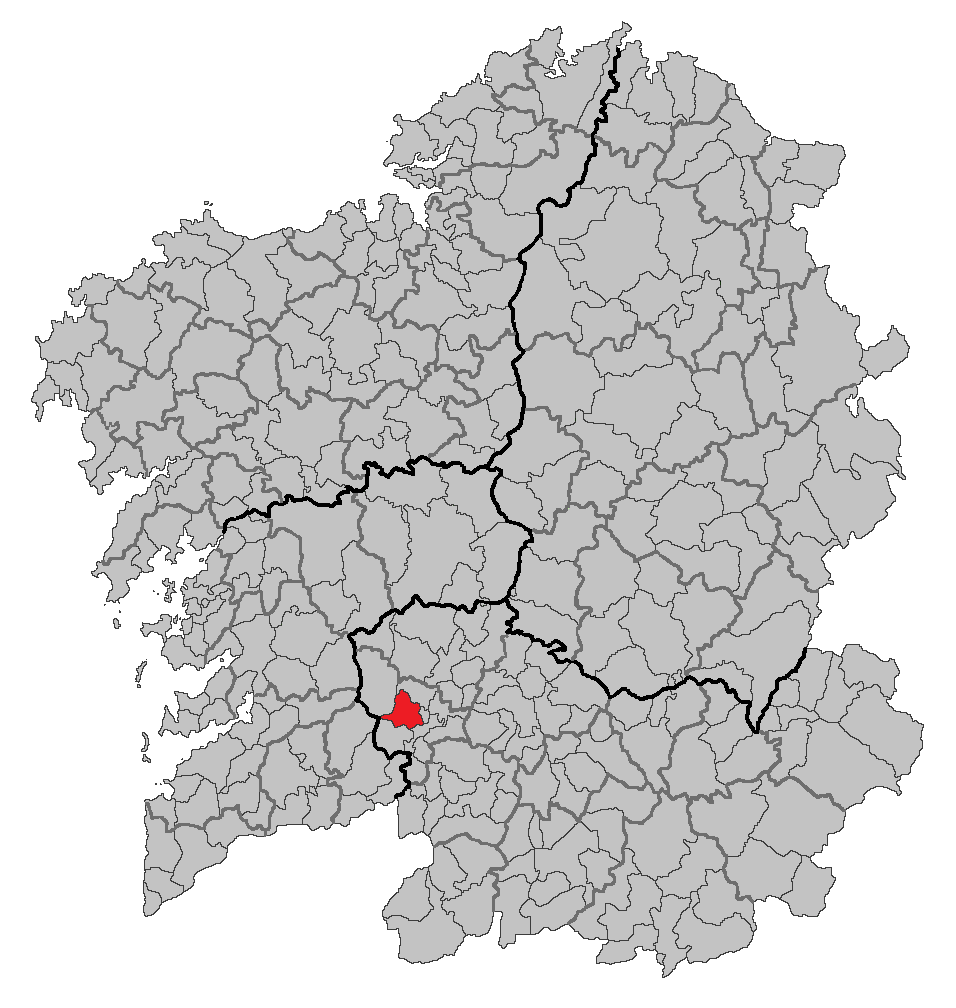
- Location in Galicia

- Location in Spain
- Coordinates: 42°19′17″N 8°9′55″W
- Country: Spain
- Autonomous community: Galicia
- Province: Ourense
- Comarca: O Ribeiro

Government
  - Mayor: Luis Milia Méndez (Spanish Socialist Workers' Party)

Area
  - Total: 47 km^{2} (18 sq mi)
- Elevation: 249 m (817 ft)

Population (2025-01-01)
  - Total: 1,172
  - Density: 25/km^{2} (65/sq mi)
- Time zone: UTC+1 (CET)
  - Summer (DST): UTC+2 (CEST)
- INE municipality code: 32018
- Website: www.carballedadeavia.com

Carballeda de Avia is a municipality in the province of Ourense, in the autonomous community of Galicia, Spain. It belongs to the comarca of O Ribeiro. It is located to the west of the province, 5.7 kilometres (3.5 mi) northwest of Ribadavia off the A-52 road. As of 2012 it had a population of 1487 people. It is a wine-producing area with about 3000 hectares dedicated to vineyards, some of which are at an altitude of 479 metres (1,572 ft). River valleys in the municipality include the Miño, Avia, Arnoia and Barbantiño.

== Parishes ==
- Abelenda das Penas (Santo André)
- Balde (San Martiño)
- Beiro (San Pedro)
- Carballeda (San Miguel)
- Faramontaos (San Cosmede)
- Muimenta (San Xiao)
- Santo Estevo de Nóvoa (Santo Estevo)
- Vilar de Condes (Santa María)
