= Leiro =

- Municipality
- Coat of arms

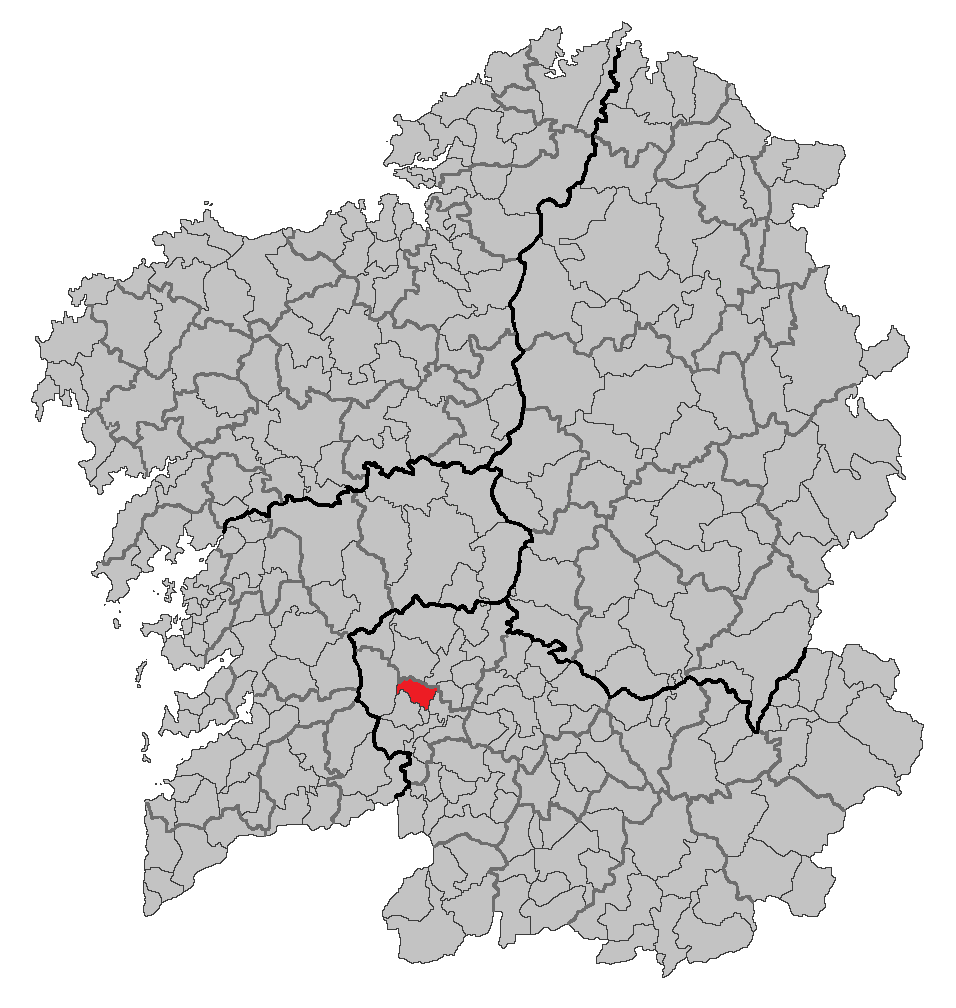
- Location in Galicia

- Location in Spain
- Coordinates: 42°22′09″N 8°07′29″W
- Country: Spain
- Autonomous community: Galicia
- Province: Ourense
- Comarca: O Ribeiro

Government
  - Mayor: Francisco José Fernández Pérez (PPdeG)

Area
  - Total: 38.3 km^{2} (14.8 sq mi)
- Elevation: 90 m (300 ft)

Population (2025-01-01)
  - Total: 1,517
  - Density: 39.6/km^{2} (103/sq mi)
- Time zone: UTC+1 (CET)
  - Summer (DST): UTC+2 (CEST)
- Website: Official website

Leiro is a municipality in the province of Ourense, in the autonomous community of Galicia, Spain. It belongs to the comarca of O Ribeiro.
