= Cortegada =

- Municipality
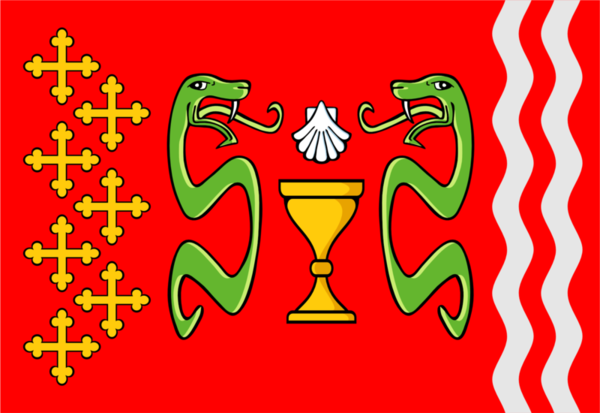
- Flag Coat of arms

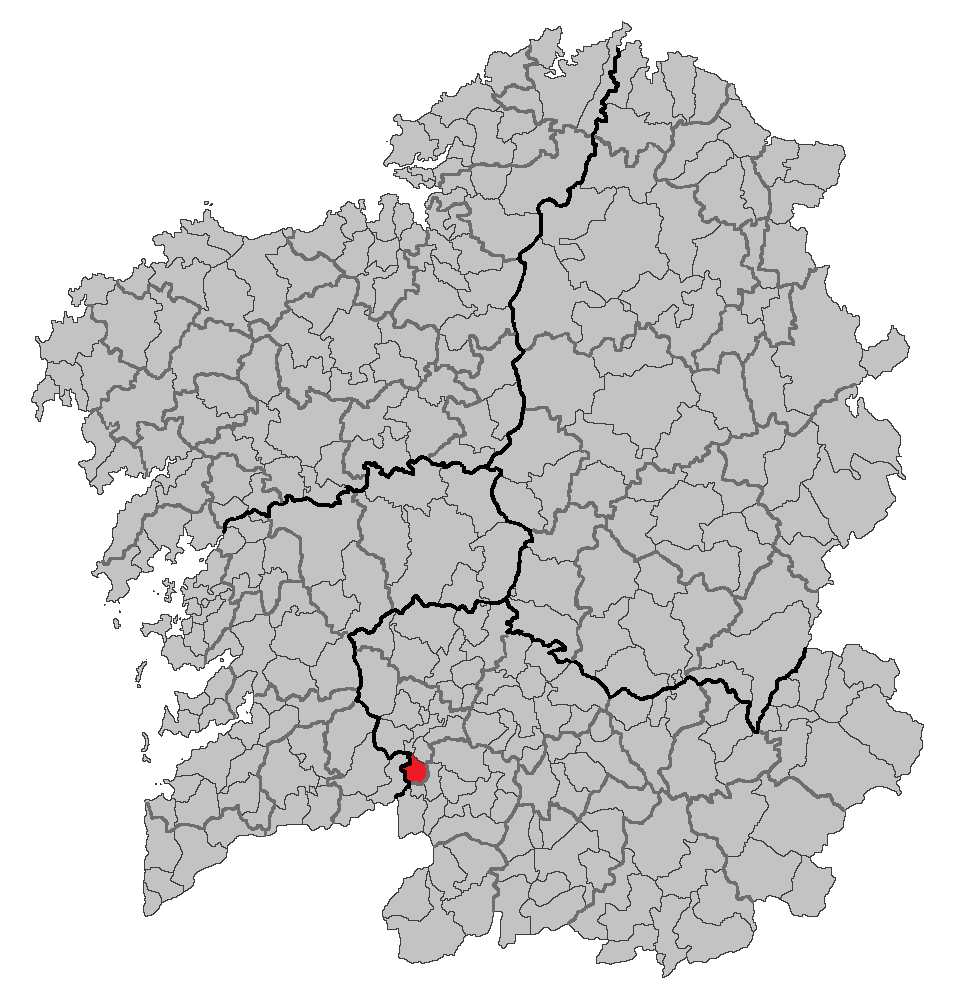
- Location in Galicia

- Location in Spain
- Coordinates: 42°12′25″N 8°10′09″W
- Country: Spain
- Autonomous community: Galicia
- Province: Ourense
- Comarca: O Ribeiro

Area
  - Total: 26.9 km^{2} (10.4 sq mi)
- Elevation: 146 m (479 ft)

Population (2025-01-01)
  - Total: 1,027
  - Density: 38.2/km^{2} (98.9/sq mi)
- Time zone: UTC+1 (CET)
  - Summer (DST): UTC+2 (CEST)
- INE municipality code: 32027

Cortegada is a municipality in the province of Ourense, in the autonomous community of Galicia, Spain. It belongs to the comarca of O Ribeiro. It has a population of 1,407 (2004) and an area of 27 km^{2} (10 sq mi). It contains the abandoned hamlet of A Barca.
