= Avión =

- Municipality
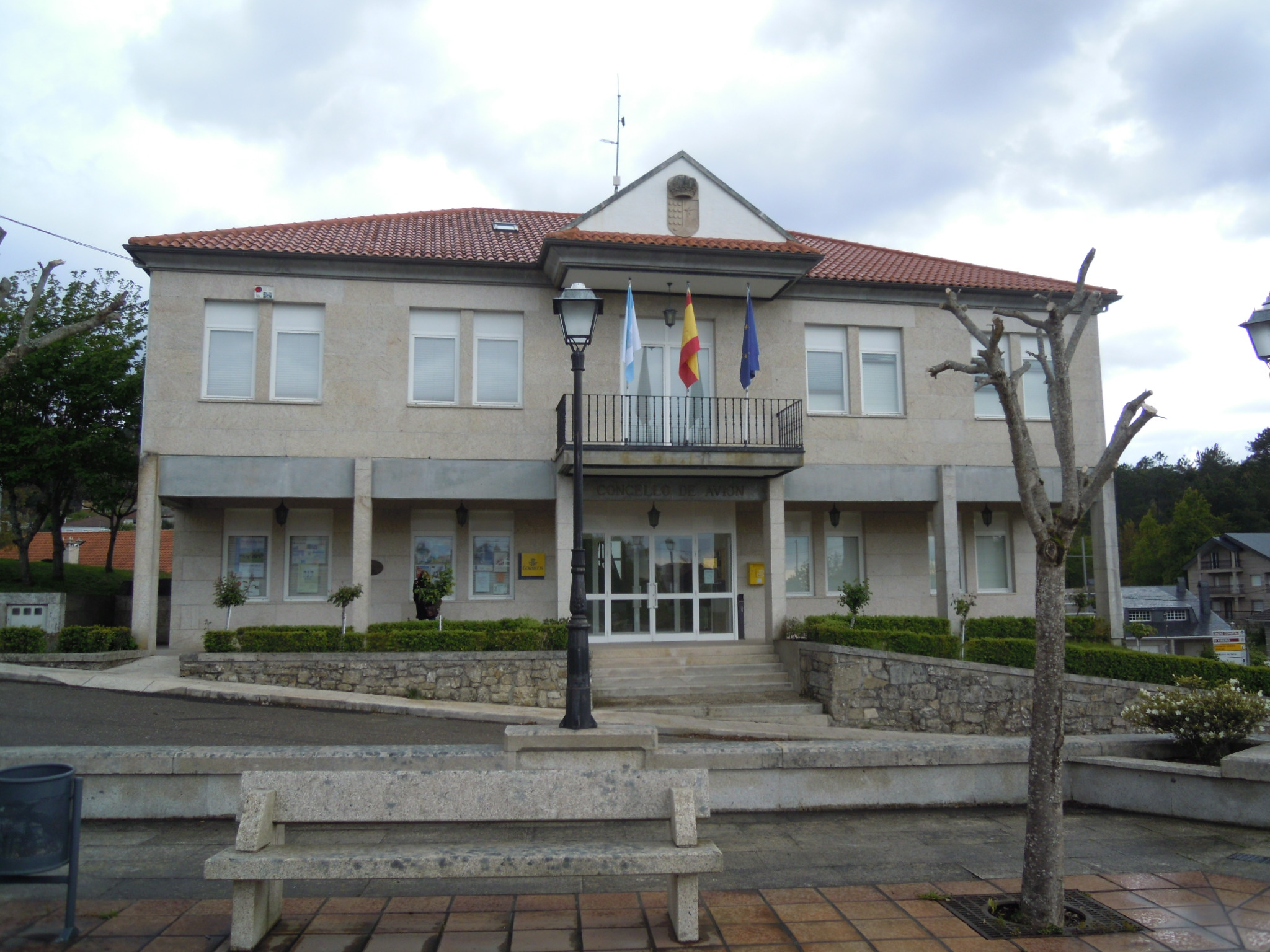
- Municipal hall

- Coat of arms

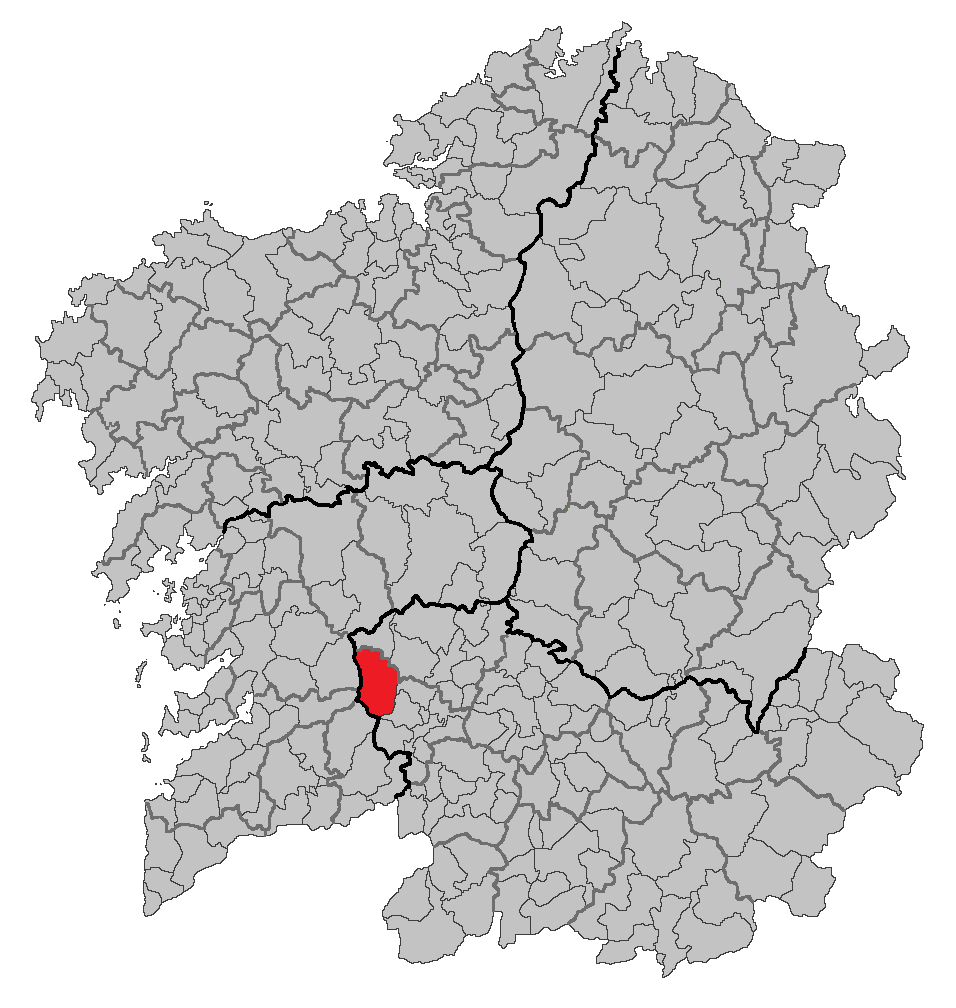
- Location in Galicia

- Location in Galicia
- Coordinates: 42°23′18″N 8°16′22″W
- Country: Spain
- Autonomous community: Galicia
- Province: Ourense
- Comarca: O Ribeiro

Government
  - Mayor: Antonio Montero Fernández (PPdeG)

Area
  - Total: 121.13 km^{2} (46.77 sq mi)

Population (2025)
  - Total: 1,704
  - Density: 14.07/km^{2} (36.43/sq mi)
- Time zone: UTC+1 (CET)
  - Summer (DST): UTC+2 (CEST)
- INE municipality code: 32004
- Website: concelloavion.org/web/

Avión is a town and municipality in the province of Ourense in the autonomous community of Galicia in Spain. It belongs to the comarca of O Ribeiro. It has 1,704 inhabitants.

The town is the summer retreat of Spanish-Mexican millionaire Olegario Vázquez Raña who has hosted Mexican billionaire Carlos Slim there several times, and of other wealthy Mexicans who own summer homes there.

== Demographics ==
As of 2025, the population is 1,704, of which 45.4% are males, and 54.6% are females. Minors make up 7.0% of the population, and seniors make up 48.2%.

Historical population

Year	Pop.	±%
1842	4,865	—
1857	4,809	−1.2%
1877	5,073	+5.5%
1887	5,105	+0.6%
1900	5,197	+1.8%
1910	5,557	+6.9%
1920	6,022	+8.4%
1930	6,352	+5.5%
1940	6,434	+1.3%

Year	Pop.	±%
1950	5,988	−6.9%
1960	6,004	+0.3%
1970	3,763	−37.3%
1981	4,120	+9.5%
1991	3,549	−13.9%
2001	2,775	−21.8%
2011	2,371	−14.6%
2021	1,734	−26.9%

Source: INE

=== Immigration ===
As of 2025, immigrants make up 35.4% of the population. The 5 largest foreign countries of birth are Mexico, making up 67.5% of immigrants, followed by Venezuela, Colombia, Uruguay, and Brazil.

Foreign population by country of birth (2025)
Country of birth	Population	Country of birth	Population
Mexico	408	Germany	11
Venezuela	102	United States	7
Colombia	14	Switzerland	6
Uruguay	14	Portugal	5
Brazil	12	Argentina	5
