= Ribadavia =

- Municipality
- Coat of arms

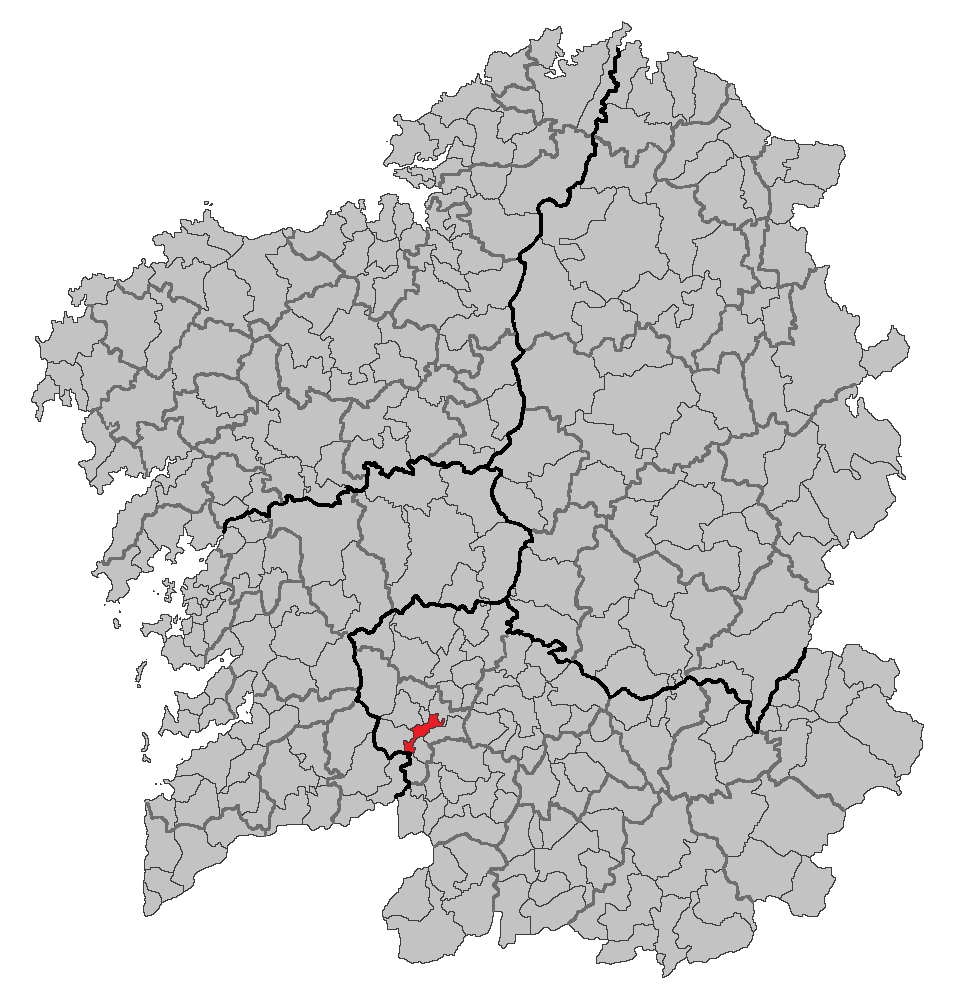
- Situation of Ribadavia within Galicia

- Location in Spain
- Country: Spain
- Autonomous community: Galicia
- Province: Ourense
- Comarca: O Ribeiro

Government
  - Alcalde (Mayor): Marcos Blanco Jorge

Area
  - Total: 25.2 km^{2} (9.7 sq mi)

Population (2025-01-01)
  - Total: 4,895
  - Density: 194/km^{2} (503/sq mi)
- Time zone: UTC+1 (CET)
  - Summer (DST): UTC+2 (CET)
- Website: ribadavia.es/

Spanish Cultural Heritage
- Type: Non-movable
- Criteria: Historic ensemble
- Designated: 17 October 1947
- Reference no.: RI-53-0000013

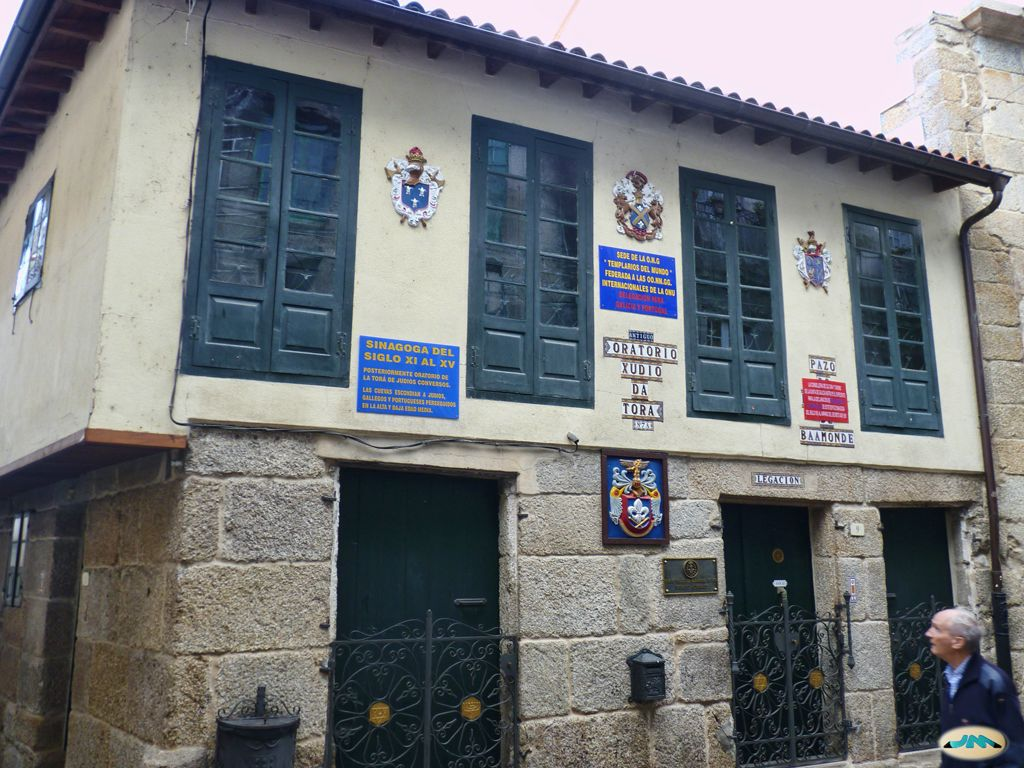
The old synagogue in Ribadavia.

Ribadavia is a town and municipality located in the southwest of the province of Ourense, in the autonomous community of Galicia, Spain. It belongs to the comarca of O Ribeiro. The urban area lies on the right bank of the Miño river and the last course of the Avia river. It is the capital of the comarca of the Ribeiro. Near N-120 road and A-52 Rias Baixas highway, it is 25 kilometres (16 mi) from the provincial capital and 65 kilometres (40 mi) from Vigo.

The town was declared a Historic-Artistic ensemble in 1947. Near the Campo da Feira, one can find the ruins of the castle of the Sarmientos, the Counts of Ribadavia, dating from the fifteenth century. It still preserves the interior, towers and the walls. Parts of the walls that surrounded the town are also still standing. Inside the old quarter (casco vello/Barrio Xudeu), one can visit the main square (Praza Maior) with interesting buildings like the sixteenth-century town hall. There are also buildings remaining from what was once a large Jewish quarter, including a synagogue. All the economic life of the comarca of the Ribeiro has centered on, since the twelfth century, the vines first brought by the monks of Cluny who accompanied the first count of Galicia, Raymond of Burgundy. Today, the wine is commercialised under the protected designation of origin Ribeiro.

== Bibliography ==
- (in Spanish) Leopoldo Meruéndano Arias, Los Judíos de Ribadavia y orígen de las cuatro parroquias.
- (in Spanish) Samuel Eiján, Historia de Ribadavia y sus alrededores.
