= Melón =

- Municipality
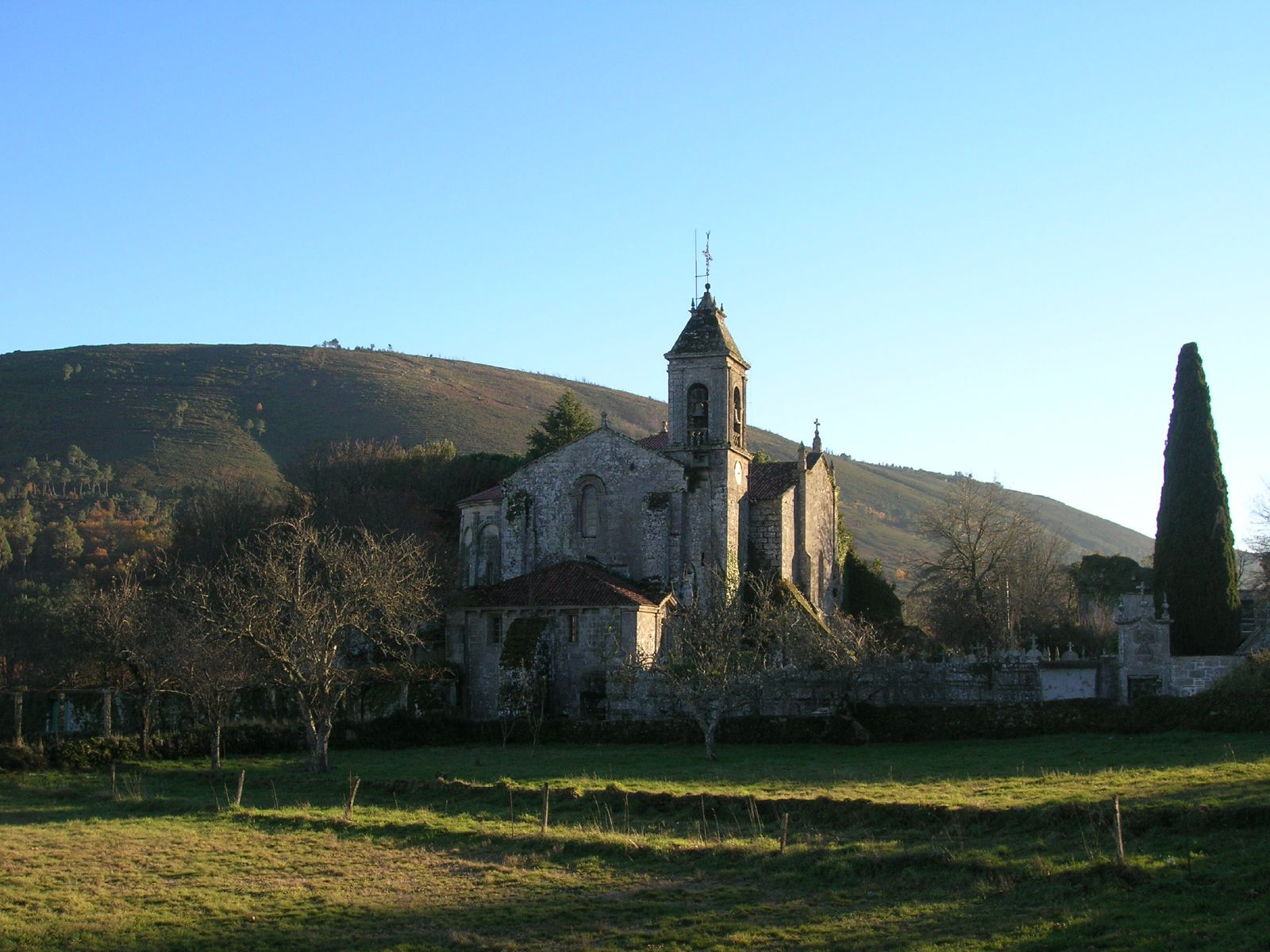
- Monastery of Santa María de Melón.

- Flag Coat of arms

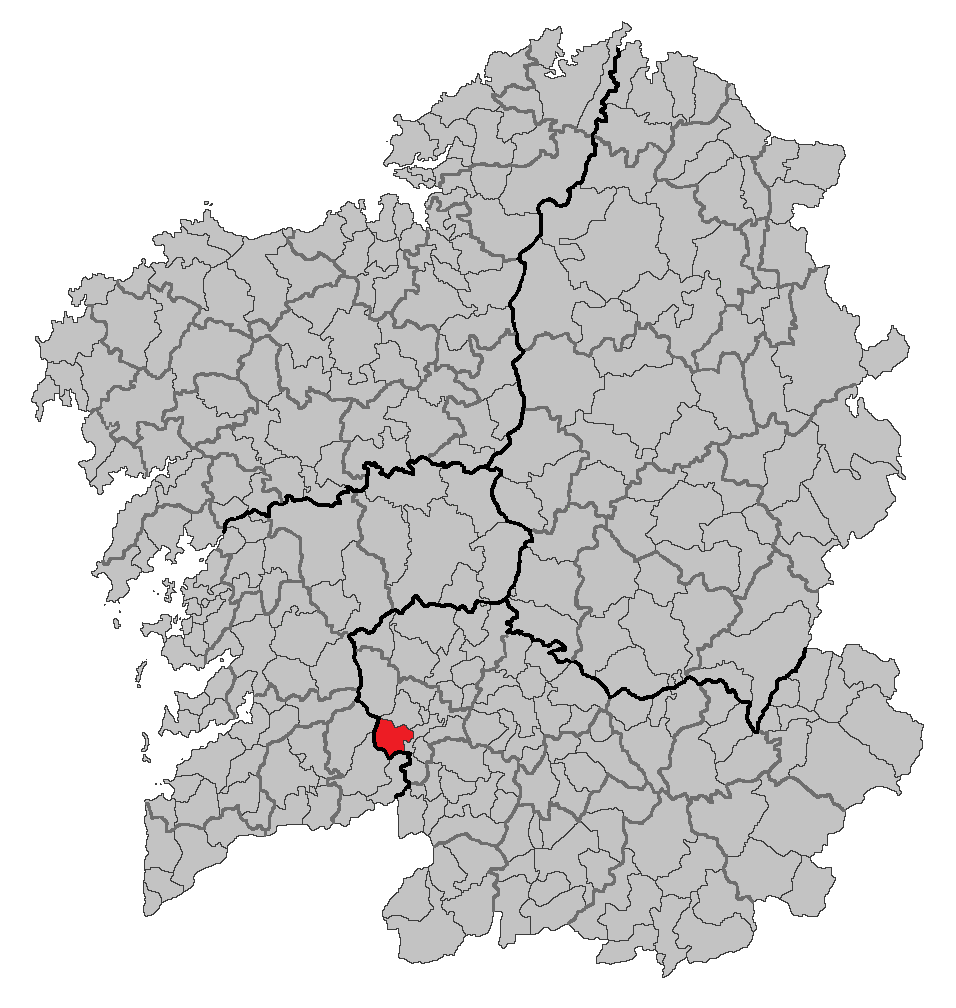
- Location in Galicia

- Location in Spain
- Coordinates: 42°15′27″N 8°13′02″W
- Country: Spain
- Autonomous community: Galicia
- Province: Ourense
- Comarca: O Ribeiro

Government
  - Mayor: Emilio Luis Díaz (PSdeG-PSOE)

Area
  - Total: 53.4 km^{2} (20.6 sq mi)
- Elevation: 456 m (1,496 ft)

Population (2016)
  - Total: 1,280
  - Density: 24.0/km^{2} (62.1/sq mi)
- Time zone: UTC+1
  - Summer (DST): UTC+2 (CEST)
- Website: melon.gal//

Melón is a municipality in the province of Ourense, in the autonomous community of Galicia, Spain. It belongs to the comarca of O Ribeiro. It has a population of 1582 (Spanish 2006 Census) and an area of 53.22 km².
