= List of municipalities in Lugo =

Map of Spain with the province of Lugo highlighted

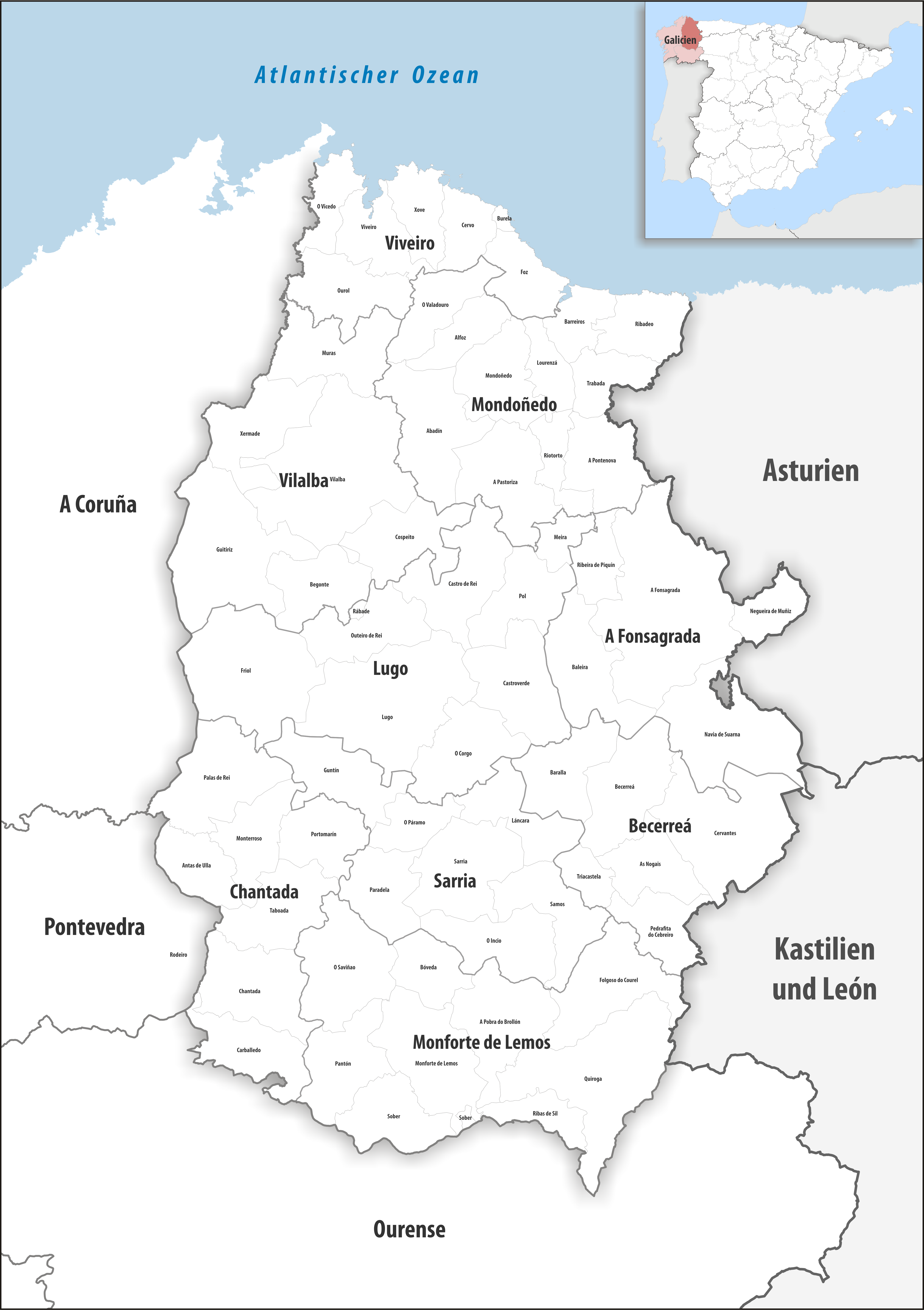
Map of the municipalities in the province of Lugo

This is a list of the municipalities in the province of Lugo, in the autonomous community of Galicia, Spain.

The Galician name is the sole official Older or informal texts may use Castilian forms or spellings.

Name	Population (2002)
Abadín	3,342
Alfoz	2,398
Antas de Ulla	2,719
Baleira	1,845
Baralla	3,279
Barreiros	3,357
Becerreá	3,532
Begonte	3,748
Bóveda	1,974
Burela	8,176
Carballedo	3,121
Castro de Rei	5,966
Castroverde	3,418
Cervantes	2,135
Cervo	5,016
O Corgo	4,224
Cospeito	5,706
Chantada	9,695
Folgoso do Courel	1,510
A Fonsagrada	5,146
Foz	9,612
Friol	4,729
Guitiriz	6,249
Guntín	3,453
O Incio	2,455
Láncara	3,235
Lourenzá	2,779
Lugo	89,509
Meira	1,816
Mondoñedo	4,987
Monforte de Lemos	19,817
Monterroso	4,253
Muras	1,067
Navia de Suarna	1,869
Negueira de Muñiz	233
As Nogais	1,547
Ourol	1,465
Outeiro de Rei	4,333
Palas de Rei	4,135
Pantón	3,377
Paradela	2,552
O Páramo	1,925
A Pastoriza	3,975
Pedrafita do Cebreiro	1,562
A Pobra do Brollón	2,572
Pol	2,072
A Pontenova	3,261
Portomarín	2,035
Quiroga	4,209
Rábade	1,583
Ribadeo	9,163
Ribas de Sil	1,406
Ribeira de Piquín	842
Riotorto	1,830
Samos	2,073
Sarria	13,053
O Saviñao	5,000
Sober	3,009
Taboada	4,077
Trabada	1,616
Triacastela	882
O Valadouro	2,371
O Vicedo	2,303
Vilalba	15,520
Viveiro	15,444
Xermade	2,595
Xove	3,625

== See also ==
- Geography of Spain
- List of cities in Spain
