= Verdes-Montenegro family =

Galician family

The coat of arms of the Verdes-Montenegro Family
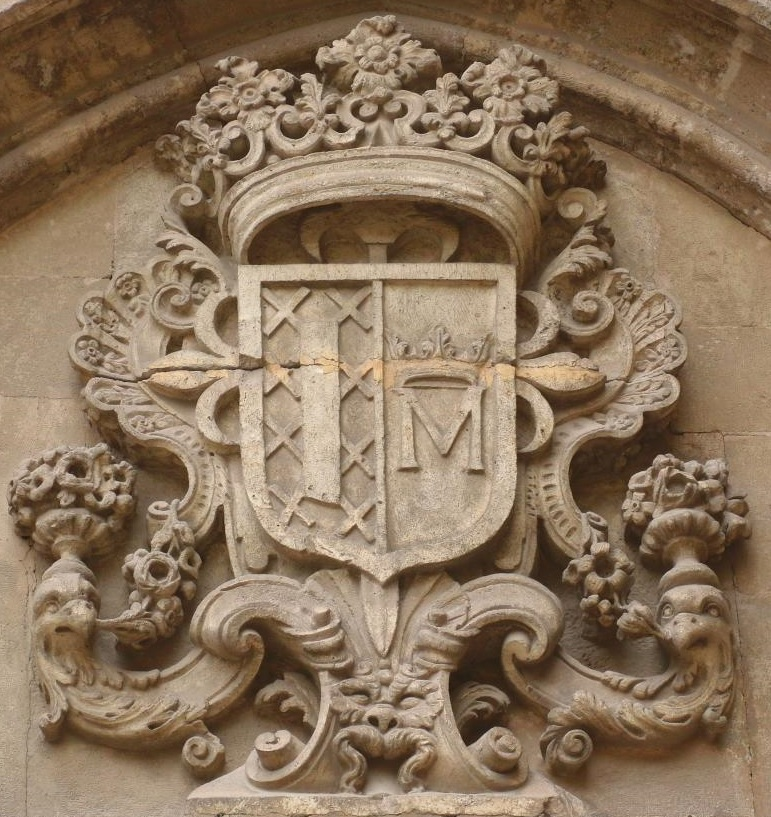
- Adopted: 17th century (coronet probably added in the first quarter of the 19th century).
- Shield: Field: Per pale, an M crowned and a sash surrounded by eight saltires.
- Other elements: The whole escutcheon surmounted by a Grandee of Spain coronet.

The Verdes-Montenegro family was a prominent Spanish family of Galician origins, some of whose members held relevant government and church positions during the most part of the 18th century. Members of the family joined the high Spanish nobility by marriage and their descendants still live in Spain.

== History ==
The origins of the family name can be traced back to the middle 17th century in Galicia (northern Spain) when Bartolome de Verdes, an hidalgo (nobleman) of Cospeito, married Juana de Sanjurjo-Montenegro, daughter of Captain Juan de Sanjurjo-Montenegro, himself a member of the Galician lower nobility. A son of this couple, Francisco de Verdes-Montenegro, born in 1656 in the small village of Sistallo (Cospeito), and his five brothers were the first to style the double-barreled family name Verdes-Montenegro as it was used henceforth. Francisco de Verdes-Montenegro left his home town in 1710 when he was appointed corregidor of Puebla de Sanabria by the Bourbon pretender to the throne of Spain. However, Francisco died a few months later during the siege of Puebla de Sanabria by the Austrian-Portuguese troops in the course of the War of the Spanish Succession. When in 1714 the Bourbon pretender, by then king Philip V of Spain, secured the throne, Francisco de Verdes-Montenegro's sons were rewarded by being appointed to relevant government and church positions.

Pazo de Sistallo, manor house of the Verdes-Montenegro family in Lugo (ca.1750)

In 1678 Francisco de Verdes-Montenegro had married Antonia de Castro (1659–1700) of San Mamed de Oleiros (Villalba), by whom he had seven sons. Of these, Francisco (born ca.1680), Blas and Gregorio (1695–1726) took holy orders. Francisco became prior of the Monastery of San Xoán de Caaveiro in Galicia. in 1740, Blas was abbot of the Monastery of Santo Estevo de Ribas de Miño in O Saviñao (1730) and later of the Monastery of Santo Estebo de Ribas de Sil, and Gregorio was first a scholar at the universities of Santiago de Compostela (1716) and Salamanca (1721) and then became a Noble Canon at the Jaen cathedral in 1726, dying the same year.

However, the three most prominent of the seven brothers pursued high-profile careers as civil servants in the new Bourbon regime established in Spain after the end of the War of Succession. Fernando Verdes-Montenegro (1682–1741) entered the service of the Count-Duke of Benavente, territorial lord of Puebla de Sanabria, shortly after his father's death. A few years later, in 1716, he provided proof of nobility (Note: A candidate who wished to join any of the Spanish military orders had to prove in his first four last names that he, his parents, and his grandparents were of noble descent by blood and had never worked as physicians, attorneys, in manual labour or in trade.) to join the Order of Calatrava. The same year he entered the royal service at His Majesty's Contaduría Mayor (a financial control body) and steadily climbed the ranks until being appointed Secretary of Finance (Secretario del Despacho Universal de Hacienda) in 1724. Four years later, Fernando joined the powerful Royal Council of the Indies and in 1740 he was again appointed Secretary of Finance to king Philip V during his second reign. His younger brother Juan Diego Verdes-Montenegro (1690–1763) followed his steps. He also entered the service of the Count-Duke of Benavente (1716) and went through the exacting admission process to a Military Order, donning the habit of the Order of Santiago in 1730. But in contrast to Fernando, who settled in Madrid, Juan Diego moved to Valencia, where he was appointed Treasurer of the Viceroyalty (customarily named Kingdom of Valencia) and of its Army and also a member of His Majesty's Council at the Contaduría Mayor. Finally, Miguel Verdes-Montenegro (1697–1767) was a scholar at Salamanca (1719–1730), judge at the Royal Chancellery of Valladolid (1738), Knight of the Order of Santiago (1740) and Dean of the Council of the Spanish military orders in 1767.

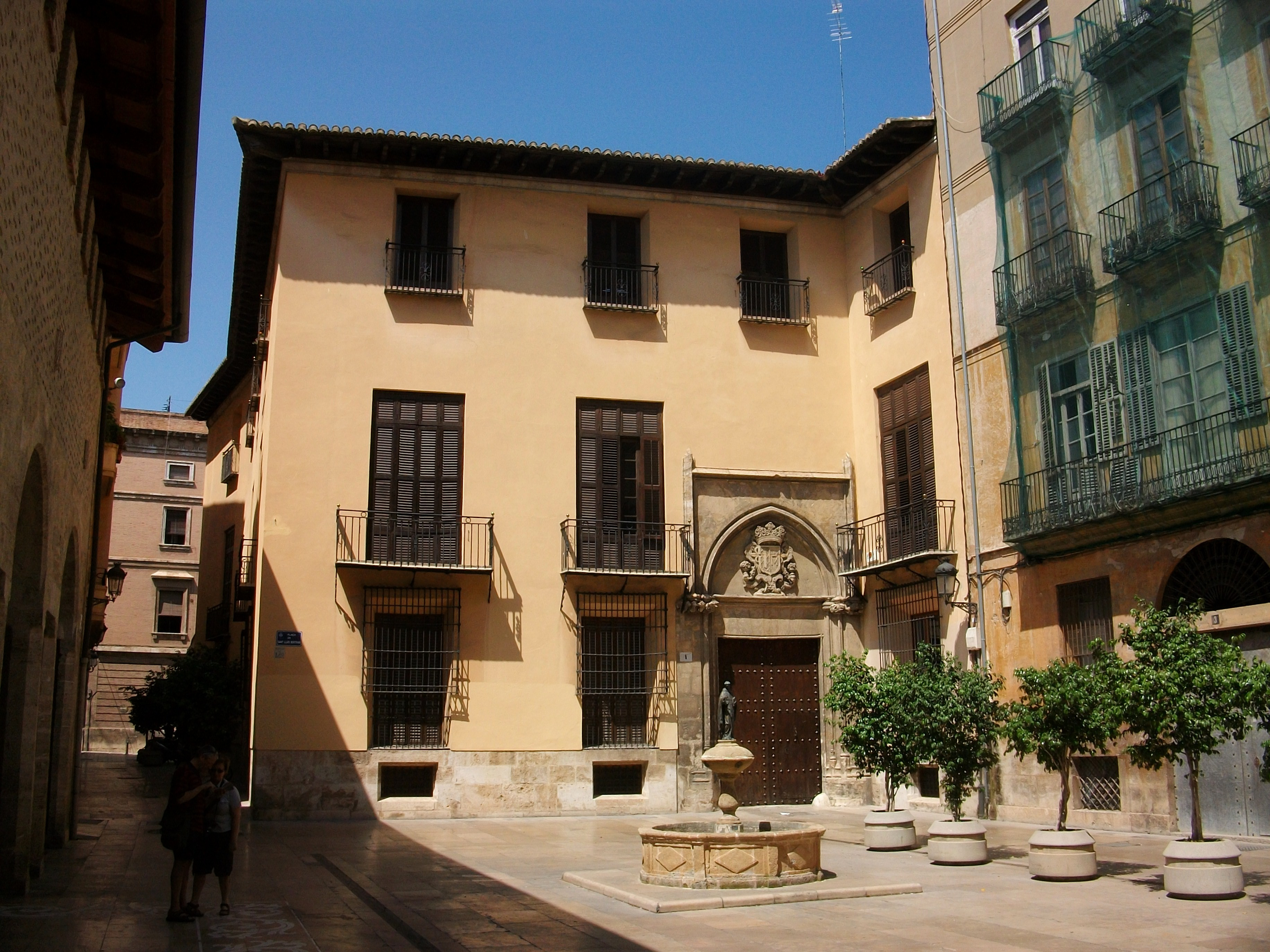
Escriva Palace, residence of Juan Diego Verdes-Montenegro (1690–1763) in Valencia

Both Fernando and Juan Diego Verdes-Montenegro joined the ranks of the high Nobility by marriage. In 1730 Juan Diego married Marianna Tarrega y Sanz de la LLosa, granddaughter of the Marquis of Malferit, whose lineage can be traced to the Reconquest of the Kingdom of Valencia from the Moor in the 13th century. Marianna was to be elevated to Marchioness of Benemejís by Charles III of Spain in 1762. In 1731 Juan Diego's elder brother, Fernando, married Jacinta de Gayoso Arias Ozores, daughter of the counts of Amarante, in Madrid, where they set up residence and had progeny.

== Genealogy ==
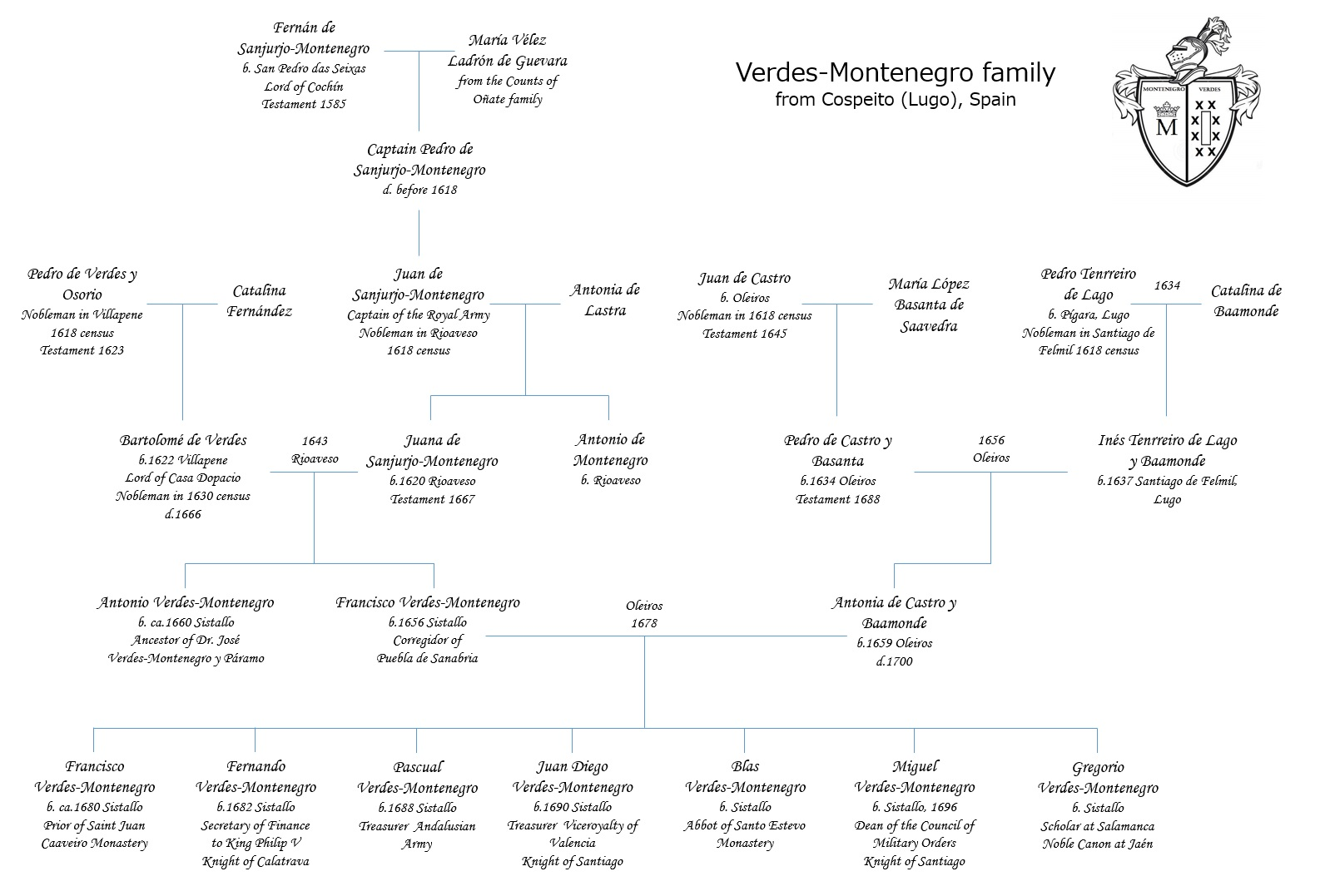
Family Tree of the Verdes-Montenegro family (Spain)

Since three of the Verdes-Montenegro brothers and some of their male descendants joined the Spanish military orders, there is accurate information available concerning their ancestors. According to the procedures set up by the Council of the Military Orders, the examination of a candidature to join any of the Orders entailed the appointment of a number of Informantes (informers) who travelled to the places of origin of the candidate's ancestors in order to take witnesses' depositions and check out primary documentary sources such as birth and marriage certificates, testaments and census registers. As a result, the genealogy of the Verdes-Montenegro family has been well established.

The Verdes-Montenegro and related lineages were hidalgos de sangre, that is to say, members of the lower stratum of the nobility who were of noble descent by blood and not by privilege. They were exempted from paying taxes, usually owned some land and properties, and displayed a coat of arms in their residences' facades as well as in their burials.

By the early 19th century, the Verdes-Montenegro family was divided in two main branches, the descendants of Fernando Verdes-Montenegro, whose lineage thrived in Madrid, and those of Juan Diego Verdes-Montenegro who initially lived in Valencia. Doctor José Verdes-Montenegro y Paramo (1866–1942) and José Verdes-Montenegro y Montoro (1865–1939), two prominent Spanish figures of this name, do not belong to these branches though.

== Coat of Arms ==
The principal seats of the Verdes-Montenegro family were the Casa Do Pacio, the Pazo de Sistallo, both in Cospeito, Lugo, and the Escrivà Palace in Valencia. In each of these houses, a carved-in-stone coat of arms of the Verdes-Montenegro family was exhibited on the facade. As still seen today, it combines the former coats of arms of the Verdes and the Montenegro lineages in a shield divided in two halves. On the left a sash surrounded by eight crosses (salteries) -arms of the Verdes family- and on the right the crowned capital M of the Montenegro lineage. On the facade of the Escrivà Palace, residence of Juan Diego Verdes-Montenegro and his wife, the Marchioness of Benemejis, in Valencia, the heraldic achievement also included a Grandee of Spain coronet on top of the shield.

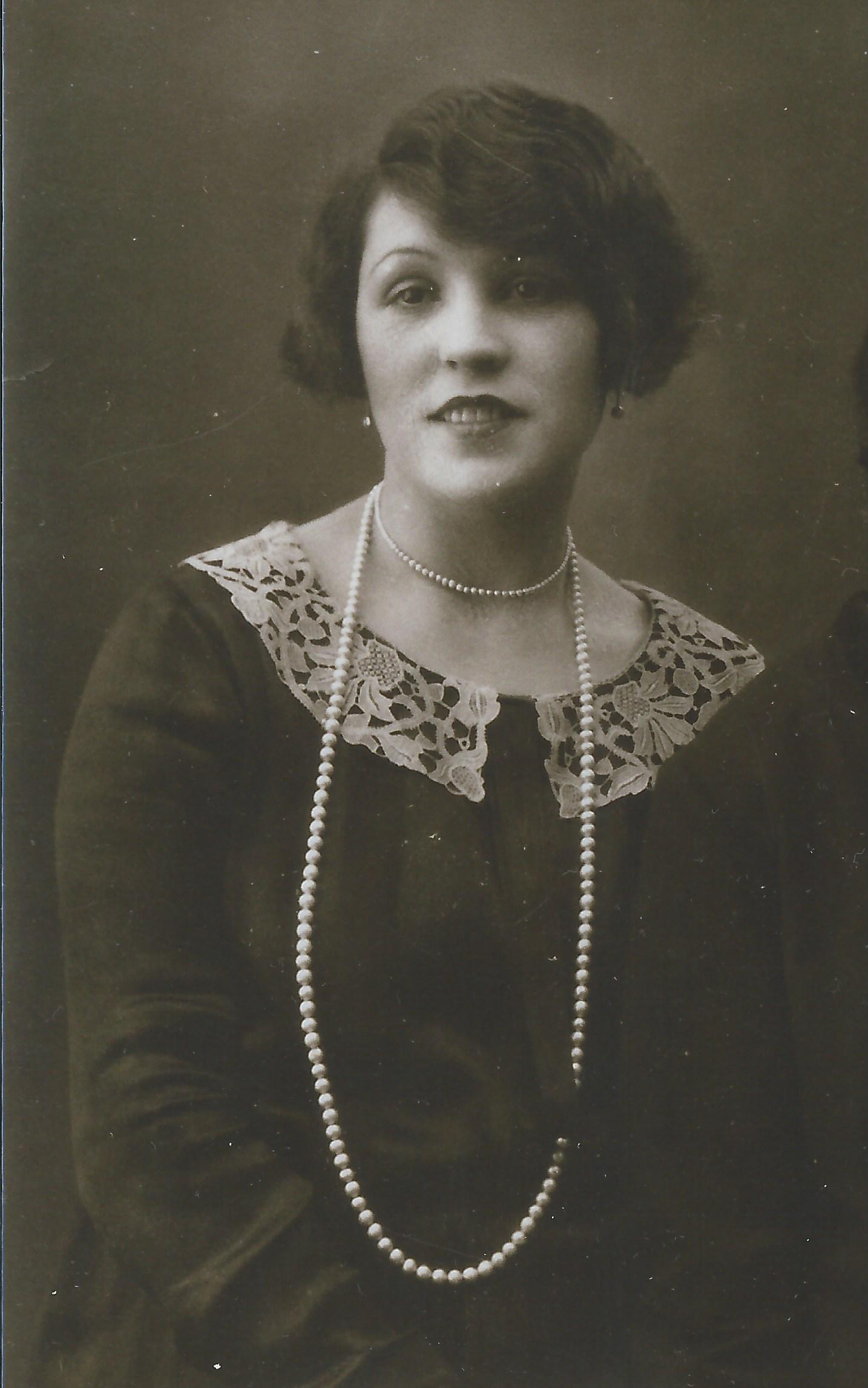
Emilia Verdes-Montenegro, 4th great-granddaughter of Juan Diego Verdes-Montenegro and Mariana Tárrega y Sanz de la Llosa, Marchioness of Benemejís
