= V Televisión =

Spanish commercial television channel

- Country: Spain
- Broadcast area: Galicia
- Headquarters: Polígono de Sabón, A Coruña

Programming
- Languages: Spanish, Galician
- Picture format: 16:9

Ownership
- Owner: Corporación Voz de Galicia
- Key people: Lois Blanco

History
- Launched: 29 May 2010
- Closed: 1 January 2018

Links
- Website: www.vtelevision.es

Availability

Terrestrial
- Digital: A Coruña: Channel 61; Santiago: Channel 40; Lugo: Channel 59; Ourense: Channel 62; Pontevedra: Channel 58

V Televisión was a Spanish commercial television channel owned by the Corporación Voz de Galicia. The channel was launched on 29 May 2010 The channel broadcast in the two languages of Galicia, Galician and Spanish.
