= A Fonsagrada (comarca) =

Coordinates: 43.1167°N 7.06667°W

- Comarca
- Flag Coat of arms
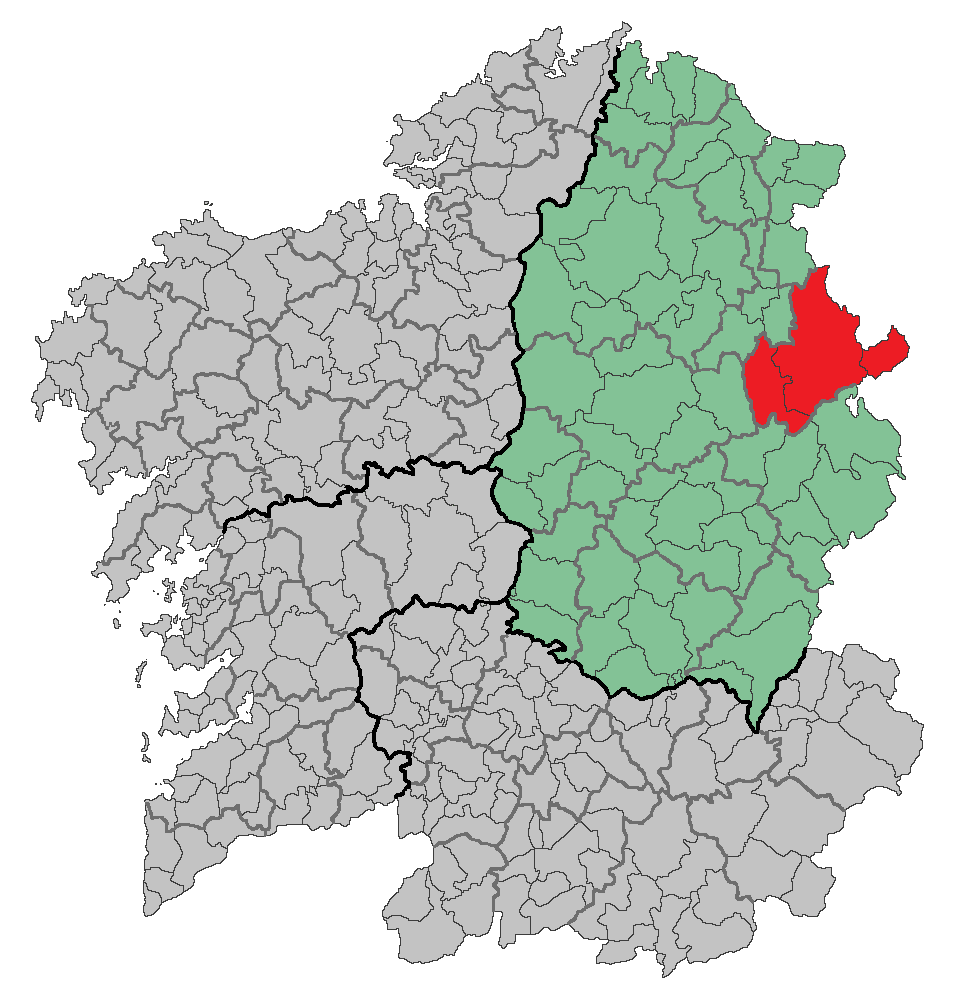
- Country: Spain
- Autonomous community: Galicia
- Province: Lugo
- Capital: A Fonsagrada
- Municipalities: List: Baleira, A Fonsagrada, Negueira de Muñiz
- Time zone: UTC+1 (CET)
  - Summer (DST): UTC+2 (CEST)

A Fonsagrada is a comarca in the Galician Province of Lugo. The overall population of this local region is 4,921 (2019).

== Municipalities ==
Baleira, A Fonsagrada and Negueira de Muñiz.
