= Terra Chá =

Coordinates: 43.2667°N 7.63333°W

A Terra Chá
- Comarca
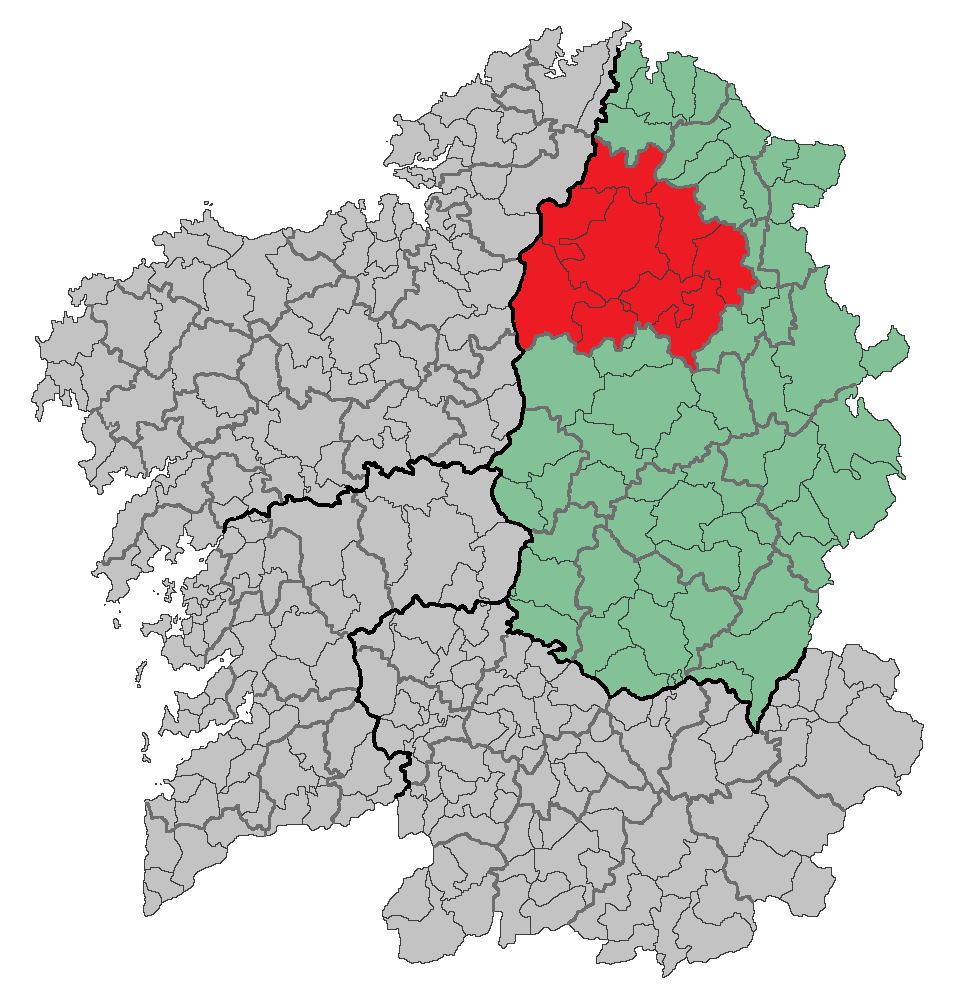
- Country: Spain
- Autonomous community: Galicia
- Province: Lugo
- Capital: Vilalba
- Municipalities: List: Abadín, Begonte, Castro de Rei, Cospeito, Guitiriz, Muras, A Pastoriza, Vilalba, Xermade

Area
  - Total: 1,822.75 km^{2} (703.77 sq mi)

Population
  - Total: 47,697
  - Density: 26.168/km^{2} (67.774/sq mi)
- Demonym: chairego
- Time zone: UTC+1 (CET)
  - Summer (DST): UTC+2 (CEST)

A Terra Chá is a comarca of Galicia, in the Province of Lugo. The overall population of this local region is 47,697 (2005). The regional capital and major population lies in Vilalba.

A Terra Chá is in the northern interior of the province Lugo.

It is the largest region of Galicia at 1,822.75 km ² and has 47,697 inhabitants

Manuel María, one of their famous poets, wrote a poem in 1954 entitled Terra Chá.

== Geography ==
The landscape of this plain combines knolls crowned by forts with agricultural plains and grasslands, important lagoons like the ones in Cospeito or Caque and over a hundred rivers and streams that run through the region. Its average height is 400 meters.

Two mountain ranges named Serra da Cova da Serpe and Serra da Loba (700–800 meters) set the limits with the province of A Coruña, while in the north, the mountains of A Carba, Xistral and Toxiza interpose marinas, while reaching the highest altitudes in the county up to 1,000 m.

== Municipalities ==
The municipalities of Terra Chá are Abadín, Begonte, Castro de Rei, Cospeito, Guitiriz, Muras, A Pastoriza, Vilalba and Xermade.

== Local economy ==
Galicia is by far the most important milk producing region of Spain. The Terra Chá Region of Galicia produces about 16% of the total amount of milk produced in Galicia. That means that the Terra Chá Region is one of the most important milk producing regions of Europe.
