= Rábade =

- Municipality
- San Vicenzo de Rábade
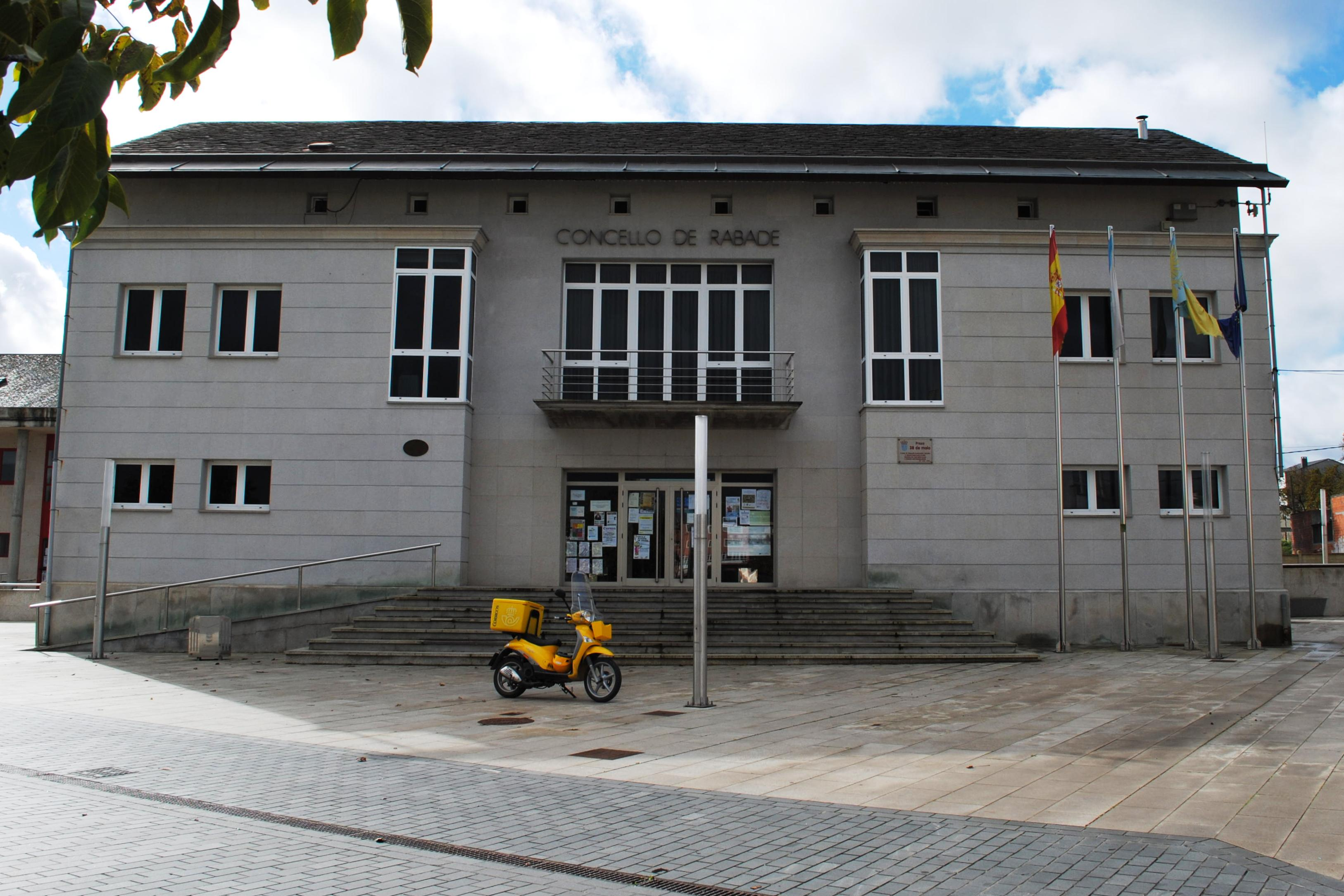

- Flag Coat of arms

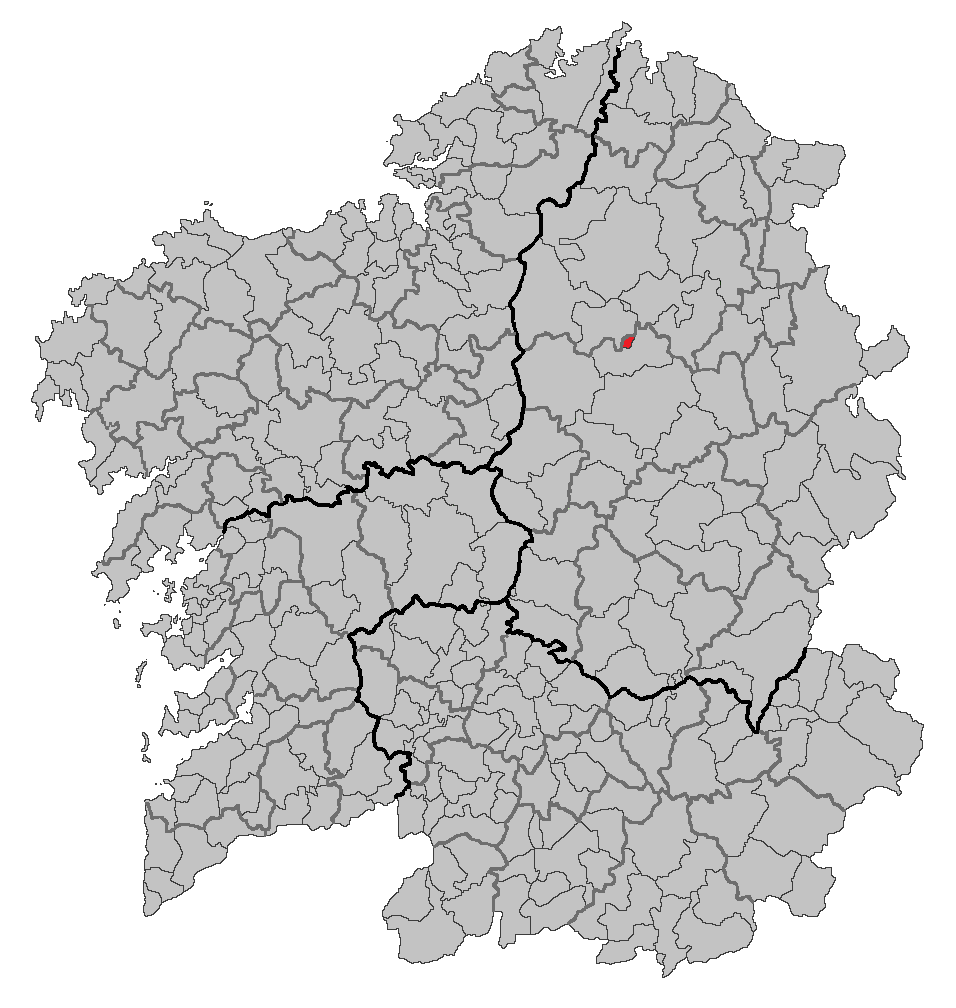
- Situation of Rábade within Galicia
- Coordinates: 43.122°N 7.623°W
- Country: Spain
- Autonomous Community: Galicia
- Province: Lugo
- Comarca: Lugo
- Parroquia: List: Rábade

Government
  - Type: Concello
  - Mayor: Francisco Xosé Fernández Montes

Area
  - Total: 5.2 km^{2} (2.0 sq mi)

Population (2025-01-01)
  - Total: 1,514
  - Density: 290/km^{2} (750/sq mi)
- Time zone: CET (GMT +1)
  - Summer (DST): CEST (GMT +2)
- Post code: 27370
- Area code: +34 982
- Website: http://www.rabade.org

Rábade, also known as San Vicenzo de Rábade, is a town and in the province of Lugo, and the smallest municipality in Galicia, northwestern Spain. It belongs to the comarca of Lugo. Rábade has a population of about 1500 and an area of 5.2 km^{2}. It is at an altitude of 400 meters.

Until 28 May 1925 Rábade was part of Begonte.

The town's name is of Arabic origin.

Rábade holds market days on the 2nd and 22nd of every month and on those days you can eat a traditional dish: octopus. It has celebrations on 22 and 23 January and 15 August. The Copa Miño de Piragüismo is a local tourist attraction.
