= Baleira =

- Municipality
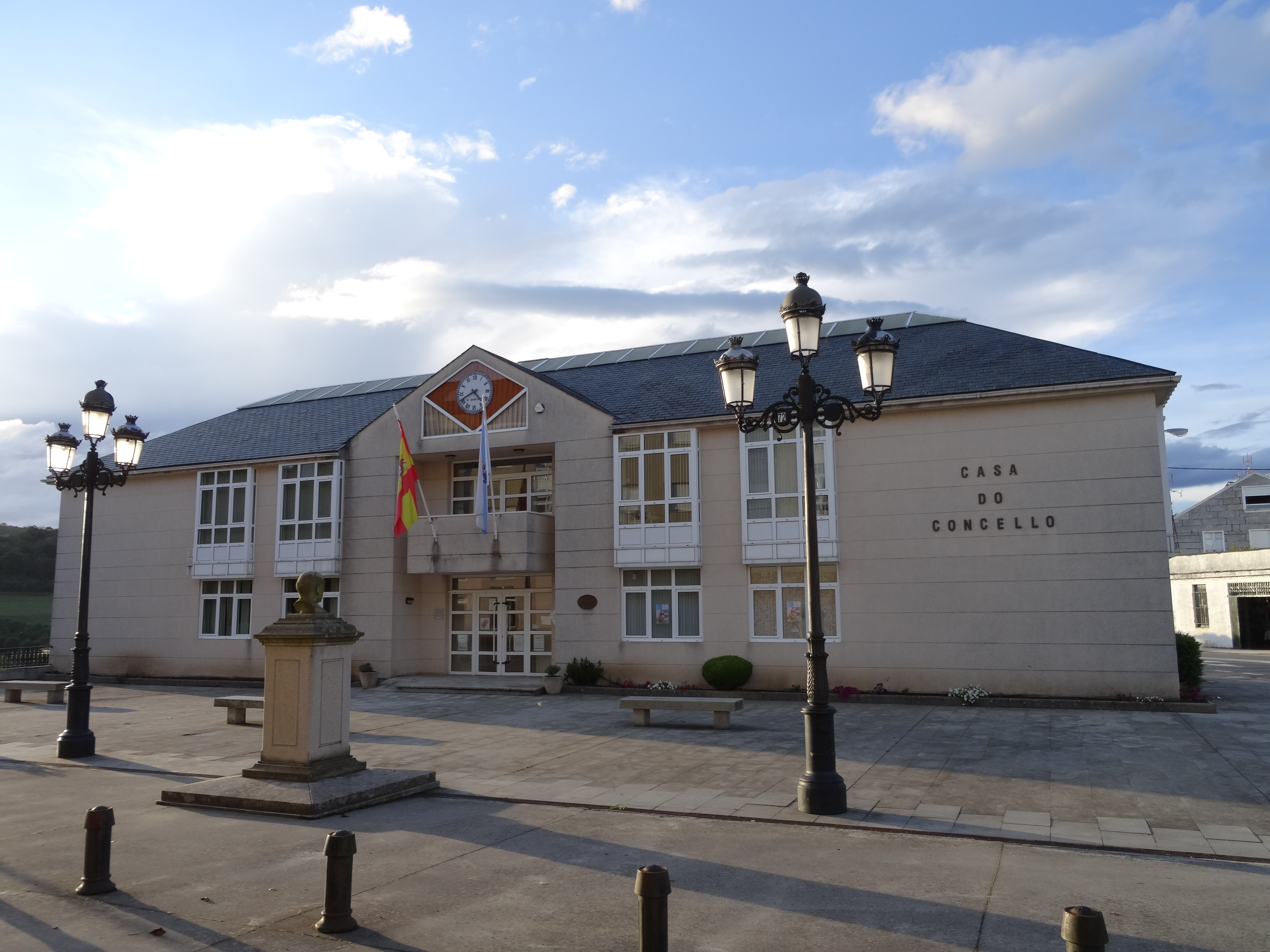

- Coat of arms

- Location within Spain Location within Galicia Location within Province of Lugo
- Coordinates: 43°0′6″N 7°14′21″W
- Country: Spain
- Autonomous community: Galicia
- Province: Lugo
- Comarca: A Fonsagrada

Area
  - Total: 168.2 km^{2} (64.9 sq mi)
- Elevation: 1,049 m (3,442 ft)

Population (2025-01-01)
  - Total: 1,093
  - Density: 6.498/km^{2} (16.83/sq mi)
- Website: concellodebaleira.es

Baleira is a municipality in the province of Lugo, in the autonomous community of Galicia, Spain. In 2002, 1,845 people lived in Baleira. It belongs to the comarca of Fonsagrada. The capital of the municipality is O Cádavo, a name often given by extension to the entire municipality. Its population in 2009 was 1,584 people according to the municipal register of inhabitants.

It is located on the Camino Primitivo path of the Camino de Santiago.

== Economy ==
Baleira has always lived on livestock and agriculture. Livestock is a basic pillar of the economy of the municipality for different areas. In the valley area of Eo there are predominantly dairy cows so this area has an important part in milk production in the province of Lugo. In the most mountainous area of the municipality, the most usual Galician cow is called the blonde or la llamada rubia Gallega in Spanish. This area specializes in the production of meat and although there are very few sheep they are also important to the economy. With respect to agriculture, this is usually subsistence. Families practice agriculture for their own benefit, with no large holdings of said activity.

== Civil parishes ==
- A Braña (San Miguel)
- Córneas (Santiago)
- Cubilledo (Santiago)
- A Degolada (San Lourenzo)
- A Esperela (San Pedro)
- A Fontaneira (Santiago)
- Fonteo (Santa María)
- A Lastra (San Xoán)
- Librán (Santa Mariña)
- Martín (Santiago)
- Pousada (San Lourenzo)
- Retizós (Santa María Madanela)

== Famous persons ==
- Manuel Portela Nogueira (lawyer)

== See also ==
- List of municipalities in Lugo
