= Muras, Galicia =

Muras
- Municipality
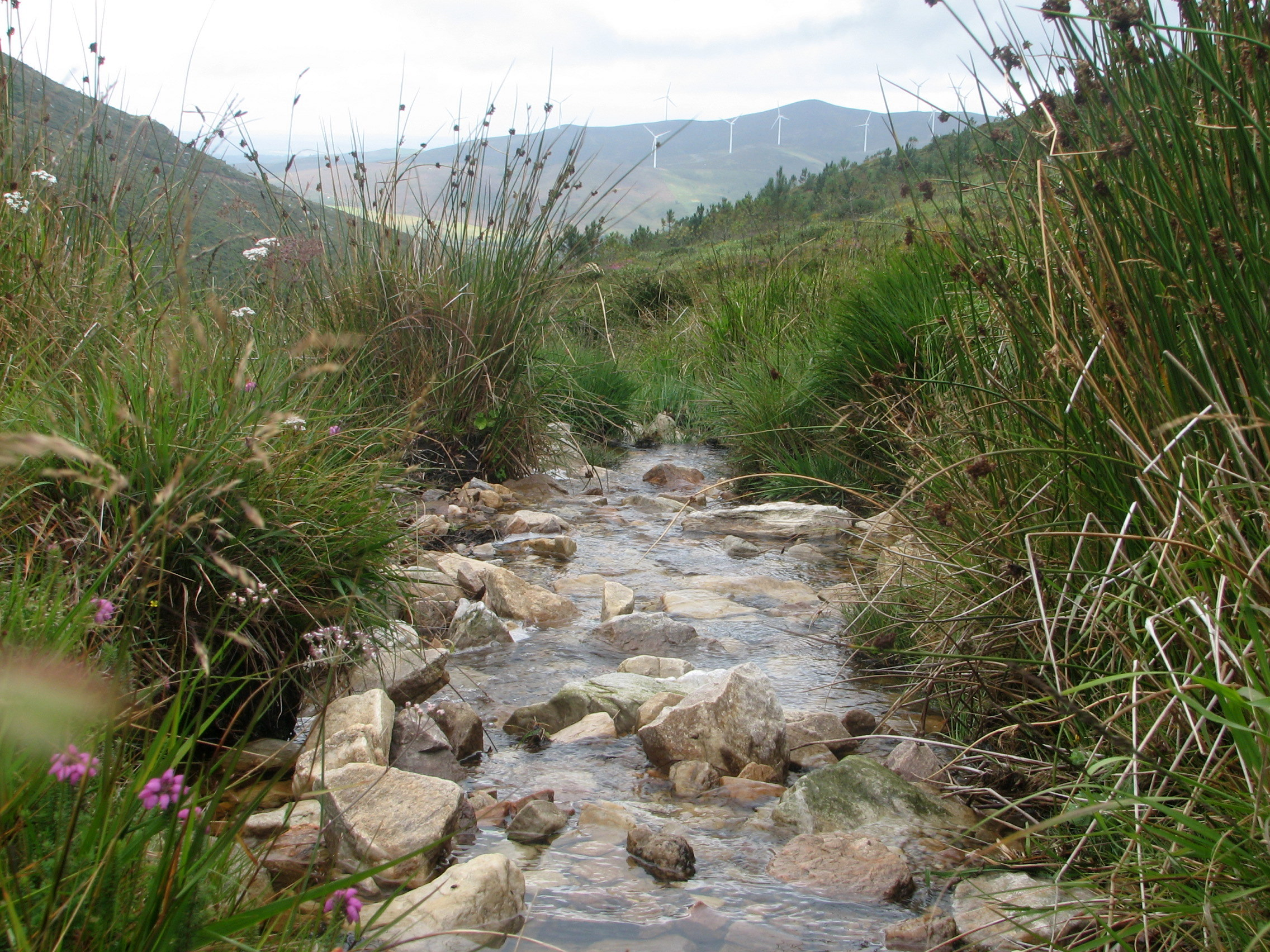

- Coat of arms

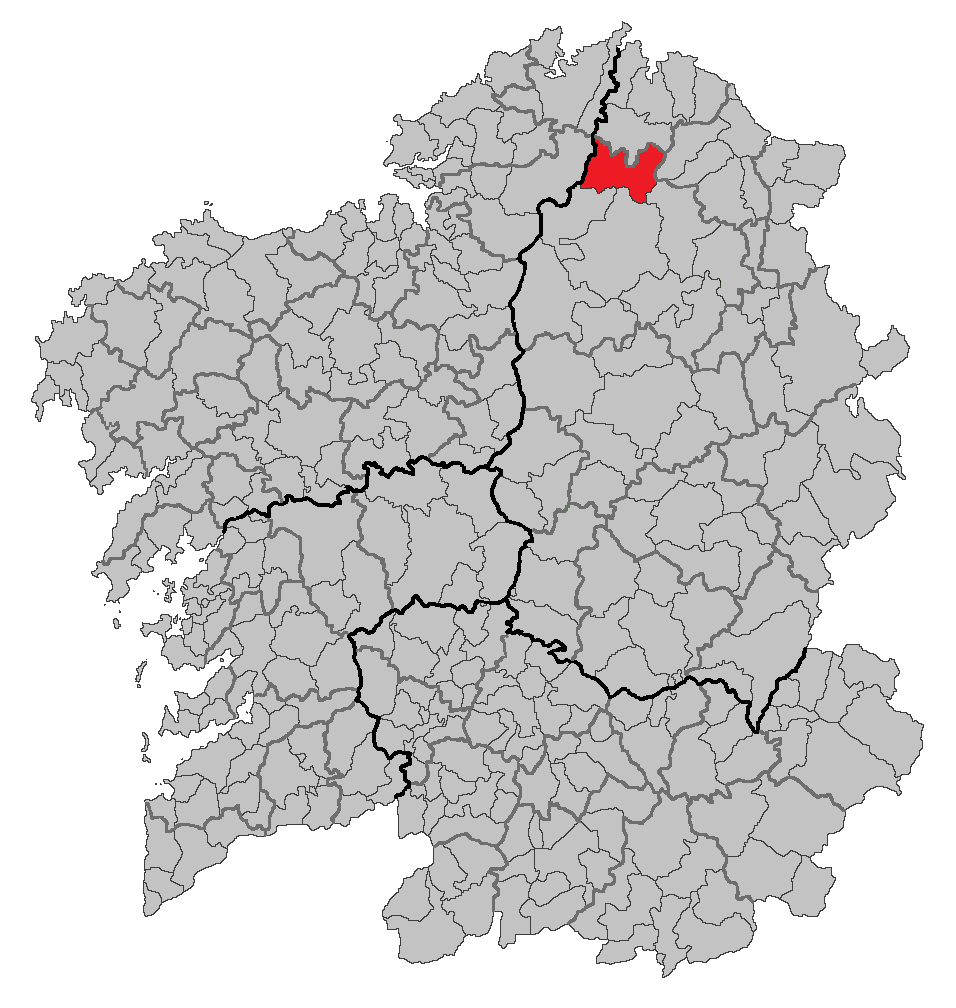

- Location in Spain
- Coordinates: 43°27′N 7°43′W
- Country: Spain
- Autonomous community: Galicia
- Province: Lugo
- Comarca: Terra Chá

Government
  - Alcalde: Manuel Requeijo (2024) (BNG)

Area
  - Total: 163.81 km^{2} (63.25 sq mi)

Population (2024)
  - Total: 600
  - Density: 3.7/km^{2} (9.5/sq mi)
- Demonym: Murensán
- Time zone: UTC+1 (CET)
  - Summer (DST): UTC+2 (CEST)
- Postal code: 27033
- Dialing code: 982
- Website: http://muras.gal/

Muras is a municipality in the province of Lugo, part of the autonomous community of Galicia, in northwestern Spain. Muras belongs to the comarca of Terra Chá.
