= Xermade =

Coordinates: 43°18′N 7°41′W

- Municipality
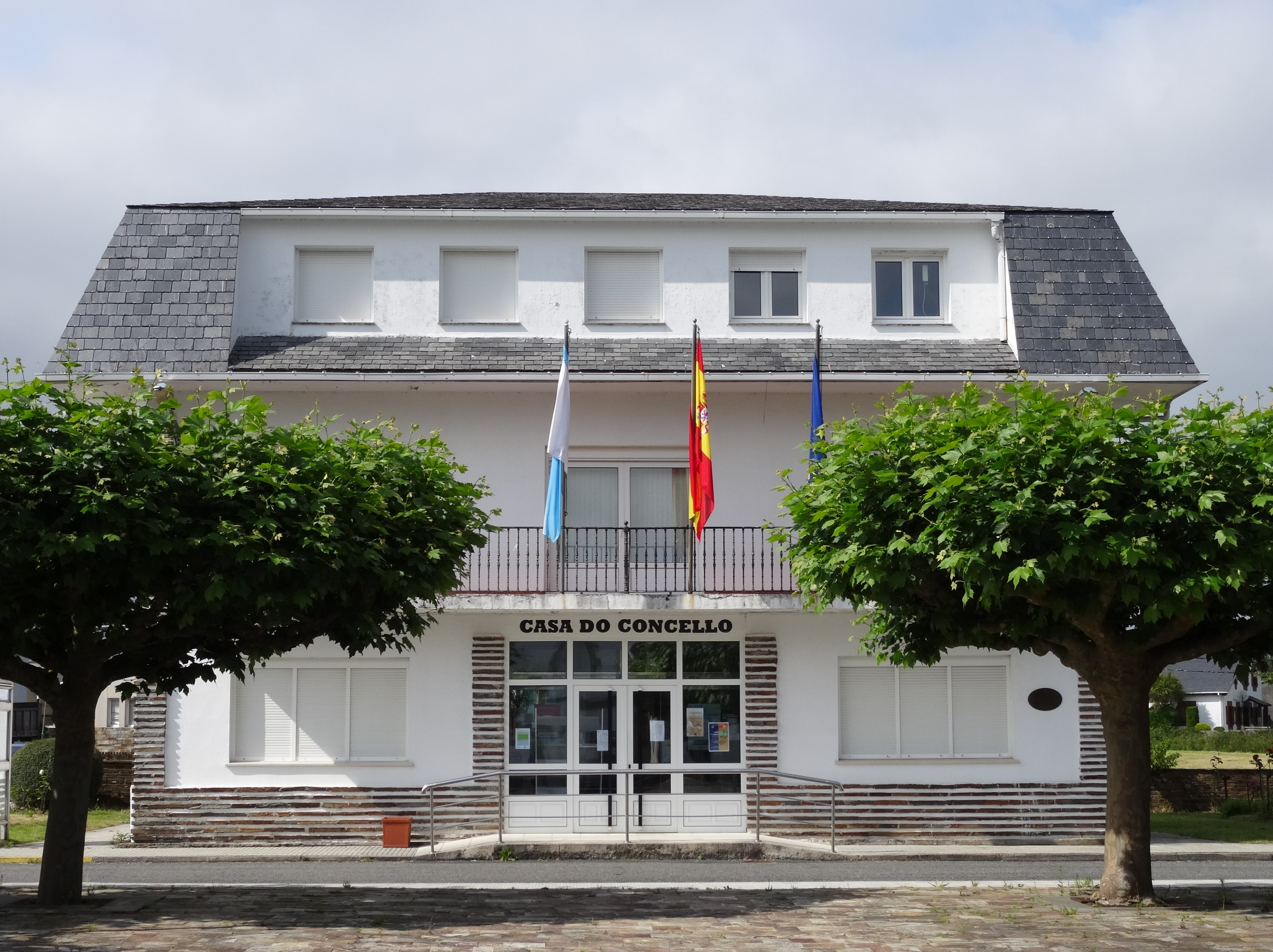
- Town hall.

- Coat of arms

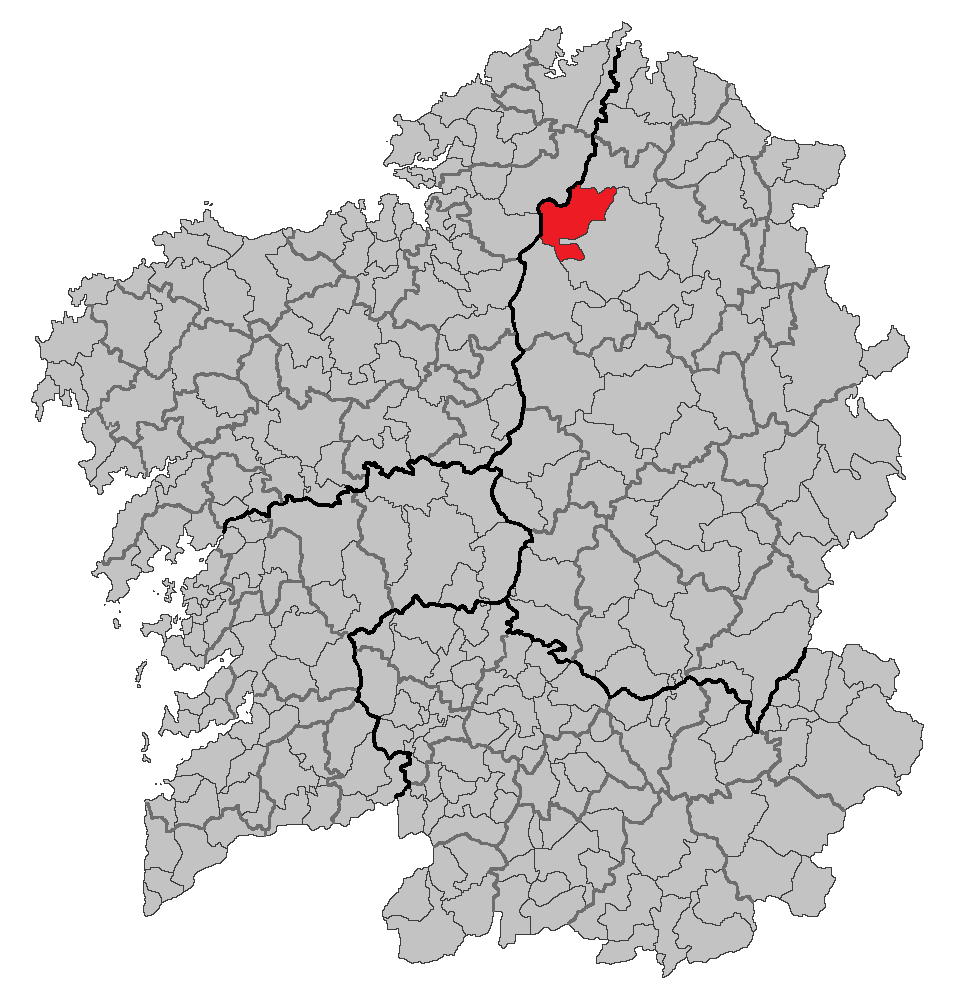
- Location of Xermade

- Location in Spain
- Country: Spain
- Autonomous community: Galicia
- Province: Lugo
- Comarca: Terra Chá

Government
  - Alcalde: Roberto García Pernas (PSdeG)

Population (2025-01-01)
  - Total: 1,665
- Demonym(s): xermadés, -a
- Time zone: UTC+1 (CET)
  - Summer (DST): UTC+2 (CEST)
- Postal code: 2783...
- Website: Official website

Xermade, is a municipality in the province of Lugo, in the autonomous community of Galicia, northwestern Spain. It belongs to the comarca of Terra Chá.

== Parishes ==
- Burgás (Santa Baia)
- Cabreiros (Santa Mariña)
- Candamil (San Miguel)
- Cazás (San Xulián)
- Lousada (Santo André)
- Miraz (San Pedro)
- Momán (San Mamede)
- Piñeiro (San Martiño)
- Roupar (San Pedro Fiz)
- Xermade (Santa María)
