= A Pastoriza =

Coordinates: 43°18′1.49″N 7°21′4.42″W

- Municipality
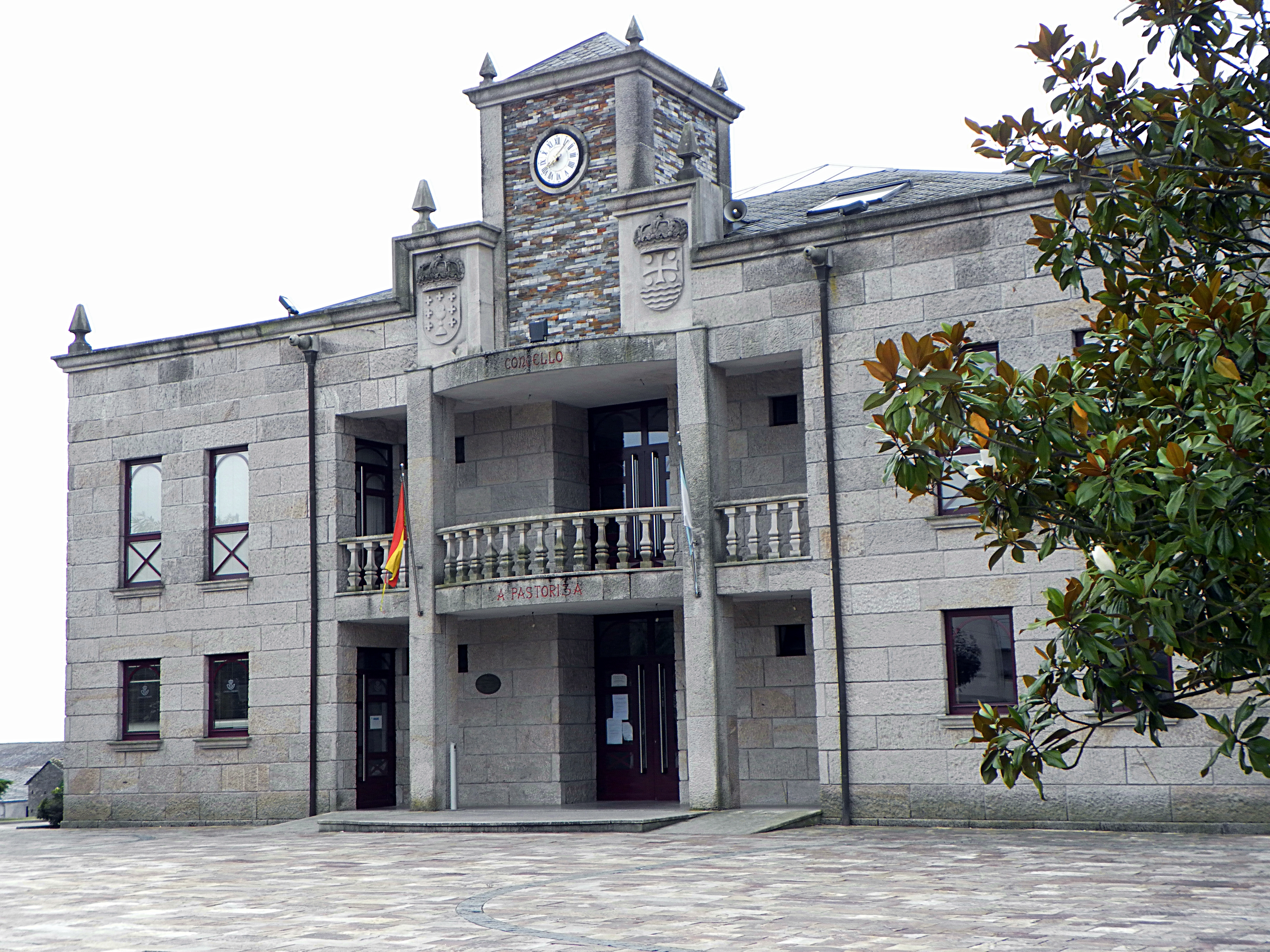
- Town hall.

- Coat of arms

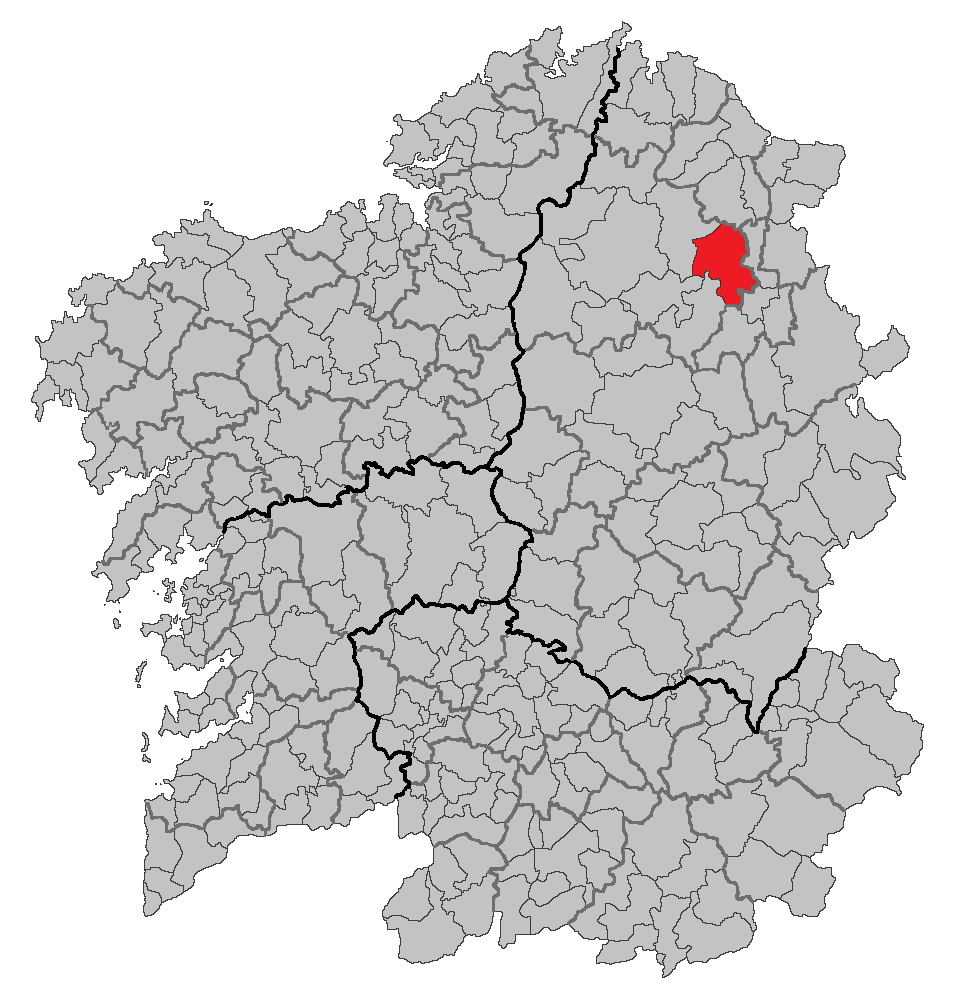
- Location of A Pastoriza

- Location in Spain
- Country: Spain
- Autonomous community: Galicia
- Province: Lugo
- Comarca: Terra Chá

Government
  - Alcalde: Primitivo Iglesias Sierra (PSdeG)

Population (2025-01-01)
  - Total: 2,794
- Demonyms: pastoricense, pastoricego, -a
- Time zone: UTC+1 (CET)
  - Summer (DST): UTC+2 (CEST)
- Postal code: 27287
- Website: Official website

A Pastoriza is a municipality in the province of Lugo, in the autonomous community of Galicia, Spain, and belongs to the comarca of Terra Chá. It has a population of 3,911 (Spanish 2003 Census) and an area of 175 km^{2}. The Miño River, the most important river in Galicia, as well as one of the most plentiful rivers of Spain, begins here.

== Parishes ==
- A Aguarda (San Martiño)
- Álvare (Santa María)
- Baltar (San Pedro Fiz)
- Bretoña (Santa María)
- Cadavedo (San Bartolomeu)

== Monuments ==
The artistic heritage of A Pastoriza is noted for its many stone crosses, chapels and churches that make up the rural municipality. The Temple of Breton is considered the cradle of the diocese of Mondoñedo-Ferrol because it was the ancient Britoniensis episcopal until the eighth century. Several authors defend the existence of a British Christian society in this area. It is believed that it was they who founded the Breton bishopric, Britonia.
