= Negueira de Muñiz =

- Municipality
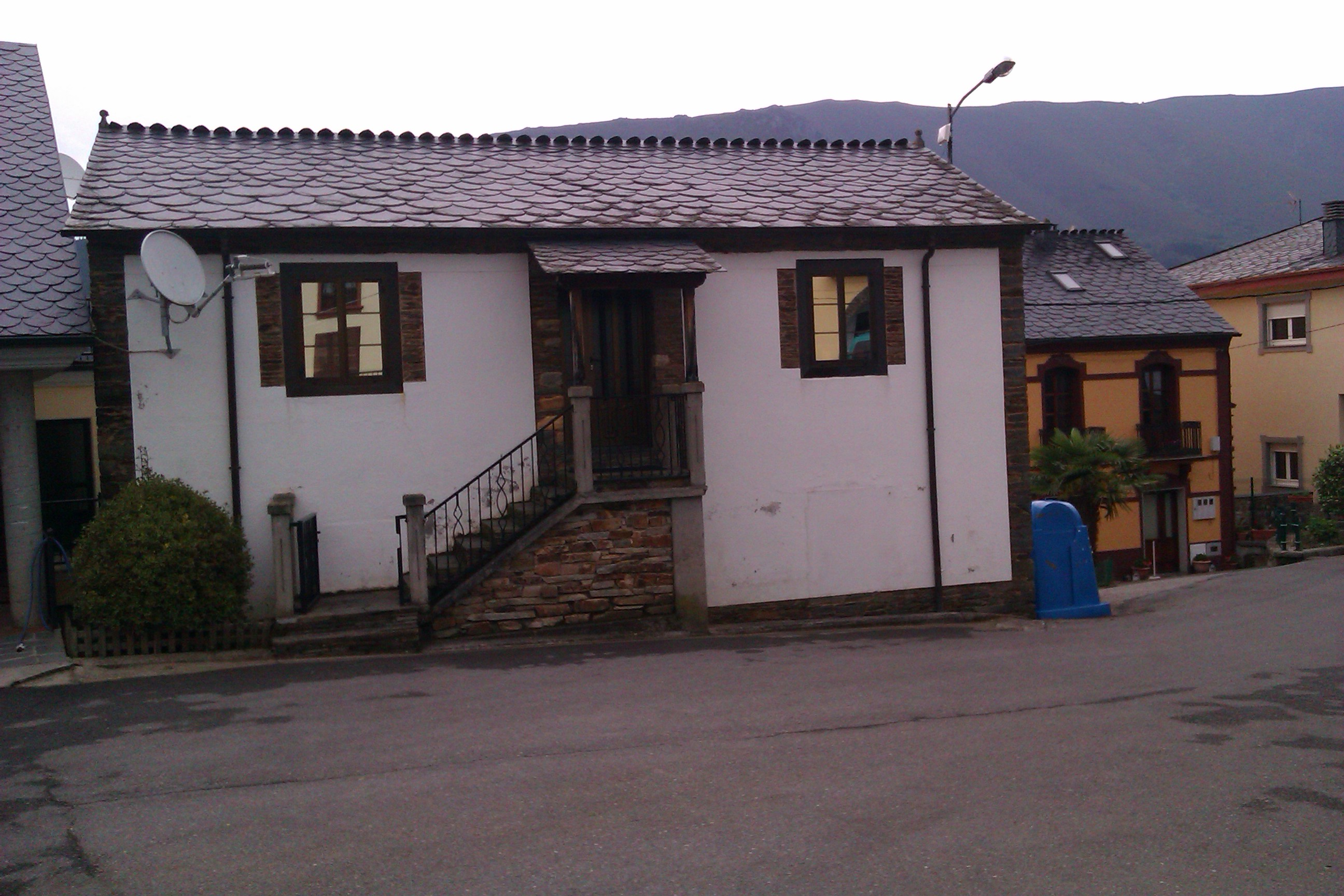
- Town hall.

- Coat of arms

- Location in Spain
- Coordinates: 43°8′N 6°54′W
- Country: Spain
- Autonomous community: Galicia
- Province: Lugo
- Comarca: Fonsagrada

Government
  - Mayor: José Manuel Braña Pereda (PSOE)

Area
  - Total: 72.26 km^{2} (27.90 sq mi)

Population (2025-01-01)
  - Total: 236
  - Density: 3.27/km^{2} (8.46/sq mi)
- Time zone: UTC+1 (CET)
  - Summer (DST): UTC+2 (CEST)
- Postal code: 27113

Negueira de Muñiz is a municipality in the province of Lugo, in the autonomous community of Galicia, northwestern Spain. It belongs to the comarca of A Fonsagrada. According to the IGE, it had a population of 218, making it the least populated town in Galicia (as of 2018).
