= Castro de Rei =

Coordinates: 43°12′N 7°41′W

- Municipality
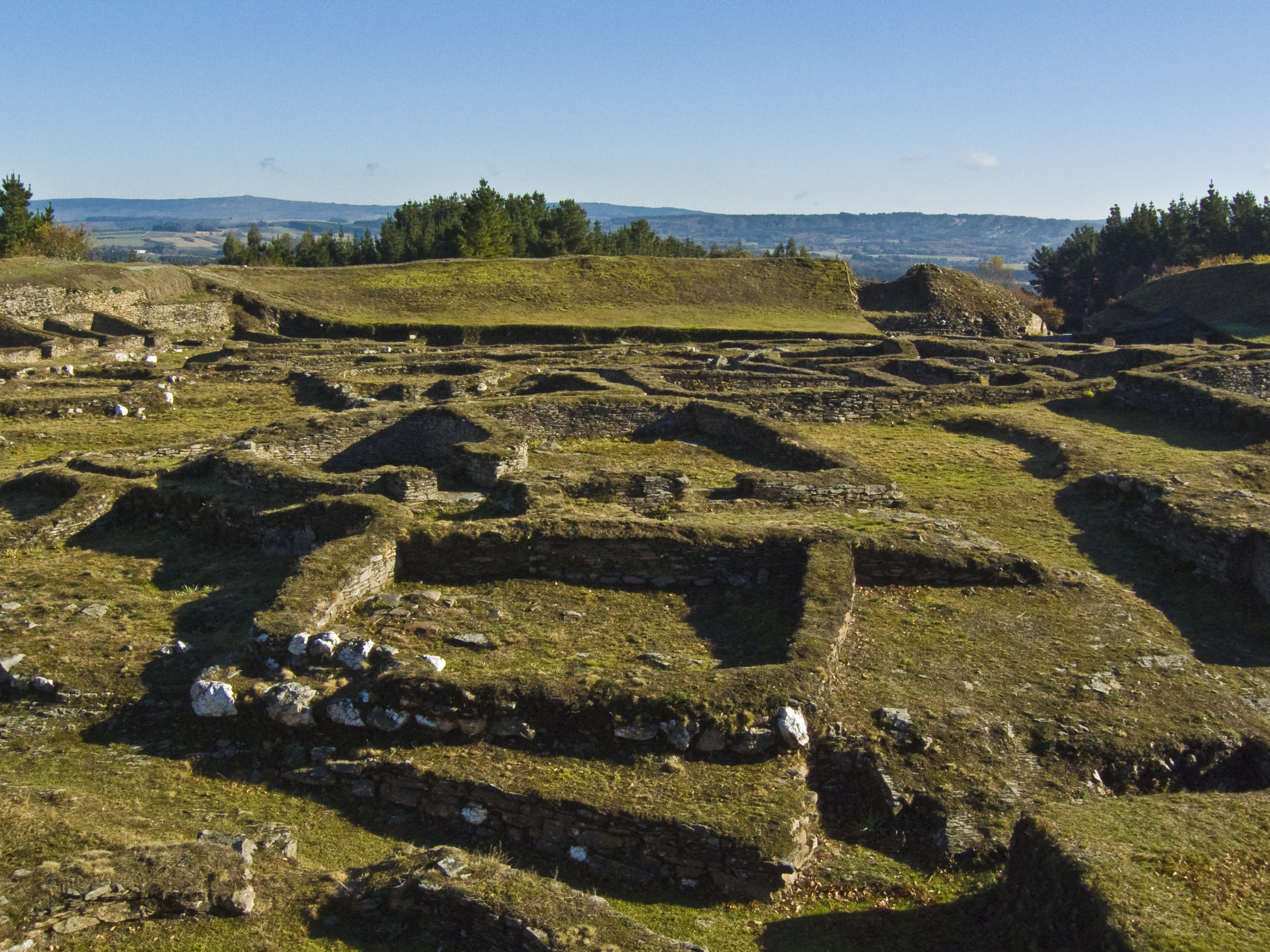
- Castro of Viladonga.

- Coat of arms

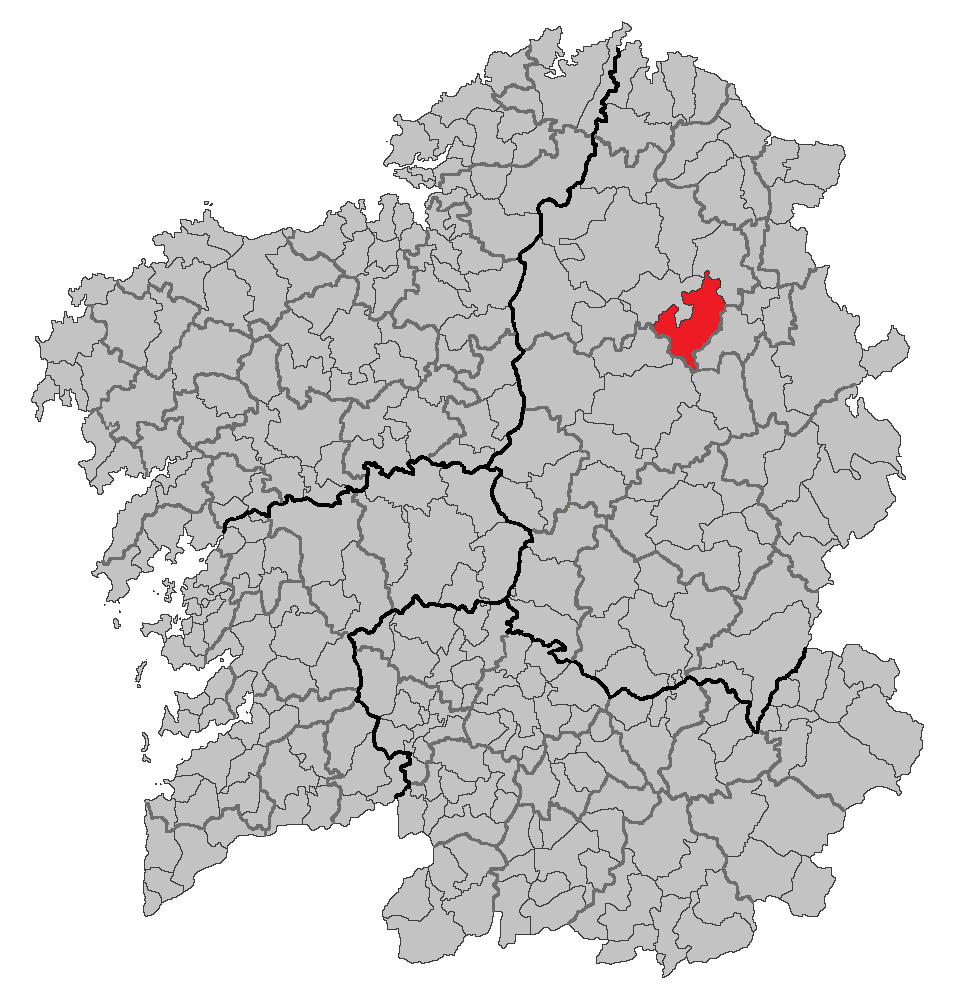
- Location of Castro de Rei

- Location in Spain
- Country: Spain
- Autonomous community: Galicia
- Province: Lugo
- Comarca: Terra Chá

Government
  - Alcalde: Francisco Javier Balado Teijeiro (PPdeG)

Population (2025-01-01)
  - Total: 5,001
- Demonym(s): castrexo, -a
- Time zone: UTC+1 (CET)
  - Summer (DST): UTC+2 (CEST)
- Postal code: 27250
- Website: Official website

Castro de Rei, is a municipality in the province of Lugo, in the autonomous community of Galicia, Spain. It belongs to the comarca of Terra Chá. The population in 2009 was 5,685 people according to INE.

== Demography ==
From a demographic standpoint, the whole region suffered the ravages of migration and demographic ageing, which also left indelible consequences in mountain parishes. However, Castro de Rei did not experience these fluctuations in other municipalities in Lugo. Throughout the century the population stood at about six or seven thousand, making the effective population loss not as alarming as in the mountain municipalities of Lugo. Castro de Rei has 25 civil parishes. It has a population density of 32.7 inhabitants/km^{2}.

== Geography ==
Castro de Rei is located in the comarca of the Terra Cha. This factor determines the most of their socioeconomic characteristics. Its average altitude is between 400 and 500 meters. In the east the terrain becomes more rugged due to its proximity to the eastern mountains. The elevation of the Montes dos Millares is 620 meters and the Pedras Albas has an elevation of 619 meters Pedras Albas. The Minho river and several of its tributaries irrigate the lands. The Minho runs through the municipality and derives secondary manifolds, which are Azúmara, the Lea, and Anllo. Climatically, Castro de Rei has a temperate climate with abundant rainfall in the winter months. The region is characterized by its plains and its vast wetlands, home to waterfowl and large communities of amphibians. Associated with these wetlands appears a landscape mosaic, ecologically rich with color and an ample variety of habitats: grasslands, crops, forests, heath and rushes. The functional organization of the territory follows a monocentric structure with three main comarcas: Vilalba, Guitiriz and Castro de Rei. Castro de Rei has three mountain ranges:

- Os Arroxos
- O Condado
- Aguceira
- Abroiti
- Pedras Albas

== Civil parishes ==
- Ansemar (San Salvador)
- Azúmara (San Xoán)
- Balmonte (San Salvador)
- Bazar (San Pedro)
- Bendia (San Pedro)
- Castro de Rei (San Xoán)
- Coea (San Salvador)
- Duancos (Santa María)
- Duarría(Santiago)
- Dumpín(Santalla)
- Goberno (San Martiño)
- Loentia (Santo Estevo)
