= Pol, Lugo =

Pol
- Municipality
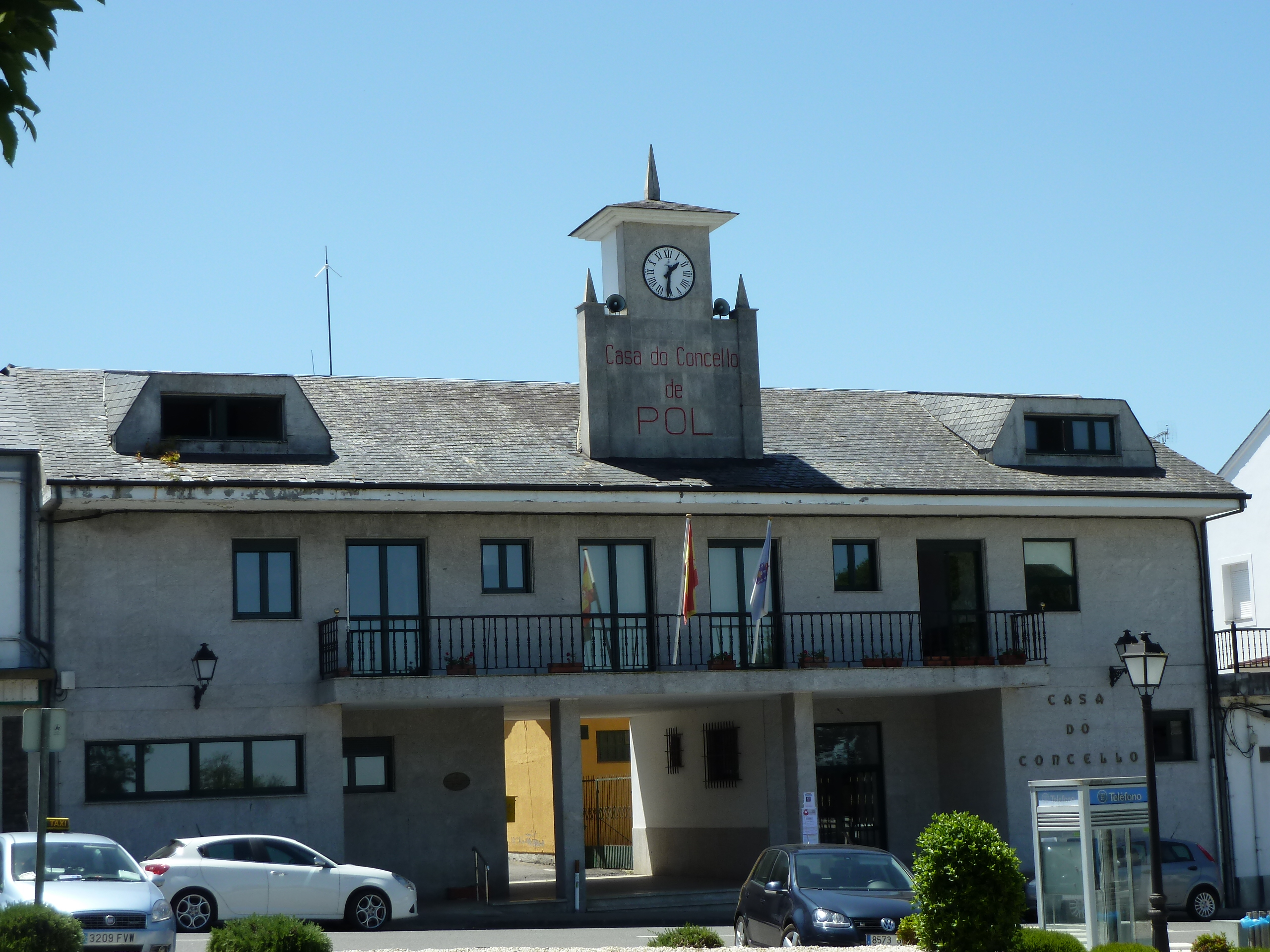

- Coat of arms

- Location in Spain.
- Coordinates: 43°21′49″N 7°28′30″W
- Country: Spain
- Autonomous community: Galicia
- Province: Lugo
- Comarca: Meira

Government
  - Mayor: Lino Rodríguez Ónega

Area
  - Total: 124.46 km^{2} (48.05 sq mi)

Population (2025-01-01)
  - Total: 1,550
  - Density: 12.5/km^{2} (32.3/sq mi)
- Demonym(s): polense, -a
- Time zone: UTC+1 (CET)
  - Summer (DST): UTC+2 (CET)
- Website: Official website

Pol is a municipality in the province of Lugo, in the autonomous community of Galicia, northwestern Spain. Its capital is Mosteiro.

== History ==
It has been historically linked to the arrival of Briton immigrants in Galicia during the Dark Ages period (see Bishop Maeloc and Britonia).
