= Guitiriz =

Coordinates: 43°10′55.31″N 7°53′43.33″W

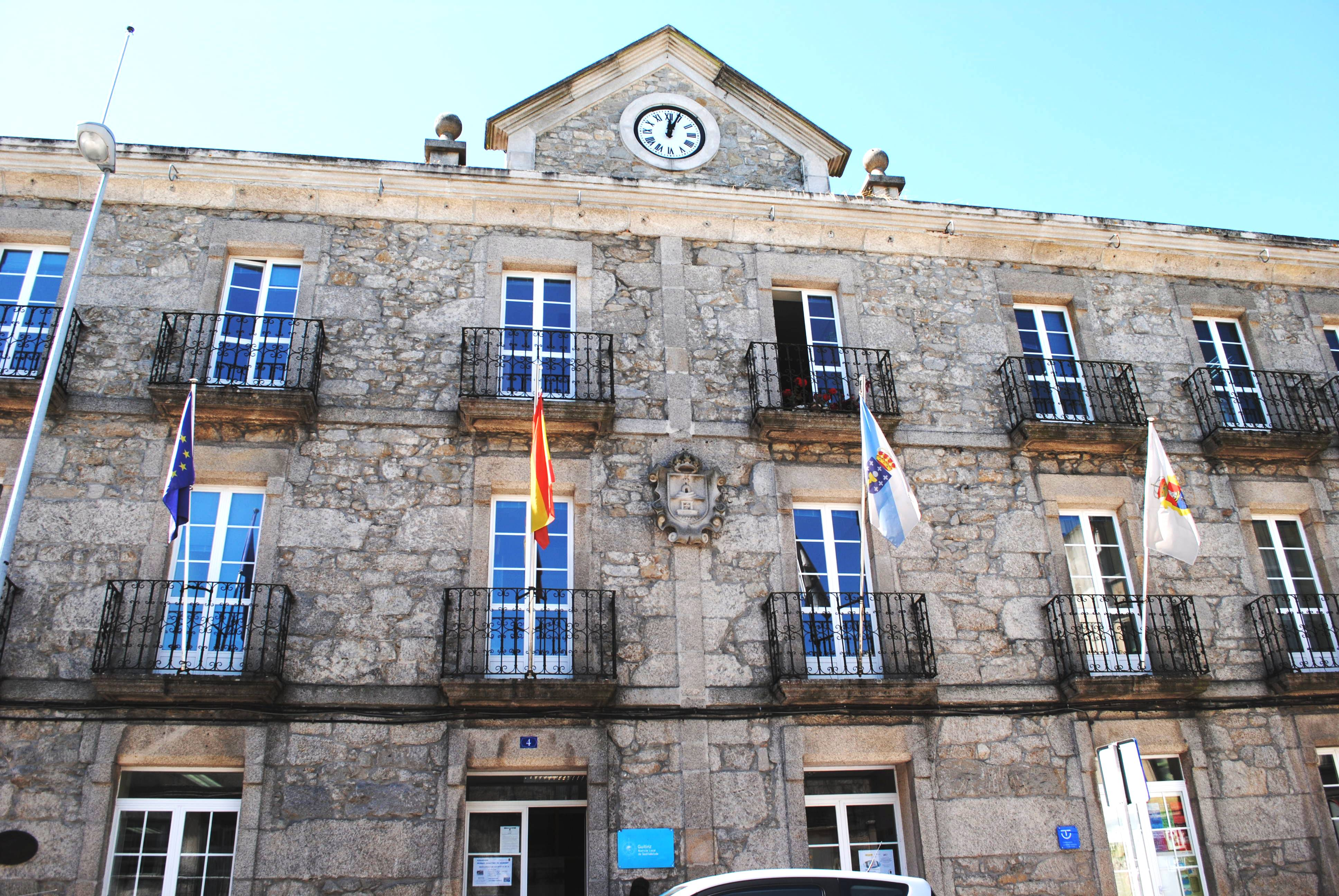
- Town hall.

- Coat of arms
- Nicknames: Guitiriz, Spa Town
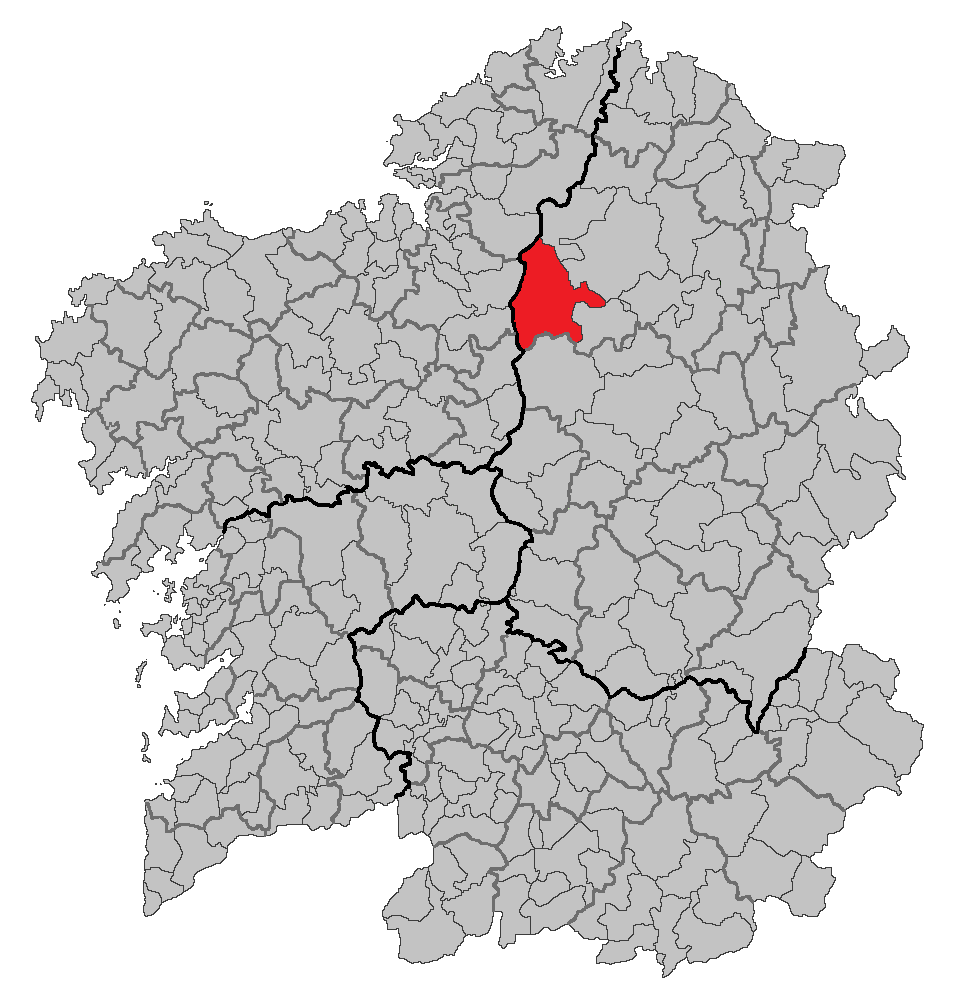
- Location of Guitiriz
- Parroquias: 13

Government
  - Alcalde (Mayor): Marisol Morandeira Morandeira

Population (2025-01-01)
  - Total: 5,180
- Time zone: UTC+1 (CET)
  - Summer (DST): UTC+2 (CET)

Guitiriz (Galician pronunciation: [ɡitiˈɾiθ]) is a municipality in the province of Lugo, in the autonomous community of Galicia, northwestern Spain. It belongs to the comarca of Terra Chá. It is known for its spa of mineral water. Prior to 1950, the town was known as Trasparga.

== Etymology ==
The name Guitiriz is of Germanic origin. It is derived from the name Witteric; a Suebi king who ruled Gallaecia, Hispania and Septimania. According to local legends, Witteric founded Guitiriz in the 6th century.

== Parishes ==
(also known as: "Parroquias")

1. Becín
2. Buriz
3. Labrada
4. Lagostelle
5. Mariz
6. As Negradas
7. Parga
8. Pedrafita
9. Pígara
10. Roca
11. Trasparga
12. Vilar
13. Vilares de Parga

== History and tourism ==
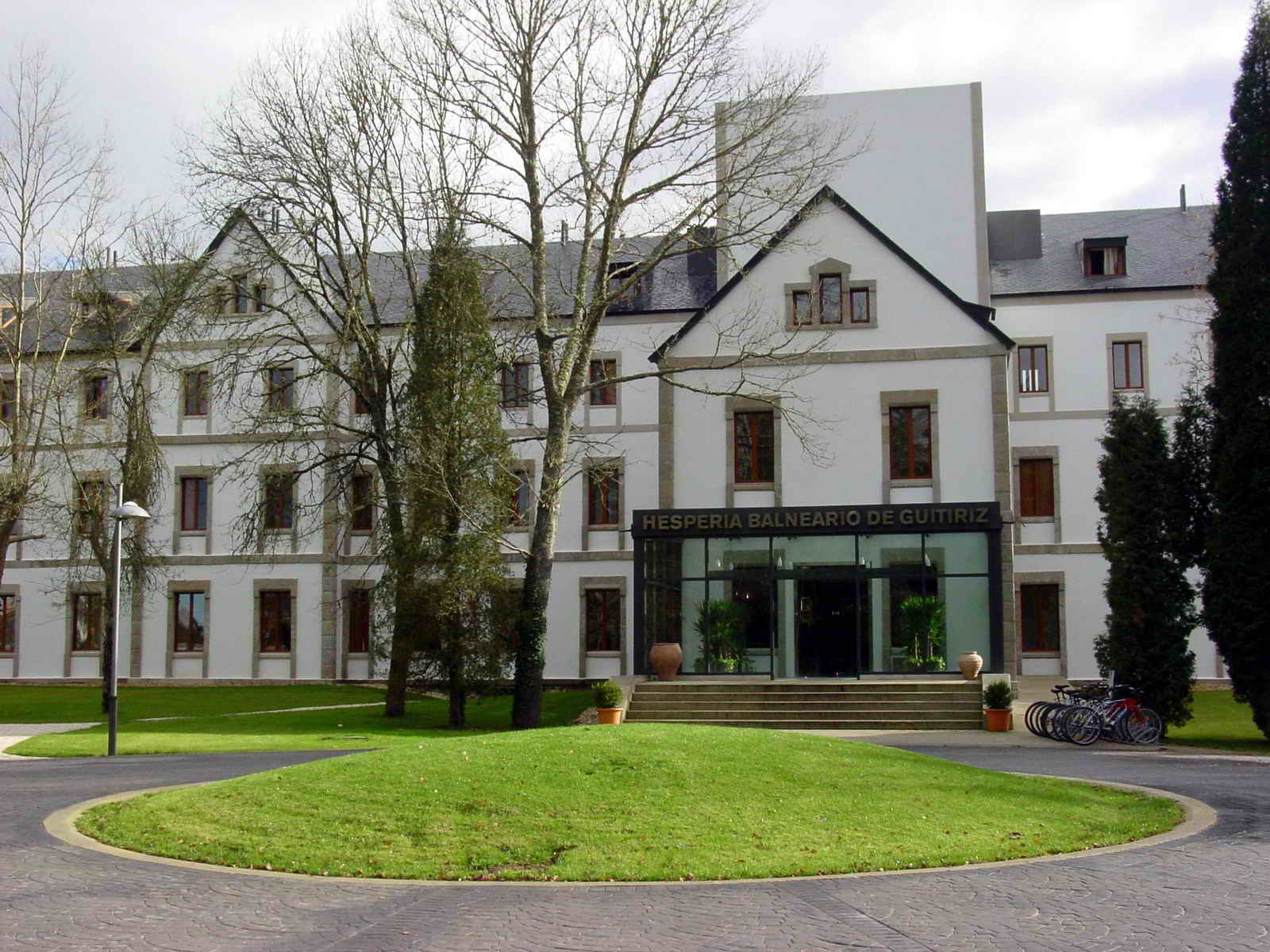
Entrance to the spa town of Guitiriz

Though the early settlers were of Celtic origin and the Romans knew about the therapeutic properties of the thermae, it was not till the arrival of the Suebi after the collapse of the Roman Empire that this Spa Town became really popular for the first time in the 6th century. The name "Guitiriz" is derived from "Witirici", the Latin genitive of Witiricus meaning "the place owned by Witiricus" (i.e.: Witiricus the Suebi warlord).

In the 14th century the entire Terra Chá Region (including Guitiriz and its capital Villalba) ended up as part of the domains of Fernán Pérez de Andrade whose family were to become the First Counts of Villalba during the reign of the Catholic Monarchs.

Amongst other remains in the area is a well conserved medieval fortification, the Castle of Parga, and a Gothic bridge.

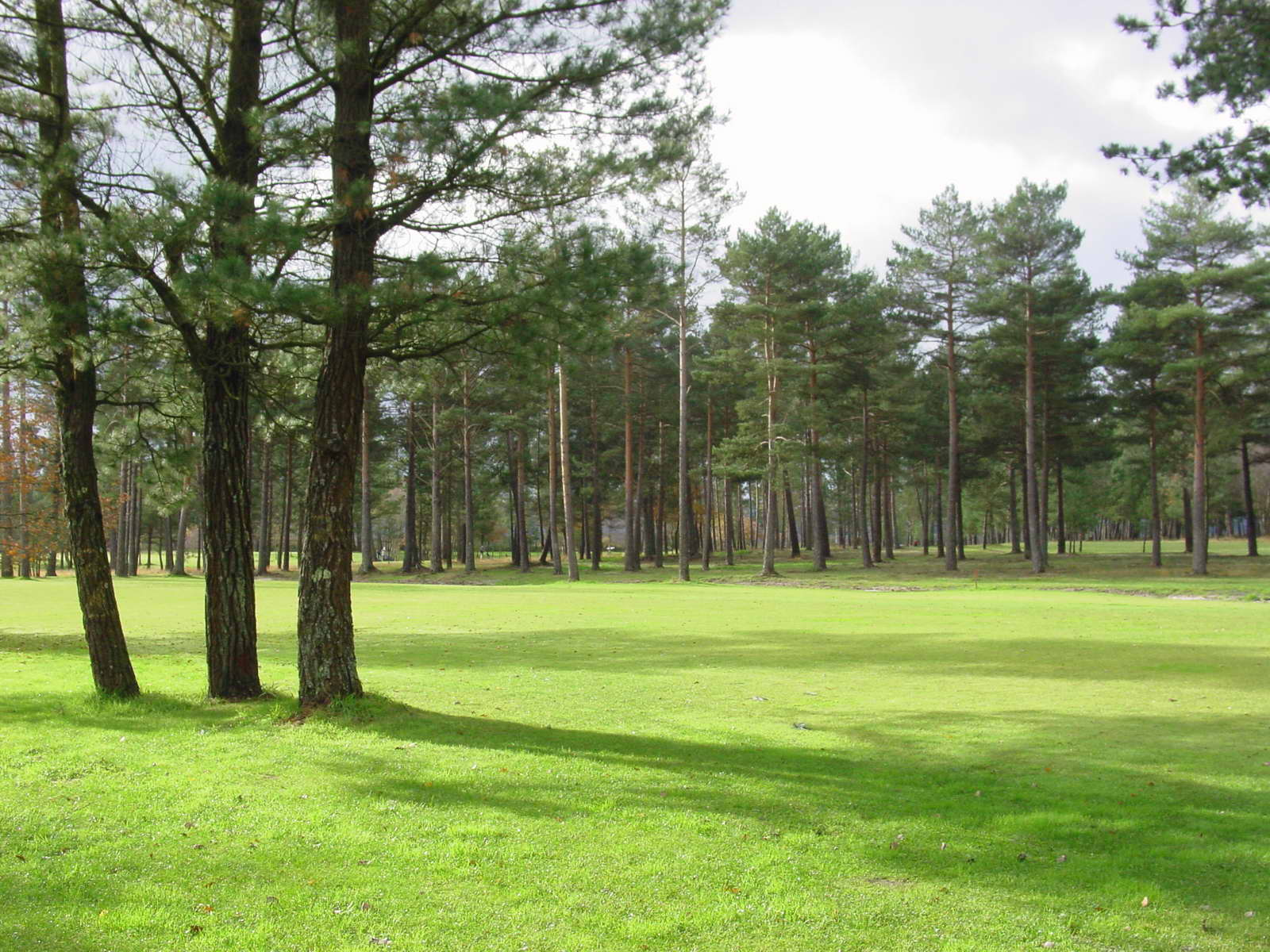
Surroundings of Guitiriz

== See also ==
- Hot spring
- Sauna
- Thermae
- Mineral water
- Balneotherapy
- Hydrotherapy
