= Begonte =

- Municipality
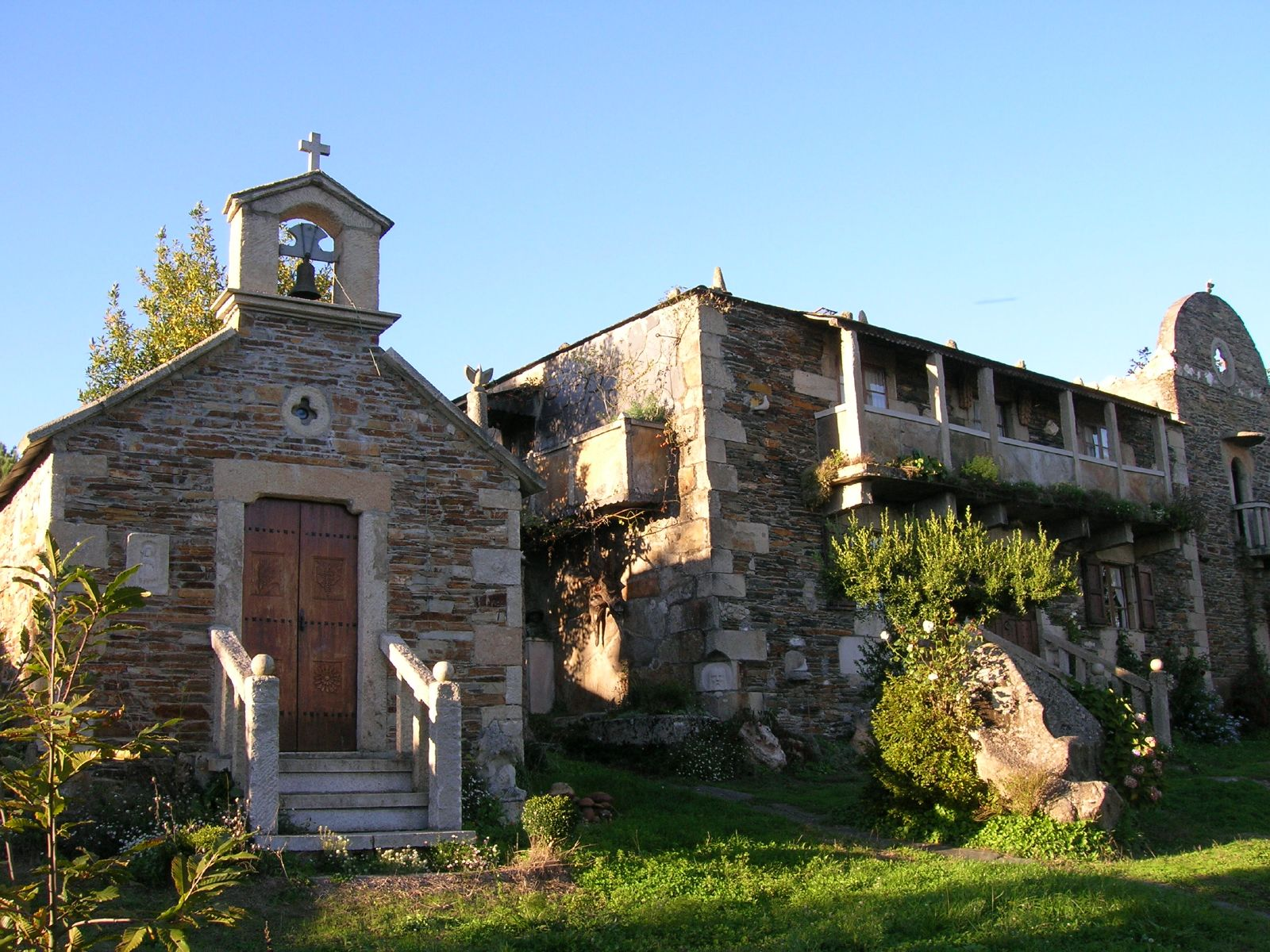
- Víctor Corral's historic house museum.

- Flag Coat of arms

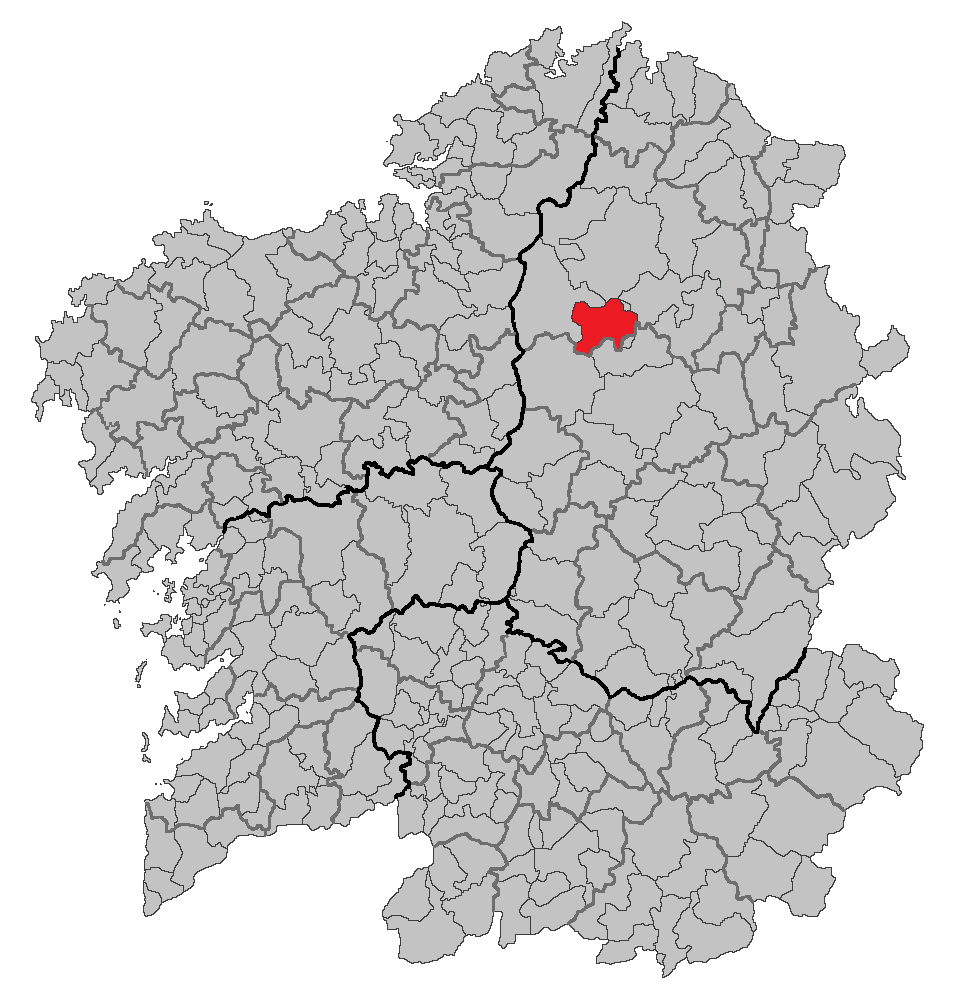
- Location of Begonte

- Location in Spain Begonte (Galicia)
- Country: Spain
- Autonomous community: Galicia
- Province: Lugo
- Comarca: Terra Chá

Government
  - Alcalde: José Ulla Rocha (PPdeG)

Area
  - Total: 126.79 km^{2} (48.95 sq mi)

Population (2024)
  - Total: 2,925
- Demonym(s): begontés, begontino, -a
- Time zone: UTC+1 (CET)
  - Summer (DST): UTC+2 (CEST)
- Postal code: 27...
- Website: Official website

Begonte (Galician pronunciation: [beˈɣontɪ]) is a municipality in the province of Lugo, in the autonomous community of Galicia, northwestern Spain. It belongs to the comarca of Terra Chá.
