= Cospeito =

- Municipality
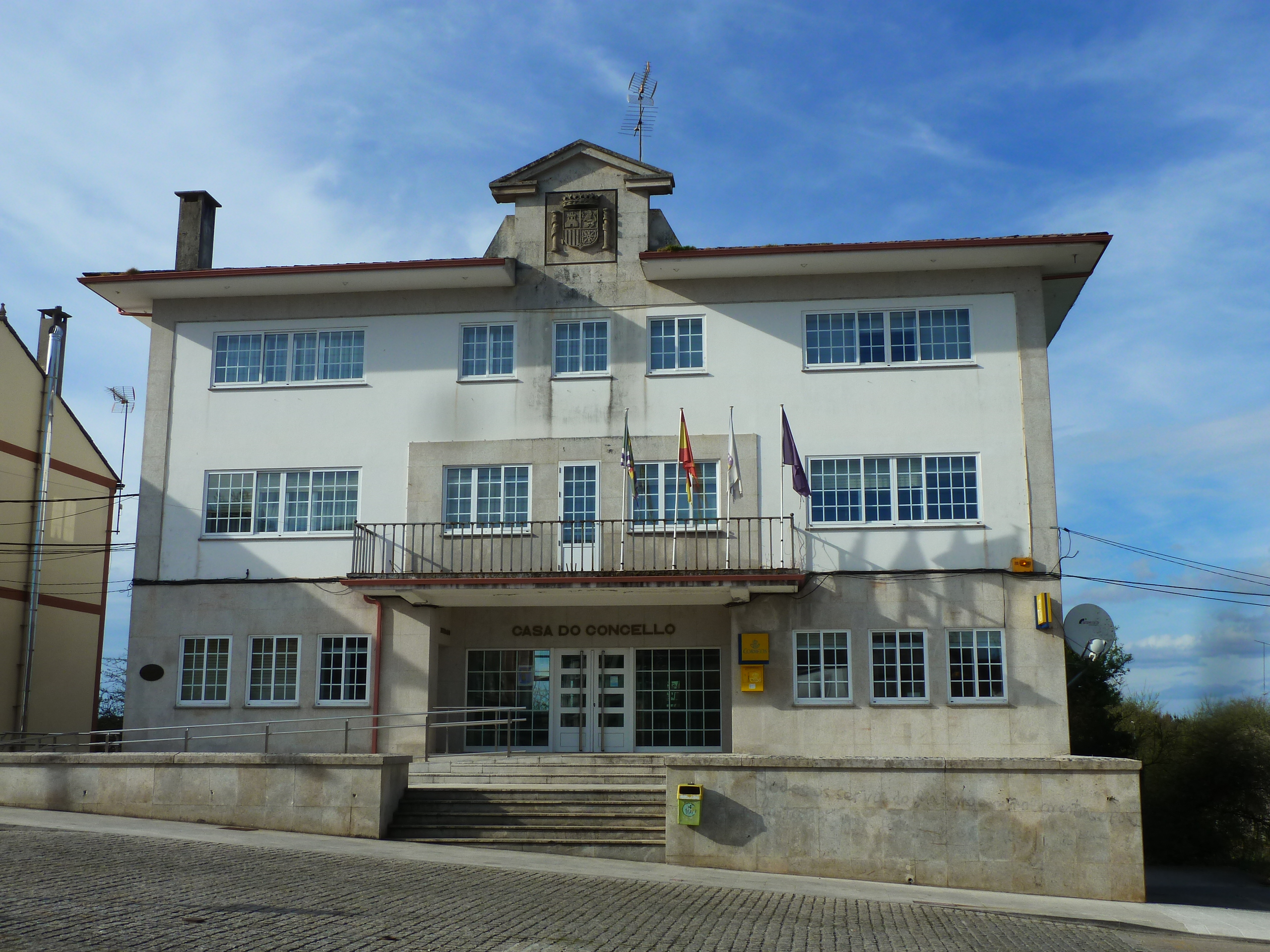

- Flag Coat of arms

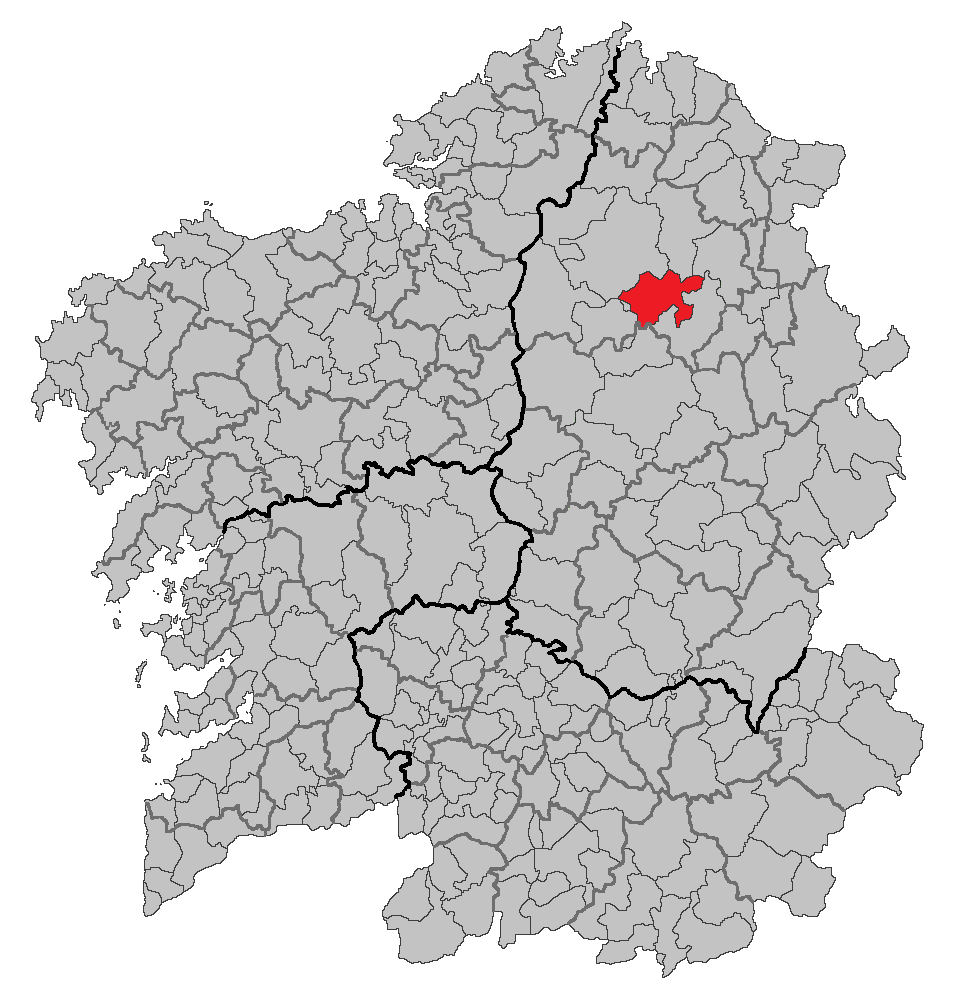

- Location in Spain
- Coordinates: 43°14′10″N 7°33′30″W
- Country: Spain
- Autonomous community: Galicia
- Province: Lugo
- Comarca: Terra Chá

Government
  - Alcalde: Armando Castosa Alvariño (2007) (PP)

Area
  - Total: 144.9 km^{2} (55.9 sq mi)
- Elevation: 762 m (2,500 ft)

Population (2025-01-01)
  - Total: 4,172
  - Density: 28.79/km^{2} (74.57/sq mi)
- Demonym: Cospeitense
- Time zone: UTC+1 (CET)
  - Summer (DST): UTC+2 (CEST)
- Postal code: 27377
- Dialing code: 982
- Website: Official website

Cospeito is a municipality of the Province of Lugo in Galicia. It is situated on the plain of Terra Chá. The population in 2007 was 5,349 according to the townhall register (5,609 in 2003).

== Etymology ==
It is still not clarified as to where the name comes from. According to Xosé L. G. Paz, it may have been derived from the name Conspecti (genitive of the name Conspectus). Another possibility is that it derives from "Conspectu(m)", which in Latin means "visible from the surrounding area".

== History and geography ==
It is located in the heart of Terra Chá. There are several small lakes in this area, the best known of which is the Lake of Cospeito. The surrounding wetland is populated by ducks, herons, lapwings and other species.

A pre-Roman hill fort which is known as O Torrillón can still be recognized in Támoga. A nearby castle was destroyed during the Irmandiño uprising.

The ruins of the Tower of Caldaloba (15th century), in the village of Pino, is one of its major monuments.

In this municipality, the German army was allowed to install during the Second World War three radionavigation antennas, 112 metres high with the aim of facilitating the positioning and follow-up of submarines (U-Boots) and aeroplanes in the Bay of Biscay.

== Notable people ==
- Xesús Rábade Paredes - writer and poet (b. 1949)
- Darío Xohán Cabana - writer and poet (b. 1952)
- Fidel Fernán Bello - journalist (b. 1954)
- Miguel Anxo Fernán-Vello - writer and poet (b. 1958)
- Emma Couceiro - writer and poet (b. 1977)
- Luis Tosar - actor (b. 1971)

== Villages ==
It is made up by the following villages:

- Arcillá (San Paio)
- Bestar (Santa María)
- Bexán ou Rubiños (San Paio)
- Cospeito (Santa María)
- Goá (San Xurxo)
- Lamas (San Martiño)
- Momán (San Pedro)
- Muimenta (Santa Mariña)
- Pino (San Martiño)
- Rioaveso (Santalla)
- Roás (San Miguel)
- Santa Cristina (San Xiao)
- Seixas (San Pedro)
- Sisoi (Santalla)
- Sistallo (San Xoán)
- Támoga (San Xiao)
- Vilapene (Santa María)
- Vilar (Santa María)
- Xermar (Santa María)
- Xustás (Santiago)
