= Abadín =

Coordinates: 43°22′N 7°29′W

Concello de Abadín
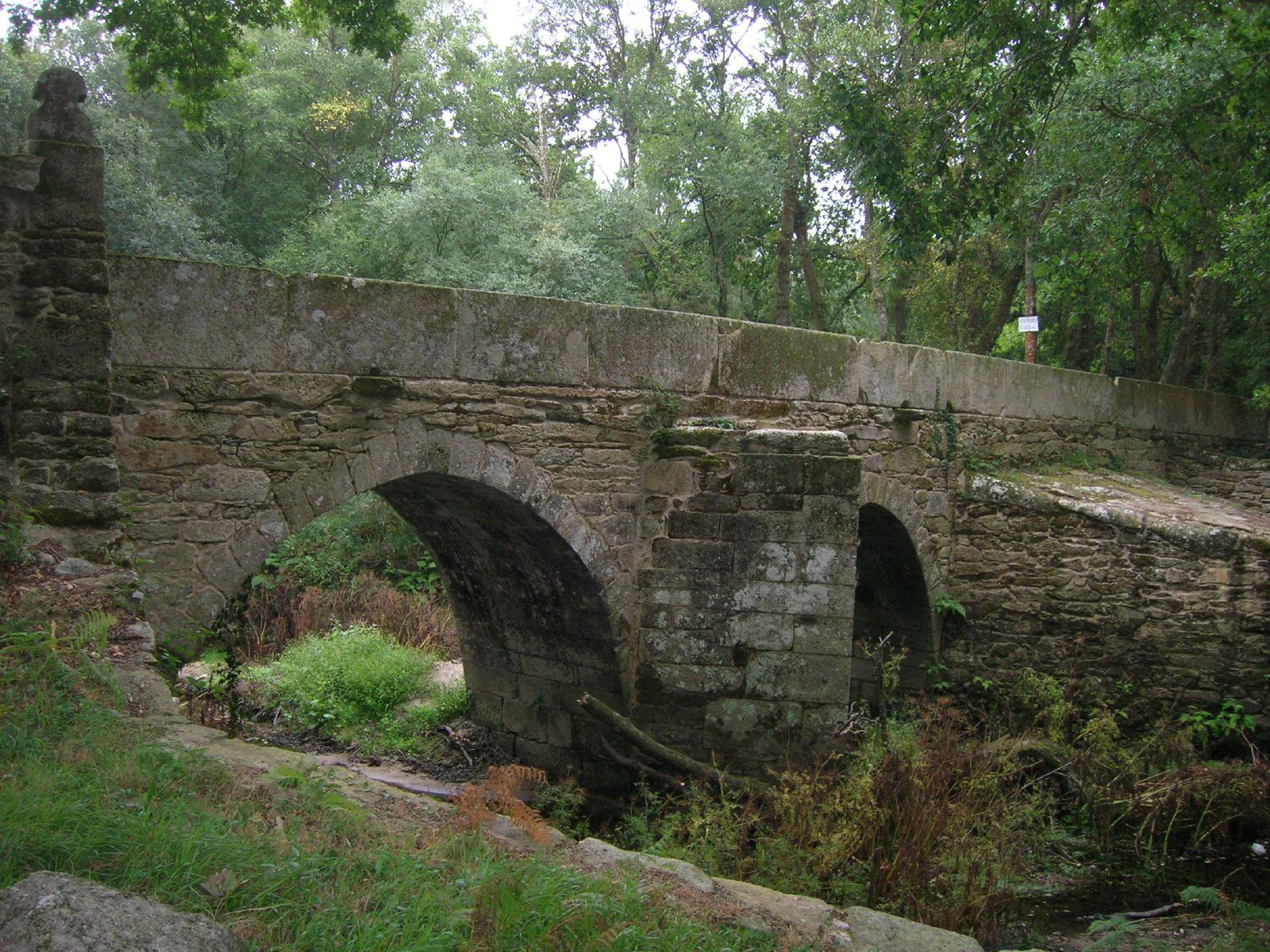

- Flag Coat of arms

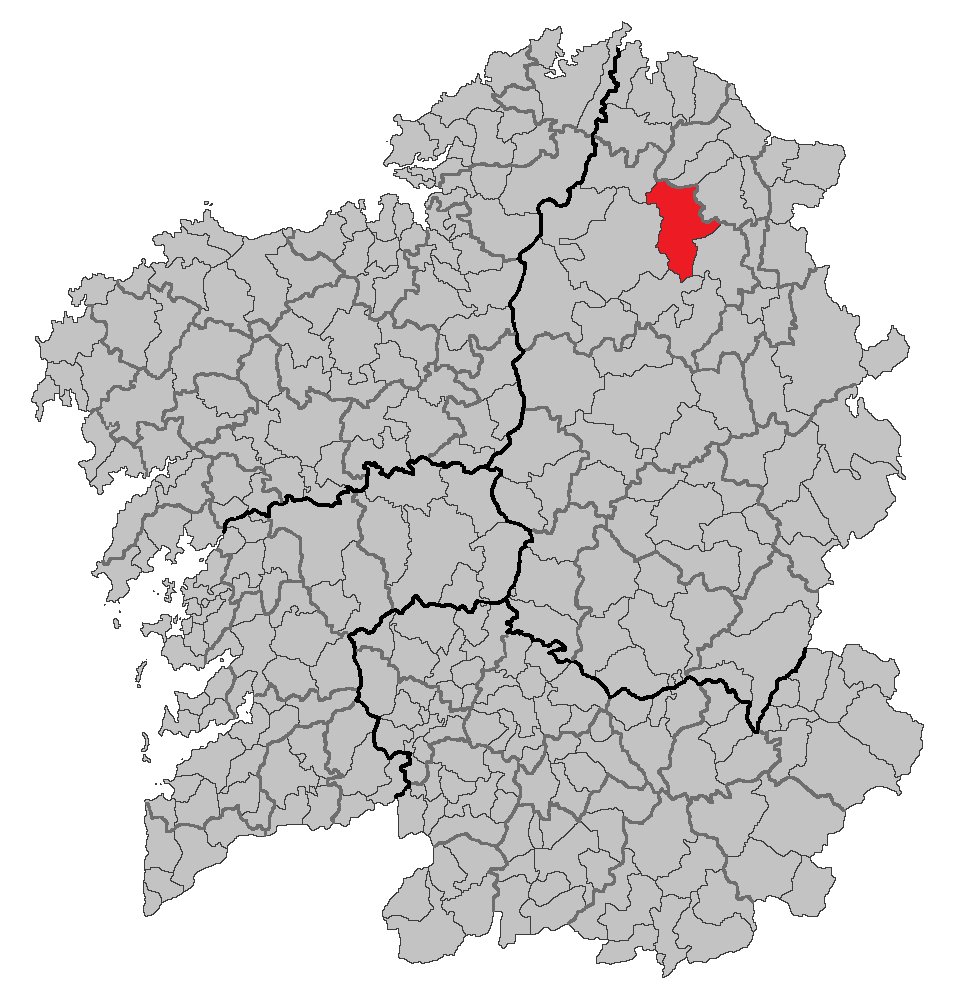
- Situation of Abadín within Galicia
- Parroquias: ?

Government
  - Alcalde (Mayor): Xosé María López Rancaño (?)

Area
  - Total: 196.1 km^{2} (75.7 sq mi)

Population (2025-01-01)
  - Total: 2,239
- Time zone: UTC+1 (CET)
  - Summer (DST): UTC+2 (CET)

Abadín (Galician pronunciation: [aβaˈðiŋ]) is a municipality in the province of Lugo, Galicia, Spain. It covers 196.1 km^{2} and has a population of 3,250 for a population density of 16.57/km^{2}. It resides in the region of Terra Cha.

== Geography ==
Abadín is situated in the north-east of Terra Chá. The municipality is crossed by the Serra do Xistral, the Cordal de Neda, and the rivers Labrada and Abadín. The mean elevation is of 500 m, and the highest point is Lombo Pequeno at 1015 m.

The countryside of Abadín is dominated by a fertile valley, crossed by the rivers Ouro, Labrada, Abadín, Pontiga, Santandrea, Pedrido, Anllo, Arnela, and Fraga Vella, and surrounded by mountains. They are the important sierras of Cordal de Neda, Toxoso, Tremoal, Couto da Cal, and A Fraga das Vigas, and the nearby mountains of Costa do Sol and O Picouto.

=== Climate ===
The mean annual temperature is about 10 °C. The rainfalls are high, 1799 mm./year. The winters are cold and rainy, and the summers are dry.

Historically Abadín has been linked to the Ancient Mondonedo Province (Ancient Galicia Kingdom) and the monastic sites of Meira or Lourenza Abbey. These religious and political centres have been related to the arrival by sea in the 5th-6th centuries of Britons from the British Isles (see Bishop Maeloc and Britonia)

=== Orography ===
The landscape of the municipality of Abadín is configured inside a fertile valley crossed by several rivers and streams and surrounded by mountains.

Morphologically there are two units: the first consists of a series of mountain ridges which include the Sierra de Carba in the west with the Pena da Agua (832 m), Sierra del Gistral in the northwest and the Sierra de Toxiza in the northeast with the Coto Cal (804 m). These elevations make up the northern edge of the Lugo plateau. The second unit constitutes the gently undulating, horizontal and morphological area of erosion which surfaces between 400 and 600 meters with the only elevation at Neda's Peak (796 meters) in the Cordal de Neda.

The highest point is Lombo Pequeño with an elevation of 1,027 meters in the Sierra del Gistral.

== Demography ==
Found: INE Archiv

=== Mountains ===
- Porto das Egoas (631 m.), Argán (585 m.), in the parish of Vilarente;
- Fonte da Mesa (900 m.), Costa de Currás (782 m.), in the parish of Montouto;
- Argán (585 m.), in the parish of Moncelos;
- Lombopequeno (1.015 m.), Río Pedrido (1.005 m.), Ladeiras do Seixobranco (962 m.), Airavella (961 m.), Salgueiriño (935 m.), Redondiño (916 m.), Pena da Cruz (831 m.), Mariñas do Rial (821 m.), Coto da Cal (807 m.), Chao da Fonce (788 m.), Pena do Montrol (779 m.), Curro do Bispo (707 m.), Porto da Calzada Vella (670 m.), A Santa (600 m.), in the parish of Labrada;
- Roza do Pleito (443 m.), Marco do Forneiro (440 m.), in the parish of Graña;
- Abelleira (617 m.), Goás (604 m.), Meixón (474 m.), in the parish of Goás;
- Rego de Bidueira (700 m.), Alto do Seixal (678 m.), Pena Grande (664 m.), in the parish of Galgao;
- Pena da Auga (831 m.), Pena Labrada (803 m.) in the parish of Fanoi;
- Sabugueiras (682 m.) e Argán (585 m.) in the parish of Corvite.
