= Province of Lugo =

Province of Spain

Coordinates: 43°00′N 7°30′W

Province of Lugo Provincia de Lugo (Spanish) Provincia de Lugo (Galician)
- Province
- Flag Coat of arms

- Location of the Province of Lugo in Spain
- Country: Spain
- Autonomous community: Galicia
- Capital: Lugo
- Municipalities: 67

Government
  - Body: Diputación de Lugo
  - President: Darío Campos Conde (since 2015) (Socialists' Party of Galicia)

Area
  - Total: 9,858.39 km^{2} (3,806.35 sq mi)
  - Rank: 26th in Spain

Population (2025)
  - Total: 326,022
  - Rank: 40th in Spain
  - Density: 33.0705/km^{2} (85.6522/sq mi)
- Demonym(s): Lugués (m), Luguesa (f); Lucense
- Postal code: 27---
- ISO 3166 code: ES-LU
- Parliament: 15 deputies (out of 75)
- Congress: 4 deputies (out of 350)
- Senate: 4 senators (out of 264)
- Website: deputacionlugo.gal

The Province of Lugo (Spanish: Provincia de Lugo, Galician: Provincia de Lugo) is a province of northwestern Spain, in the northeastern part of the autonomous community of Galicia. It is bordered by the provinces of Ourense, Pontevedra, A Coruña, and León, the principality of Asturias, and in the north by the Cantabrian Sea (Bay of Biscay).

The population is 325,048, of which over a quarter live in the namesake capital Lugo. The capital city was an ancient Celtic settlement named in honour of the god Lugh (see Lyon), later Latinised as Lucus Augusti, and which became one of the three main important Galician-Roman centres alongside Braccara Augusta and Asturica Augusta (modern Braga and Astorga respectively). The province has 67 municipalities.

== Geography ==
=== Estuaries ===
The estuaries of the Lugo province are part of the Atlas estuaries. From west to east they are:

- O Barqueiro estuary
- Viveiro estuary
- Foz estuary
- Ribadeo estuary

=== Rivers ===
- Miño river
- Sil river
- Landro river
- Ouro river
- Masmo river

=== Municipalities ===
The province has 67 municipalities:

- A Fonsagrada
- A Pastoriza
- A Pobra do Brollón
- A Pontenova
- Abadín
- Alfoz
- Antas de Ulla
- As Nogais
- Baleira
- Baralla
- Barreiros
- Becerreá
- Begonte
- Bóveda
- Burela
- Carballedo
- Castro de Rei
- Castroverde
- Cervantes
- Cervo
- Chantada
- Cospeito
- Folgoso do Courel
- Foz
- Friol
- Guitiriz
- Guntín
- Láncara
- Lourenzá
- Lugo
- Meira
- Mondoñedo
- Monforte de Lemos
- Monterroso
- Muras
- Navia de Suarna
- Negueira de Muñiz
- O Corgo
- O Incio
- O Páramo
- O Saviñao
- O Valadouro
- O Vicedo
- Ourol
- Outeiro de Rei
- Palas de Rei
- Pantón
- Paradela
- Pedrafita do Cebreiro
- Pol
- Portomarín
- Quiroga
- Rábade
- Ribadeo
- Ribas de Sil
- Ribeira de Piquín
- Riotorto
- Samos
- Sarria
- Sober
- Taboada
- Trabada
- Triacastela
- Vilalba
- Viveiro
- Xermade
- Xove

== Demographics ==
Historical population
Year	Pop.	±%
1842	323,158	—
1857	424,186	+31.3%
1877	415,501	−2.0%
1887	438,076	+5.4%
1900	476,357	+8.7%
1910	512,467	+7.6%
1920	517,918	+1.1%
1930	523,911	+1.2%
1940	545,128	+4.0%
1950	521,213	−4.4%
1960	491,955	−5.6%
1970	423,064	−14.0%
1981	405,365	−4.2%
1991	384,365	−5.2%
2001	357,648	−7.0%
2011	348,067	−2.7%
2021	326,068	−6.3%
Source: INE

As of 2025, the population is 326,022, of which 48.5% are male, and 51.5% are female. Minors make up 12.2% of the population, and seniors make up 30.2%.

=== Immigration ===
As of 2025, immigrants make up 12.2% of the population. The 5 largest foreign countries of birth are Colombia, Venezuela, Morocco, Cuba, and the Dominican Republic.

=== Languages ===
The vast majority of people have a common language, Galician. Some people, especially the older generation, are monolingual in Galician. Even in the capital, the vitality of Galician in conversation is very strong.

The inhabitants speak several variants of Galician in the province of Lugo. They have the characteristics of being the closest to León isoglosses and therefore also Castilian. That makes them they some grammatical and phonetic signs that are mistakenly considered influences of Castilian or of Leonese. However, the Galician spoken in Lugo, especially in non-coastal areas, is probably the most conservative in Galicia because almost no historic pressure from Castilian has existed on the rural population.

== See also ==
- Galician wine
