= Comarcas of Galicia =

Galicia is divided into comarcas. In Galician, comarcas are sometimes also called bisbarras (IPA: [bizˈβarɐs]). There are 53 comarcas in Galicia.

== Comarcas of the province of A Coruña ==
- A Barcala
- A Coruña
- Arzúa
- Barbanza
- Betanzos
- Bergantiños
- Eume
- Ferrol
- Fisterra
- Muros
- Noia
- O Sar
- Ordes
- Ortegal
- Santiago
- Terra de Melide
- Terra de Soneira
- Xallas

== Comarcas of the province of Lugo ==
- A Fonsagrada
- A Mariña Central
- A Mariña Occidental
- A Mariña Oriental
- A Ulloa
- Chantada
- Lugo
- Meira
- Os Ancares
- Quiroga
- Sarria
- Terra Chá
- Terra de Lemos

== Comarcas of the province of Ourense ==
- Allariz - Maceda
- A Baixa Limia
- O Carballiño
- A Limia
- Ourense
- O Ribeiro
- Terra de Caldelas
- Terra de Celanova
- Terra de Trives
- Valdeorras
- Verín
- Viana

== Comarcas of the province of Pontevedra ==
- A Paradanta
- Caldas
- O Deza
- O Baixo Miño
- O Condado
- O Morrazo
- O Salnés
- Pontevedra
- Tabeirós - Terra de Montes
- Vigo
