= Torbeo =

- Municipality
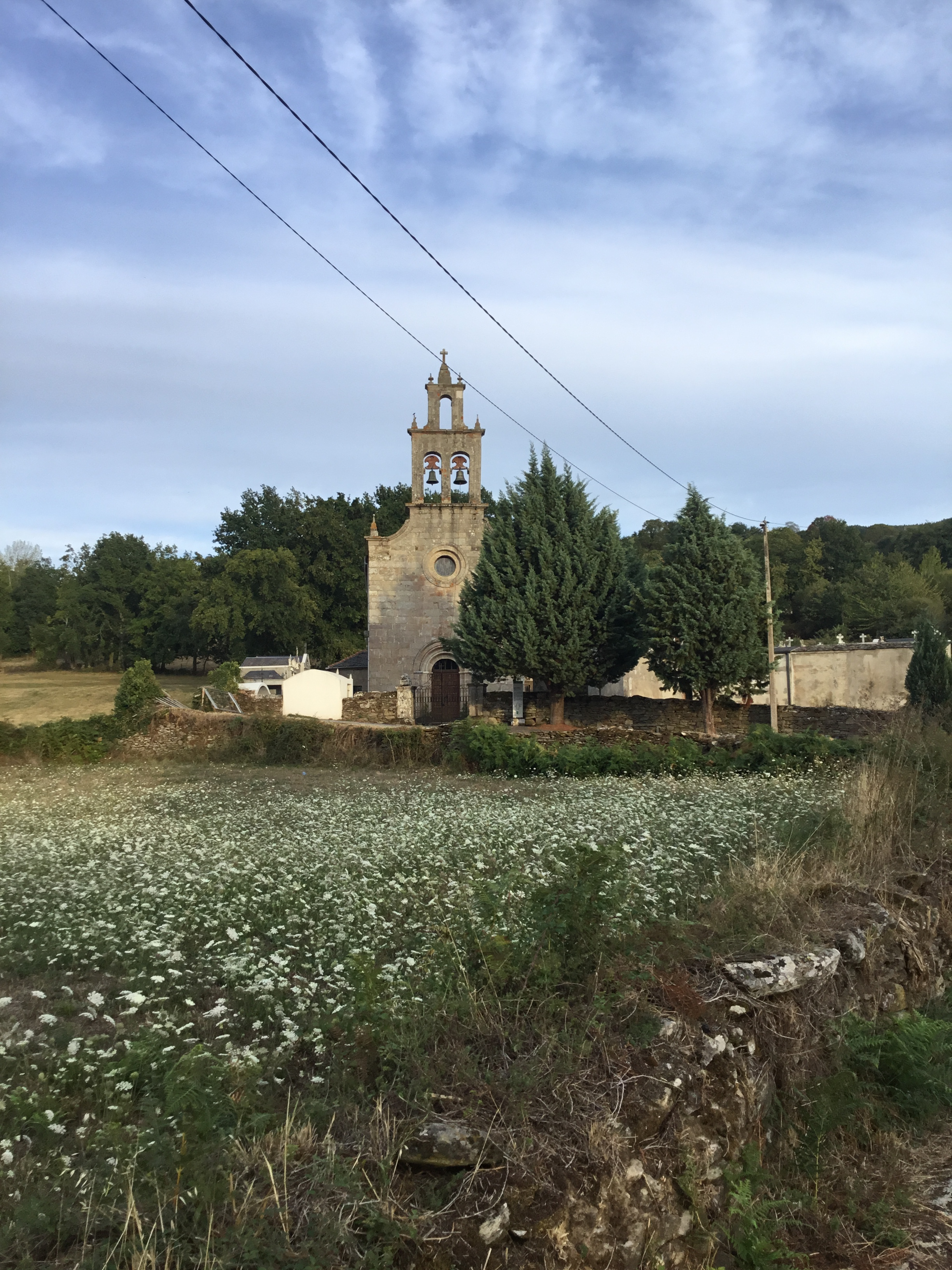
- Church of Santa Maria of the XII century

- Coat of arms

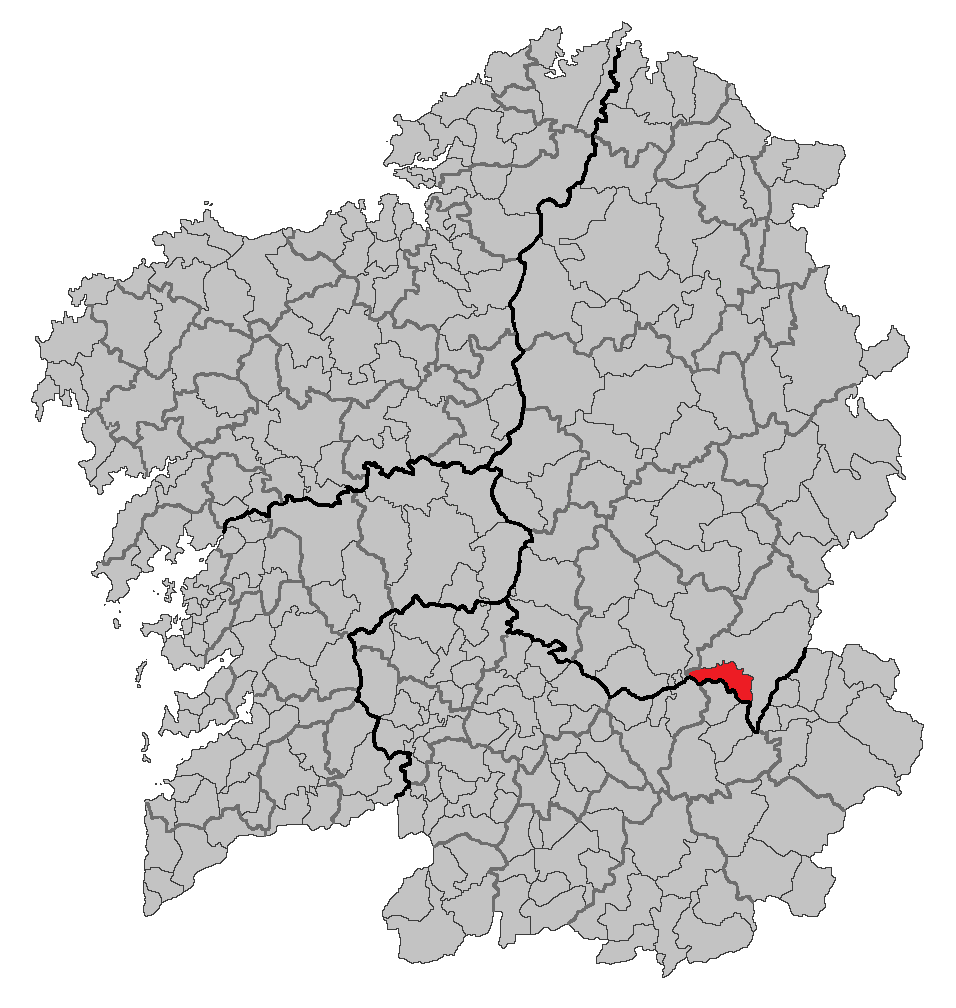
- Location of Torbeo

- Location of Torbeo Torbeo (Spain)
- Coordinates: 42°26′35″N 7°22′41″W
- Country: Spain
- Autonomous community: Galicia
- Province: Lugo
- Comarca: Quiroga

Government
  - Town Hall: Ribas de Sil

Area
  - Total: 1,620 km^{2} (630 sq mi)
- Elevation: 645 m (2,116 ft)

Population (2019)
  - Total: 82
  - Density: 0.051/km^{2} (0.13/sq mi)
- Demonym(s): Torbeano, na
- Time zone: UTC+1 (CET)
  - Summer (DST): UTC+2 (CEST)
- Postal code: 27317
- Dialing code: 982
- Website: Official website

Torbeo, officially called Santa María de Torbeo, is a Galician parish and village in the municipality of Ribas de Sil, in Spain. The corresponding catholic parish is dedicated to Saint Mary and is part of the archpriesthood of Monforte in the Diocese of Lugo. In 2025, the population of the parish was 65 people and the population of the village was 40.

== Geography ==
Torbeo is characterized by its mountainous landscape and its location along the Sil River. It is found in Ribeira Sacra, which is known for its variety of wine. It is surrounded by chestnut forests, including a "torbeano" chestnut variety. It has a total of 1620 hectares of land. It is also a part of the O Caurel Mountains Geopark, a UNESCO-certifed Geopark.

=== Territorial organization ===
The parish is divided into 20 singular population entities:

- Barrio
- Campos
- O Carballiño
- Cortes
- Cubela
- Filguiero
- As Fontes
- Lama de Paio
- Moreiras de Baixo
- Moreiras do Meio
- Moreiras de Riba
- Outeiro
- Pacios
- Paredes
- Pozas
- San Lourenzo
- San Martiño
- Torbeo
- Ventosa
- Vilares
