= Pedrafita do Cebreiro =

Coordinates: 42°43′35″N 7°01′20″W

- Municipality
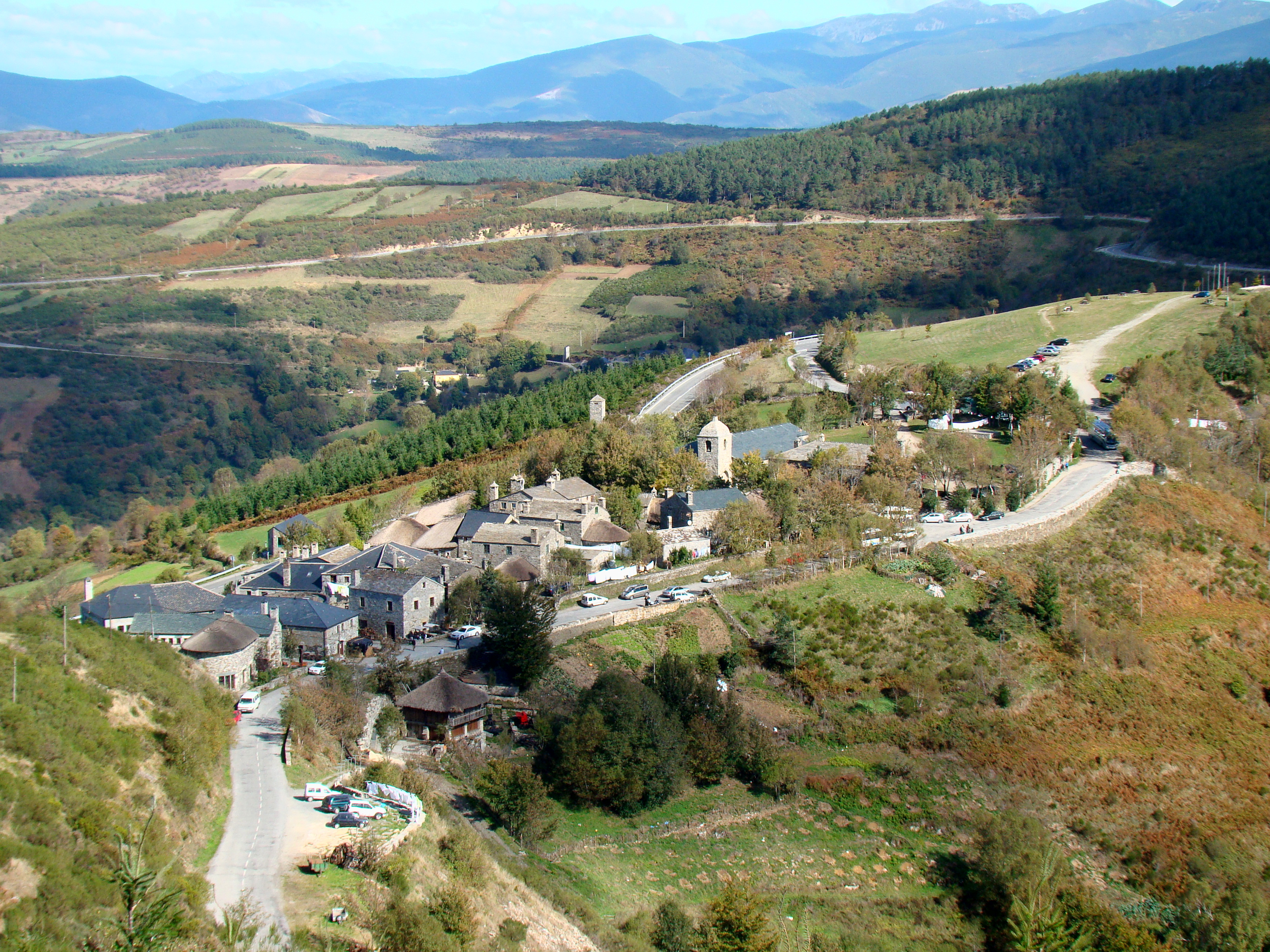
- Aerial view of the village.

- Coat of arms

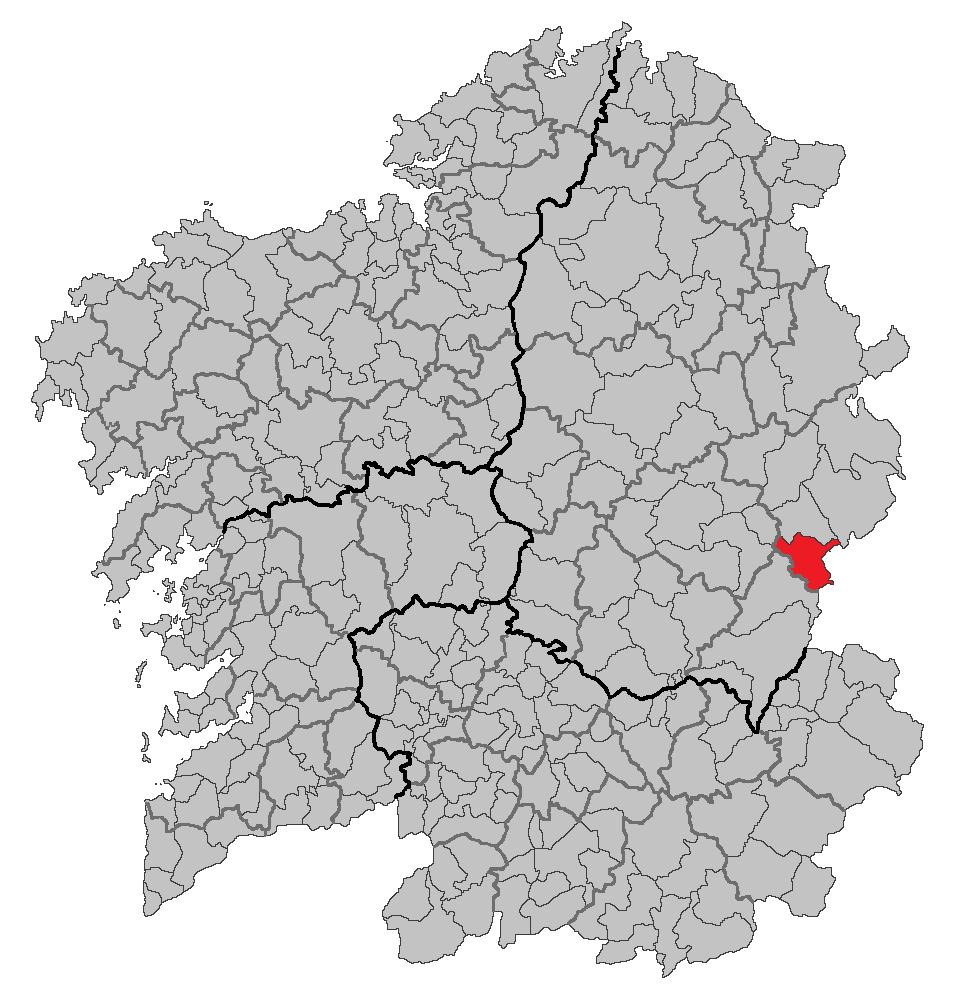
- Location of Pedrafita do Cebreiro

- Location in Spain
- Country: Spain
- Autonomous community: Galicia
- Province: Lugo
- Comarca: Os Ancares

Government
  - Alcalde: José Luis Raposo Magdalena (PSdeG)

Population (2025-01-01)
  - Total: 868
- Demonym(s): cebreirego, -a
- Time zone: UTC+1 (CET)
  - Summer (DST): UTC+2 (CEST)
- Postal code: 27000–27999
- Website: Official website

Pedrafita do Cebreiro is a municipality in the province of Lugo in Galicia, Spain. It borders the Lugo municipalities of As Nogais, Cervantes, Folgoso do Courel, Samos and Triacastela. Its eastern boundary borders the province of León. It belongs to the comarca of Os Ancares.

The French Way of the Way of St. James enters Galicia from León through the municipality and passes through the village of O Cebreiro. The village has some pallozas, including one that houses a small ethnographic museum. The Royal St. Mary's Church, also known as the Church of St. Benedict, was built in O Cebreiro in 1965–71 on the foundations of a pre-Romanesque church rediscovered in 1962.

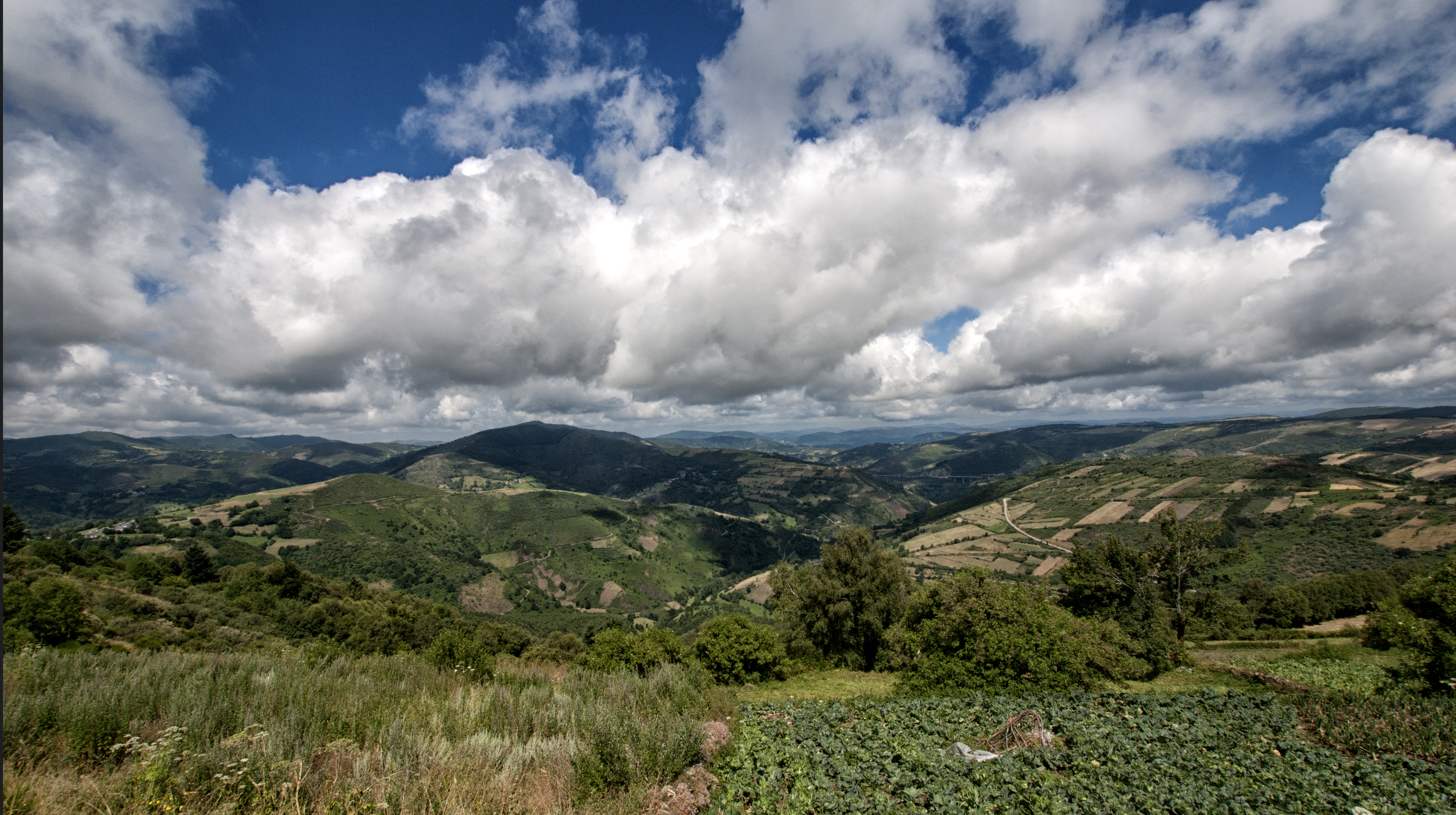
Way of St. James near O Cebreiro

== History ==
The history of the town is strongly influenced by the importance of its port, the importance it has in the Camino de Santiago and the main gateway to the north of Galicia. The pallozas, archaic type of homes from which some specimens are preserved in the village of O Cebreiro, testify to a settlement before the Romans. Some of them have been restored to house an ethnographic museum and a refuge for pilgrims. The Port of Piedradita was crossed by a Roman road that led from Astorga to Triacastela, on the interior the ancient Galicia. Later that road gave way to medieval roads leading to Camino de Santiago and a Camino Real.

The religious importance of this step was reinforced by the legendary miracle of the Holy Grail, which occurred in O Cebreiro, and since then a must for the Jacobean pilgrims. In 1486 the Catholic Monarchs, on a pilgrimage to Santiago, stopped at the monastery of O Cebreiro and donated the shrine where the relics of the miracle. The old Romanesque monastery chalice appears in the arms of Galicia.

The road also had great importance in the Spanish War of Independence, due to its strategic position between León and Galicia. In 1809 it was used by the Scottish troops of General John Moore, in his retreat to La Coruña as he was pursued by the French. Several hundred British were killed due to the harshness of that winter. During this period, the relics of O Cebreiro were hidden in the village of Foxos, but the documents of the monastery were destroyed.

From the nineteenth century Piedrafita do Cebreiro was a passage of the first modern highway between Galicia and the plateau. In the twentieth century it became the first motorway, which crosses the harbor by two tunnels.

== Demography ==
From:INE Archiv

== Civil parishes ==
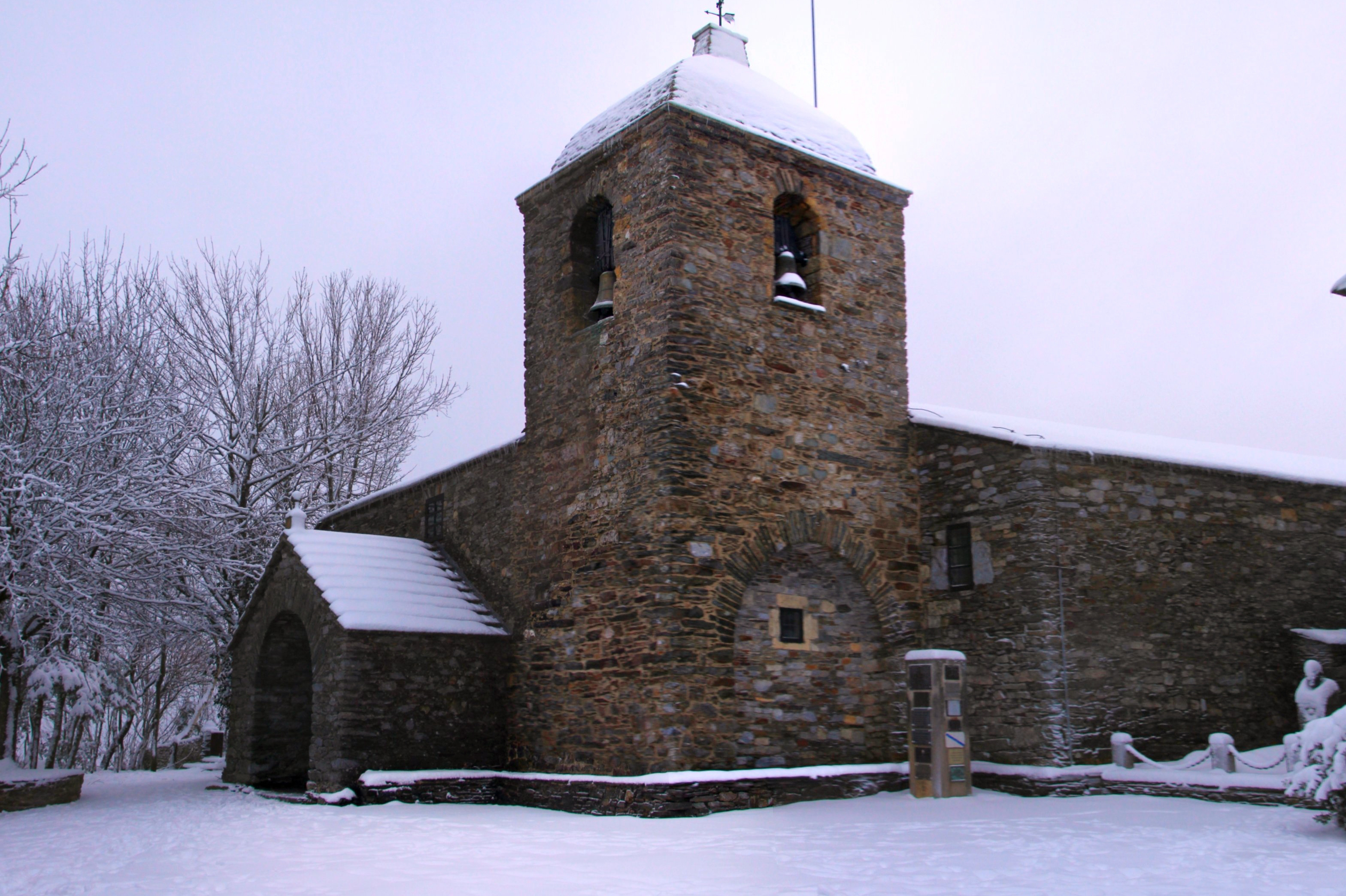

- O Cebreiro (Santa María)
- Fonfría (San Xoán)
- Hospital (San Xoán)
- Liñares (Santo Estevo)
- Lousada (San Vicente)
- Louzarela (San Xoán)
- Pacios (San Lourenzo)
- Padornelo (San Xoán)
- Pedrafita do Cebreiro (Santo Antón)
- Riocereixa (Santa María Madanela)
- Veiga de Forcas (Santa María)
- Zanfoga (San Martiño)
