= Eva Xaním =

Galician writer/ teacher

Eva González Álvarez
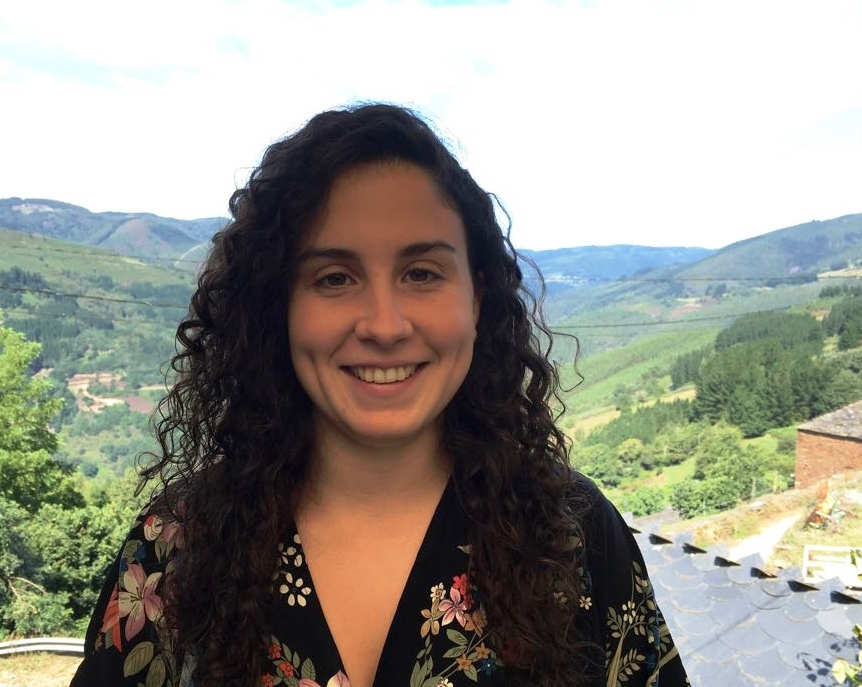
- Born: December 11, 1994 (age 31); Navia de Suarna
- Writing career
- Pen name: Eva Xanim

Eva González Álvarez (known as Eva Xanim; born December 11, 1994), is a Galician writer and teacher.

== Life ==
The pseudonym "Xanim" comes from the name of her father's house.

Besides Navia de Suarna, she is also linked to the Asturian town Ibias, where her parents were born.

Eva began her studies in the IES Lucus Augusti, where she also made the teaching practices. She graduated from USC with a degree in Galician Language and Literature and Spanish Language and Literature. In July 2018 she passed the exam for Public Service of secondary school teacher of Galician Language and Literature.

She writes poetic and narratives texts and has collaborated in numerous literary projects, magazines and book presentations.

== Work ==
She collaborated with Xistral, a magazine from Lugo, and took part in various collective books:

- Abadessa, oí dizer, relatos eróticos de escritoras da Galiza (2017). Autoras: Carmen Blanco, María Lado, Verónica Martínez, Raquel Miragaia, Teresa Moure, Emma Pedreira, Isabel Rei Samartim, Susana Sánchez Arins, Rexina Vega e Eva Xanim. Através Editora, 120 páxinas. ISBN 978-84-16545-09-4
- Remédios para o galego (2017). Diego Bernal, Valentim Fagim (coord.). Através Editora. ISBN 978-84-16545-13-1
