= Suarbol =

Suarbol is a village belonging to the shire of Los Ancares situated in the region of El Bierzo within the province of León (Castile & León, Spain). Both Suarbol and its neighbouring town Balouta are the last villages of the province of León before crossing towards the province of Lugo (Galicia, Spain). It belongs to the municipality of Valle de Ancares.

At present, Suarbol has seven inhabitants, reaching 34 in summer vacations. The locals live mainly by having farms. The inhabitants of Suarbol for the most part migrated to Barcelona in the 1950s and the 1960s, and still keep their houses in this village nowadays. The one that migrated, usually make their way back to Suarbol in holidays, generally in order to spend their summer holidays here.

The first name of Suarbol was Ambasaguas (that means surrounded by water, since the village is surrounded by two rivers: one at the entrance of the village and the other at the exit.

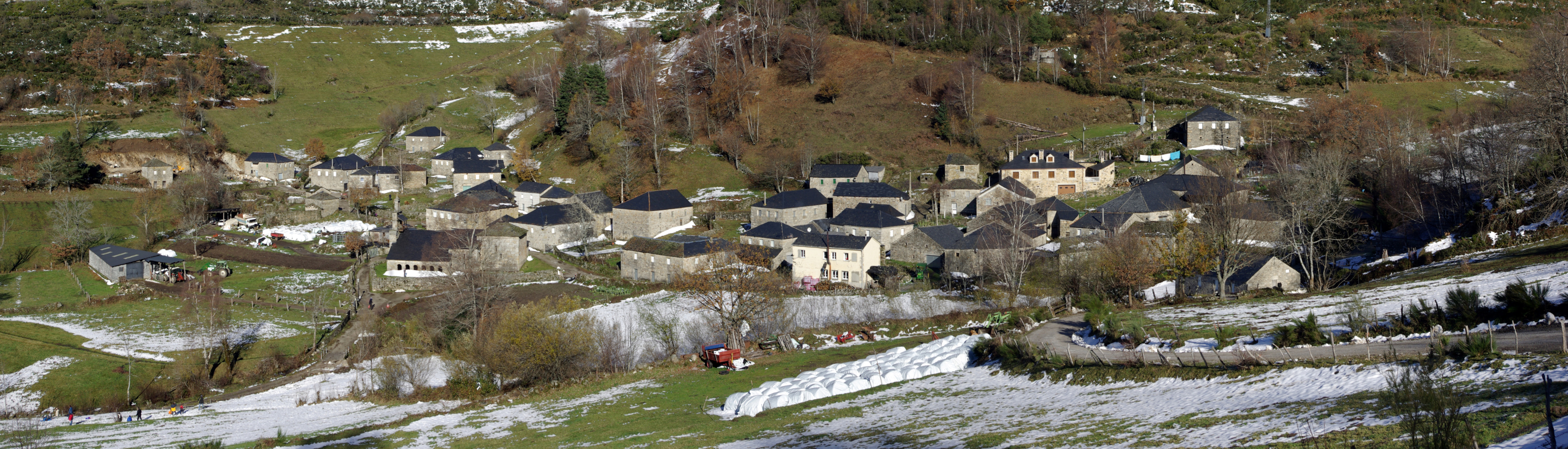
Panoramic view of Suarbol

== Heritage ==
The main element defining Suarbol is its traditional architecture buildings: horreos (a sort of granary typical in Northern Spain) and pallozas (a sort of oval-shaped house typical in Northern Spain). Suarbol was famous for owning the biggest palloza in the shire of Los Ancares, but unfortunately it was burned in 1957; the site, where it stood, already remains. However some other pallozas in good state of preservation stand and can be visited in the village. There are also some horreos in square-shaped floor and in slate roofs (similar to the Asturian horreo) in Suarbol. In the past, most building roofs were made of straw and were known as teitos, nonetheless most building roofs today are made of slate just like most of the towns and villages of the region of El Bierzo.

The most outstanding monument is the Parish Church of Suarbol. It is a Baroque style building and was declared Good of Cultural Interest in 1995 by the Spanish government. The graveyard of the town is inside the church yard, a characteristic uncommon in Spain.

Suarbol also owns other monuments like the Roman Causeway of Suarbol, a path linking the gold mines of Ibias in Asturias to other gold mines in the region of El Bierzo in the Roman times. In Suarbol, some stone carvings dating back to the Castro culture can be found in the village and their meaning is unknown.

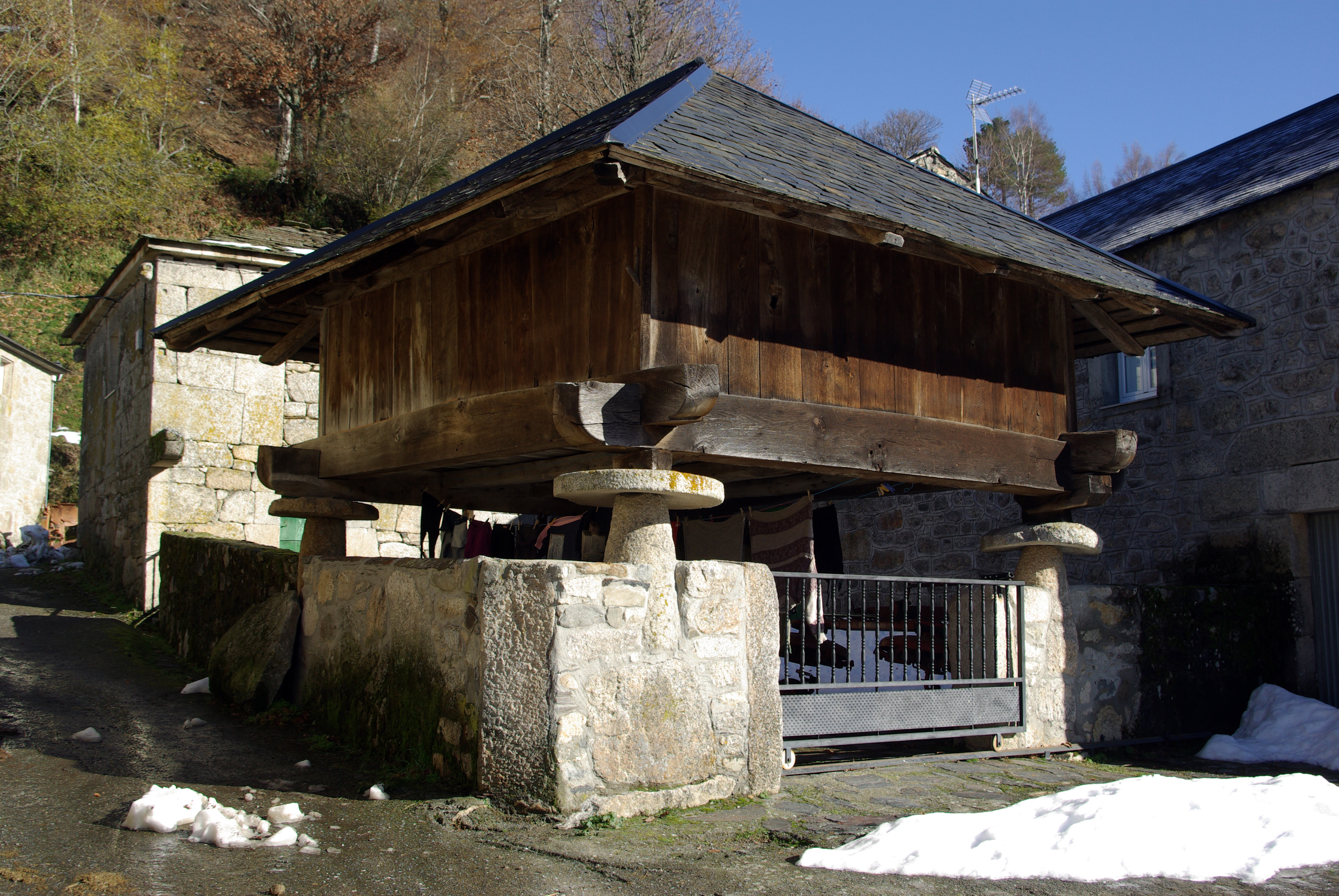

== Feasts ==
The fest of Suarbol it on August 17, in honour to Virgin Mary.

== See also ==
- Valle de Ancares
- Los Ancares
- El Bierzo
- Province of León
- Castile and León
