= Fontarón =

Parish in Spain

- Parish
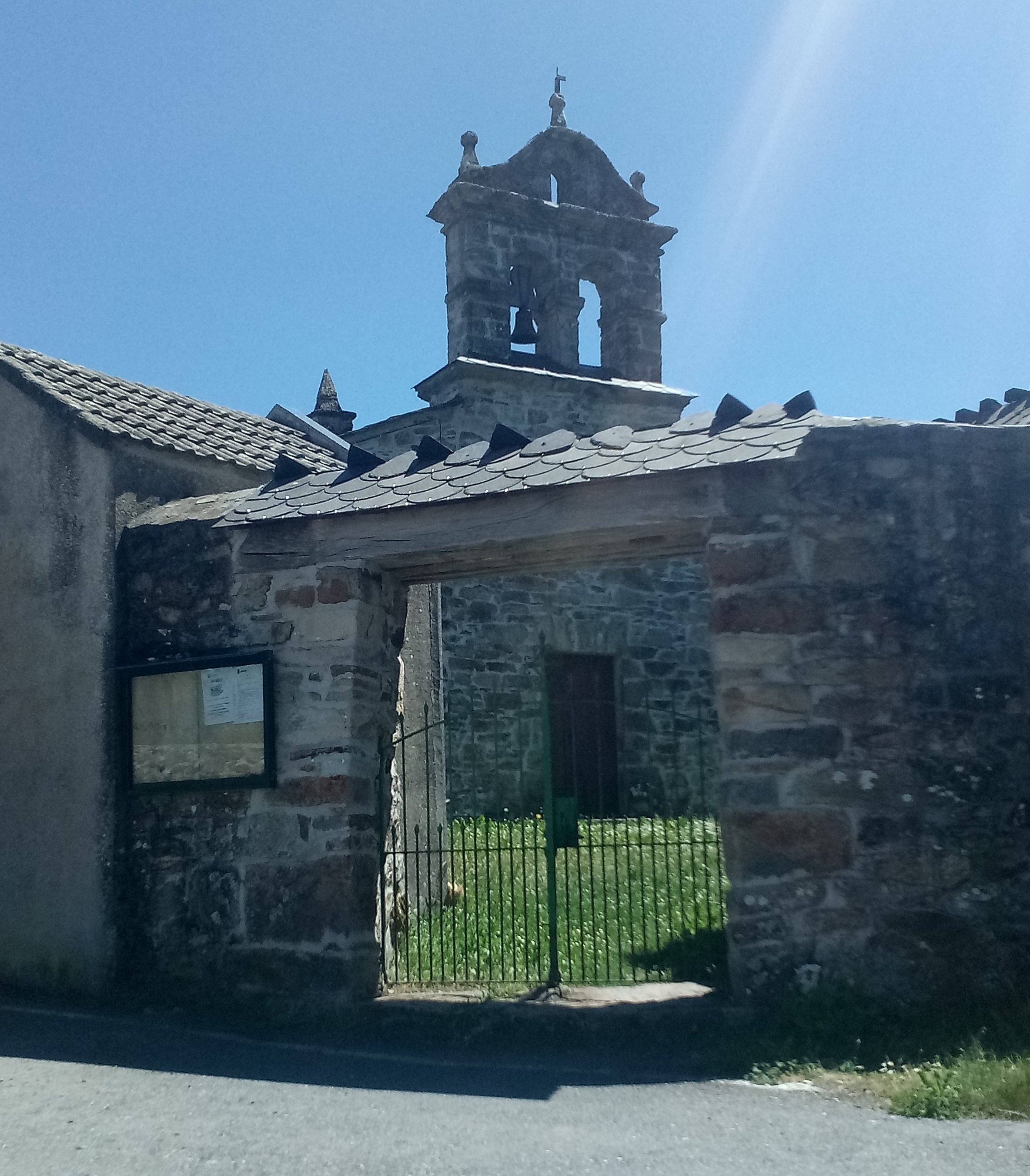
- The parish church of Fontarón

- Location within Spain
- Coordinates: 42°55′56.6″N 07°08′54.8″W
- Country: Spain
- Autonomous Community: Galicia
- Province: Lugo
- County: Los Ancares
- Municipality: Becerreá

Area
  - Total: 11 km^{2} (4.2 sq mi)

Population (2030)
  - Total: 46
  - Density: 4.2/km^{2} (11/sq mi)
- Postcode: 27698
- Area code: +34-982
- ISO 3166-2: ES-LU
- Patron Saint: Holy Spirit

Fontarón is a parish of the municipality of Becerreá, in Galicia, Spain.

According to the Instituto Galego de Estatística (IGE), in 2014, Fontarón had 51 inhabitants (27 men and 24 women), 13 less than it had in 2004 (33 men and 31 women), and 20 less than it had in 1999. According to the Nomenclátor of the Xunta de Galicia, it has nine entities of population.

Near the middle of the 19th century, Fontarón was recorded as having 219 inhabitants.

The parish have a 11,66 km^{2} the area and 870 m the 870 m.

== Myths and legends ==
The parish church is consecrated to the Holy Spirit. It is said that when the temple was erected, the sculpture of the dove that we can see next to the entrance marched to the place where it had always been, an old chapel nowadays gone. The only way he could stay in the church was to tear down the chapel. It is said that there was also a saint, from the said hermitage, who did the same. In order not to slip, the priest said that the only way he could stay in the church was to offer money to the image.

== Notable people ==
- Enriqueta Otero Blanco, teacher and guerrilla, Galician communist (1910-1989).
