= Basille =

Human settlement in Lugo Province, Spain

Coordinates: 42°53′N 7°17′W

Basille is a village in the province of Lugo, Spain. It is within the parish of Santiago de Pousada, a municipality of Baralla.

== Houses ==
Basille has 10 houses, 8 of which are inhabited: "Casa de Álvaro" (abandoned), "Casa de Mateo", "Casa de Ventosinos", "Casa de Prieto", "Casa de Vilela", "Casa dos Touzón" (También llamada "Casa do Souto"), "Casa do Civil", "Casa de Ayán" (abandoned), "Casa de Touville", and "Casa da Torre" (an ancestral home). The population is 17: 7 women and 10 men.

== Economy ==
Livestock provide the basis for the village's economy. Fields are verdant from irrigation. Chestnuts and apples are also widely collected.
