= Manuel Martínez Núñez =

Spanish politician

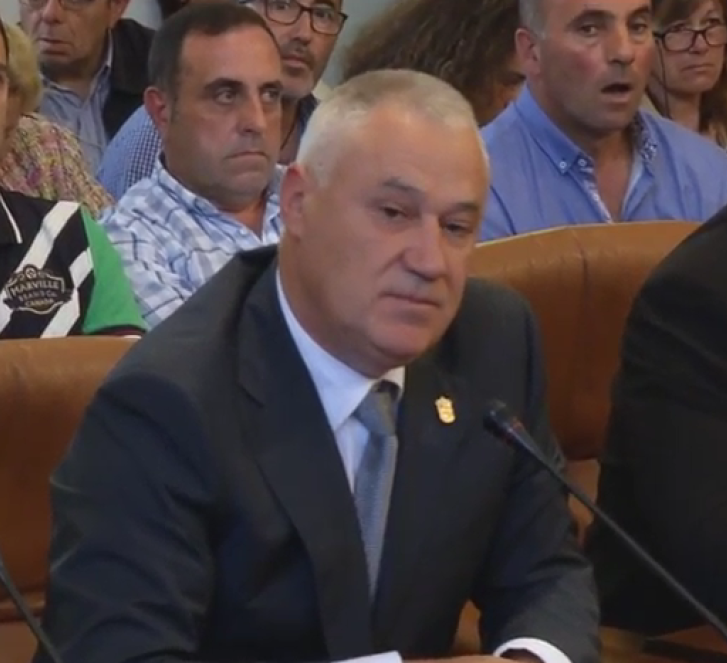
- Preceded by: Antonio Fernandez Pombo
- Succeeded by: Management Commission

Personal details
- Party: Galicia Always
- Occupation: Politician

Manuel Martínez Núñez (born 12 September 1954) is a Spanish professor and politician from Galicia Sempre and former ex-president of Suplusa.
