= Os Ancares =

Coordinates: 42.8333°N 7.08333°W

- Comarca
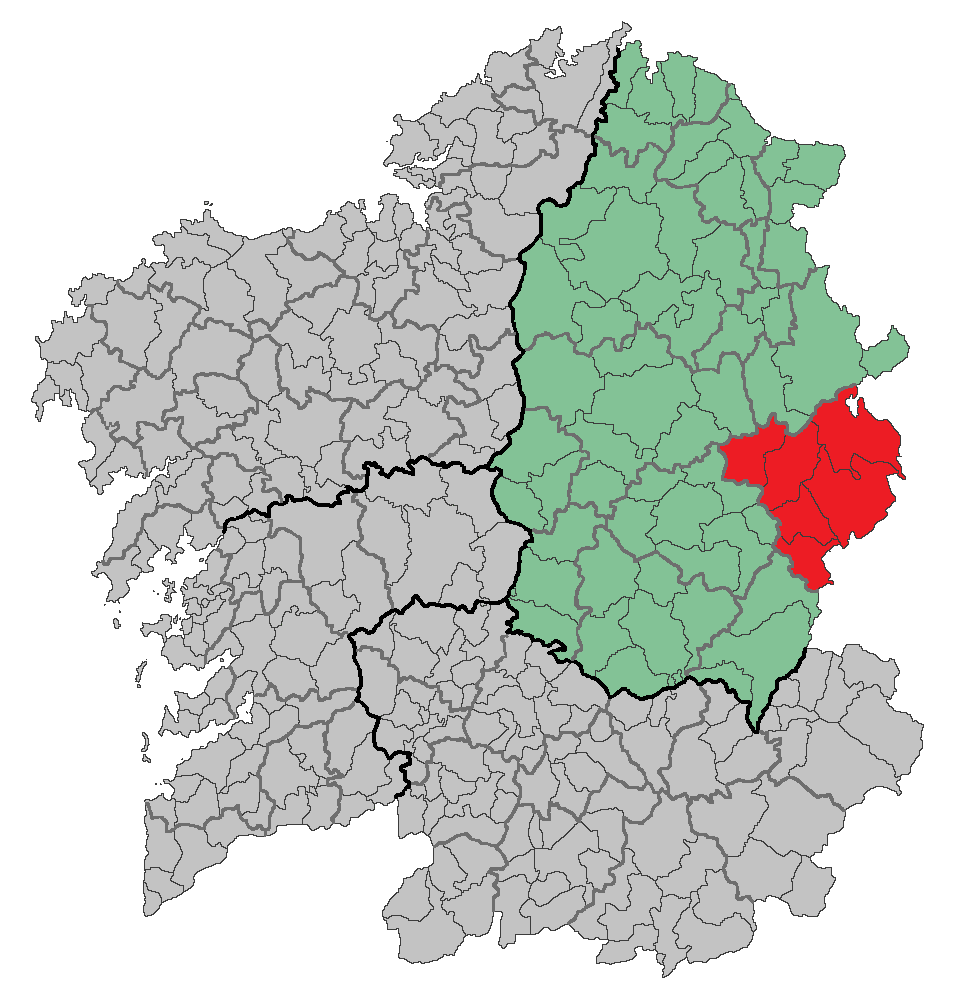
- Country: Spain
- Autonomous community: Galicia
- Province: Lugo
- Capital: Becerreá
- Municipalities: List: Becerreá, As Nogais, Baralla, Cervantes, Navia de Suarna, Pedrafita do Cebreiro

Area
  - Total: 907 km^{2} (350 sq mi)

Population
  - Total: 13,888
  - Density: 15.3/km^{2} (39.7/sq mi)
- Time zone: UTC+1 (CET)
  - Summer (DST): UTC+2 (CEST)

Os Ancares is a comarca in the Galician Province of Lugo. The overall population of this local region is 13,888 (2005). It is formed by the municipality of Candín with two slopes, Sil and Navia, and separated by the Ancares pass.

Today, Os Ancares also refers to a broader region that straddles the provinces of Lugo and León. The Spanish term Los Ancares Lucenses (i.e. pertaining to Lugo) is sometimes used to refer to the Galician Ancares, thus distinguishing them from Los Ancares Leoneses (i.e. pertaining to León). A range of mountains called in Galician the "Serra dos Ancares" forms the border.

== Geography ==
Os Ancares has mountain valley high altitudes and steep slopes located in the northwest of El Bierzo. The main river that gives name to the region is the Ancares river, a tributary of the river Cúa which, in turn, is of the Sil. This river began as Cuiña and has tributaries from the rivers Miravalles and de la Vega and streams from Penedón, Baliñas and the Cross. Traditionally, only the higher towns of high of Ancares are called Ancareses. Apart from San Martin de Moreda and until San Pedro de Olleros, where the river flows into the Cúa, is where they are considered bercianos.

The altitude varies between the valley from 800 to 900 meters, and the highest peaks, which are about 2,000 meters (Pico Miravalles at 1,969 meters).

The climate is mountainous, with high rainfall and moderate temperatures.

== Ecology ==
Os Ancares Lucenses y Montes de Cervantes, Navia y Becerrea has been declared a biosphere reserve.

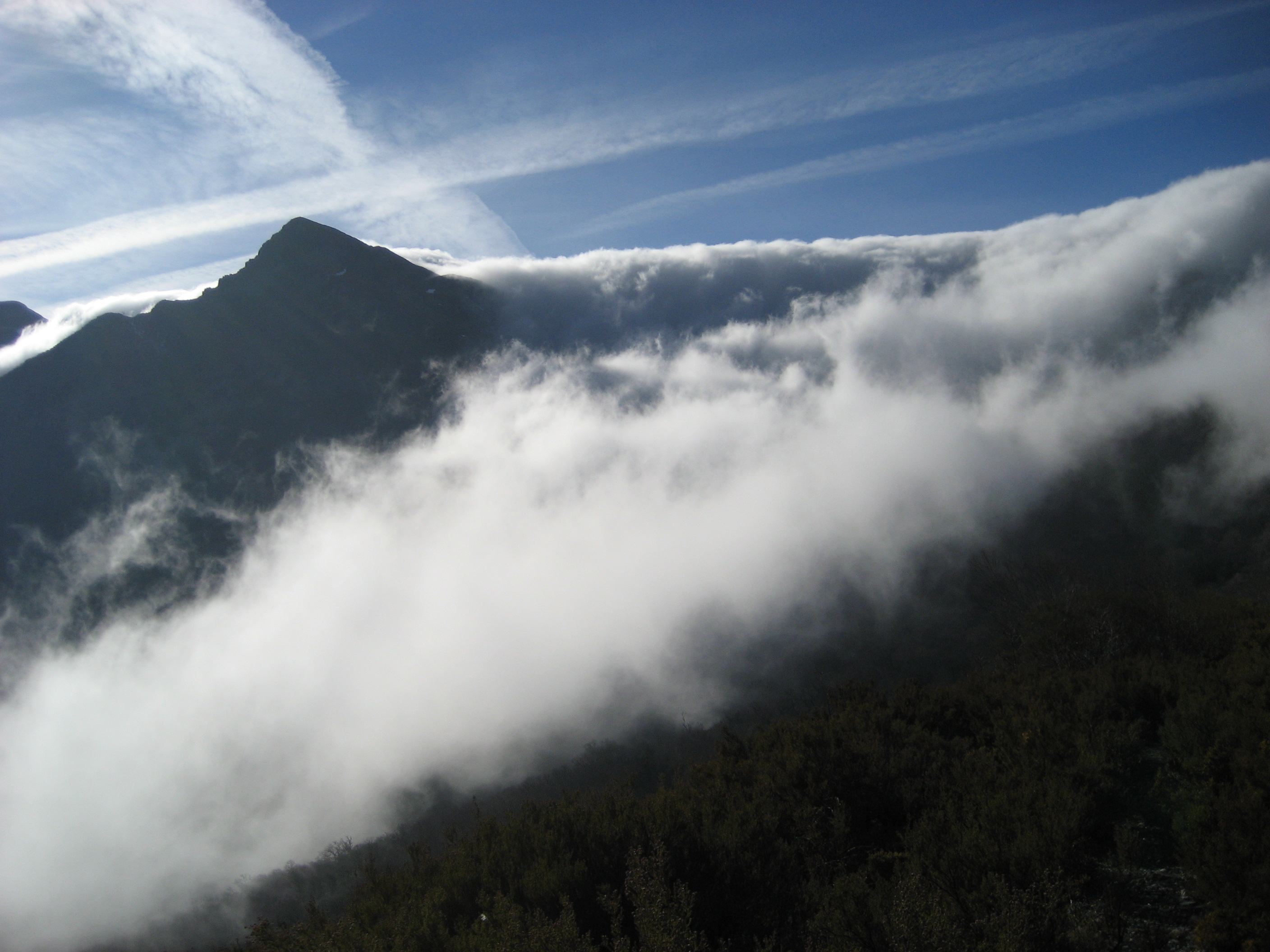
Mountain range that separates Ancares from Galicia

== Economy ==
The Ancareses have a reputation for good traders, dedicating themselves in the past. Many of them trade with the valleys and neighboring regions. This was probably forced by the poor performance of agriculture due to poor land and poor quality of the products. Cabbage cultivation from which an Ancares broth is made is traditional in this region.

== Municipalities ==
Becerreá, As Nogais, Baralla, Cervantes, Navia de Suarna and Pedrafita do Cebreiro.
