= Quiroga, Galicia =

Municipality in Galicia, Spain

Quiroga
- Municipality
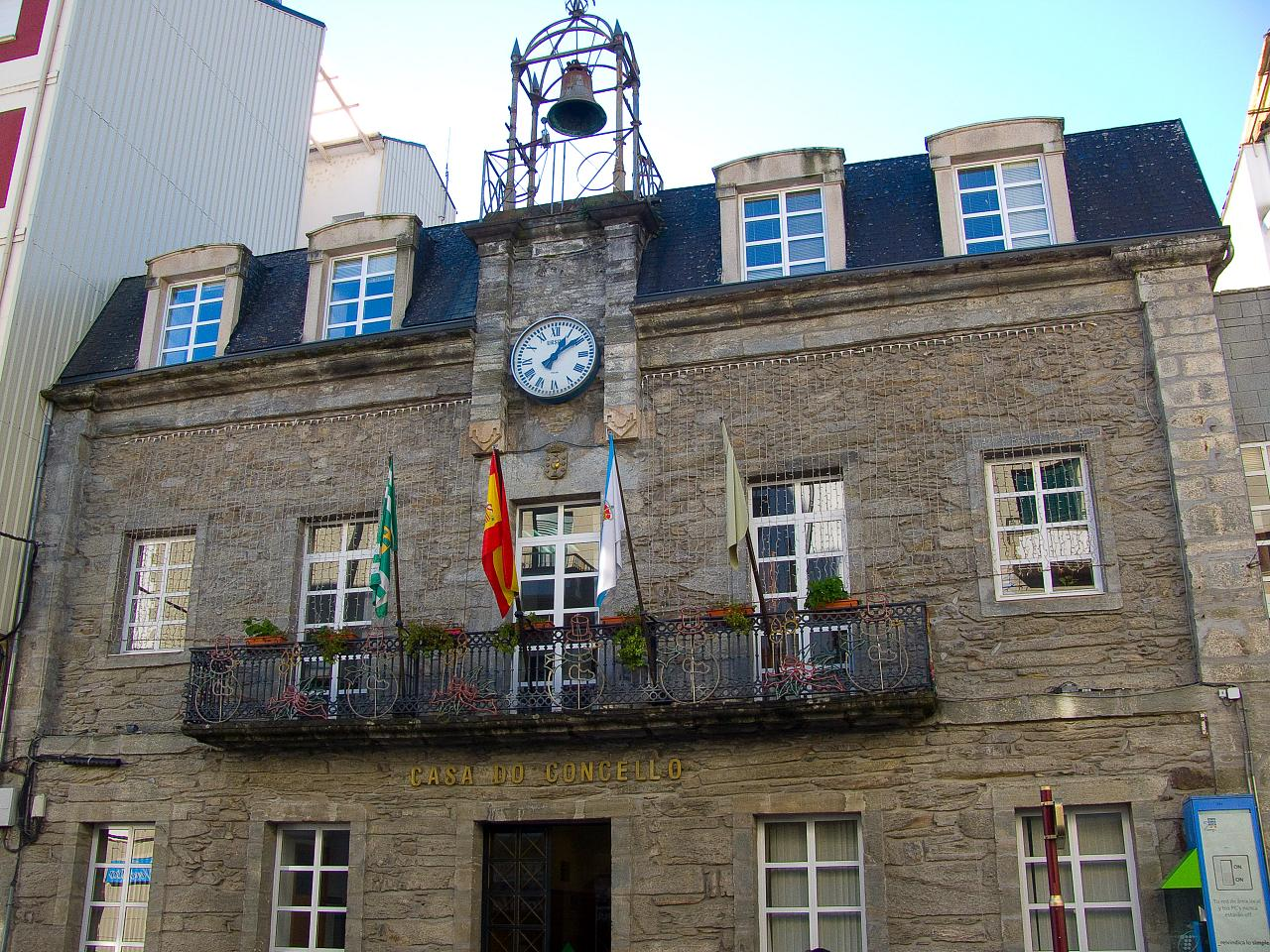
- Town hall.

- Flag Coat of arms

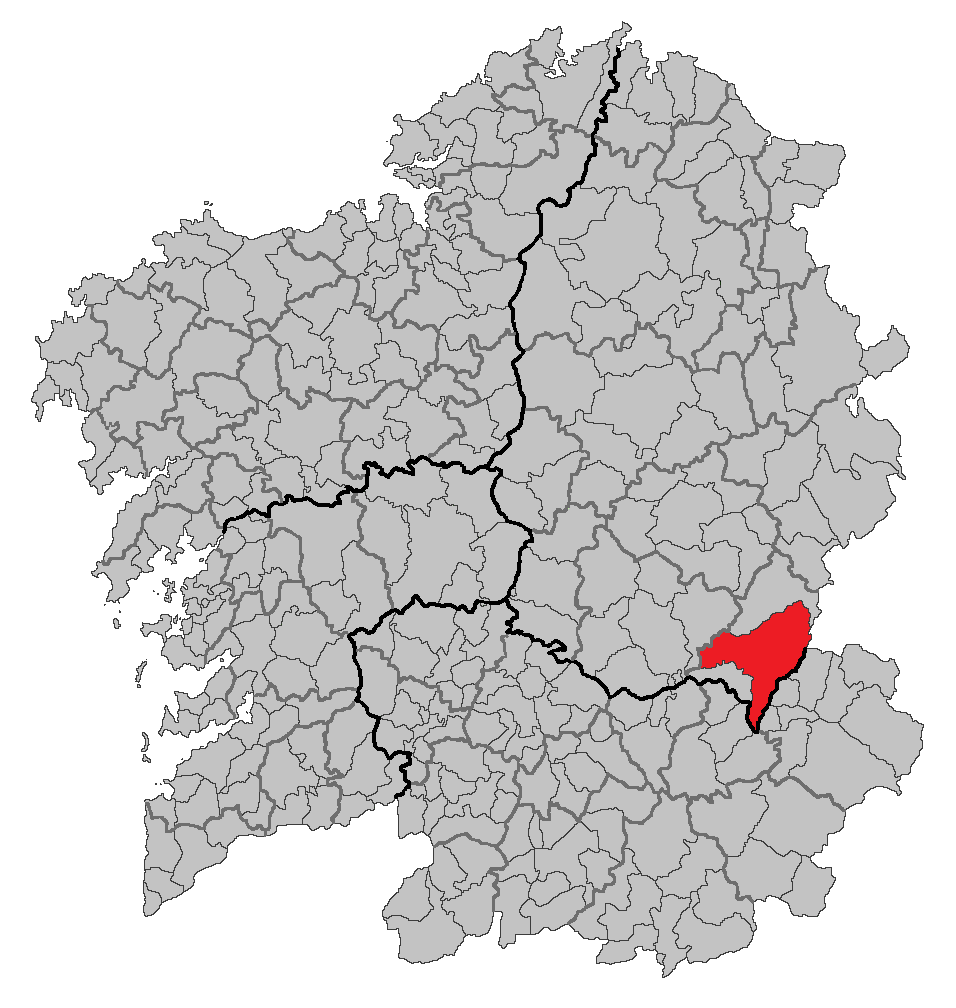
- Location of Quiroga.

- Location in Spain Quiroga (Galicia)
- Coordinates: 42°29′N 7°16′W
- Country: Spain
- Autonomous community: Galicia
- Province: Lugo
- Comarca: Quiroga

Government
  - Alcalde: José Luis Rivera (Partido Independientes x Quiroga)

Area
  - Total: 317.56 km^{2} (122.61 sq mi)

Population (2024)
  - Total: 3,099
  - Density: 9.759/km^{2} (25.28/sq mi)
- Demonym: Quirogués
- Time zone: UTC+1 (CET)
  - Summer (DST): UTC+2 (CEST)
- Postal code: 27320
- Website: Official website

Quiroga (Galician pronunciation: [kiˈɾɔɣɐ]) is a municipality in the province of Lugo, in the autonomous community of Galicia, Spain. It is the capital of the comarca of Quiroga. The south side of Quiroga is bordered by the river Sil.

The main economic activities are agriculture which is mostly grapes and olives, animal breeding and mining.

Olives are grown in Quiroga, where it has been a tradition, as the climate is optimal for growing them. In 2020, Quiroga produced 40,000 liters of olive oil.

The municipality of Quiroga is an interesting natural area (more than 50% of the total area is protected).
