= Villarbón =

- Locality
- Location within Province of León Location within Castile and León Location within Spain
- Coordinates: 42°46′50″N 6°42′35″W
- Country: Spain
- Autonomous community: Castile and León
- Province: Province of León
- Municipality: Valle de Ancares
- Elevation: 1,103 m (3,619 ft)

Population
  - Total: 8

Villarbón is a locality located in the municipality of Valle de Ancares, in the province of León, Castile and León, Spain. As of 2020, it has a population of 8.

== Geography ==
Villarbón is located 140km west-northwest of León, Spain.
