= Espinareda de Ancares =

- Locality
- Location within Province of León Location within Castile and León Location within Spain
- Coordinates: 42°49′52″N 6°43′26″W
- Country: Spain
- Autonomous community: Castile and León
- Province: Province of León
- Municipality: Valle de Ancares
- Elevation: 934 m (3,064 ft)

Population
  - Total: 8

Espinareda de Ancares is a hamlet located in the municipality of Valle de Ancares, in the province of León, Castile and León, Spain. As of 2020, it has a population of 8.

== Geography ==
Espinareda de Ancares is located 144km west-northwest of León, Spain.
