= Villasumil =

- Locality
- Location within Province of León Location within Castile and León Location within Spain
- Coordinates: 42°49′11″N 6°41′40″W
- Country: Spain
- Autonomous community: Castile and León
- Province: Province of León
- Municipality: Valle de Ancares
- Elevation: 993 m (3,258 ft)

Population
  - Total: 7

Villasumil is a hamlet located in the municipality of Valle de Ancares, in the province of León, Castile and León, Spain. As of 2020, it has a population of 7.

== Geography ==
Villasumil is located 142km west-northwest of León, Spain.
