= Sorbeira =

- Locality
- Location within Province of León Location within Castile and León Location within Spain
- Coordinates: 42°48′37″N 6°42′58″W
- Country: Spain
- Autonomous community: Castile and León
- Province: Province of León
- Municipality: Valle de Ancares
- Elevation: 916 m (3,005 ft)

Population
  - Total: 34

Sorbeira is a locality located in the municipality of Valle de Ancares, in the province of León, Castile and León, Spain. As of 2020, it has a population of 34.

== Geography ==
Sorbeira is located 140km west-northwest of León, Spain.
