= Navia de Suarna =

Coordinates: 42°57′54″N 7°0′16″W

- Municipality
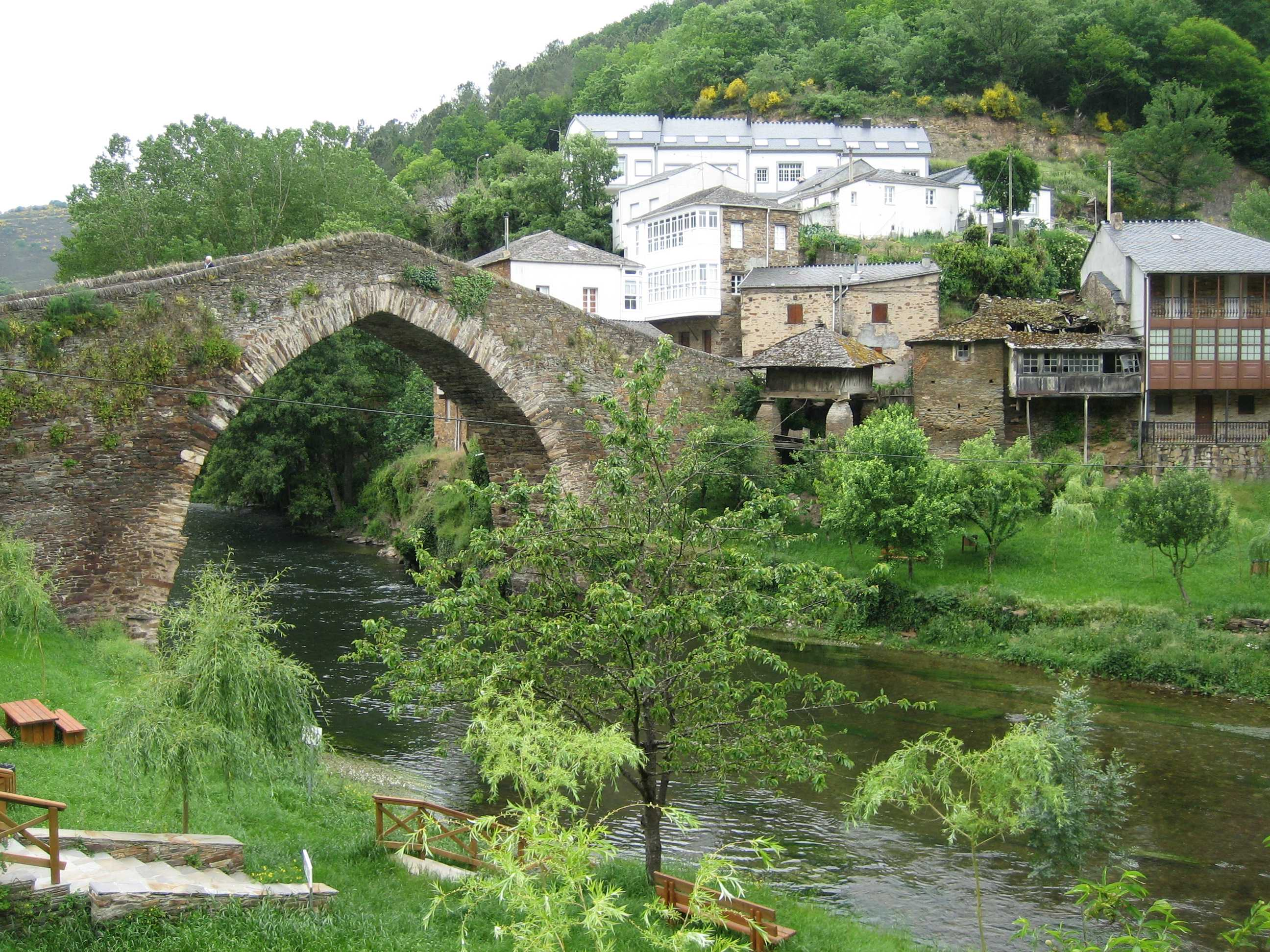
- Medieval bridge of A Pobra (Navia de Suarna).

- Coat of arms

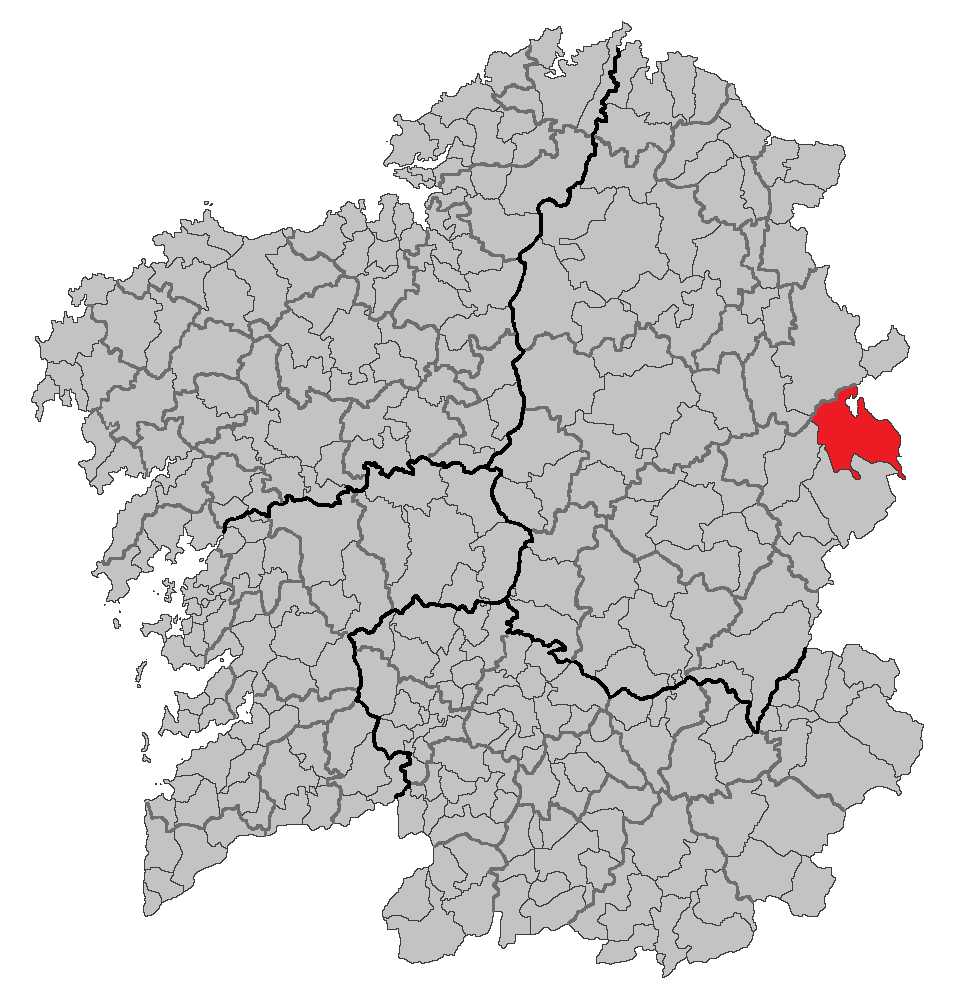
- Location of Navia de Suarna

- Location in Spain
- Country: Spain
- Autonomous community: Galicia
- Province: Lugo
- Comarca: Os Ancares

Government
  - Alcalde: José Fernández Fernández (PSdeG)

Population (2025-01-01)
  - Total: 971
- Demonym(s): naviego, -a
- Time zone: UTC+1 (CET)
  - Summer (DST): UTC+2 (CEST)
- Postal code: 27650
- Website: Official website

Navia de Suarna, is a municipality in the province of Lugo, in the autonomous community of Galicia, northwestern Spain. It belongs to the comarca of Os Ancares.

== Notable people ==
- Eva Xaním (born 1994) – writer
