= Balouta =

- Locality
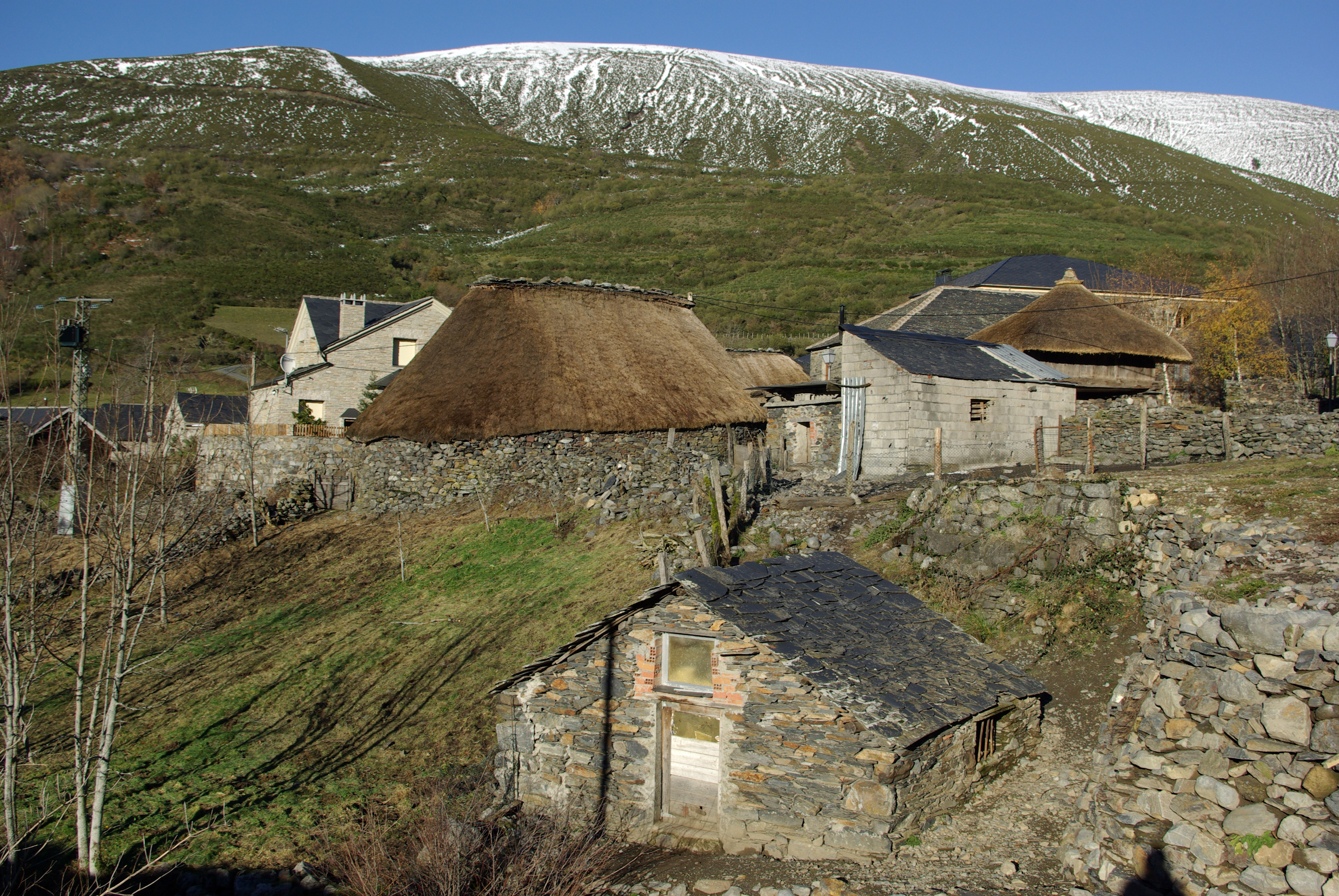

- Location within Province of León Location within Castile and León Location within Spain
- Coordinates: 42°53′20″N 6°48′18″W
- Country: Spain
- Autonomous community: Castile and León
- Province: Province of León
- Municipality: Valle de Ancares
- Elevation: 1,104 m (3,622 ft)

Population
  - Total: 19

Balouta is a locality located in the municipality of Valle de Ancares, in the province of León, Castile and León, Spain. As of 2020, it has a population of 19.

== Geography ==
Balouta is located 160km west-northwest of León, Spain.
