= Suertes =

- Locality
- Location within Province of León Location within Castile and León Location within Spain
- Coordinates: 42°50′16″N 6°43′56″W
- Country: Spain
- Autonomous community: Castile and León
- Province: Province of León
- Municipality: Valle de Ancares
- Elevation: 939 m (3,081 ft)

Population
  - Total: 35

Suertes is a hamlet located in the municipality of Valle de Ancares, in the province of León, Castile and León, Spain. As of 2023, it has a population of 35 .

== Geography ==
Suertes is located 144 km west-northwest of León, Spain.
