= Pereda de Ancares =

- Locality
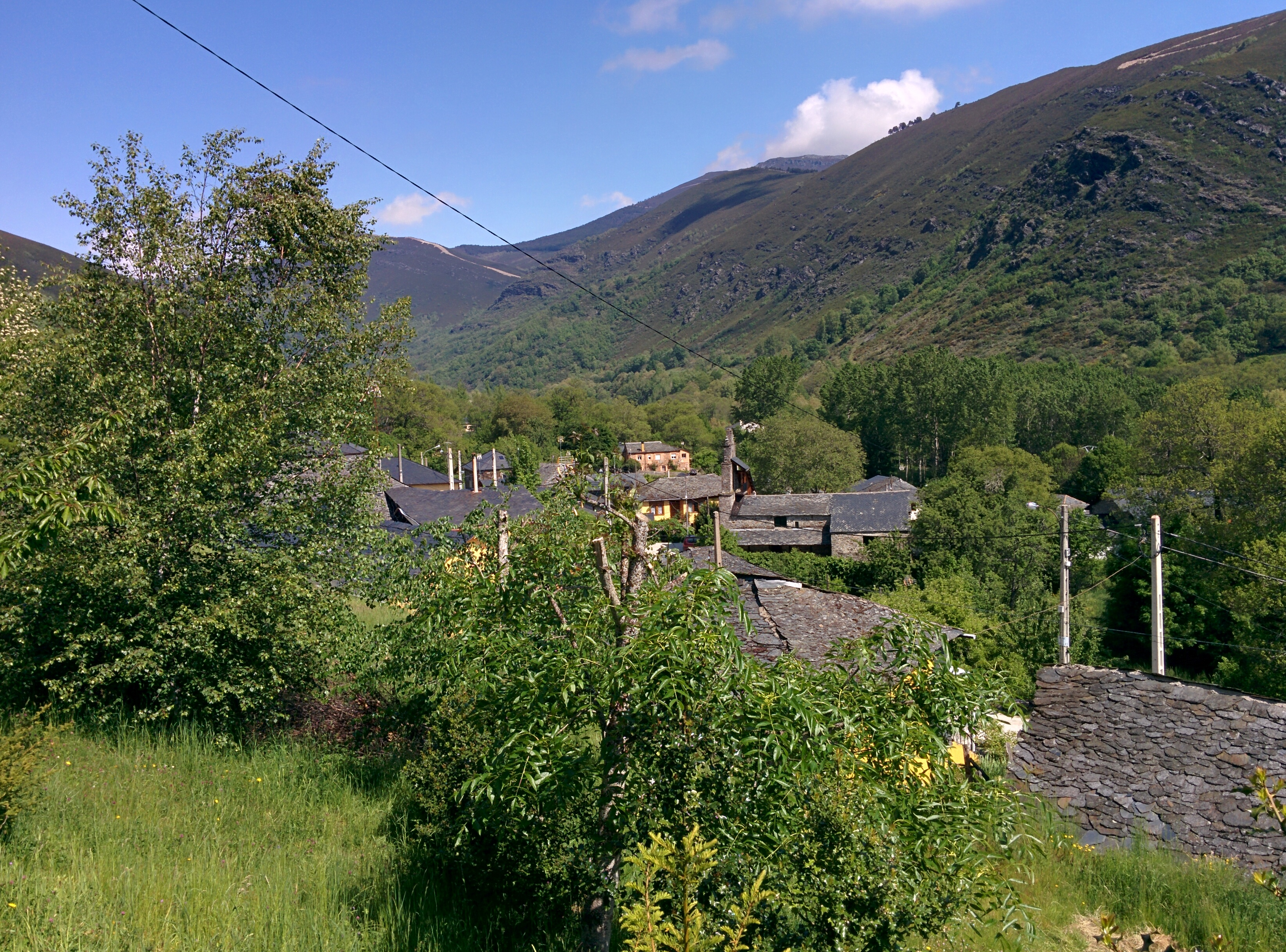

- Location within Province of León Location within Castile and León Location within Spain
- Coordinates: 42°49′32″N 6°44′42″W
- Country: Spain
- Autonomous community: Castile and León
- Province: Province of León
- Municipality: Valle de Ancares
- Elevation: 937 m (3,074 ft)

Population
  - Total: 43

Pereda de Ancares is a locality located in the municipality of Valle de Ancares, in the province of León, Castile and León, Spain. In 2020, it had a population of 43.

== Geography ==
Pereda de Ancares is located 143km west-northwest of León, Spain.
