= Baralla =

Municipality in the province of Lugo, Spain

- Municipality
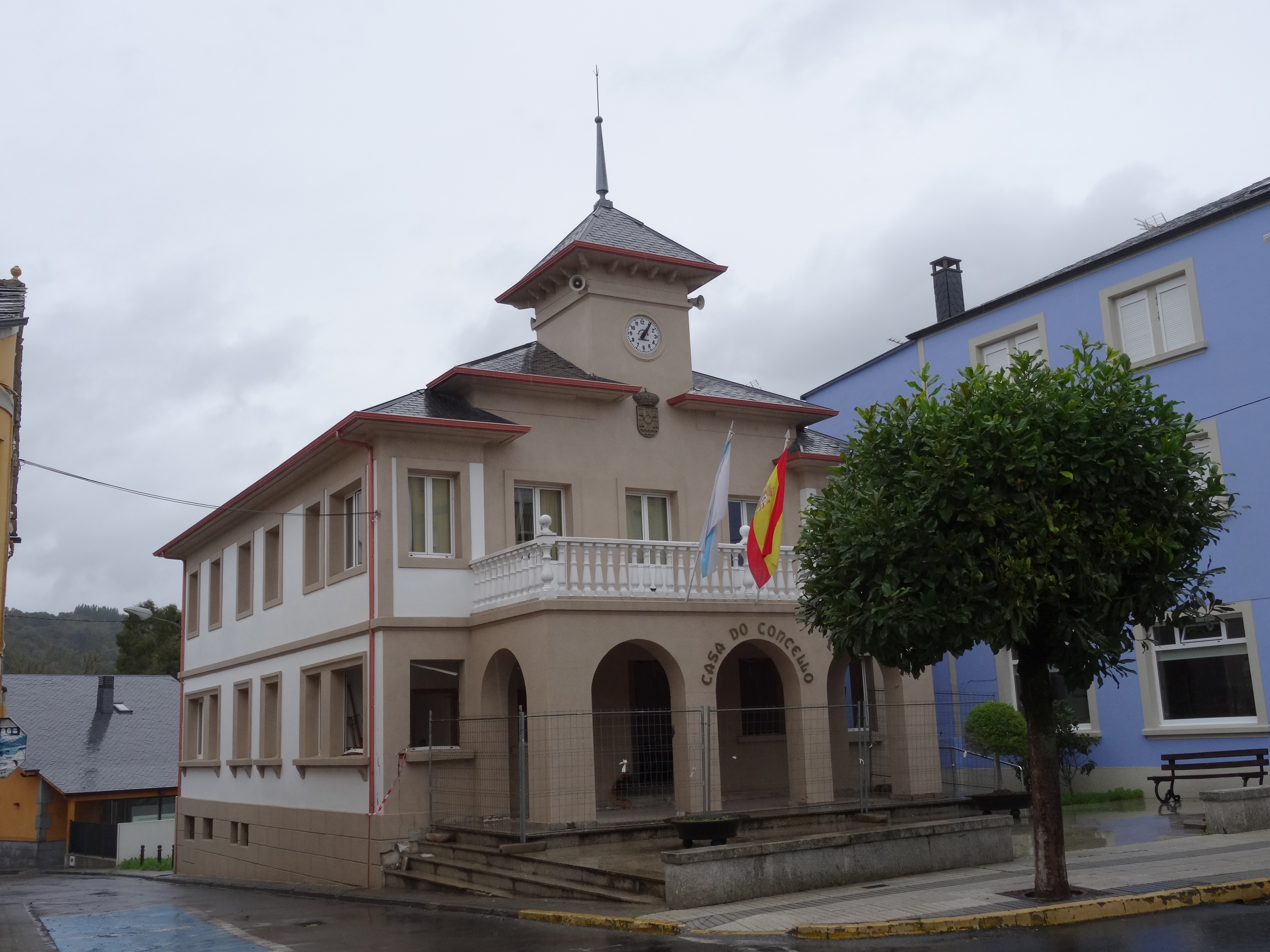
- Town hall.

- Flag Coat of arms

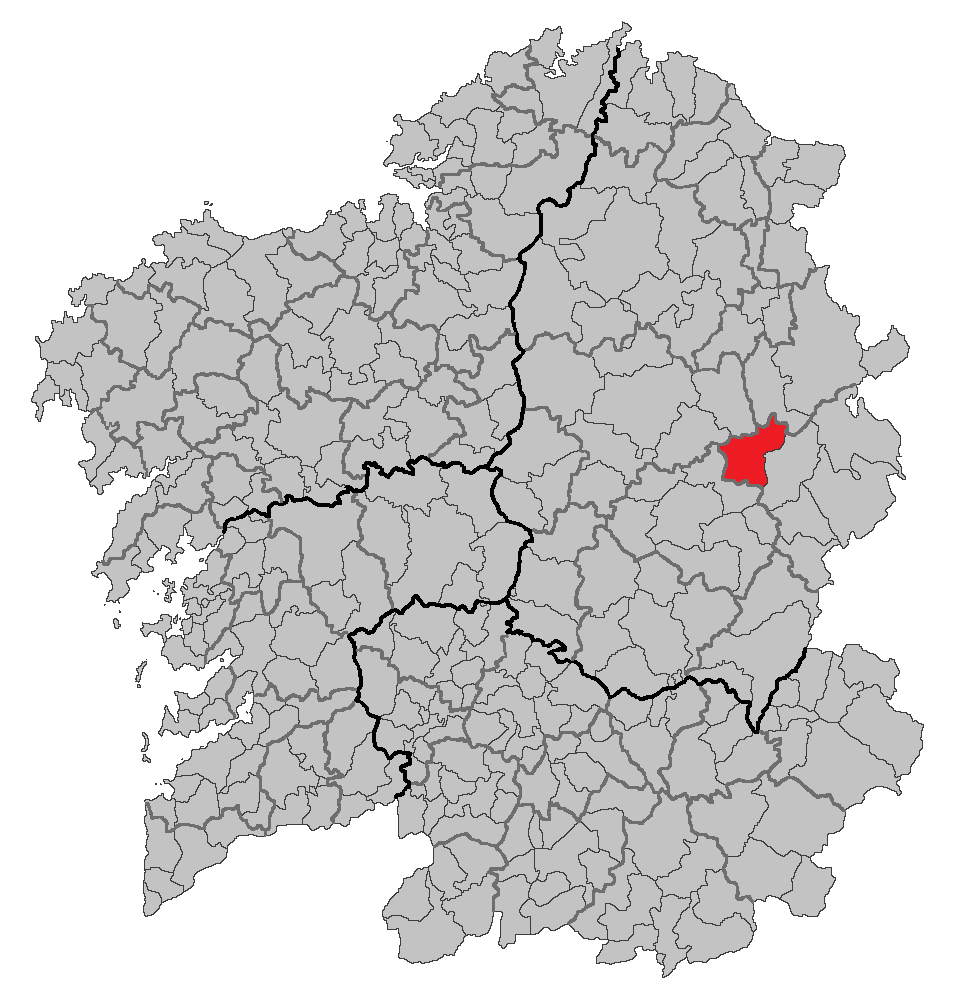
- Location of Baralla

- Location in Spain
- Country: Spain
- Autonomous community: Galicia
- Province: Lugo
- Comarca: Os Ancares

Government
  - Alcalde: Miguel González (Partido Popular de Baralla)

Area
  - Total: 141.16 km^{2} (54.50 sq mi)

Population (2024)
  - Total: 2,484
- Demonym: Barallense
- Time zone: UTC+1 (CET)
  - Summer (DST): UTC+2 (CEST)
- Postal code: 27680
- Website: Official website

Baralla is a municipality in the province of Lugo, in the autonomous community of Galicia, Spain. It belongs to the comarca of Os Ancares and covers 30 villages. Until the late 1970s it was called Neira of Jusá.

== Location ==
To the riverside of Neira it borders Becerreá to the east and O Corgo to the west. The municipality is located in the valley of its river.

== History ==
Originally it was a Celtic village which was completely romanized after the foundation of Lugo. In the Middle Ages, the lords of Espiña, Gallego and others prevented the penetration of Almanzor into the razzia valleys.

== Rural Tourism ==
All the zone is rural, the municipality includes 52 villages.

=== Monuments ===
Pazo de Espiña, Obelisk monument to Magín Espiña. Celebrations: San Vitorio, at the end of August.

== Villages/Hamlets ==
All listed with their respective Saints

- Aranza (Santiago)
- Arroxo (San Juan)
- Baralla (Santa Mª Magdalena)
- Berselos (San Martín)
- Costantín (Santa María)
- Covas (Santiago)
- Ferreiros (San Pedro)
- Francos (San Salvador)
- Guimarei (San Tomé)
- Laxes (San Pedro)
- Lebruxo (San Tomé)
- Lexo (San Juan)
- Pacios (Santa María)
- Pedrafita de Camporredondo (San Juan)
- Penarrubia (Santa María)
- Piñeira (San Salvador)
- Pol (Santa María)
- Pousada (Santiago)
- Recesende (San Cirilo)
- Riba de Neira (Santalla)
- San Martín de Neira de Rei (San Pedro)
- San Miguel de Neira de Rei (San Miguel)
- San Esteban (San Esteban)
- Sixirei (San Pedro)
- Sobrado do Picato (Santa Cruz)
- Teixeira (San Pedro)
- Vale (San Jorge)
- Vilachambre (Santa Marina)
- Villarpunteiro (Santa María)
- Villartelín (Santa Eufemia)
