= Lumeras =

Spanish Hamlet in the Province of León

- Locality
- Location within Province of León Location within Castile and León Location within Spain
- Coordinates: 42°47′38″N 6°40′14″W
- Country: Spain
- Autonomous community: Castile and León
- Province: Province of León
- Municipality: Valle de Ancares
- Elevation: 915 m (3,002 ft)

Population
  - Total: 26

Lumeras is a hamlet located in the municipality of Valle de Ancares, in the province of León, Castile and León, Spain. As of 2020, it has a population of 26.

== Geography ==
Lumeras is located 138km west-northwest of León, Spain.
