= Becerreá =

Coordinates: 42°51′N 7°10′W

- Municipality
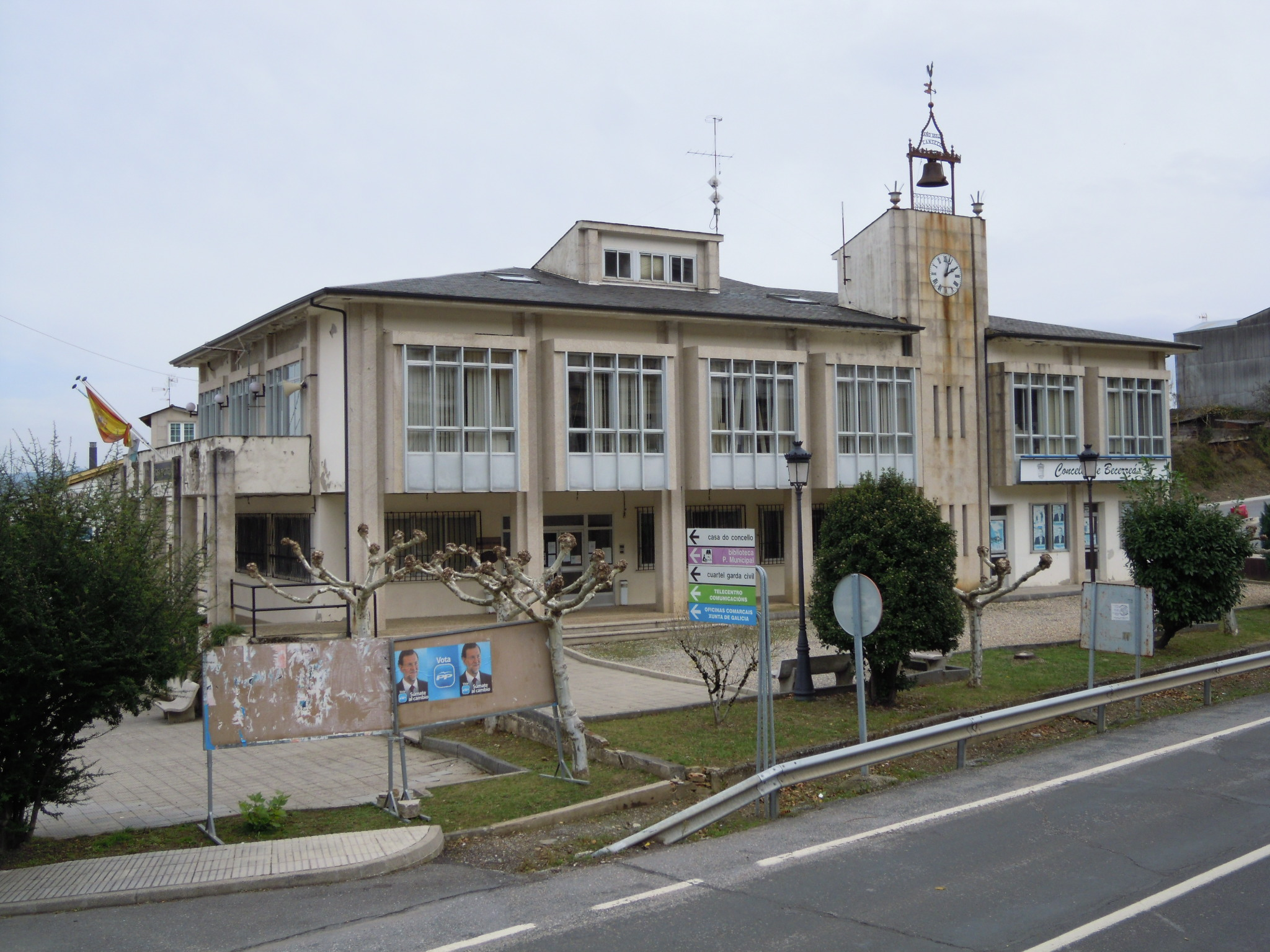
- Town hall.

- Coat of arms

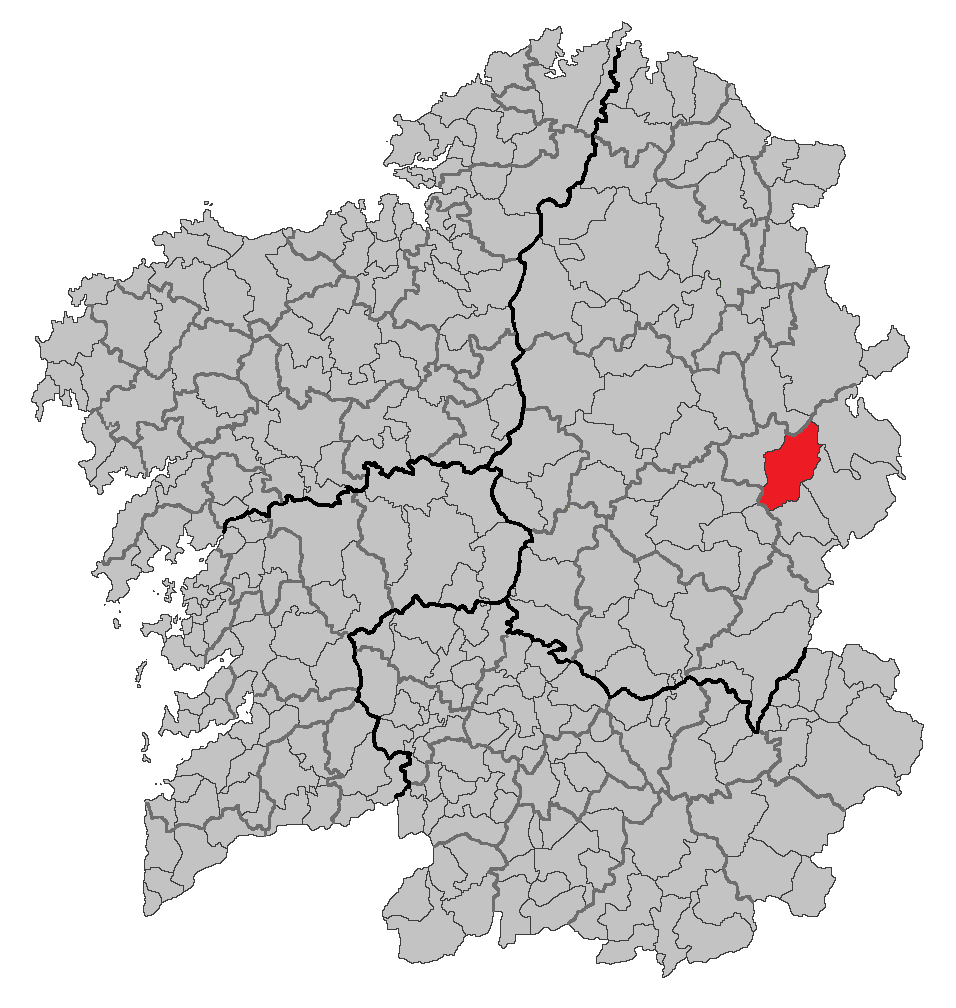
- Location of Becerreá

- Location in Spain
- Country: Spain
- Autonomous community: Galicia
- Province: Lugo
- Comarca: Os Ancares

Government
  - Alcalde: Manuel Martínez (Ga.S)

Population (2025-01-01)
  - Total: 2,836
- Time zone: UTC+1 (CET)
  - Summer (DST): UTC+2 (CEST)
- Postal code: 27...

Becerreá is a municipality in the province of Lugo, in the autonomous community of Galicia, Spain. It belongs to the comarca of Os Ancares.

Situated in the eastern mountain range of the province, Becerreá occupies an extension of 173.3 km^{2} and forms part of the Region of Los Ancares, which contains the departure points of the access routes. It accounts for 113 entities of population, and 26 parishes (Agueira, Armesto, Becerreá, Cadoalla, Cascallá, Cereixal, Cruzul, Ferreiros de Balboa, Fontarón, Furco, Guilfrei, Guillen, Liber, Morcelle, Oselle, Ousón, Pando, Penamaior, Quintá, Sevane, Vilar de Ouson, Veiga, Vilacha, Vilaiz, Vilamane, Vilouta). The town is part of the Via Küning; an historic route of the Camino de Santiago, offering an alternative path to the more popular French Way, particularly for the last stretch into Santiago de Compostela. It follows the original route described by the German monk Hermann Künig, incorporating historical sections and avoiding challenging terrain.

== Demography ==
- Population: 2.827 inhabitants (INE 2018).

== Geography ==
- Altitude: 668 meters.
- Latitude: 42° 51' N
- Longitude: 007° 10' W
