= Valle de Ancares =

Candín
- Location within Spain
- Coordinates: 42°49′0″N 6°43′41″W
- Country: Spain
- Autonomous community: Castile and León
- Province: León
- Comarca: El Bierzo
- Municipality: Valle de Ancares

Government
  - Mayor: José Antonio Álvarez Cachón (PP)

Area
  - Total: 140.90 km^{2} (54.40 sq mi)
- Elevation: 888 m (2,913 ft)

Population (2025-01-01)
  - Total: 256
  - Density: 1.82/km^{2} (4.71/sq mi)
- Time zone: UTC+1 (CET)
  - Summer (DST): UTC+2 (CEST)
- Postal Code: 24433
- Telephone prefix: 987
- Climate: Csb
- Website: Ayto. de Candín

Valle de Ancares formerly known as Candín (as of August 23,2023) (Spanish pronunciation: [kanˈdin]) is a village and municipality located in the region of El Bierzo (the province of León, Castile and León, Spain) . According to the 2025 census (INE), the municipality has a population of 256 inhabitants.

== Towns ==
- Balouta
- Espinareda de Ancares
- Lumeras
- Pereda de Ancares
- Sorbeira
- Suarbol
- Suertes
- Tejedo de Ancares
- Villarbón
- Villasumil

== Festivities ==
- Candín: La Cruz, San Lorenzo, San Quintín, and Santa Bárbara.
- Espinareda de Ancares: Virgen de los Dolores.
- Lumeras: San Tirso and San Pedro.
- Pereda de Ancares: San Jorge.
- Sorbeira: El Carmen and San Esteban,
- Suárbol: Santa María.
- Suertes: San Roque and Carnavales.
- Tejedo de Ancares: San Juan.
- Villasumil: Nuestra Señora and San Bernardo.
