= Tejedo de Ancares =

- Locality
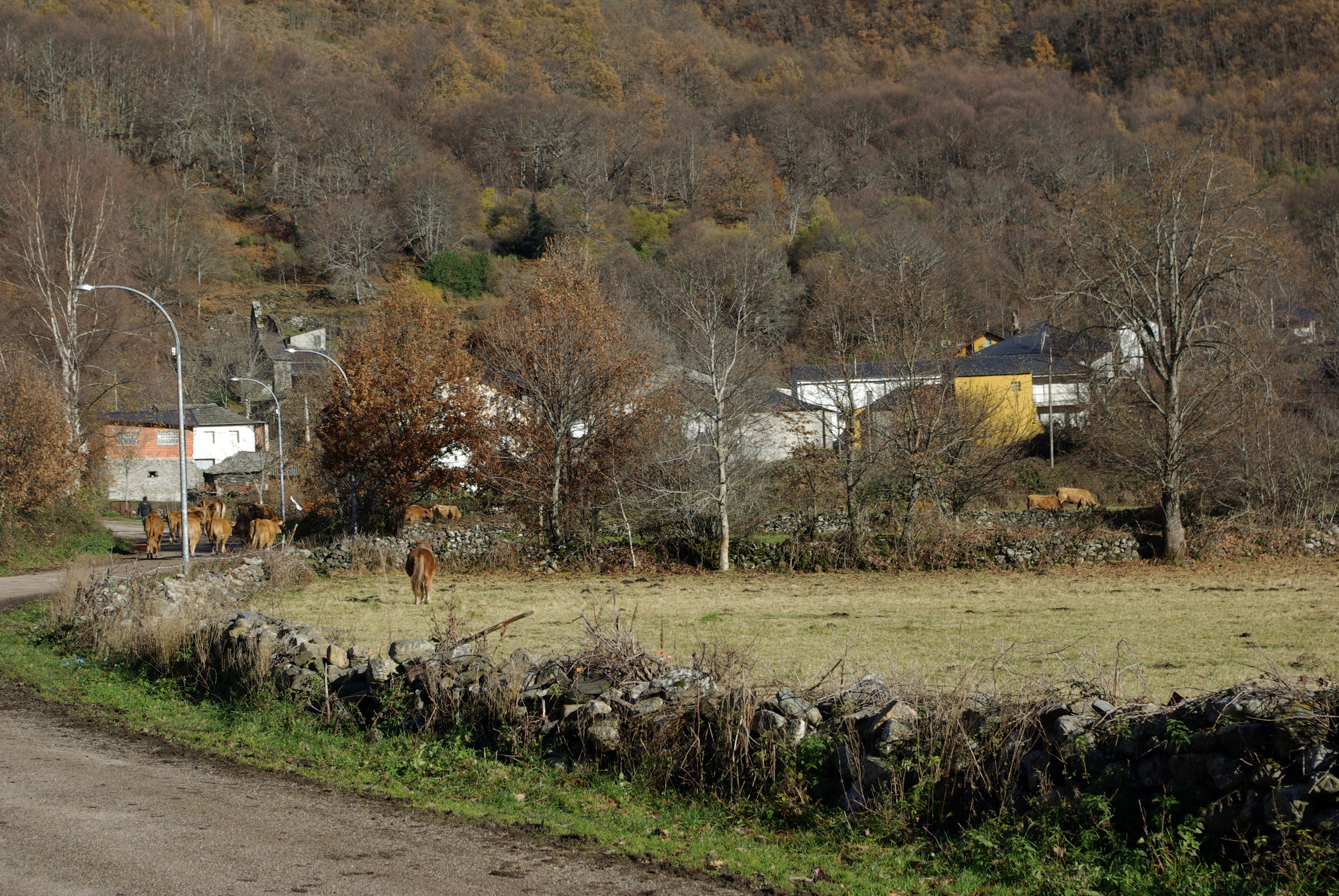

- Location within Province of León Location within Castile and León Location within Spain
- Coordinates: 42°50′29″N 6°45′44″W
- Country: Spain
- Autonomous community: Castile and León
- Province: Province of León
- Municipality: Valle de Ancares
- Elevation: 981 m (3,219 ft)

Population
  - Total: 15

Tejedo de Ancares is a locality located in the municipality of Valle de Ancares, in the province of León, Castile and León, Spain. As of 2020, it has a population of 15.

== Geography ==
Tejedo de Ancares is located 146km west-northwest of León, Spain.
