= Galicia Sempre =

Galicia Sempre Always Galicia
- President: Manuel Martínez Núñez
- Founded: March 24, 2019
- Headquarters: Av. Madrid, 1 27640 Becerreá, Lugo
- Ideology: Social democracy Galicianism
- Political position: Centre-left
- National affiliation: Spanish Socialist Workers' Party
- Colors: Green
- Slogan: No strings attached
- Congreso de los Diputados Galician seats: 0 / 23
- Spanish Senate Galician seats: 0 / 19
- Galician Parliament: 0 / 75
- Provincial deputation of Lugo: 0 / 35
- Mayors: 1 / 313
- Municipal councils: 9 / 3,721

Website
- galicia-sempre.es

Galicia Sempre (English: Always Galicia, Ga.S) is a centre-left political party in Galicia, Spain, led by the mayor of Becerreá and ex-MP Manuel Martínez Núñez.

== History ==
The party was created as the result of a split in the Lugo branch of the Spanish Socialist Workers' Party (PSOE). The party defines itself as social democratic and galicianist. In the municipal elections of 2019 Ga.S won 9 local seats in three municipalities: Becerreá, Sarria and Meira.

== Electoral performance ==
| Election | Votes | % | Mayors | Local seats |
|---|---|---|---|---|
| 2019 | 1824 | 0.13 | 1 / 313 | 9 / 3,721 |
