= Ribas de Sil =

Coordinates: 42°25′N 7°41′W

- Municipality
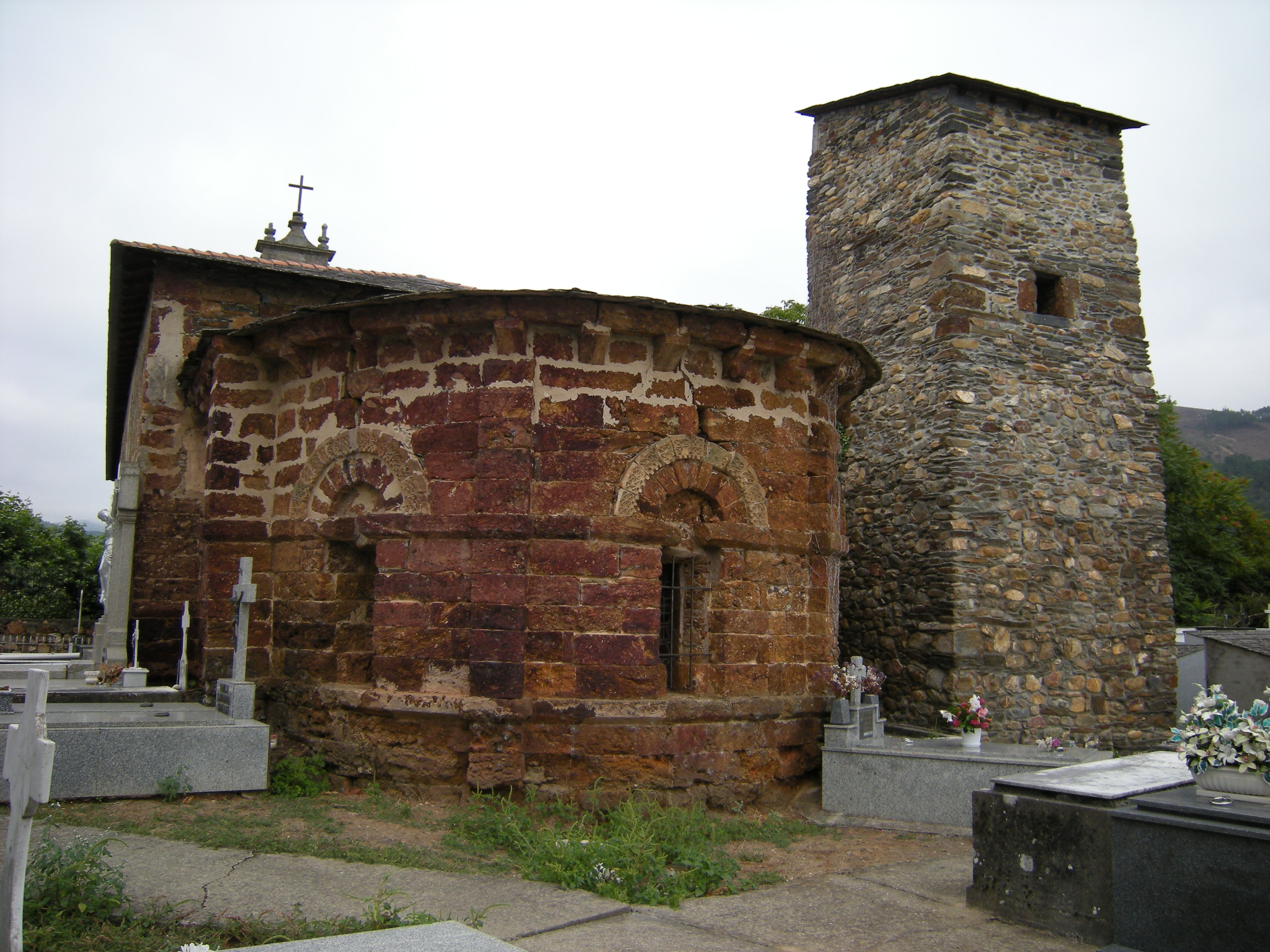
- Church of San Clodio de Ribas de Sil.

- Flag Coat of arms

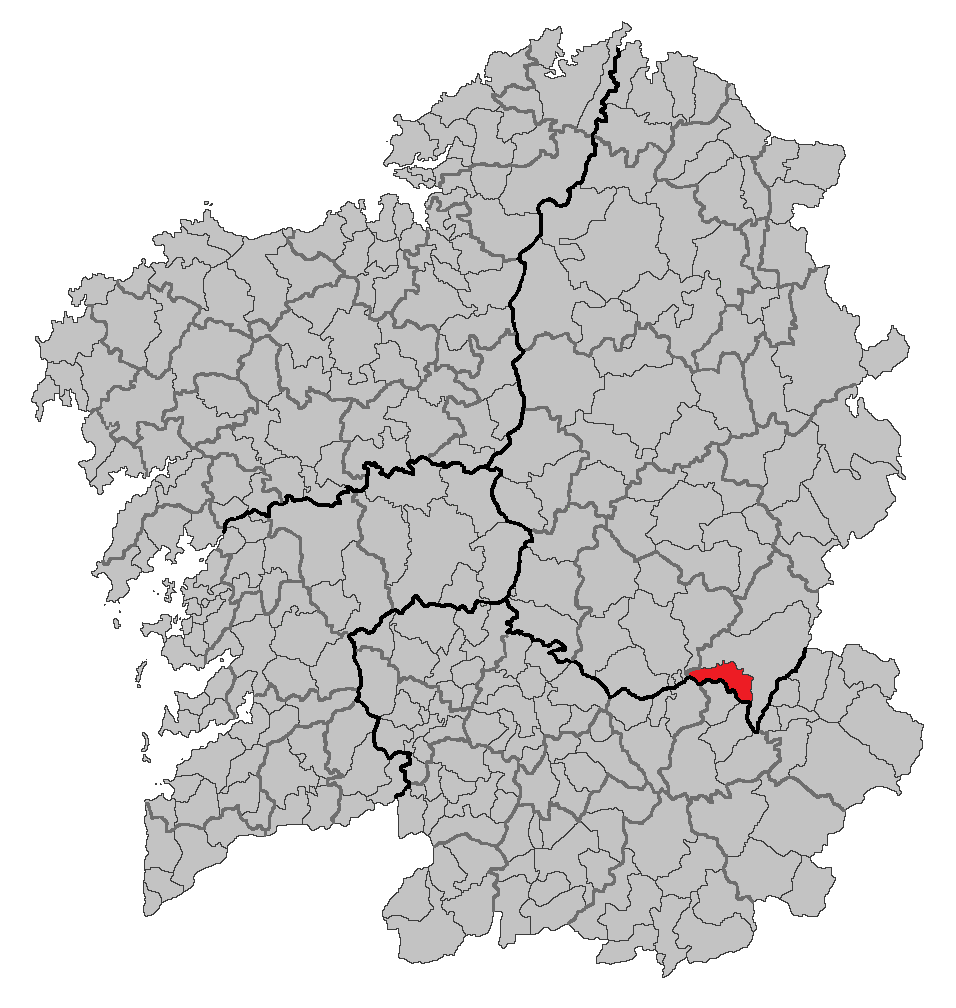
- Location of Ribas de Sil.

- Location in Spain
- Country: Spain
- Autonomous community: Galicia
- Province: Lugo
- Comarca: Quiroga

Government
  - Alcalde: Miguel Ángel Sotuela Vega (PSdeG-PSOE)

Population (2025-01-01)
  - Total: 894
- Demonym: ribasilense
- Time zone: UTC+1 (CET)
  - Summer (DST): UTC+2 (CEST)
- Postal code: 27310
- Website: Official website

Ribas de Sil is a town and municipality in the province of Lugo, in the autonomous community of Galicia, Spain. It is part of the comarca of Quiroga.

The town is not directly related to the monastery of Santo Estevo de Ribas de Sil, which is currently used as a parador and is located further west. The monastery is first mentioned in the 10th century, but is believed to have been founded here in between the 6th and 7th centuries.
