= Teresa Moure =

Galician writer

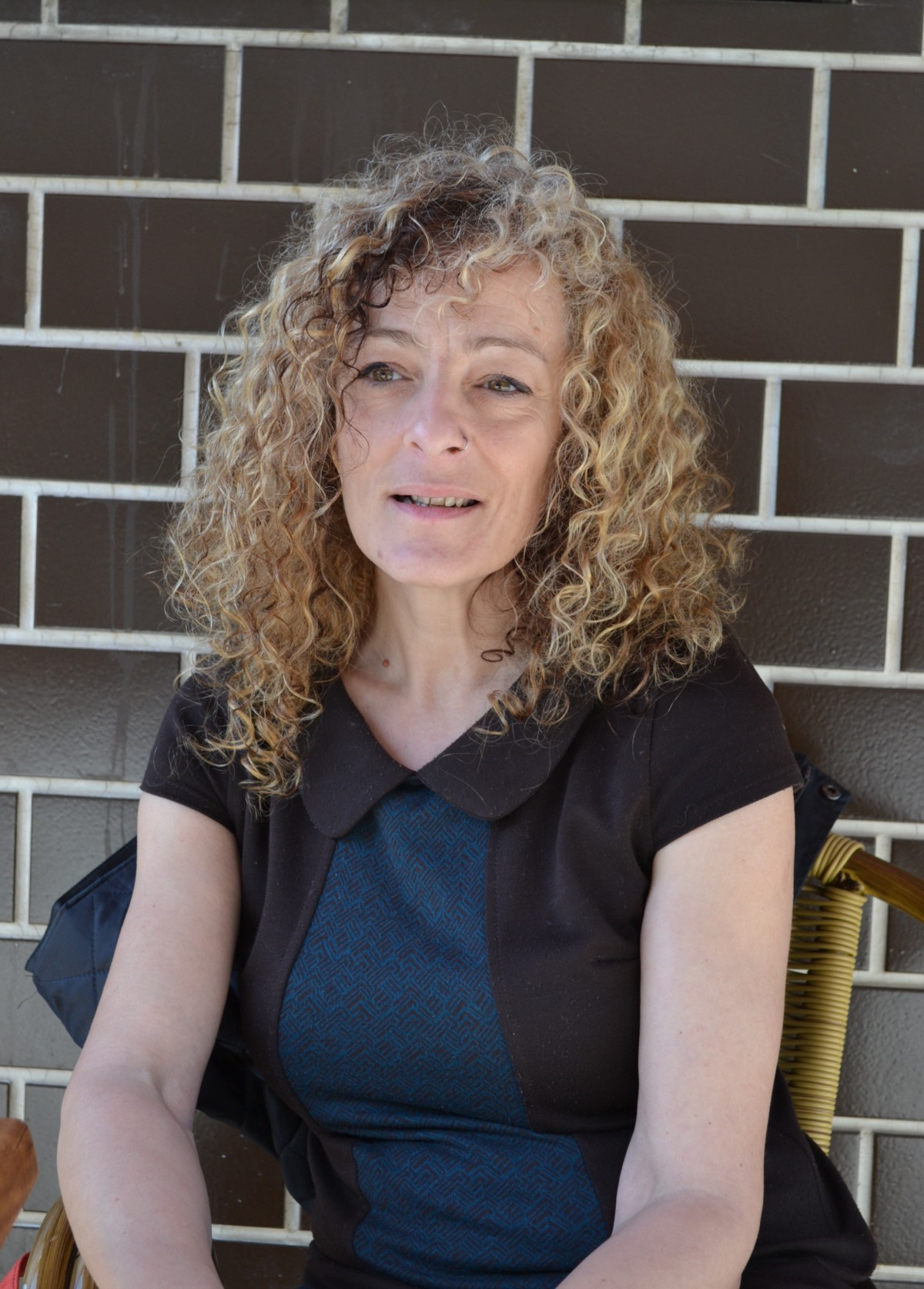
- Teresa Moure in 2014
- Born: María Teresa Moure Pereiro; 1969 (age 56–57); Monforte de Lemos, Lugo, Spain
- Occupations: Writer, linguist
- Writing career
- Language: Galician, Spanish
- Genre: Female

María Teresa Moure Pereiro (Born in 1969, Monforte de Lemos, Spain) is a Galician writer. She lectures in Linguistics at the University of Santiago de Compostela. She has published essays, novels, children's books and a play. She was awarded the Lueiro Rey Prize and the Arzobispo San Clemente Prize for her first novel A xeira das árbores (Sotelo Blanco, 2004) and the Ramón Piñeiro Essay Prize for Outro idioma é posible (Galaxia, 2005). Her highly acclaimed novel Herba moura won the Xerais Prize for novels, the AELG Prize, the Irmandade do Libro á Autora Prize, the Benito Soto Prize for the best novel of 2005 and the Premio de la Crítica Española. She also received the Rafael Dieste Theatre Prize in 2007 for her play Unha primavera para Aldara. Her work has been translated into several languages. She provides her students of Linguistics with a new perspective on a discipline which continues to have roots in the European and Latin tradition.

== Works ==
- La alternativa no discreta en lingüística : una perspectiva histórica y metodológica (1997).
- Universales del lenguaje y linguo-diversidad (2001).
- La lingüística en el conjunto del conocimiento: una mirada crítica (2002).
- A xeira das árbores (2004) Sotelo Blanco Edicións. Novel. Spanish version La jornada de las mujeres-árbol (2006)
- Outro idioma é posible : na procura dunha lingua para a humanidade (2005) Editorial Galaxia. Essay. Ramón Piñeiro Essay Prize.
- As palabras das fillas de Eva (2005) Editorial Galaxia. Essay. Finalist for the Ramón Piñeiro essay prize. Spanish version La palabra de las hijas de Eva (2007)
- Herba moura (2005) Edicións Xerais. Novel. Translated to Spanish, Catalan, Italian, Portuguese, Dutch. and French
- Benquerida catástrofe (2007) Edicións Xerais. Novel. Spanish version Querida catastrofe (2011)
- Unha primavera para Aldara (2007) Edicións Xerais. Play. Rafael Dieste Theatre Prize
- A casa dos Lucarios (2007) Edicións Xerais. Novel.
- O natural e político (2008) Edicións Xerais. Essay.
- A intervención (2010) Edicións Xerais. Novel.
- Queer-emos un mundo novo. Sobre cápsulas, xéneros e falsas clasificacións (2012) Edicións Xerais. Essay. Ramón Piñeiro Essay Prize 2011
- Uma mãe tão punk (2014) Chiado Editora, Lisboa. Novel.
- Ostrácia (2015) Através Editora. Novel.
- Um elefante no armário (2017) Através Editora. Novel.
