= As Nogais =

Coordinates: 42°49′0″N 7°5′0″W

- Municipality
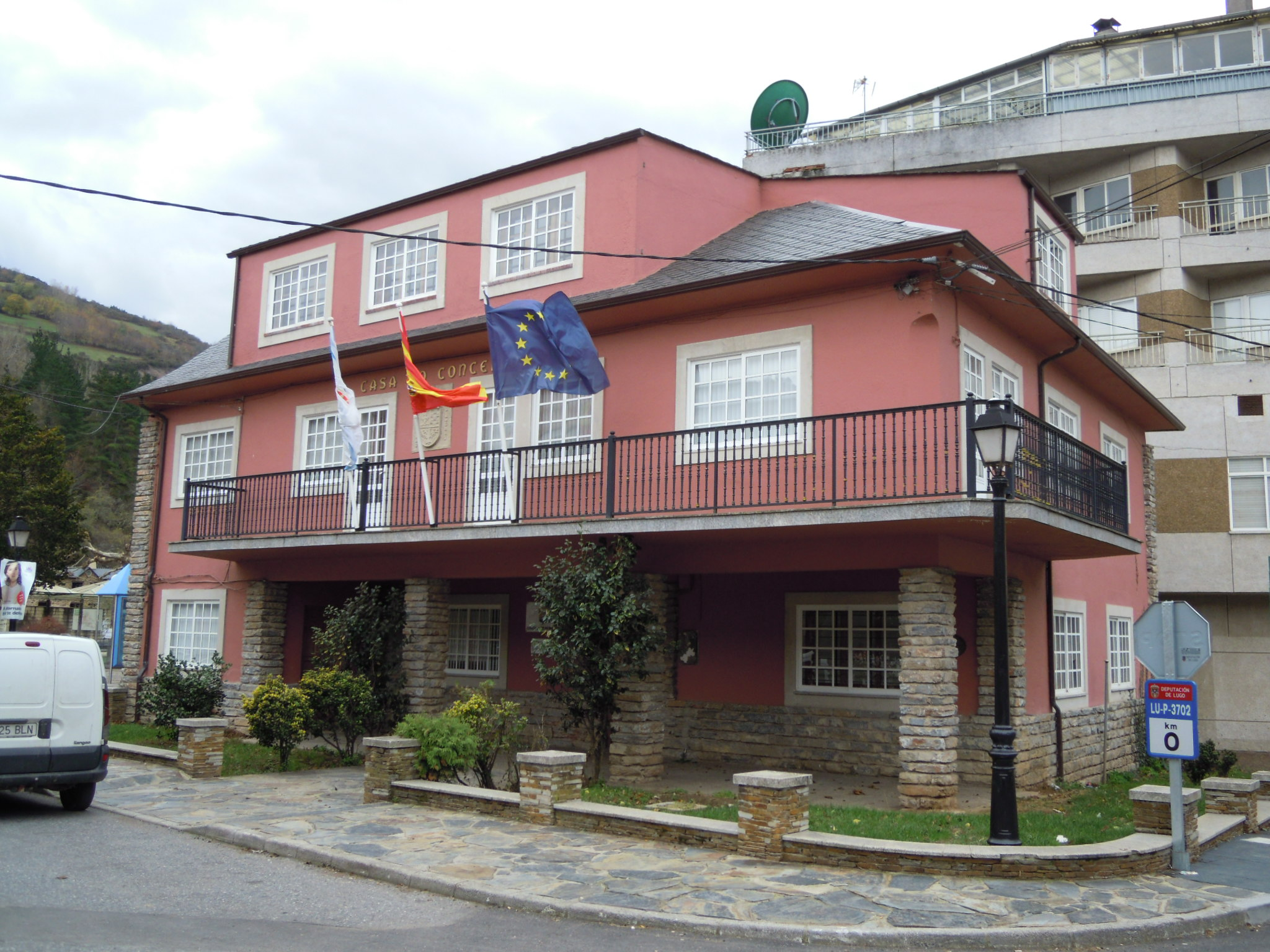
- Town hall.

- Coat of arms

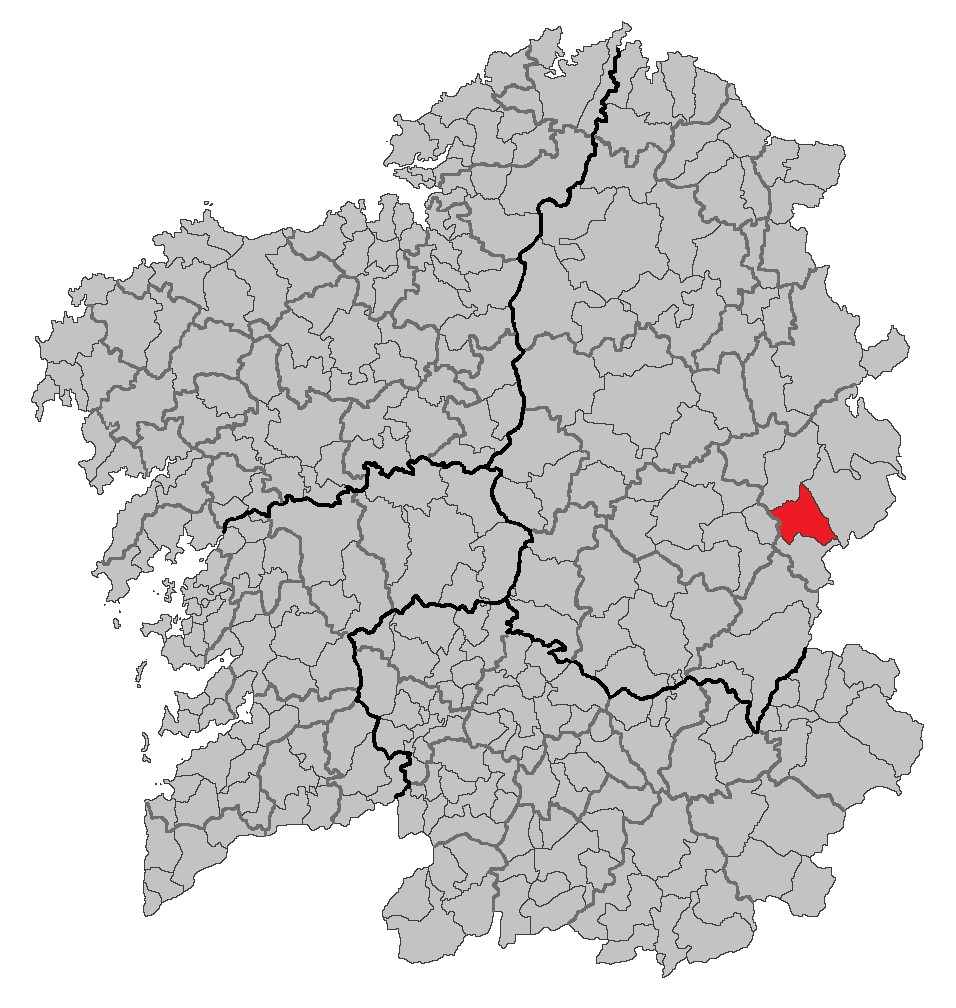
- Location of As Nogais

- Location in Spain
- Country: Spain
- Autonomous community: Galicia
- Province: Lugo
- Comarca: Os Ancares

Government
  - Alcalde: Jesús Núñez Díaz (PPdeG)
- Demonym: Nogalego
- Time zone: UTC+1 (CET)
  - Summer (DST): UTC+2 (CEST)
- Postal code: 27...
- Website: Official website

As Nogais is a municipality in the province of Lugo, in the autonomous community of Galicia, Spain. It belongs to the comarca of Os Ancares. It is 57 kilometers from the city of Lugo. It had a population of 1,381 in 2009 according to the Municipal Register of Inhabitants.

== Geography ==
The town stretches along the southern foothills of the Sierra de los Ancares and the valley formed by the upper reaches of the river Navía. It is a vast territory at 112.4 km^{2}. As Nogais has a very low population density with less than 15 inhabitants per square kilometer. The maximum height is in the Sierra de los Ancares in small hills like Travesa, Chan Pintinidoira and Pereira (between 1,000 and 2,000 m) and in the foothills of the Serras del Piornal and Rañadoiro. To the south and southwest the municipality exceeds 1,300 meters, reaching 1,387 meters at Pico do Corvo.

The Navia river, which begins in the Piedrafita del Cebrero, crosses As Nogais from southwest to northwest and collects water from, among others, the Valdeparada river and the stream of Boullón.

Winters are cold and summers are cool, with an average temperature of 9 °C and a temperature variation of 13 °C.

== History ==
There were settlements of Castro culture, such as the fort of Vilabol, Vilaesteva and Quintá. Located here is the Roman bridge of Ponte Naviae along the road from Braga to Astorga. On the road leading to Castile, the hardest part of the climb to Piedrafita began here. This entry to Galicia was defended by the Doncos tower and castles of Doiras and Valcarce. In the fourteenth century, Doncos was property of higher elder in Galicia named Garcia Rodríguez de Valcarce. In the fifteenth century Doncos belonged to the Earl of Ayala and Countess of Monterrey. But in 1603, when it was owned by Fernando de Toledo, it was already an abandoned tower.

The ecclesiastical advantage belonged to the house and lordship of Tores, possession of the Marquis of Camarasa. It seems that in the place of Santo André was a hermitage, converted to a monastery and quickly disappeared.

During the War of Independence of Spain, French troops burned Doncos and other sites as well. In 1835, neighbors formed a party of volunteers that prosecuted the Carlists.
