= Quiroga (comarca) =

Coordinates: 42°30′N 7°16′W

- Comarca
- Flag Coat of arms
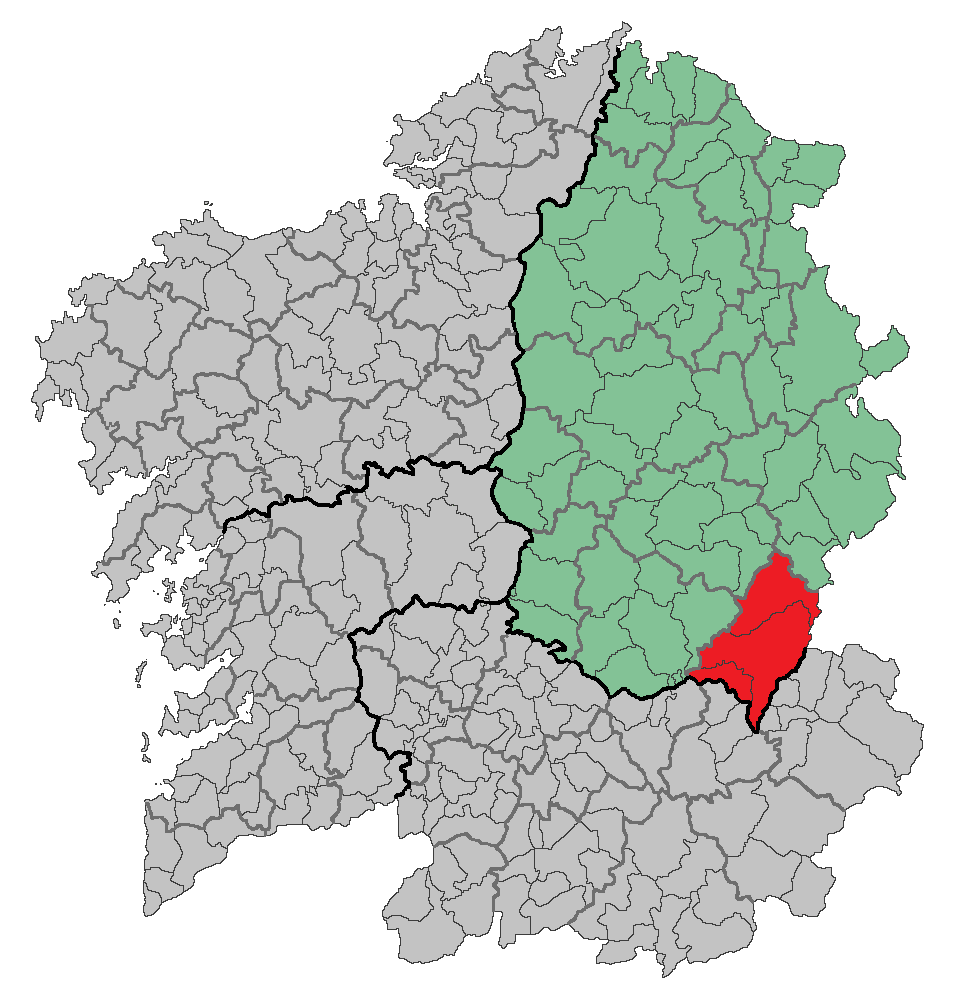
- Country: Spain
- Autonomous community: Galicia
- Province: Lugo
- Capital: Quiroga
- Municipalities: List: Folgoso do Courel, Quiroga, Ribas de Sil

Area
  - Total: 581 km^{2} (224 sq mi)

Population
  - Total: 6,800
  - Density: 12/km^{2} (30/sq mi)
- Demonym: quirogués
- Time zone: UTC+1 (CET)
  - Summer (DST): UTC+2 (CEST)

Quiroga is a comarca in the Galician Province of Lugo, Spain. The overall population of this local region is 6,800 (2005).

== Municipalities ==
Folgoso do Courel, Quiroga and Ribas de Sil.
