= Folgoso do Courel =

Coordinates: 42°35′20″N 7°11′43″W

- Municipality
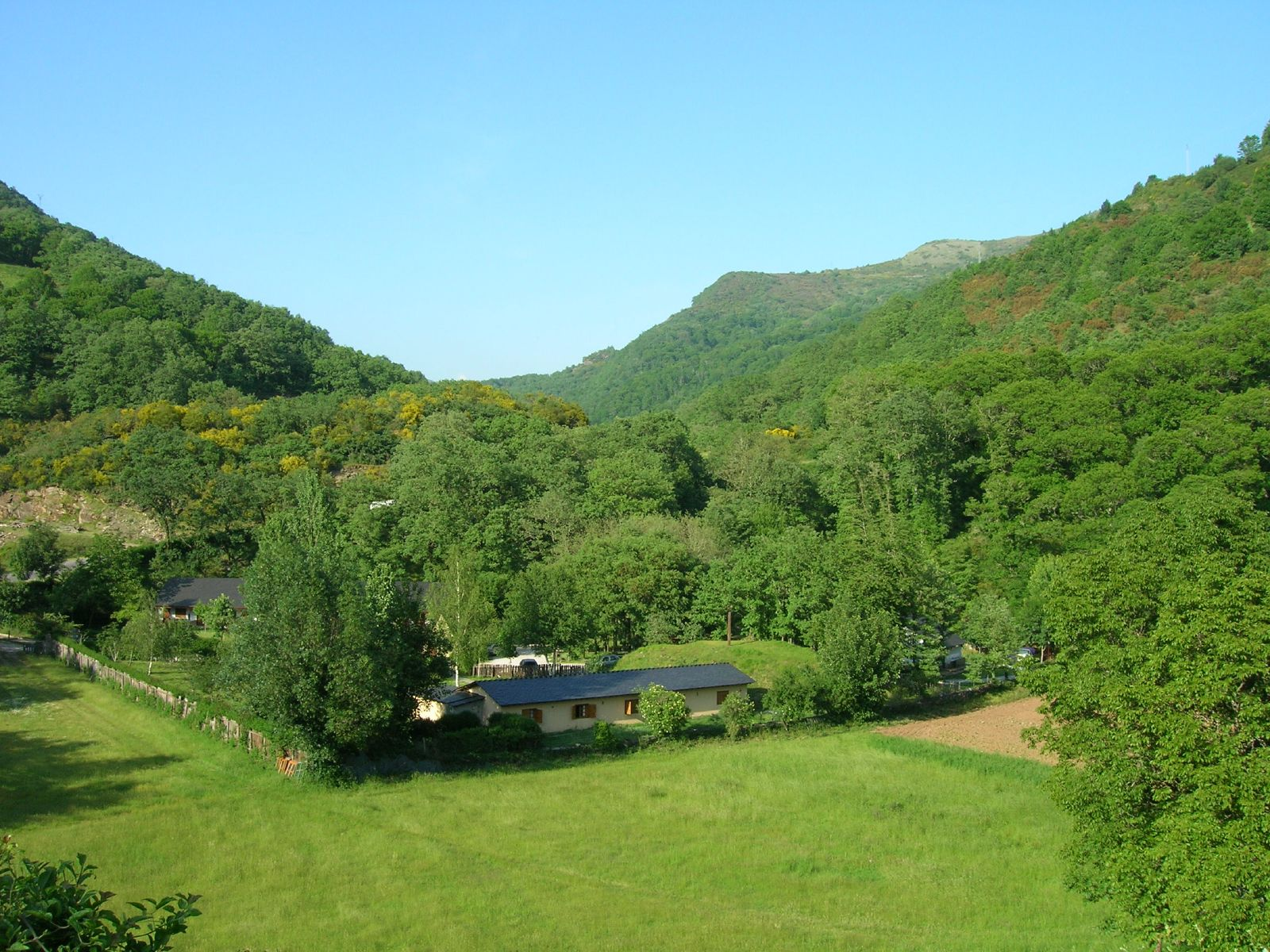
- Camping site in Esperante, Folgoso do Courel.

- Flag Coat of arms

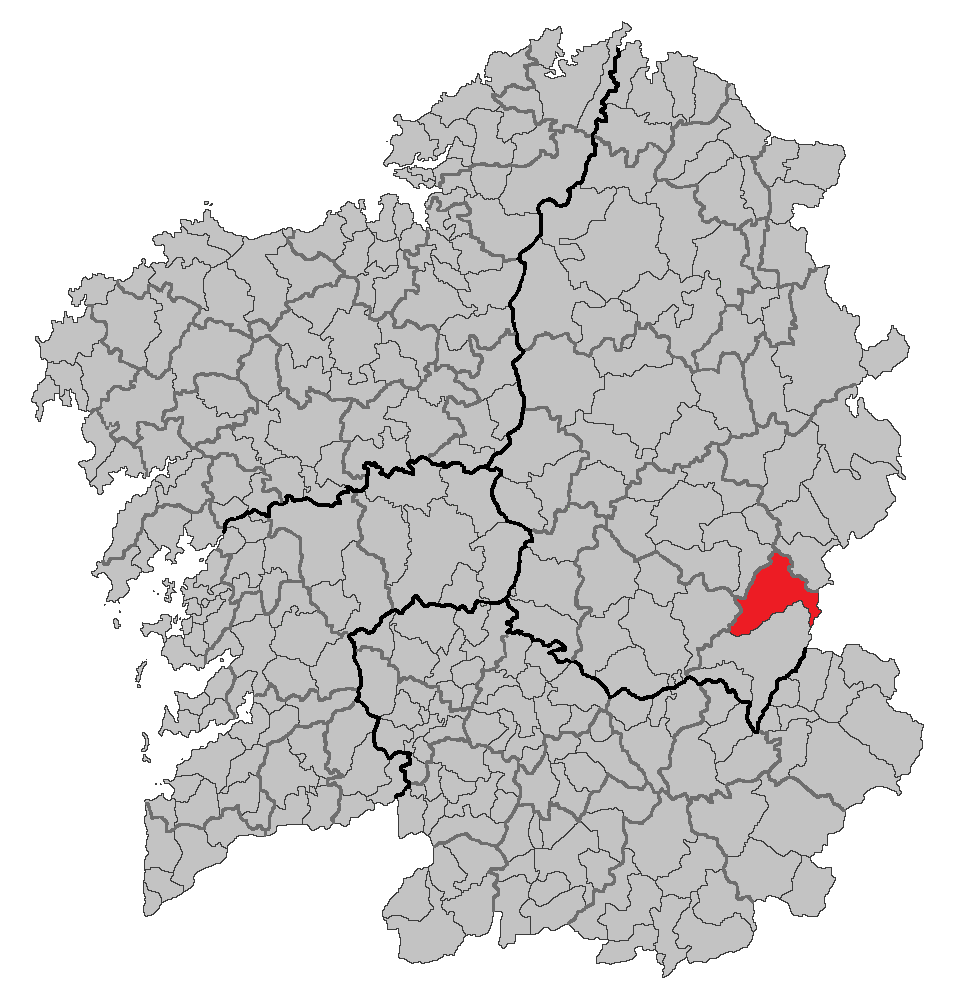
- Location of A Folgoso do Courel

- Location in Spain
- Country: Spain
- Autonomous community: Galicia
- Province: Lugo
- Comarca: Quiroga

Government
  - Alcalde: Dolores Castro Ochoaega (PPdeG)

Population (2025-01-01)
  - Total: 921
- Demonym(s): courelao, -a
- Time zone: UTC+1 (CET)
  - Summer (DST): UTC+2 (CEST)
- Postal code: 27017
- Website: Official website

Folgoso do Courel is a town and municipality in the province of Lugo, in the autonomous community of Galicia, Spain. It belongs to the comarca of Quiroga.

It is one of the main villages in O Courel, a geohistorical land in the province of Lugo.
