= Los Ancares =

Los Ancares is a district in northern Spain, which is noted for its unspoilt landscapes and ecological importance. The area takes its identity from the Sierra de los Ancares mountains which form a political and linguistic boundary between the autonomous communities of Galicia and Castile and León. The Spanish term Los Ancares Leoneses is sometimes used to refer to the zone on the Castile and León side of the sierra, which is in the basin of the river Sil. Os Ancares Lucenses is the corresponding term for the Galician side of the sierra: in Spanish, the name is Los Ancares.

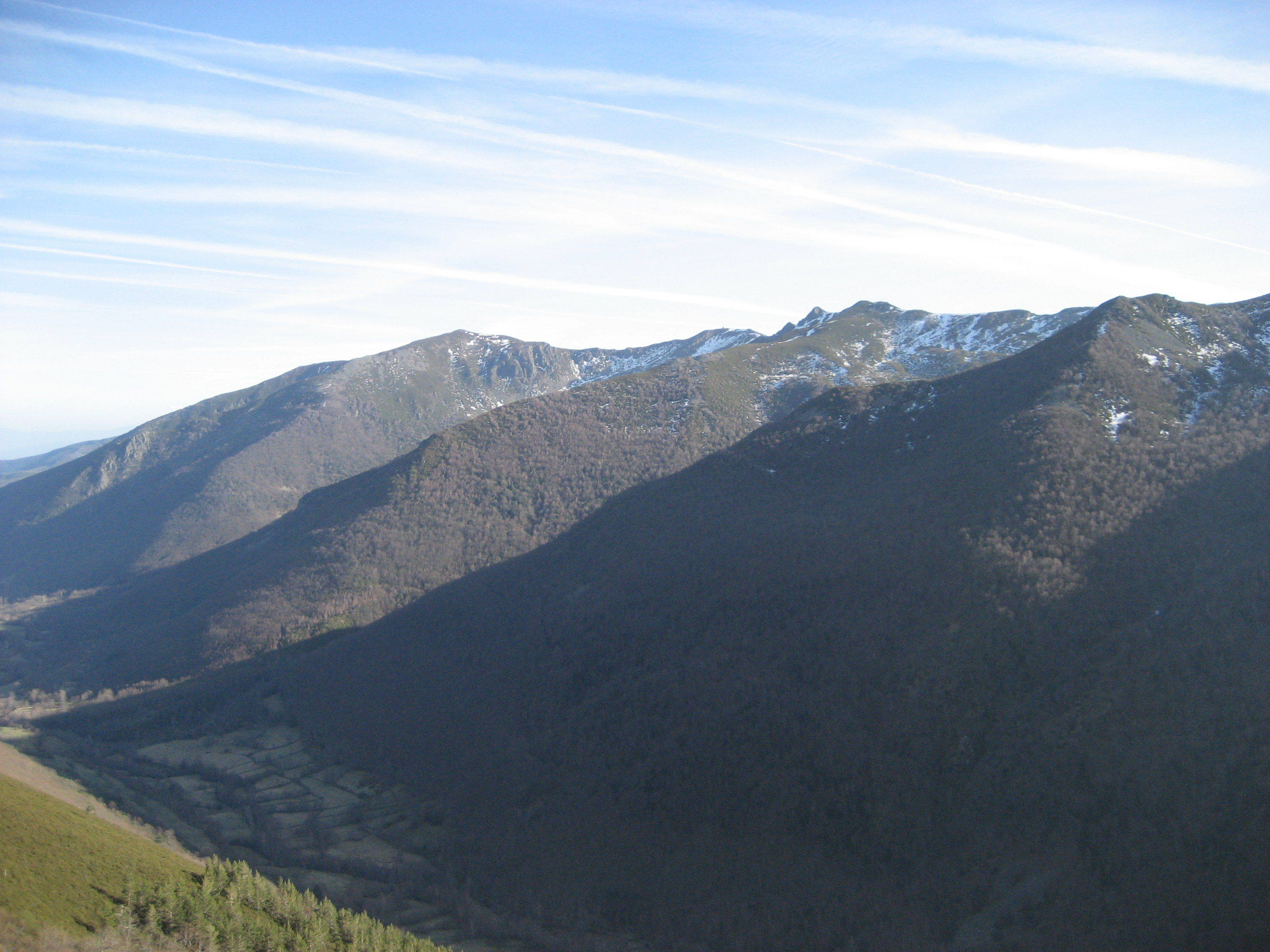
Landscape near Puerto de Ancares

== World Heritage Site ==
The area is a projected World Heritage Site, which would also include Somiedo Natural Park in Asturias.

== Wildlife ==
Fauna includes the Cantabrian brown bear.
