= Samos, Lugo =

Samos
- Municipality
- Flag Seal

- Location within Spain Location within Galicia
- Coordinates: 42°43′50.9″N 7°19′44.6″W
- Country: Spain
- A. community: Galicia
- Province: Lugo

Government
  - Mayor: María Jesús López

Area
  - Total: 136.8 km^{2} (52.8 sq mi)

Population (January 1, 2021)
  - Total: 1,228
  - Density: 8.977/km^{2} (23.25/sq mi)
- Time zone: UTC+01:00
- Postal code: 27620
- MCN: 27055
- Website: Official website

Samos is a municipality in the province of Lugo in the autonomous community of Galicia, Spain. It belongs to the comarca of Sarria.

== Geography ==
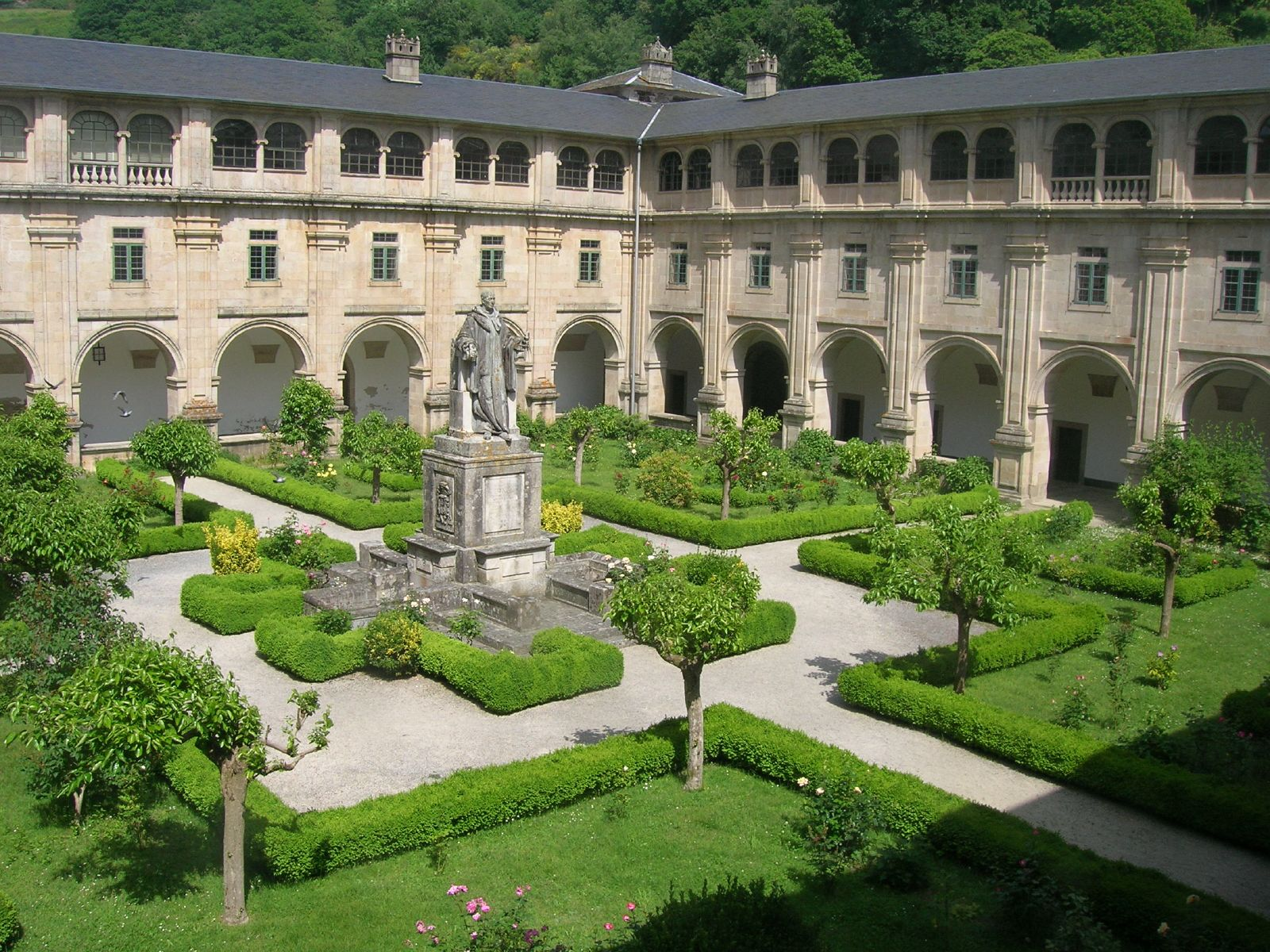
Royal Benedictine Abbey of St. Julian of Samos

Samos is near the eastern mountains of Galicia (the mountains of Lóuzara, Serra do Oribio and Mountains of Albola). The mean altitude is over 700 m and the highest elevation is the mountain of O Oribio at 1,443 m. The Sarria River, a tributary of the Miño River, collects water from the western slopes of the mountains; the Lóuzara River drains the eastern slopes, flowing to the Lor River and then to the Sil River. There are three well-differentiated areas: the central one, where the population is mainly located; the north area, more open and with smooth slopes, and Lóuzara, the southern area, with mountains and valleys.

The thermic oscillation is high (13 °C), with cold winters, when the fields are frequently frozen. Annual rainfall ranges from 900 to 1,500 mm per year.

The municipality extends over 136 km².

== Nature ==
Samos is located in a natural setting in a valley that leads into the mountains of Pedrafita. It crosses the Oribio river, a small river rich in eel and trout and one of the most representative dishes of the area.

== Culture ==
The village of Samos is located approximately 11 kilometers from Sarria and 45 kilometers from Lugo. It is home to an abbey, the Real Abadía de Samos, and the Benedictine monastery of San Xulián de Samos. Pilgrims on the Way of St. James to Compostela often pass through Samos to visit the abbey and monastery. There is a refuge (accommodation) that the pilgrims can use freely at the Royal Benedictine Abbey of St. Julian of Samos. The abbey, one of the most important religious centers of Galicia, is dated the sixth century, a period in which the Swabian territories inhabited what is now known as Galicia.

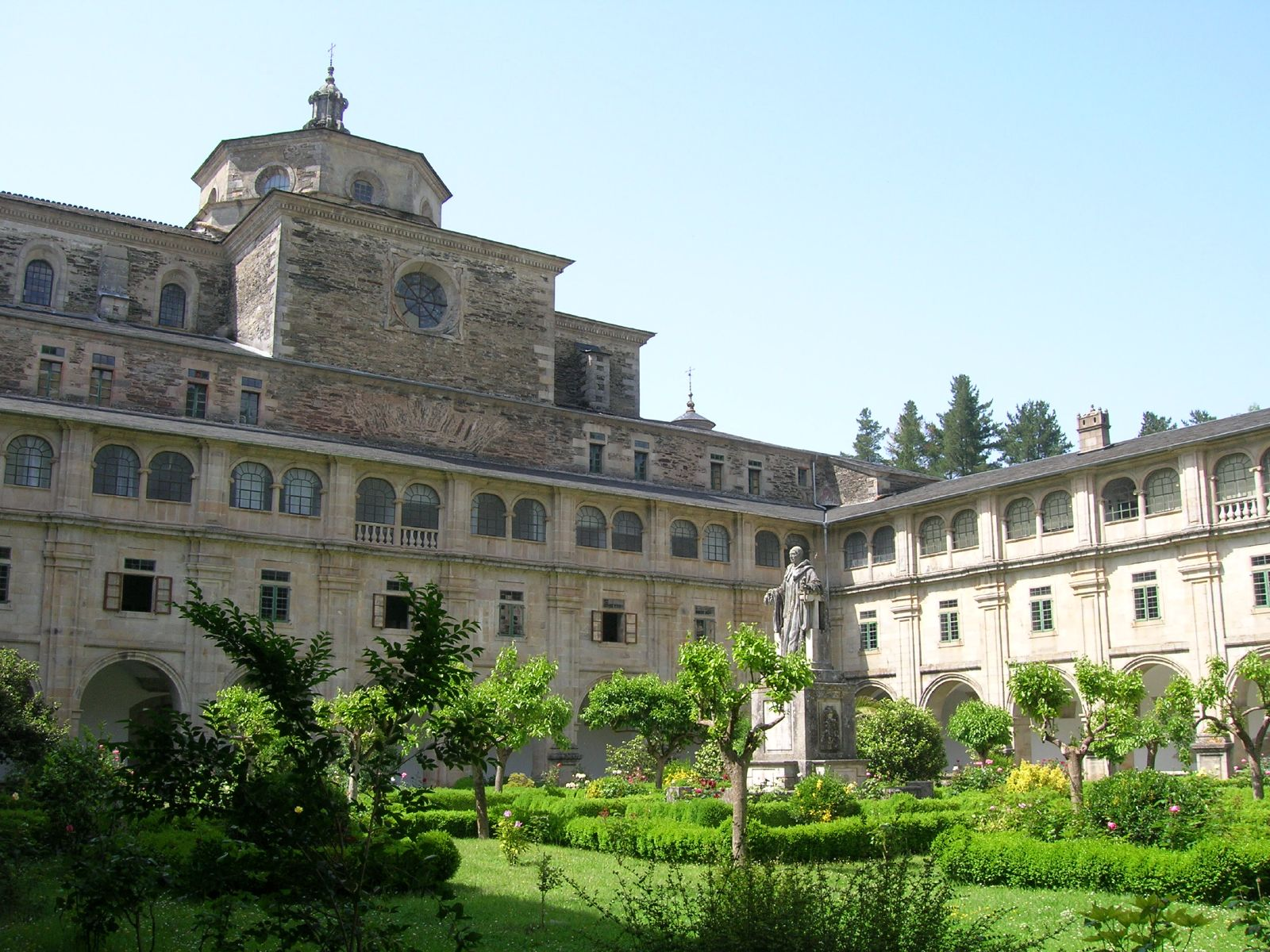
The Monastery of San Xulián de Samos

Samos is bordered in the north by the municipality of Láncara; in the south by Folgoso do Courel and A Pobra do Brollón; in the east by Triacastela, Pedrafita do Cebreiro and Folgoso do Courel; and in the west by Sarria and O Incio. Samos belongs to the judicial party of Sarria and to the diocese (province of the Church) of Lugo.

== Economy ==
Economically, Samos is sustained by agriculture and livestock, but hospitality is in a time of enormous growth. Popular tourist destinations include (but are not limited to): the monastery of San Xian de Samos, the Lóuzara valley, and the Sierra do Oribio mountains. Its landscapes and quality of its typical products of the region are a major lure for rural tourism and gastronomy.

== Civil parishes ==
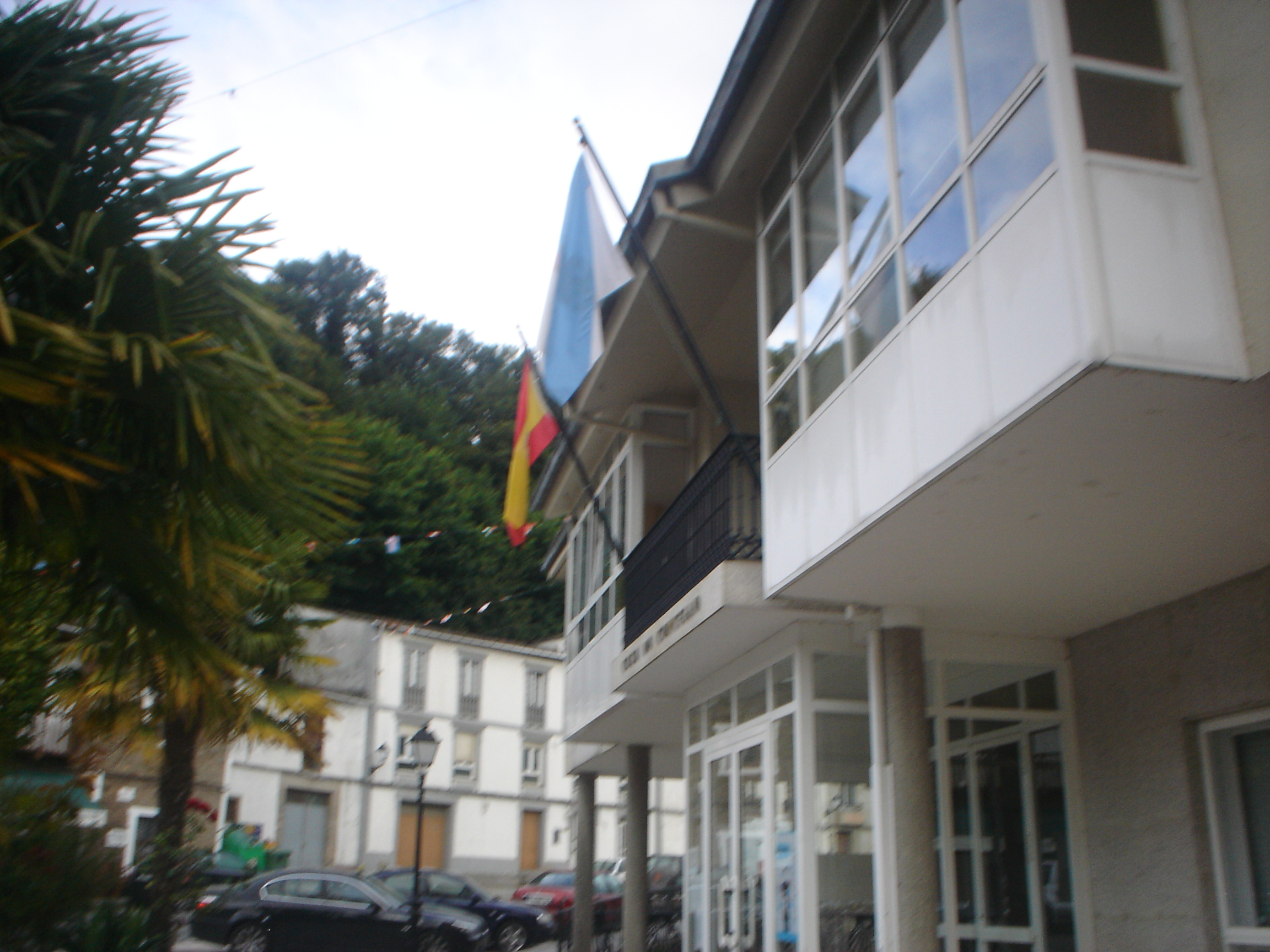
City council of Samos

- Castroncán (Santa Marta)
- Estraxiz (Santiago)
- Formigueiros (Santiago)
- Freixo (San Silvestre)
- Frollais (San Miguel)
- Gundriz (Santo André)
- Loureiro (Santa María)
- Lousada (San Martiño)
- Montán (Santa María)
- Pascais (Santalla)
- Reiriz (Santo Estevo)
- Renche (Santiago)
- Romelle (San Martiño)
- Samos (Santa Xertrude)
- San Cristovo de Lóuzara (San Cristovo)
- San Cristovo do Real (San Cristovo)
- San Mamede do Couto (San Mamede)
- San Martiño do Real (San Martiño)
- San Xil de Carballo (San Xil)
- San Xoán de Lóuzara (San Xoán)
- Santalla (San Xosé)
- Suñide (Santa María)
- Teibilide (San Xulián)
- Zoó (Santiago)

== Specimen trees ==
The ancient cypress found in the chapel next to the cemetery and the river was highlighted as it was planted while the chapel was built as a sign of spirituality.

== Festivals ==
- San Bieito, June 11
- Santa Basilisa, patroness of the monastery, January 9
- Pilgrimage of San Roque in Santalla de Lóuzara, August 16

== Notable people ==
- Diogo Alves - serial killer active in Portugal
