= Manuel Rodríguez López =

Spanish poet & writer (1934–1990)

Manuel Oreste Rodríguez López
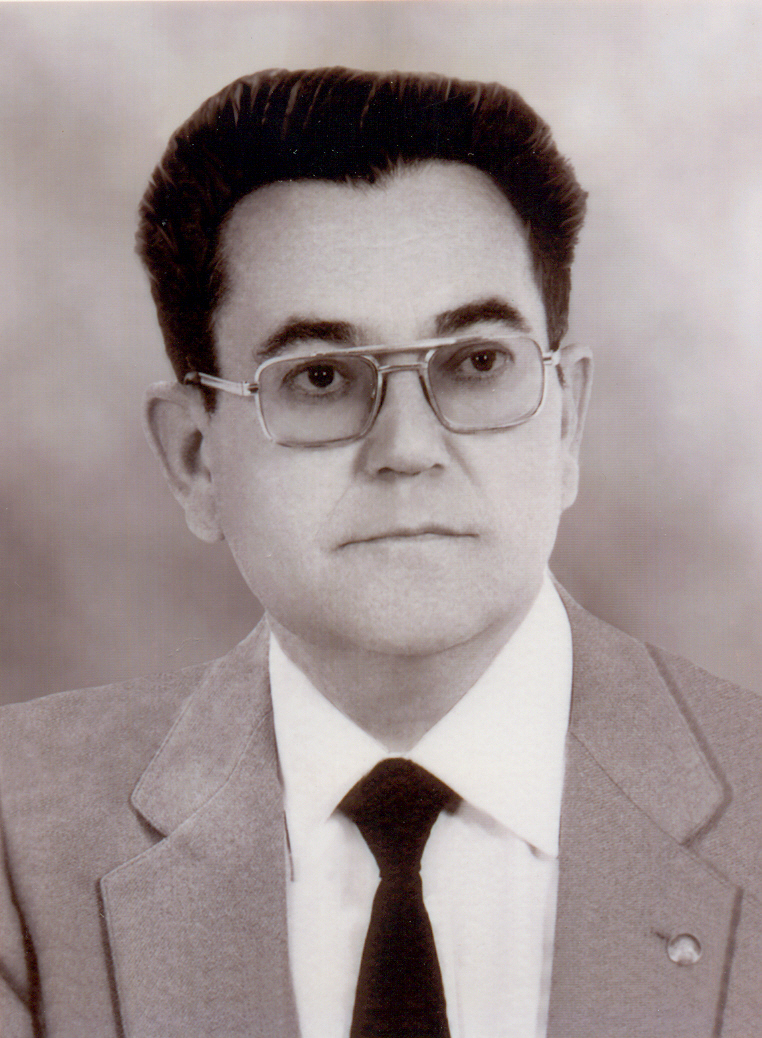
- Born: 11 December 1934; Paradela, Lugo
- Died: 13 February 1990 (aged 55); Lugo
- Resting place: Paradela
- Education: Minor Seminary of Tiana and Major Seminary of Barcelona
- Known for: Poetry and Prose
- Notable work: "Galegos en Catalunya" I (1983) and II (1985), "Soldada Minima" (1979), "Viaxes con Anxel Fole" (1988)
- Spouse: Irene Lopez Gomez (O Paramo)
- Children: Enrique (1963), Santiago (1971)
- Awards: Various Literary awards (see article)

Signature
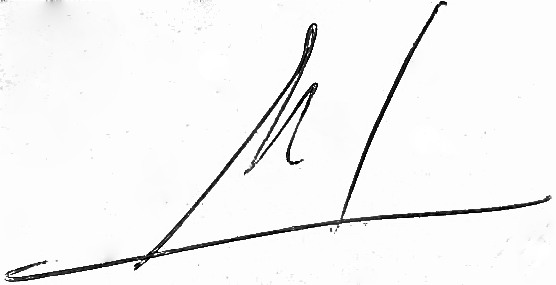

Manuel Oreste Rodríguez López (11 December 1934 – 13 February 1990) was a poet and writer from the Galicia region of Spain.

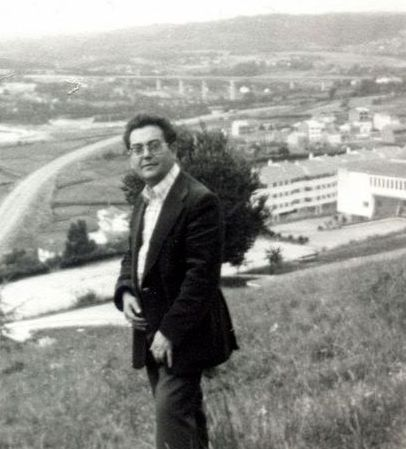
Manuel Rodríguez López in the Rosalia de Castro park in Lugo

== Biography ==
Manuel Rodríguez López was born in 1934 in a hamlet near Paradela in the province of Lugo. When he was six years old, he moved to Barcelona, and in 1987, he returned to Lugo. He studied Philosophy and Humanities at the Diocesan Seminary of Barcelona from 1946 to 1952. He then studied accounting and labour legislation. He worked as the head of the department of administrative staff in a motorcycle industry (OSSA). He married Irene Lopez Gomez (O Páramo), and fathered two sons. He died from a stroke in Lugo in 1990.

Throughout his life he showed great concern for culture and Galicia during his long emigration in Catalonia, where he became the chronicler of all acts related to Galicia celebrated in Catalonia, as once established in Lugo.

Manuel Rodriguez Lopez was awarded in numerous literary contests. Highlights include the first awards for poetry 'Meigas e Trasgos' of Sarria in the years 1976 and 1980, the 'Prize José M ª Chao Ledo' in the III the Literary Contest of Vilalba, in 1977, and the first prize in the Literary Contest of Begonte in 1985. In prose, he won the first prize for 'Nos' (Barcelona) in 1980. In Sarria, two of his stories won the prize 'Meigas e Trasgos' in 1977 and 1986. In Barakaldo he won a prize in 1978. In 1985 and 1987 he was a finalist in the Features section in the Journalism Awards of Galicia.

Several songs were composed based on several of his poems by Suso Vaamonde, Xerardo Moscoso, Alfredo González Vilela and Mary C. Otero Rolle.

In the year of his death (1990), he was posthumously named "Fillo Predilecto de Paradela" and "Lucense do ano 1989".

== Legacy ==
Manuel Rodriguez Lopez left a resounding legacy in the culture of Galicia, and in the émigré culture of Galician Emigrants throughout the world in his journalistic work, but mainly in his books "Galegos en Catalunya" I and II. Another legacy that he has left is that of the Literary contest in his name, which helps to promote aspiring authors and poets writing in Galician or Castilian. Manuel Rodriguez Lopez was a regular contributor to media in Galicia, Catalonia and Argentina. He was correspondent of Faro de Vigo and El Ideal Gallego in Barcelona, where he signed with his full name (Manuel Oreste). He collaborated regularly in El Progreso (Lugo), La Voz de Galicia and the local newspaper from Lugo Praza Maior (published by Lugo City Council). He was Official Chronicler of the Galician Centre of Barcelona, publishing numerous articles in the magazines Boletin, Treboada and Alborada from that entity. He collaborated with the newspaper Correo de Galicia and other newspapers and magazines in Buenos Aires and published several articles in the Galician magazines Coordenadas and Dorna. He also worked on Radio Nacional de España in A Coruña, and on Radio Popular de Lugo, focusing his contributions on issues of Lugo's history, monuments and travel.

=== Manuel Rodriguez Lopez Socio-Cultural Centre ===
In 1990, the first Centro Socio-cultural centre was unveiled in Paradela, then to be relocated to what is now the centre in 2001.

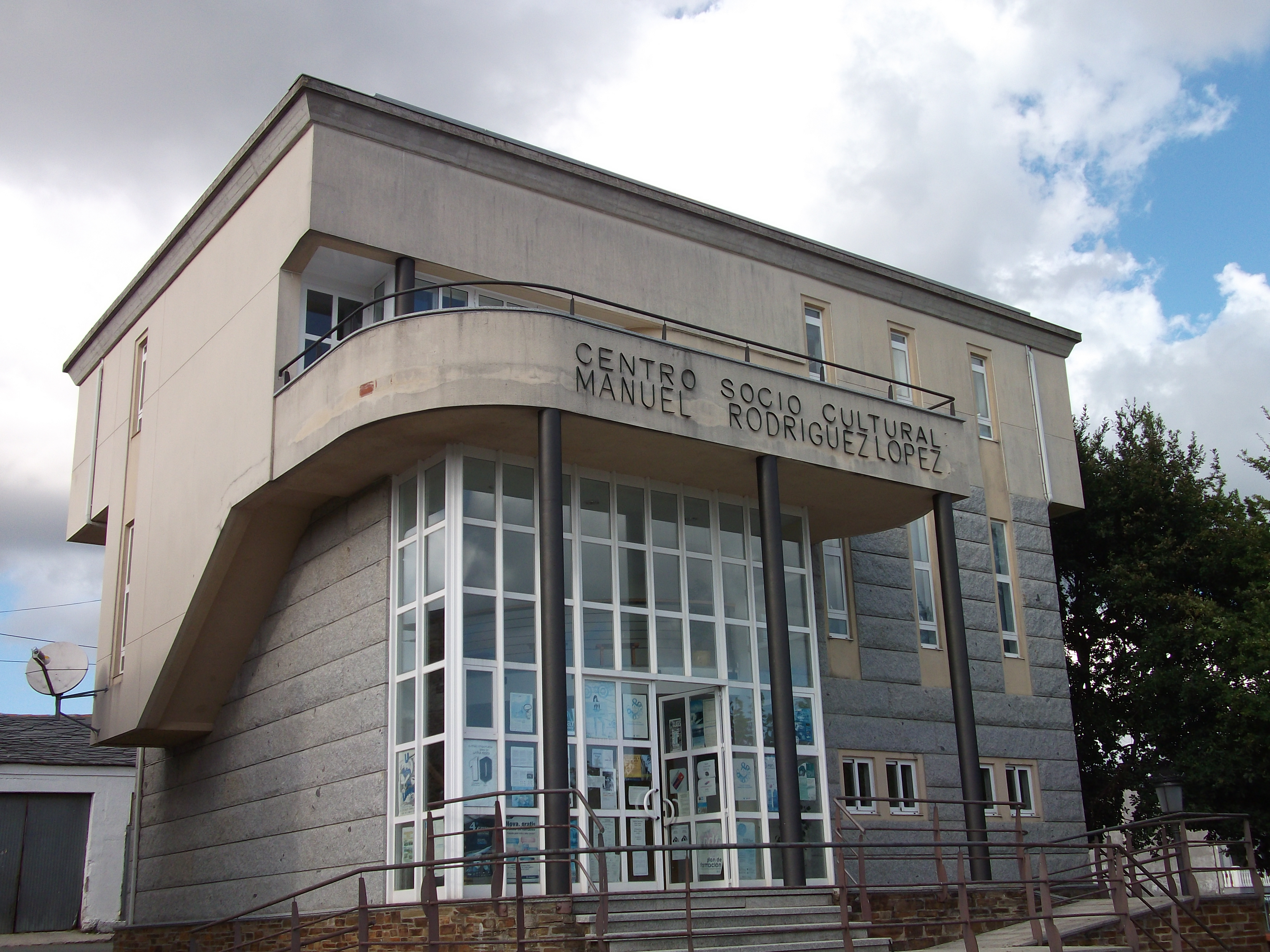
Socio-Cultural Centre named after Manuel Oreste Rodríguez López in Paradela

The Socio-Cultural Centre currently houses a library, computer facilities and a usable hall, which the community is free to use. The Literary contest named after him has been held there yearly since 1995. This contest is run by Paradela Town Council and reached the 17th Edition in 2012.

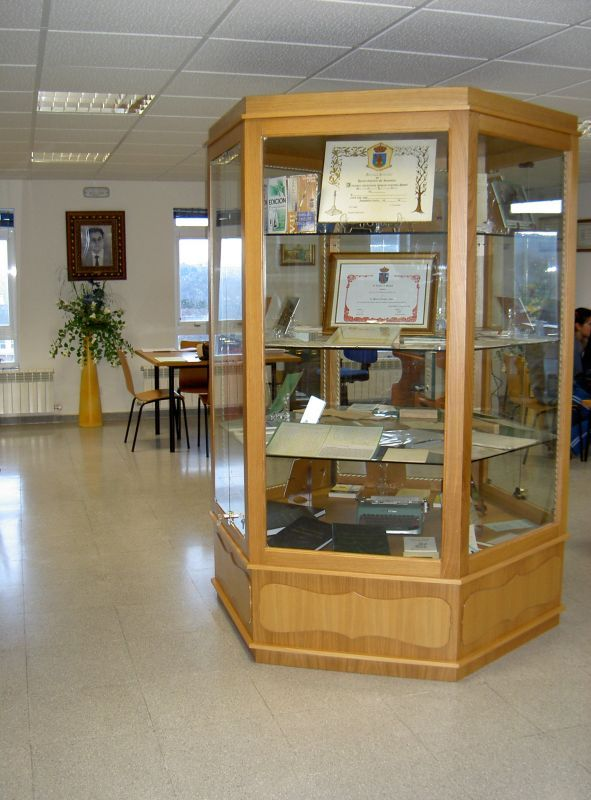
Library at the Socio-Cultural Centre dedicated to Manuel Rodriguez Lopez

== Publications ==
=== Poetry ===
- Poemas populares galegos (1968)
- Saudade no bulleiro (1970)
- Soldada mínima (1979)
- Onte e hoxe vivencial (1995)
- A Atlántida (1995), translation from Catalan to Galician of the book by Jacint Verdaguer.
- Manuel Rodríguez López. Poesía completa (2009)
- Manuel Rodríguez López. Antoloxía Poética (2014)

=== Prose ===
- Reencontro coa aldea (1983)
- Galegos en Catalunya 1978–1982 (1983)
- Galegos en Catalunya-2 (1985)
- Viaxes con Ánxel Fole (1988)
- Festa da Virxe das Dores de Paradela 1989 (1989)
- Volta a España a pé (1990), translation from Spanish to Galician of the book by Manolo Silva

=== Books published at the Biblioteca Virtual de GaliciaDixital ===
- Lugueses (2020)
- Semblanzas de galegos ilustres (2020)
- Vacacions en Galicia: Vivir Galicia (2020)
- Vivimos unha longa traxedia (peza teatral) (2020)

=== Collaborations in collective books ===
- Homaxe ó Che (1970)
- A Nosa Terra from "Libro de Oro", in the 100th anniversary of Ramón Cabanillas) (1976)
- Homenaxe multinacional a Castelao (1976)
- Galicia no ano 1979 (1979)
- José Mª Acuña (1983)
- Os escritores lucenses arredor de Fole (1986)
- Voces poéticas (1987)
- Paradela y su concello (1990)
- Aliad-Ultreia. Poesía. Pintura (1993)

== Sources ==
- Gran Enciclopedia Gallega
- Marcial González Vigo and Xulio Xiz (1983). Medio cento de galegos e Rosalía.
- Olegario Sotelo Blanco (1983). 88 gallegos: una tierra a través de sus gentes.
- Xosé Luís Méndez Ferrín (1983), De Pondal a Novoneyra Edicións Xerais de Galicia
- Francisco Fernández del Riego (1990). Diccionario de escritores en lingua galega.
- Xulio Xiz et al. (1993). Un paso de poesía. Poesía Galega 1961–1975 (book and vídeo VHS).
- Dolores Vilavedra (1995). Diccionario da literatura galega I. Galaxia. ISBN 84-8288-019-5.
- Xosé de Cora (1997). Diccionario de Fole.
- Xosé Lois García Fernández (1999). Alén do azul. Unha ducia de poetas galegos en Catalunya.
- Manuel Blanco Castro (2000). Vida e obra de Manuel Rodríguez López.
- Xulio Xiz (2007) O Corgo, amplo horizonte.
- Olegario Sotelo Blanco (2011) Migració gallega a Catalunya.
- GaliciaDixital (2014) Manuel Rodríguez López, emigrante galego, poeta obreiro
- Ángel Fernández López (2016) Paradela no tempo: vínculos con Portomarín.
- Santiago Rodríguez López (2018) En torno á parábola das cereixas de Xulio Xiz Biblioteca Virtual de GaliciaDixital
- Santiago Rodríguez López (2018) Poemas Populares Galegos. Edición especial 50 aniversario 1968–2018 Biblioteca Virtual de GaliciaDixital
- Several authors (2018) Manuel Rodríguez López 25 anos despois
- Santiago Rodríguez López (2019) A Paradela de Manuel Rodríguez López Biblioteca Virtual de GaliciaDixital
- Antonio Giz Paz and Santiago Rodríguez López (2020) Exposición itinerante Manuel Rodríguez López 2013–2020 Biblioteca Virtual de GaliciaDixital

== See also ==
- Manuel Rodriguez Lopez Socio-Cultural Centre
- Manuel Oreste Rodriguez Lopez Literary Contest
