= Sarria (disambiguation) =

Sarria is a municipality in the province of Lugo, Galicia, Spain.

Sarria or Sarrià may also refer to:

- Sarrià, Barcelona, a neighbourhood in Barcelona, Catalonia, Spain
  - Sarrià-Sant Gervasi, the Barcelona district containing Sarrià
  - Sarrià Stadium, a former football stadium in Sarrià, Barcelona
  - Sarrià (Barcelona Metro), a station of the Barcelona Metro
- Callosa d'en Sarrià, a municipality in the Valencian Community
- Sarrià de Ter, a municipality in Girona, Catalonia, Spain
- Sarria (comarca), a comarca in the province of Lugo, Galicia, Spain
