= Manuel Oreste Rodriguez Lopez Literary Contest =

- Genres: Poetry, Prose
- Prizes: 2 x €600, Accessits
- Years running: 18 years
- Award Ceremony date: December
- Current edition: 18

The Manuel Oreste Literary Contest is a literary contest hosted by Paradela City Council. The award ceremony is held in the Manuel Rodriguez Lopez Socio-Cultural Centre, Paradela on a yearly basis. The contest is open to writers and poets writing in either the Galician or Spanish languages, with prizes given out to the winners of each category. It is hosted in the name of the Galician poet, author and chronicler Manuel Rodriguez Lopez, and has been held every year without interruptions since 1995, with the award ceremony for the 18th Edition scheduled for December 2013.

== Criteria ==
Writers and Poets from anywhere in the world writing in Galician or Spanish are eligible to submit their work to the contest. The work must be maximum 20 pages long, and poetry must be maximum 100 verses long. The work must be original and unedited, and must not have won any other contest. The work must be typed, with double-spacing. The jury evaluates all the work sent the year of the Award Ceremony, and is composed of Galician and Spanish speakers. The members of the jury for the 18th Edition are listed below:

- José Manuel Mato Díaz (Mayor of Paradela and president of the jury);
- José. Jesús Ramos Ledo (Regional Minister of Government, Education, Culture and University)
- Santiago Rodríguez López (Son of Manuel Rodriguez Lopez)
- Xesús Mato Mato (Clergy and Musicologist)
- Xulio Xiz Ramil (Writer and Journalist)
- Xavier Rodríguez Barrio (poet)

== Awards ==
Two prizes of €600 are given, one for each category (Poetry or Prose). Accessits and Honourable mentions can also be given at the jury's discretion, but lack in economic value. There were 958 and 968 works submitted for the 17th and 18th Editions respectively. The prized members of all the editions are listed below:

	Poetry Prize	Poetry Accessit(s)	Honourable Mention(s)	Prose Prize	Prose Accessit(s)	Honourable Mention(s)
1st Edition (1996)	Agustín Hermida Castro			Beatriz Piñeiro Calvo	Sechu Sende	
2nd Edition (1997)	Modesto Fraga Moure	Roberto X. Traba Velay		Marco V. Lama del Corral	Rosa Aneiros Díaz; Pedro Rielo Lamela	
3rd Edition (1998)	Antonio Esteban González Alonso	José Ricardo Vélez Vázquez		Xabier Castro García		
4th Edition (1999)	Roberto X. Traba Velay			Beatriz Piñeiro Calvo		
5th Edition (2000)	Baldomero Iglesias Dobarrio	Unai González Suárez		Jaime Naveria Pedreira		
6th Edition (2001)	Manuel Terrín Benavides	Baldomero Iglesias Dobarrio		Francisco Calo Lourido	Pedro Uris Escolano	
7th Edition (2002)	Simón Iglesias Posse	Salvador Moreno Pérez; Estíbaliz Espinosa Río		Xosé Nicanor Alonso Alvarez	Xaime Naveira Pedreira	
8th Edition (2003)	Salvador Moreno Pérez; Alexandre Nerium (shared prize)	Francisco Piñeiro González		Xaime Domínguez Toxo	Xoán Xosé García López	
9th Edition (2004)	María Goretti Fariña Caamaño	Manuel Luque Tapia; María Rey Torrente		Francisco Piñeiro González	Vicente Javier García Gómez; Andrés Albuerne de Frutos	
10th Edition (2005)	María Teresa Núñez González	Amadeo Cobas; Unai González Suárez		Francisco Piñeiro González	Julio Romero Suárez María; Teresa López de la Fuente; Domingo A. Martínez Martín	
11th Edition (2006)	Restituto Núñez Cobos	Juan Lorenzo Collado Gómez; Alba Cid Fernández; Isabel Oliver González		Francisco Rozados Rivas	Juan Lorenzo Collado Gómez; Francisco Piñeiro González	
12th Edition (2007)	Carmen Caramés Gorgal	Alfredo Macías Macías; Manuel Luque Tapia		Rafael Laso Lorenzo	Francisco Piñeiro González; Iván García Campos	
13th Edition (2008)	Feliciano Ramos Navarro	José M. López Calo; Cristalina López Rodríguez		Moisés Alvarez Jorge	Carmen Cuevas Crespo; Julio Romero Suárez	
14th Edition (2009)	Alba Cid Fernández	Sara Castelar Lorca; Mª Isabel Gómez Arto		Alberto Rodríguez Díaz	Juan José Ruíz Moñino; Isabel Julián Quiroga	
15th Edition (2010)	Emma Pedreira	Manuel García Díaz Pintado; Rosa Piñeiro Fariña		Pepe Pol	Noa María Carballa Rivas; Mercedes Blanco Iglesias	
16th Edition (2011)	Beatriz Lorenzo	José María Calo; Pablo Núñez González; Marcial González Vigo		Xosé Manuel Dopazo Mella	Noa María Carballa Rivas; Mercedes Blanco Iglesias	
17th Edition (2012)	José Antonio Repeto González	Xosé Otero Canto; Marcial González Vigo	Margarita Souvirón López; Yoli López	Erick Hernández Mora	Pepe Pol; Xaime Domínguez Toxo	Sofía Rodríguez Suárez; Marcos Dios Almeida
18th Edition (2013)	Ramón Sandoval Pérez	Luis García Pérez; Jacobo Llamas Martínez	Xosé Otero Canto; Mercedes Saénz Blasco; José Gabriel Rodríguez Ambrosio	Manrique Fernández Vázquez	Xosé Farruco Graña Rama; José Luis Hernández Garvi	José Ángel Corral Suárez; Antonio Garrigo Jiménez

== See also ==
- Manuel Rodriguez Lopez
- Manuel Rodriguez Lopez Socio-Cultural Centre
- Paradela
- Poetry
- Prose
- Galician
- Spanish
