= Manuel Rodriguez Lopez Socio-Cultural Centre =

Coordinates: 42.76569°N 7.56722°W

- Centro Socio-Cultural Manuel Oreste Rodríguez López
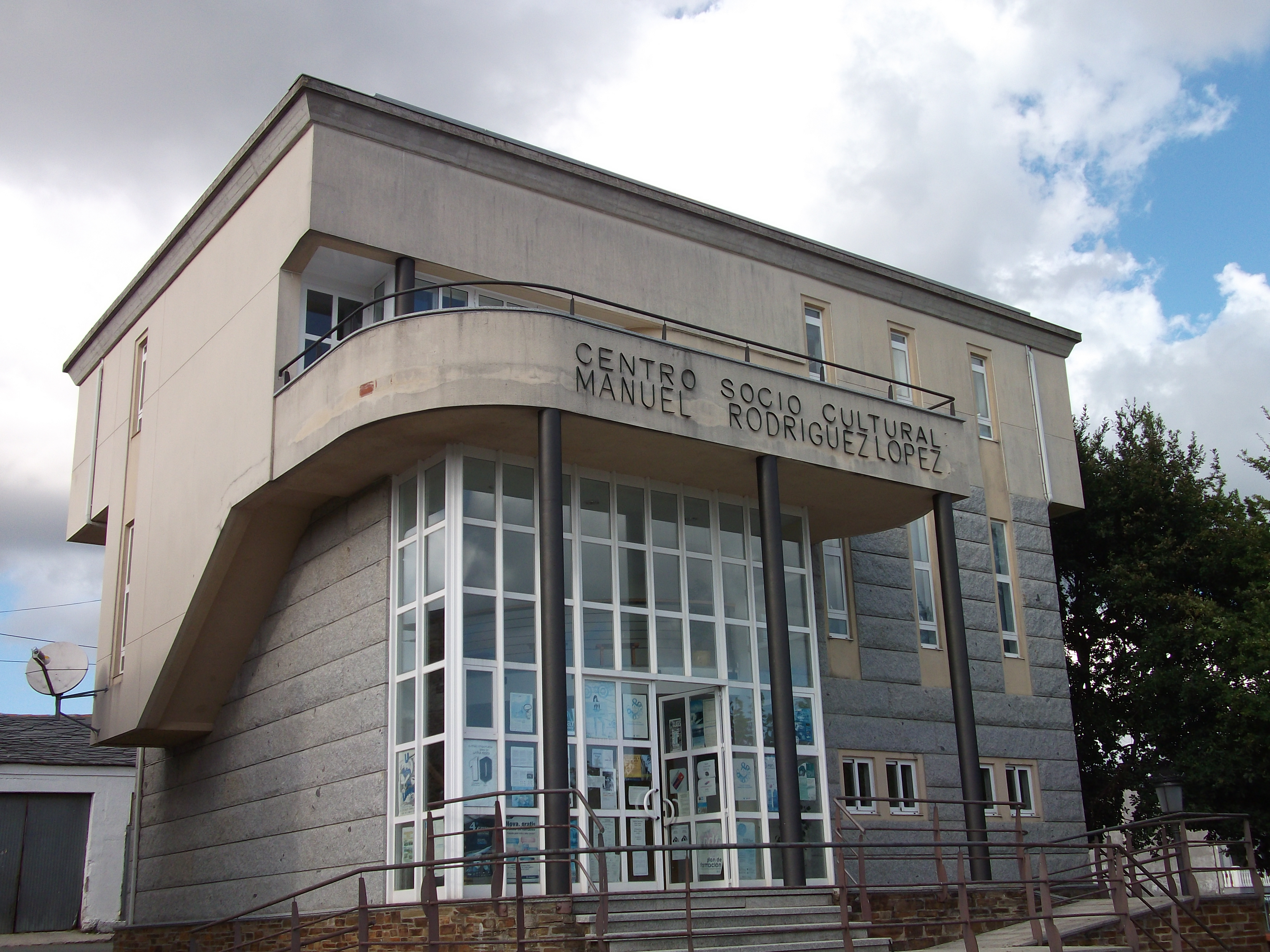
- Manuel Rodriguez Lopez Socio-Cultural Centre
- Former names: Casa de Cultura de Paradela

General information
- Location: Paradela
- Address: no. 5 Fraga Iribarne Street
- Completed: 2001
- Inaugurated: 30/9/2001

The Manuel Rodriguez Lopez Socio-Cultural Centre is a centre with library facilities, computer and a large social space dedicated to the poet, writer and chronicler Manuel Rodriguez Lopez, situated in Paradela. The facilities are open to use for the community, and it is the place in which the Manuel Oreste Rodriguez Lopez Literary Contest is held yearly.

== History ==
The centre was unveiled in 2001 by Manuel Fraga Iribarne. This new building is the home to what was the Manuel Rodriguez Lopez house of Culture, inaugurated in 1990. The Manuel Oreste Rodriguez Lopez Literary Contest has been held there yearly since 1995, reaching the 17th edition in 2012. The prize-giving ceremony is celebrated every December.

== Facilities ==
The centre has a library located on the last floor, which is used as Paradela's library. There is also a hall in which important social events in Paradela are hosted. Also, there is a room with computers which can be used by the public, and can be used as a social space, with newspapers, cards, board games etc...

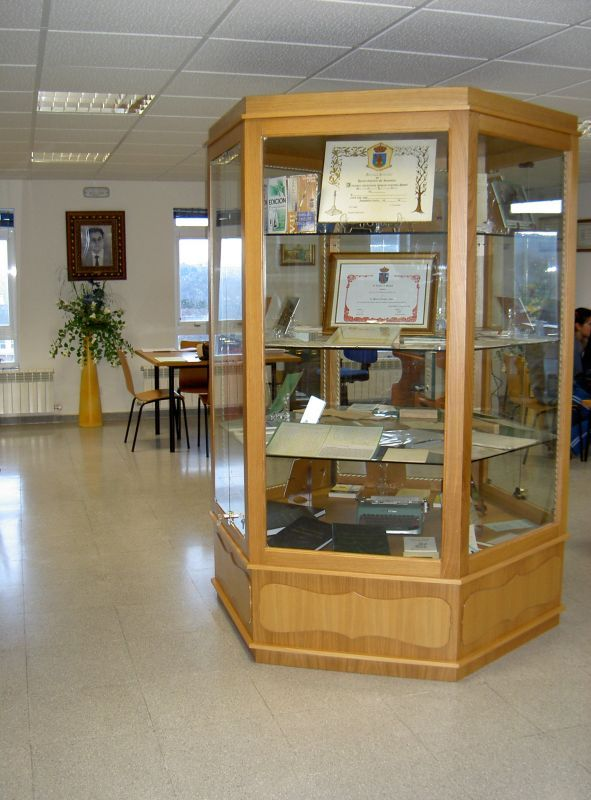
Library at the centre
