= Fruxil =

Coordinates: 42.6935°N 7.4885°W

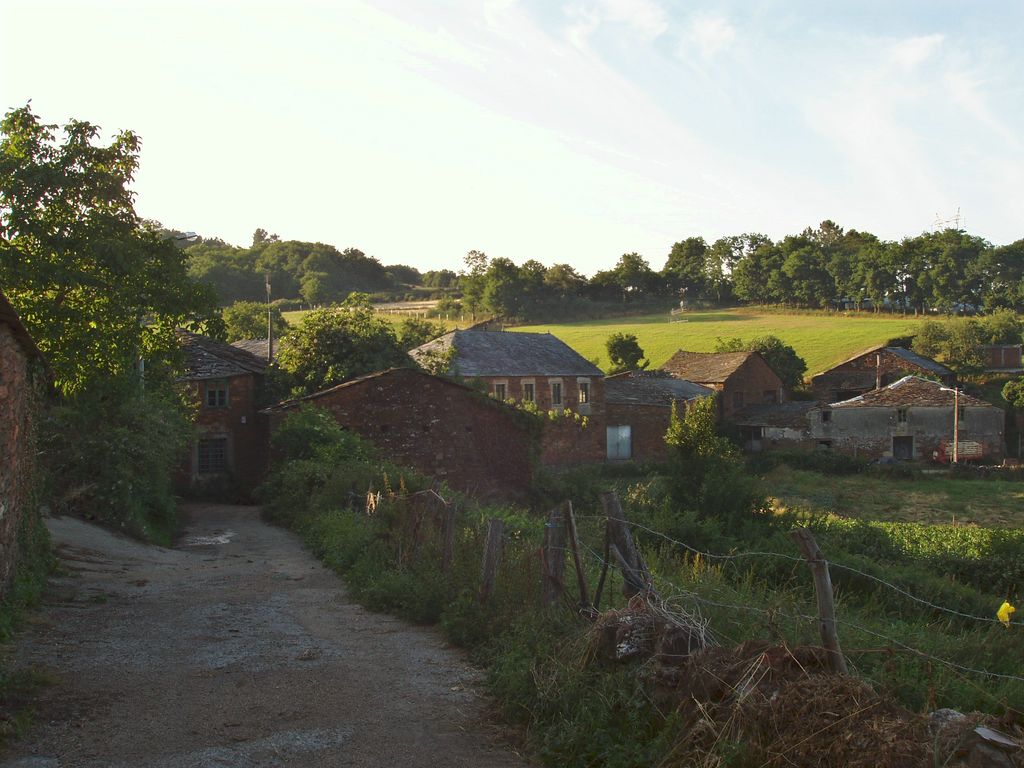
View of Fruxil

Fruxil is a small rural village in the parish of A Cervela in the municipality of O Incio (province of Lugo), Spain. Belonging to the Shire of Sarria, in 2010 it consisted of 18 houses and according to INE its stable population was estimated at 36 neighbors (19 women and 17 men).

Its characteristic horseshoe shape makes it easily recognizable from the air.
