= Sarria (comarca) =

Coordinates: 42.75°N 7.38333°W

- Comarca
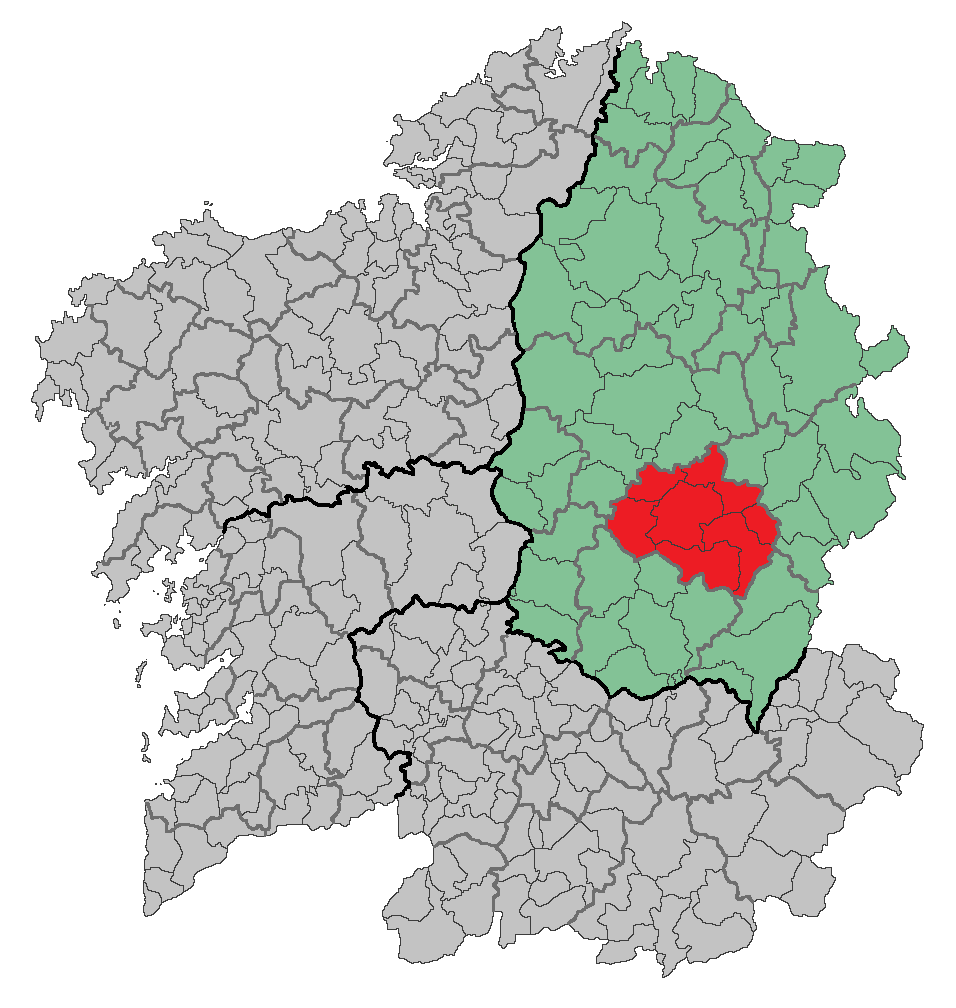
- Country: Spain
- Autonomous community: Galicia
- Province: Lugo
- Capital: Sarria
- Municipalities: List: O Incio, Láncara, Paradela, O Páramo, Samos, Sarria, Triacastela
- Time zone: UTC+1 (CET)
  - Summer (DST): UTC+2 (CEST)

Sarria is a comarca in the Galician Province of Lugo. The overall population of this local region is 22,569 (2019).

== Municipalities ==
O Incio, Láncara, Paradela, O Páramo, Samos, Sarria and Triacastela

== See also ==
- Comarcas of Galicia
