= José Díaz Fuentes =

Spanish sculptor

- Born: August 6, 1940; Sarria, Lugo, Spain
- Died: May 30, 2010 (aged 69); Paris, France
- Education: Saint-Ferdinand Royal Academy of Fine Arts; Santiago de Compostela School of Arts and Crafts; San Jorge School of Fine Arts
- Occupation: Sculptor

José Díaz Fuentes (August 6, 1940 – May 30, 2010) was a Spanish sculptor. He attended the Santiago de Compostela School of Arts and Crafts in 1958, and continued his studies at the San Jorge School of Fine Arts in Barcelona in 1964.
