= O Incio =

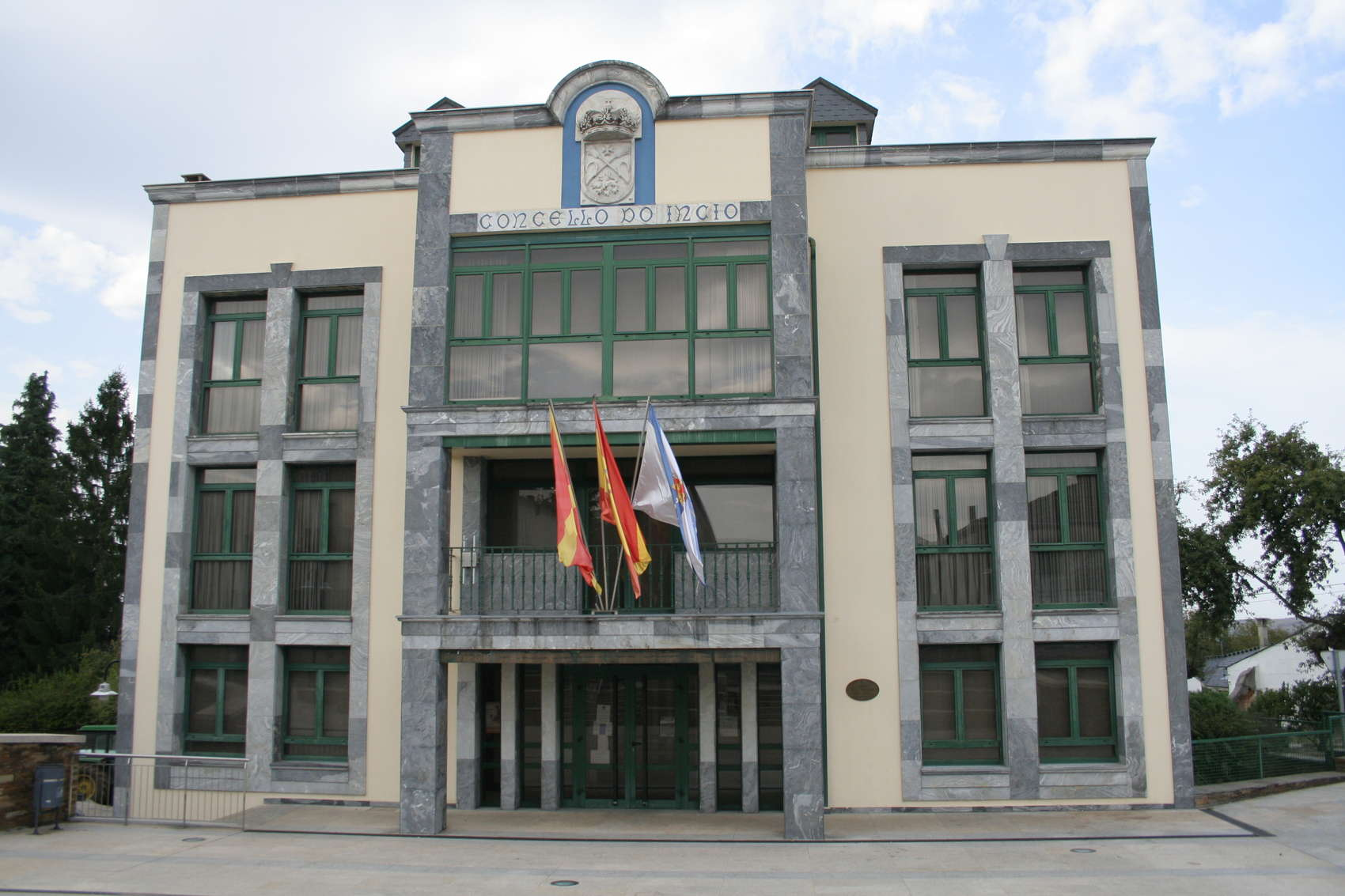

- Flag Coat of arms

- Location in Spain
- Coordinates: 42°38′55″N 7°13′48″W
- Country: Spain
- Autonomous community: Galicia
- Province: Lugo
- Comarca: Sarria

Government
  - Mayor: Ángel Camino Copa

Area
  - Total: 146.09 km^{2} (56.41 sq mi)

Population (2025-01-01)
  - Total: 1,513
  - Density: 10.36/km^{2} (26.82/sq mi)
- Time zone: UTC+1 (CET)
  - Summer (DST): UTC+2 (CEST)
- Website: Official website

O Incio is a municipality in the province of Lugo, in the autonomous community of Galicia, northwestern Spain. It belongs to the comarca of Sarria.

The main attraction is the small church of Hospital, surrounded by oak and chestnut forest in a western oriented narrow valley. It is a very well preserved Romanesque church from the 12th century, in of grey marble. Part of the decoration is taken from the ruins of the nearby Roman town of Lucus Augusti (modern day Lugo).

The municipality has 28 parishes and 187 populated places. The total population was 1533 inhabitants in 2021.

== P0pulated places in O Incio ==
- Fruxil
