= Triacastela =

- municipality
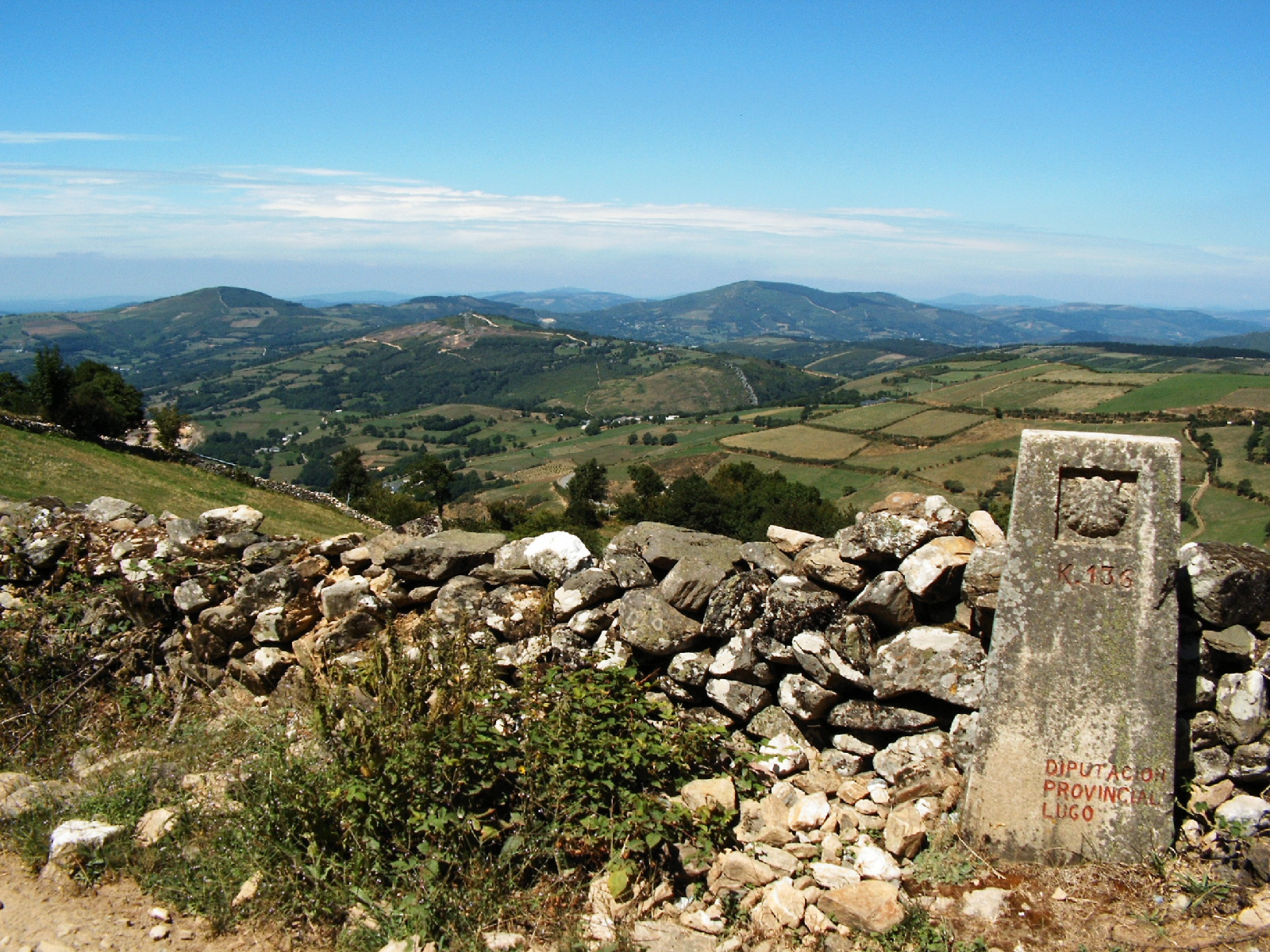

- Coat of arms

- Location in Spain
- Coordinates: 42°45′N 7°13′W
- Country: Spain
- Autonomous community: Galicia
- Province: Lugo
- Comarca: Sarria

Government
  - Mayor: Miguel Ángel Fernández López

Area
  - Total: 51.18 km^{2} (19.76 sq mi)
- Elevation: 665 m (2,182 ft)

Population (2025-01-01)
  - Total: 589
  - Density: 11.5/km^{2} (29.8/sq mi)
- Time zone: UTC+1 (CET)
  - Summer (DST): UTC+2 (CEST)
- Website: Official website

Triacastela is a municipality in the province of Lugo, Galicia, Spain. It gets its name from the three castles that once stood here, none of which exist today. Norman (Viking) invaders pillaged here in 968 A.D., but were eventually defeated at Cebreiro pass and driven off. They probably destroyed all three castles at that time.

It is along the French Way route of the Camino de Santiago (The Way of St. James), and many of the pilgrims stop in the town's albergues and restaurants.
