= Láncara =

Municipality in Spain

Coordinates: 42°52′00″N 7°21′00″W

- Municipality
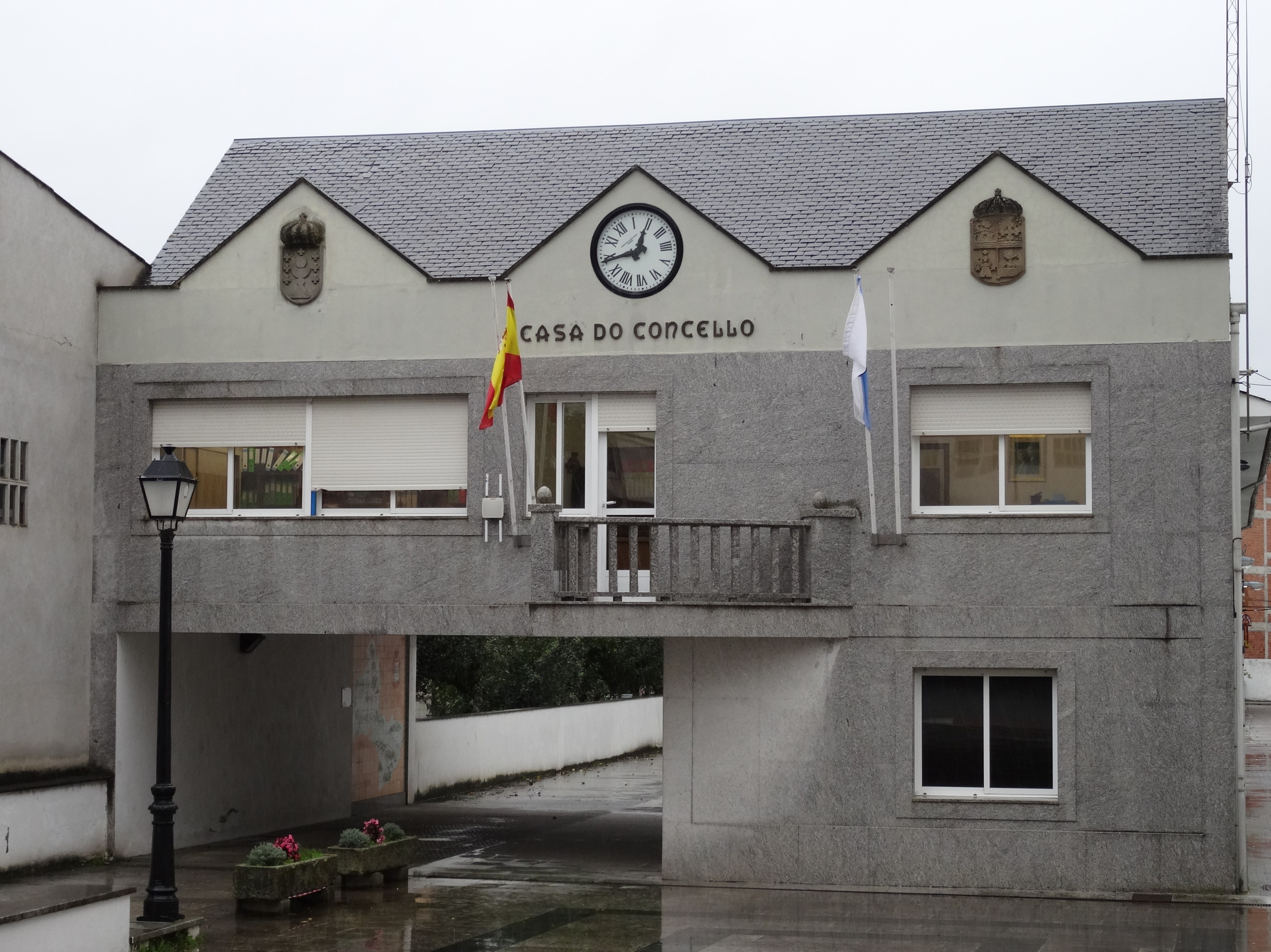
- Town hall.

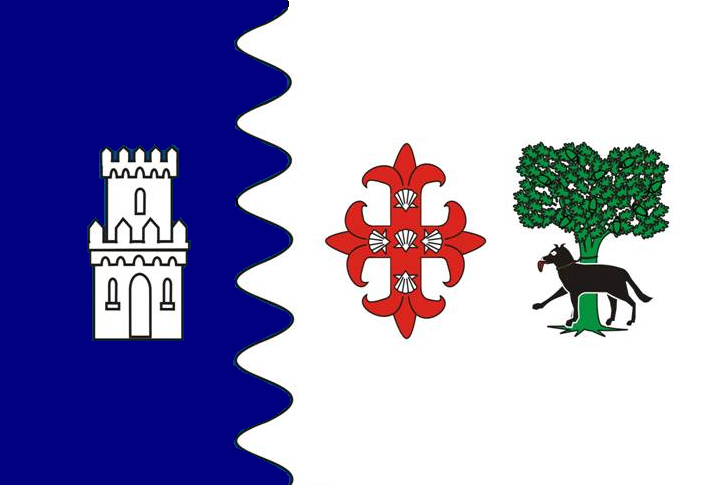
- Flag Coat of arms

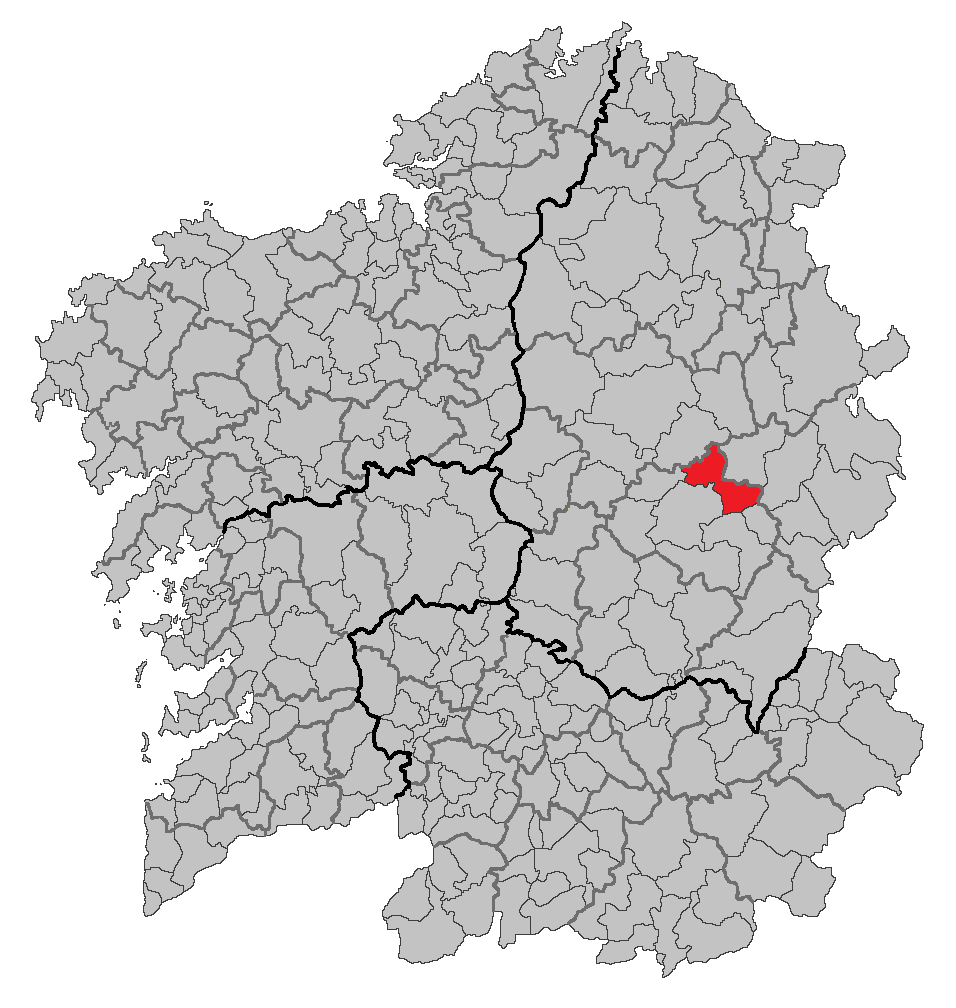
- Location of Láncara

- Location in Spain
- Country: Spain
- Autonomous community: Galicia
- Province: Lugo
- Comarca: Sarria

Government
  - Alcalde: Darío Antonio Piñeiro López (PSdeG-PSOE)

Area
  - Total: 121.61 km^{2} (46.95 sq mi)

Population (2023)
  - Total: 2,492
  - Density: 20.49/km^{2} (53.07/sq mi)
- Demonym: Lancarés
- Time zone: UTC+1 (CET)
  - Summer (DST): UTC+2 (CEST)
- Postal code: 27367
- Website: Official website

Láncara is a municipality in the province of Lugo, in the autonomous community of Galicia, Spain. It belongs to the comarca of Sarria.

== Notable people ==
- Ángel Castro y Argiz (1875–1956) – Galician-born Cuban farmer and businessman; known for being the father of Fidel Castro and Raúl Castro.
