= O Páramo =

Coordinates: 42°57′00″N 7°18′00″W

- Municipality
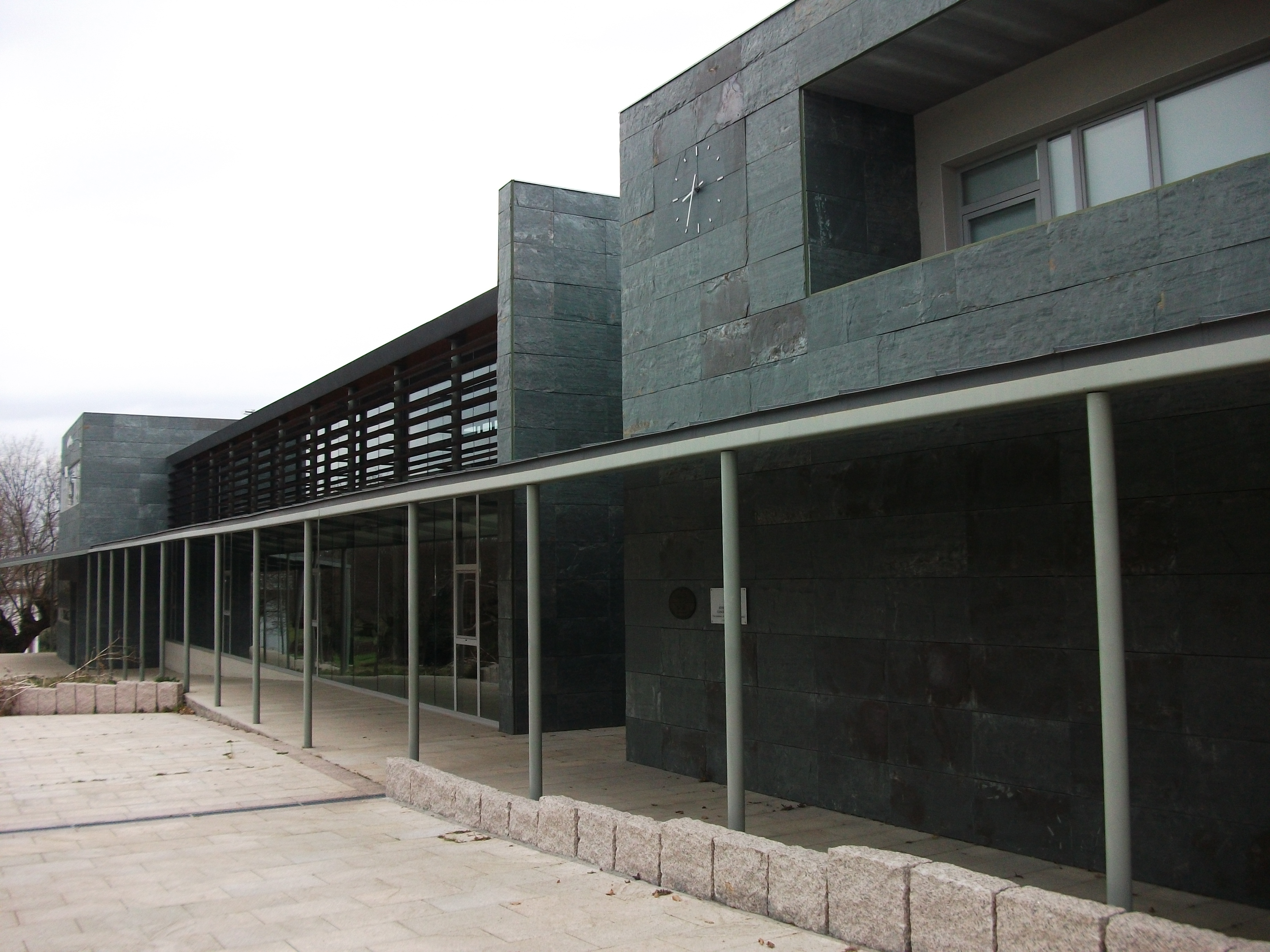
- Town hall.

- Flag Coat of arms

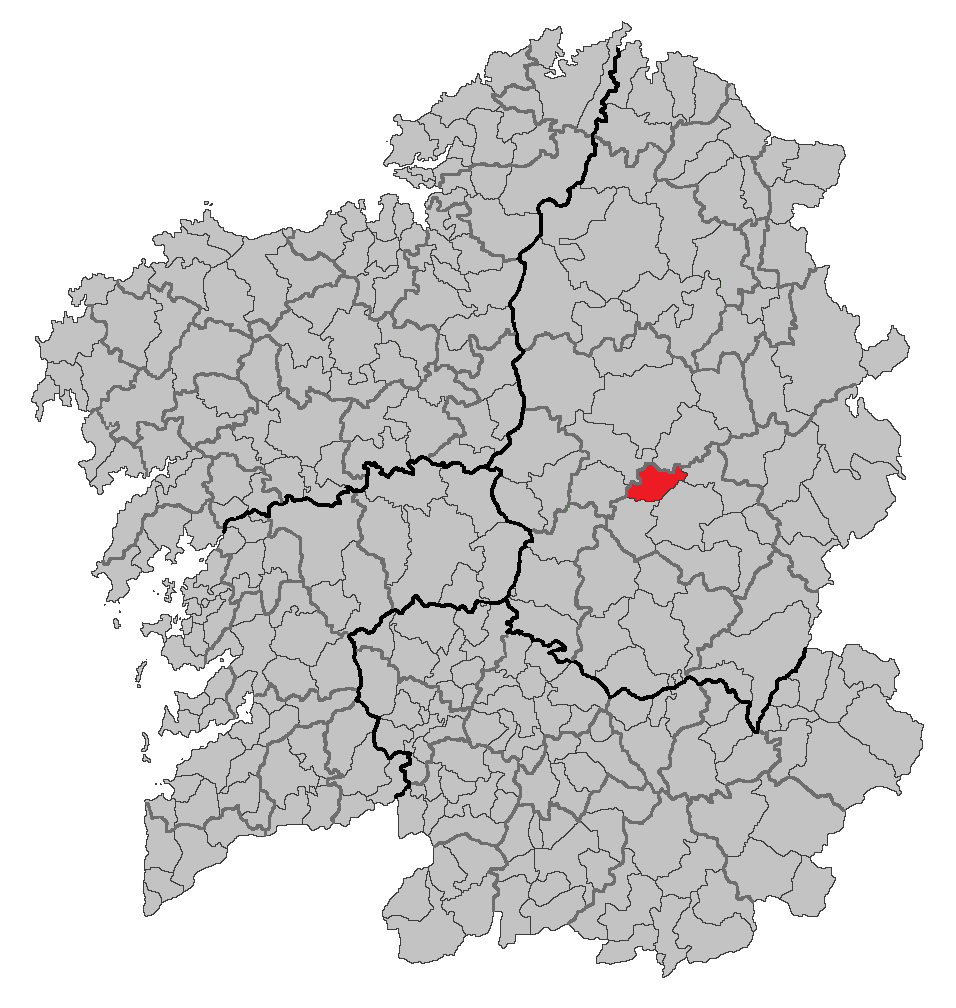
- Location of O Páramo

- Location in Spain
- Country: Spain
- Autonomous community: Galicia
- Province: Lugo
- Comarca: Sarria

Government
  - Alcalde: José Luis López López (TDP)

Population (2025-01-01)
  - Total: 1,265
- Time zone: UTC+1 (CET)
  - Summer (DST): UTC+2 (CEST)
- Postal code: 27363
- Website: Official website

O Páramo (Galician pronunciation: [ʊ ˈpaɾɐmʊ]) is a municipality in the province of Lugo, in the autonomous community of Galicia, Spain. It belongs to the comarca of Sarria. It has a population of 1632 persons (1.823 in 2006, 1.858 in 2005, 1.887 in 2004, 1.873 in 2003) and an area of 74.92 km^{2}.

== Etymology ==
The name Paramo comes from the Latinized Paramiensis. The first reference to this name is made on a manuscript dating back to 1078. However, it was only episcopal.

== History ==
The first reference made to Paramo is in the division of the eleven counties and three parishes into which Lugo was divided into at a council lasting from 569 to 572. A slight discussion is made about this council in Xoan Pallares e Gaioso's (1614-1698) book "Argos Divina, Nuestra Señora de los ojos grandes" (Divine Argos, Our lady with the large eyes), which says: "During the Council of Lugo, as said in the archives of the Church, under the reign of Teodomiro, the limits of each county were decided." In Roman times, roughly 170 Christians were killed on a hill in Paramo called Paramo hill

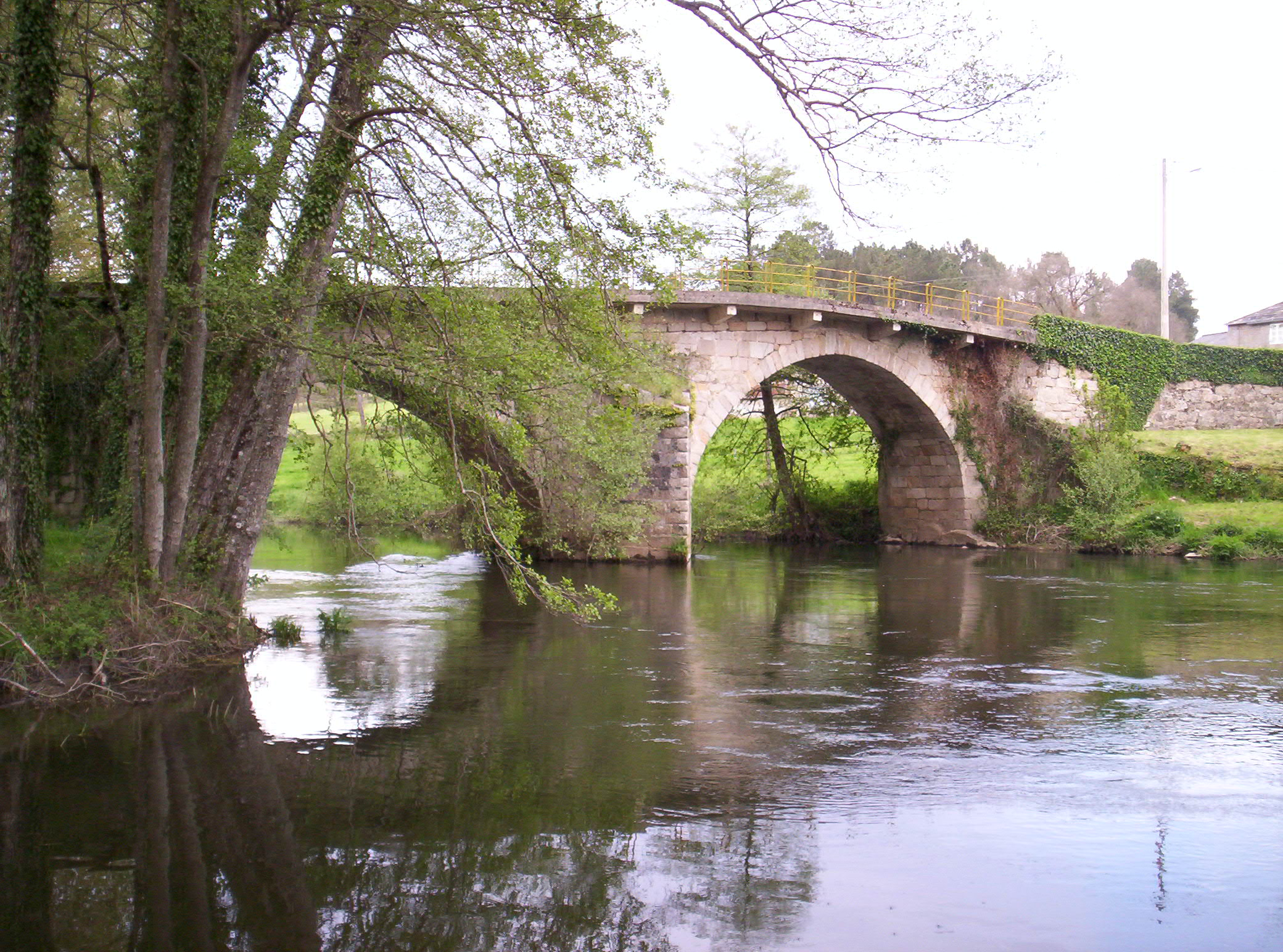
A bridge over Neira River. On the left, O Corgo; on the right, O Páramo.

== Parishes ==
Here is a list of all parishes found in Paramo, with their Saint's name or spelling variants in brackets:

- Adai (Santa Mariña)
- Friolfe (San Xoán)
- Gondrame (Santa María)
- Grallás (Santo Estevo)
- Moscán (Santa María Madanela)
- Neira (Santa María Madanela)
- Piñeiro (San Salvador)
- Reascos (Santa María)
- Ribas de Miño (Santiago)
- A Ribeira (San Mamede)
- Sa (Santiago)
- San Vicente de Gondrame (San Vicente)
- Santo André da Ribeira (San Pedro)
- A Torre (San Martiño)
- Vilafiz (Santa María)
- Vilarmosteiro (Santa Eufemia)
- Vilasante (Santa Cruz)
- Vileiriz (San Salvador)
