= Paradela, Lugo =

Paradela
- Municipality
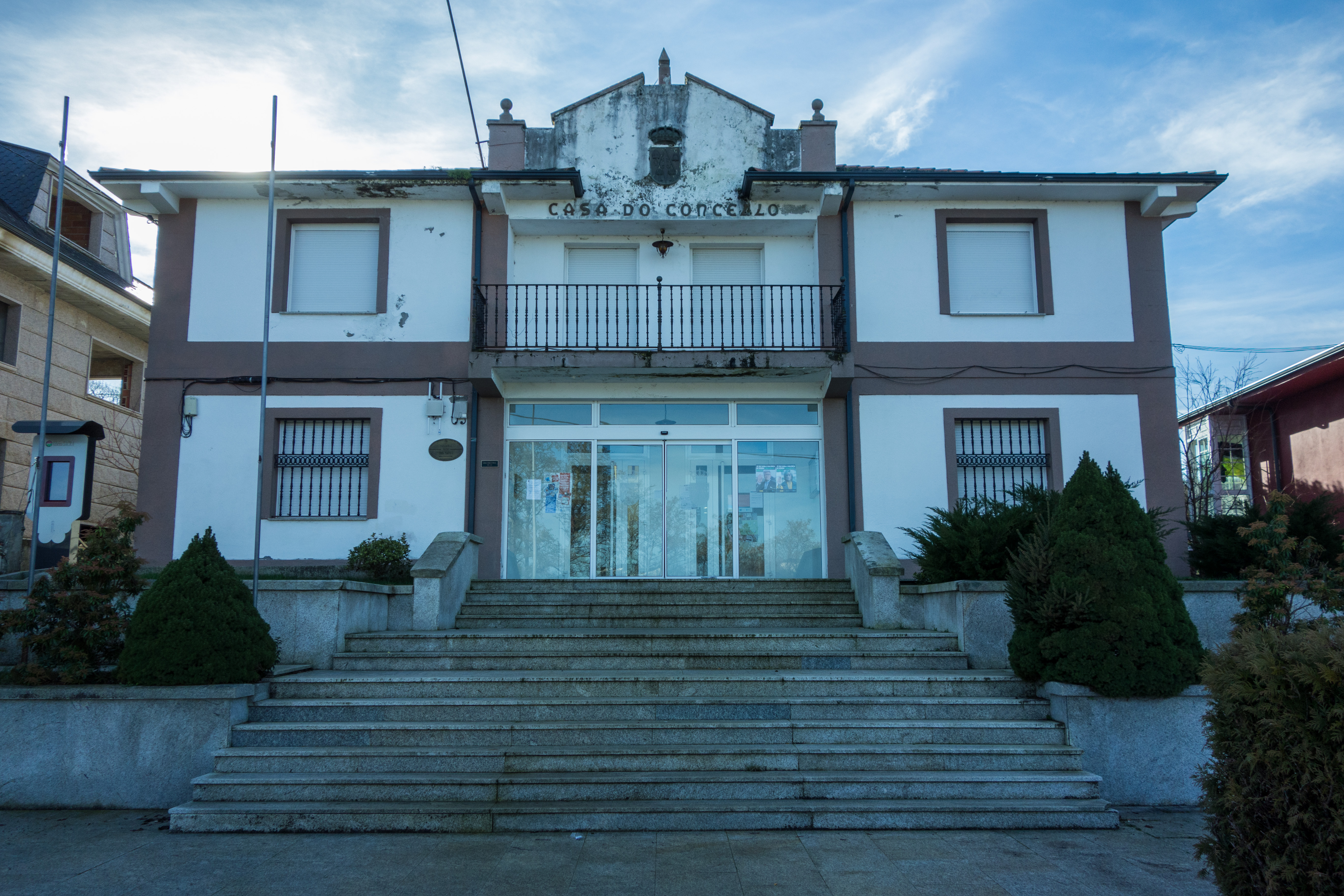

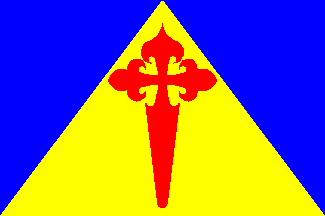
- Flag Coat of arms

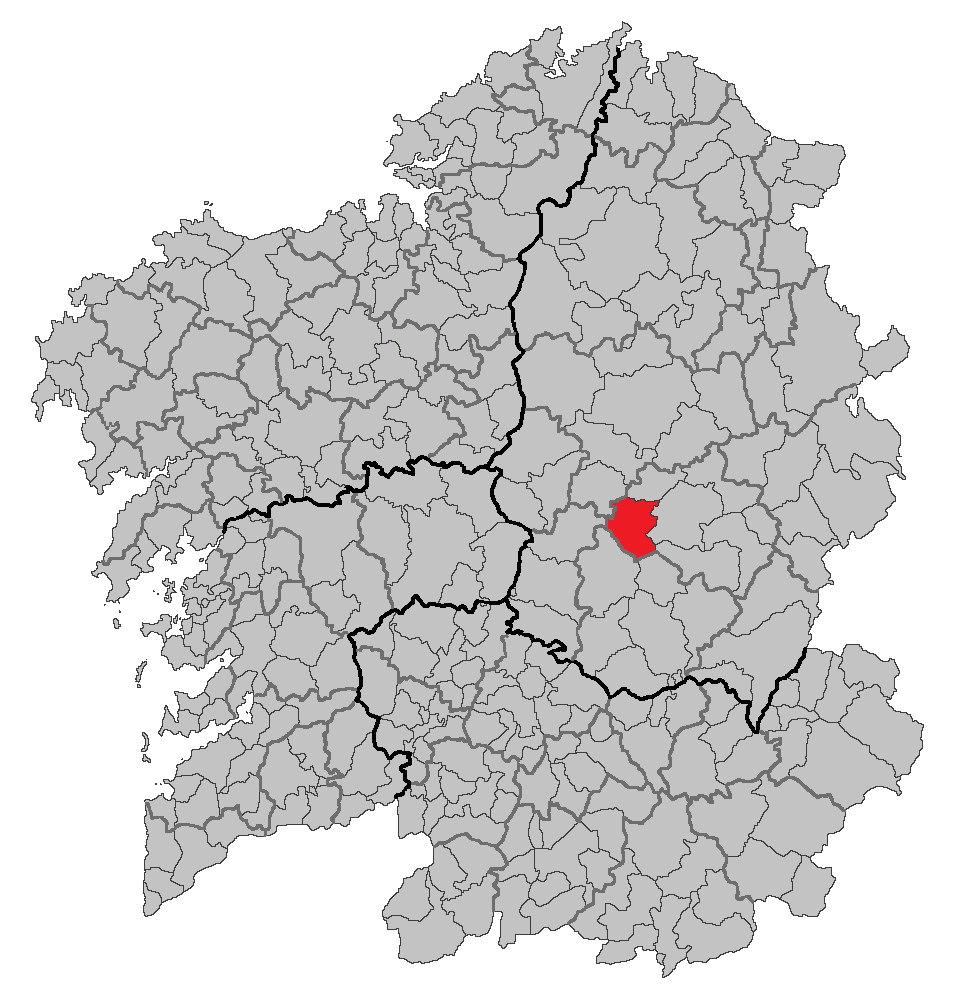

- Location in Spain
- Coordinates: 42°58′N 7°57′W
- Country: Spain
- Autonomous community: Galicia
- Province: Lugo
- Comarca: Sarria

Government
  - Alcalde: José Manuel Mato Díaz (2007)

Area
  - Total: 121.12 km^{2} (46.76 sq mi)

Population (2025-01-01)
  - Total: 1,557
  - Density: 12.86/km^{2} (33.29/sq mi)
- Demonym: Paradelense
- Time zone: UTC+1 (CET)
  - Summer (DST): UTC+2 (CEST)
- Official language(s): Galician, Spanish
- Website: Official website

Paradela is a municipality in Lugo province in Galicia in north-west Spain. It is situated in the region of Sarria. There were 2,193 people living in Paradela as of 2008 (1,101 men and 1,092 women). It is known for the connection it has with the Way of St. James. The French route of such a way, ending in Santiago de Compostela, passes through five parishes of Paradela: Ferreiros, Francos, Laxe, Cortes and Loio.

== Parishes ==
Here is a list of all parishes within Paradela, each having their own saint shown in brackets.

- Aldosende (Santiago)
- Andreade (Santiago)
- Barán (San Pedro)
- Castro (San Mamede)
- Castro de Rei de Lemos (Santa María)
- As Cortes (San Salvador)
- Ferreiros (Santa María)
- Francos (Santa María)
- A Laxe (Santiago)
- Loio (San Xoán)
- Paradela (San Miguel)
- San Facundo de Ribas de Miño (San Facundo)
- San Martiño de Castro (San Martiño)
- San Vicente de Paradela (San Vicente)
- Santa Cristina de Paradela (Santa Cristina)
- Santalla de Paradela (Santalla)
- Suar (San Lourenzo)
- Vilaragunte (Santa María)

== Notable people from Paradela ==
- Manuel Rodriguez Lopez (1934–1990), poet, writer and translator
- Diego López Rodríguez (born 1981), football goalkeeper
