= Sarria =

Coordinates: 42°47′N 7°25′W

- municipality
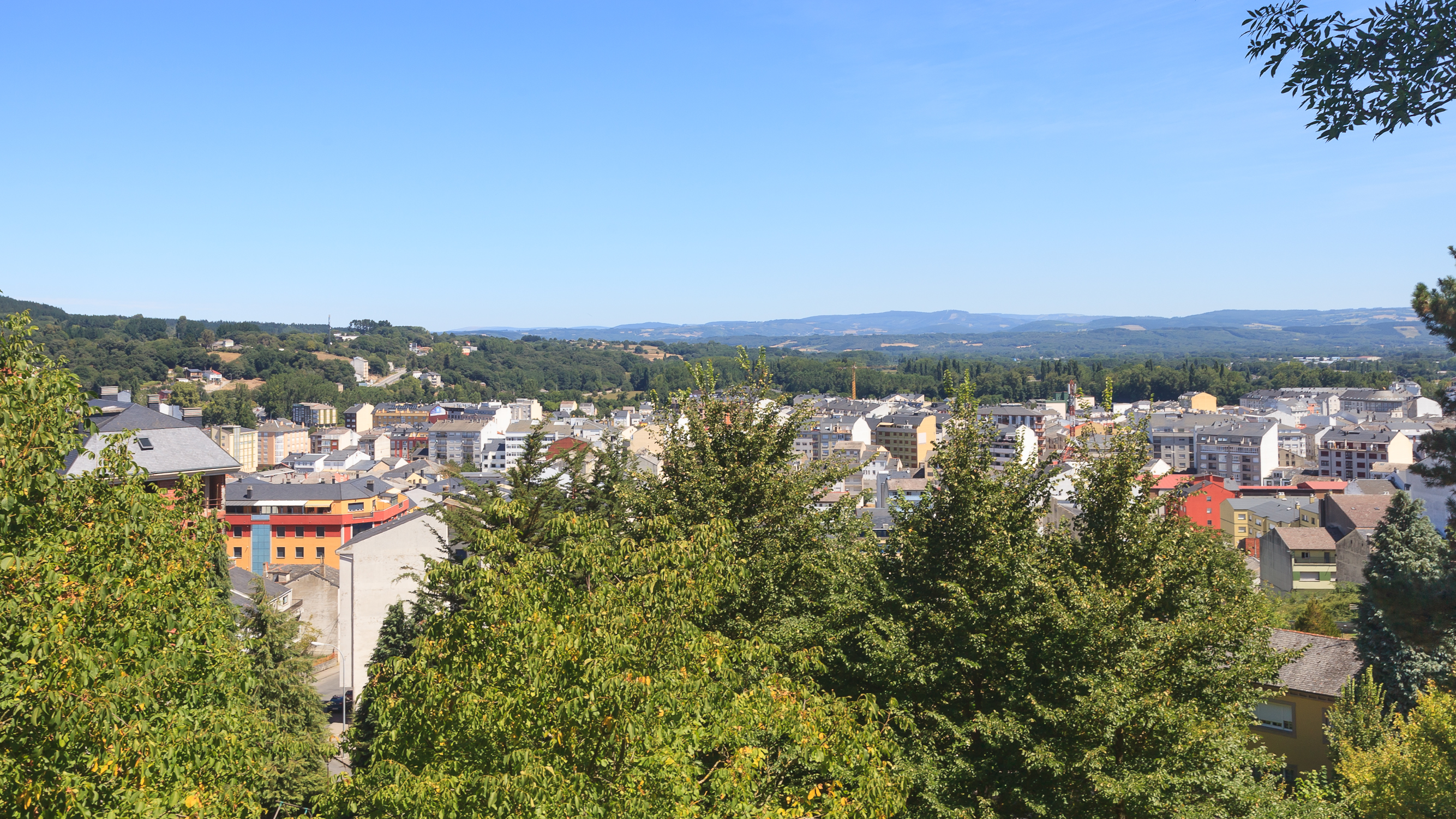
- Town view.

- Flag Coat of arms

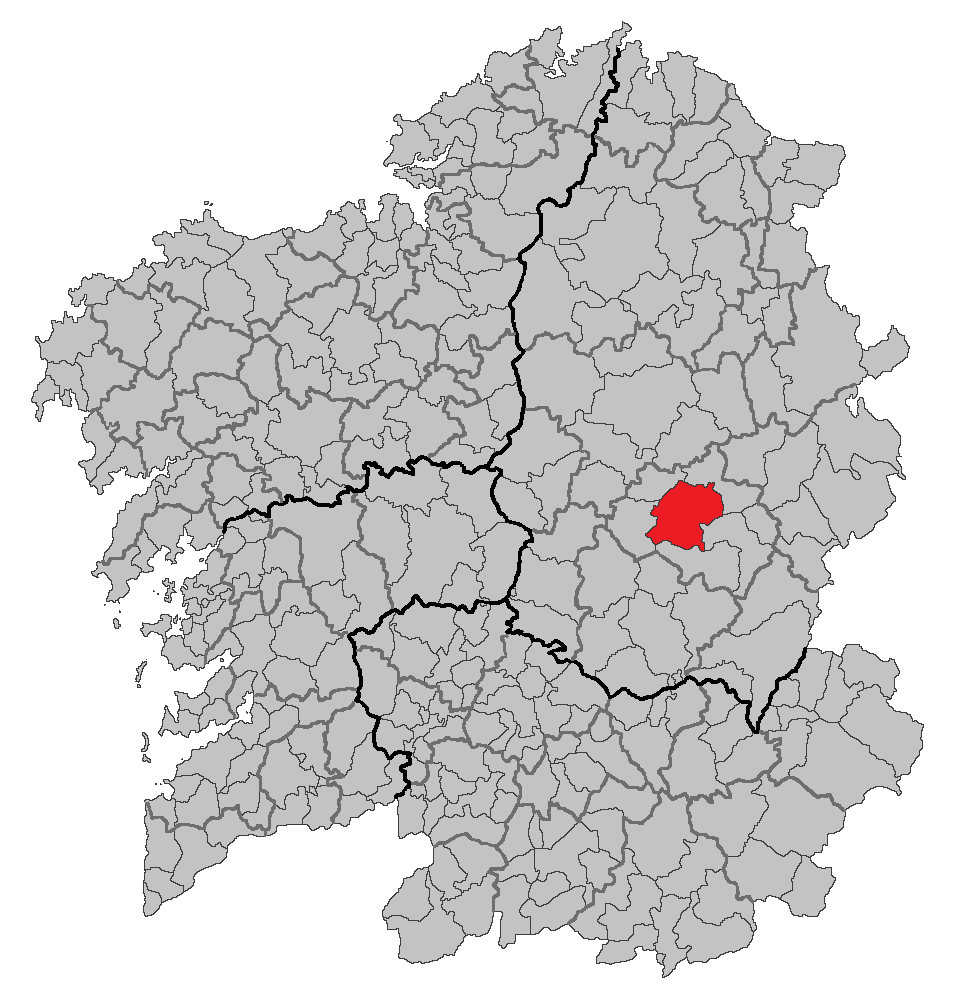
- Situation of Sarria within Galicia
- Parroquias: 52

Government
  - Alcalde (Mayor): Claudio M. Garrido Martinez
- 185 km²

Population (2025-01-01)
  - Total: 13,726
- Time zone: UTC+1 (CET)
  - Summer (DST): UTC+2 (CET)
- Website: www.sarria.es

Sarria is a municipality in the province of Lugo, in the autonomous community of Galicia, northwestern Spain. It belongs to the comarca of Sarria. It is head of the region and the most popular starting point for the Camino de Santiago; many pilgrims choose Sarria because the distance from this point to Santiago allows them to cover the necessary kilometers to reach the Compostela, a certificate of accomplishment. King Alfonso IX of León died in Sarria in 1230 while making a pilgrimage to Santiago de Compostela.

== Artistic heritage ==
Sarria's artistic heritage is primarily characterized by churches, which are essential to the Way of St. James. This includes the early-Gothic, 13th-century church, O Salvador, which is located on Rúa Maior. In this town, from its unusual rúa Maior, it is possible to see the only tower that remains of the medieval fortress belonging to the town called Fortress of Sarria.

Around this tower, a fair is held three times a month to showcase the traditional products of the area. From its medieval past, Sarria conserves the Convent of A Madalena, currently belonging to the Mercedarian Fathers, founded at the beginning of the 13th century as a pilgrim hospital by Italian monks of the Order of the Blessed Martyrs of Jesus, who were also pilgrims. The present building, which houses a small cloister and a church, is a mixture of different styles of construction ranging from the 15th to the 18th centuries. Today, it is also a private school.

It has a strategic point of view of its connections; it is accessible through railway and road, being especially important the 546 road the connects Lugo and Monforte, direction Ponferrada.

== Leisure activities ==
The township of Sarria offers a number of leisure activities to visitors, such as O Chanto recreational site, on the banks of the river Sarria. There are also options for fishing at several preserves along the river Sarria, hunting, trekking or taking horseback rides.

The village's gastronomy includes dishes like the local stew (cocido), made primarily of pork, octopus, pasty and wild game, partridge, boar and hare. Other local foods include the blood crepes of milk and egg freixos, served with cream or honey.

The economy of this Galician town is based on cattle farming and industry, especially the production of furniture. However, the importance of tourism in Sarria in increasing, mostly due to its cultural heritage, landscapes and food.

The most popular festivities in Sarria are the feast of St. Jesus, which is the patron saint festival, and Corpus Christi, during which a procession takes place. The Noite Meiga (Witch's Night) is held the last Saturday of August.

== Camino de Santiago ==
Sarria lies on the French Way of the Camino de Santiago. In 2024 over 150,000 pilgrims headed from this town in the direction of Santiago de Compostela. Out of all pilgrims on the French Way about 64% started in Sarria. Most people started their pilgrimage here in August and September.

In contrast to Saint-Jean-Pied-de-Port starting from Sarria is rather popular among people from Spain: 64% of the pilgrims had a Spanish nationality, followed by people from the USA (6.6%), Italy (3.7%) and Mexico (3.2%). The distance from Sarria along the French Way to the Cathedral of Santiago de Compestela is 115 km.

== Gallery ==
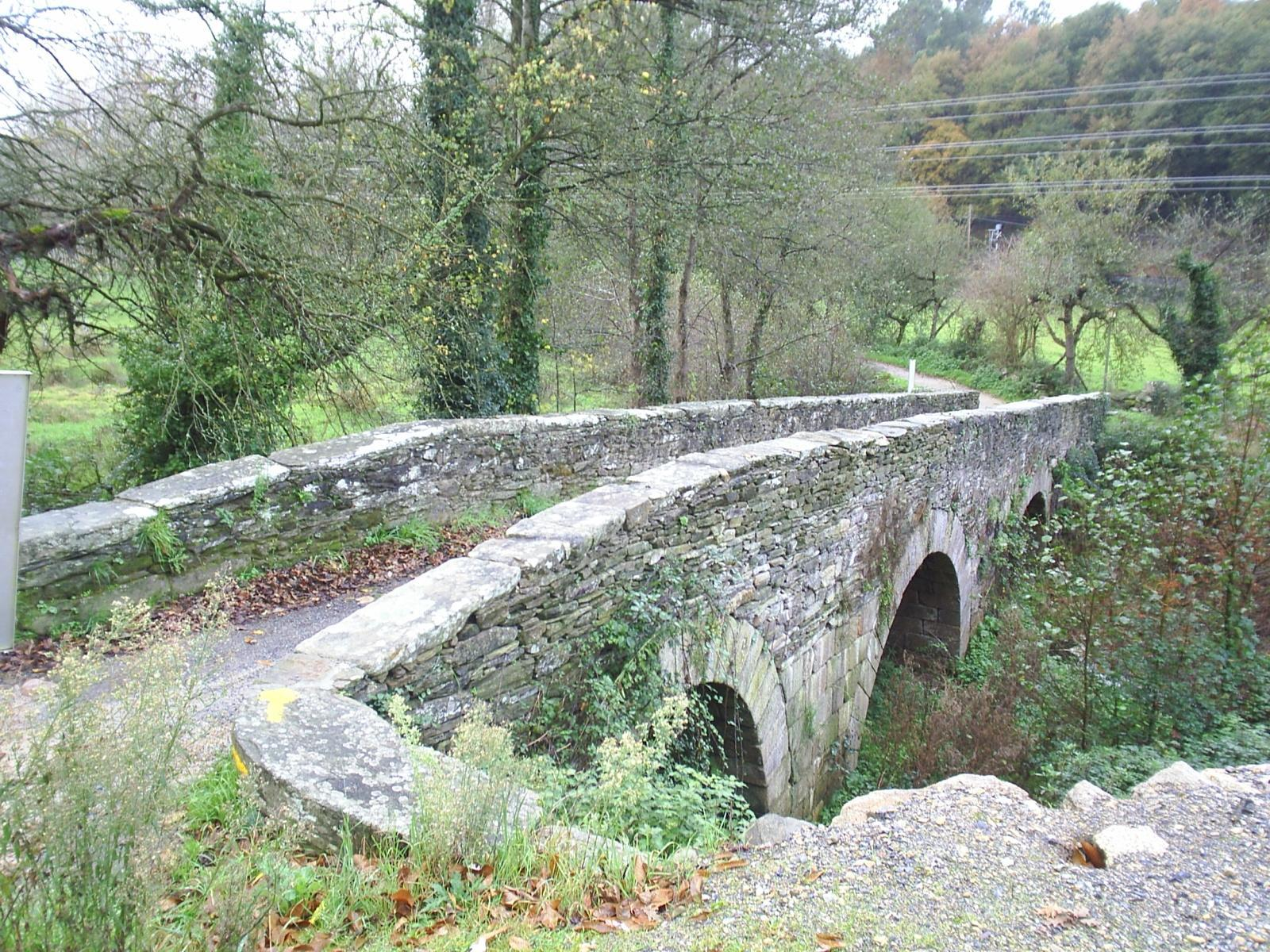
Ponte de Áspera - romantic style bridge from 12th century.

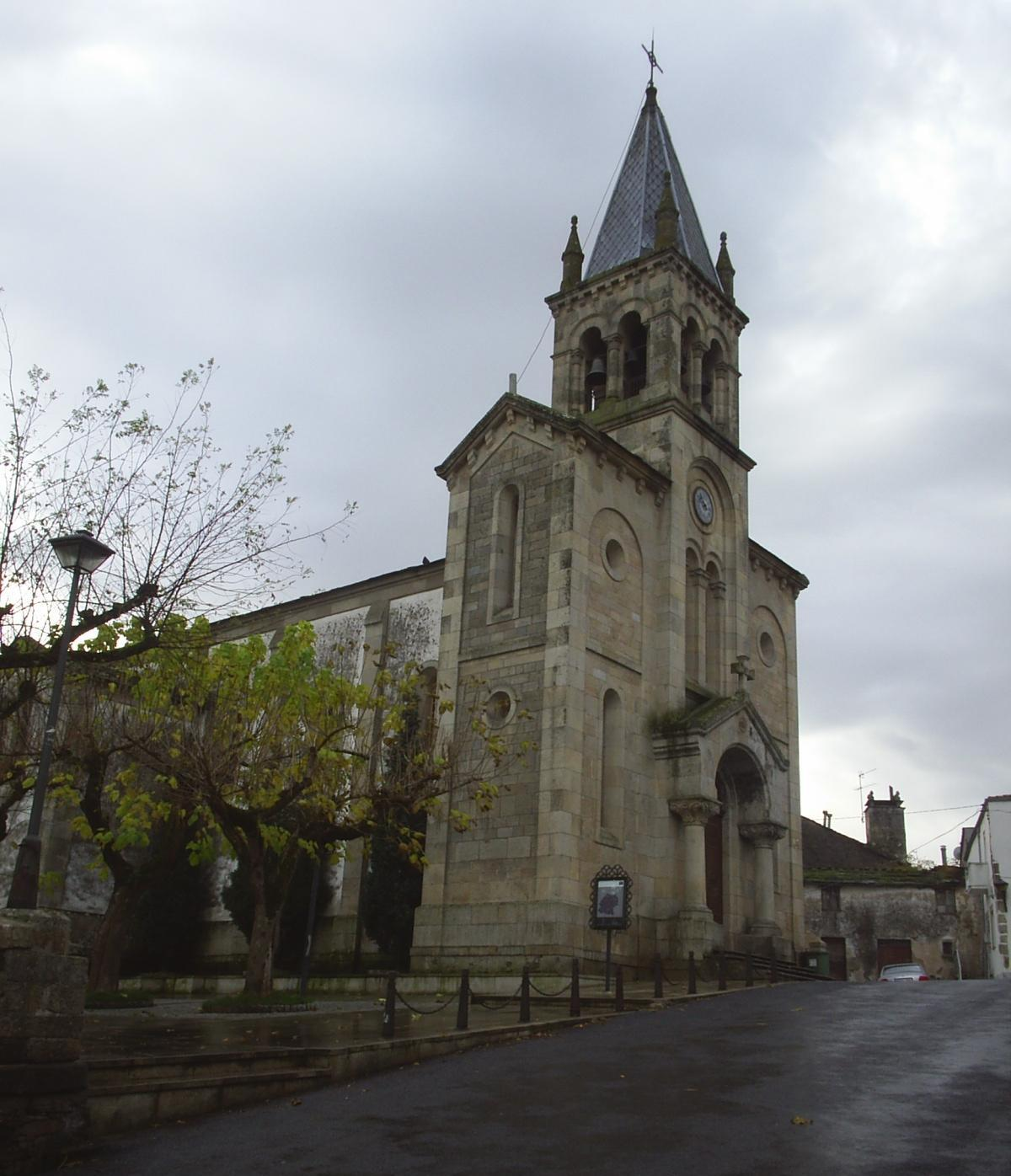
Church of Saint Mariña.

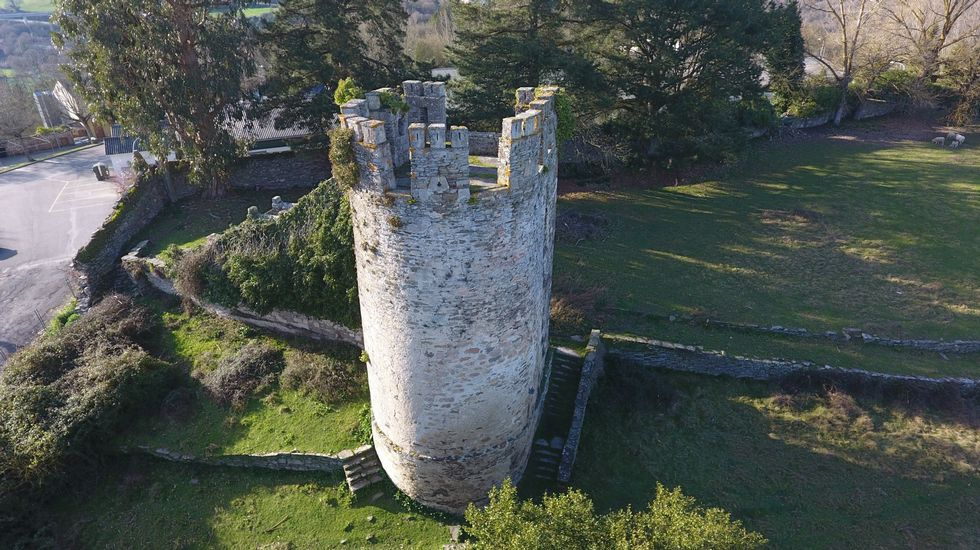
Castle of Sarria

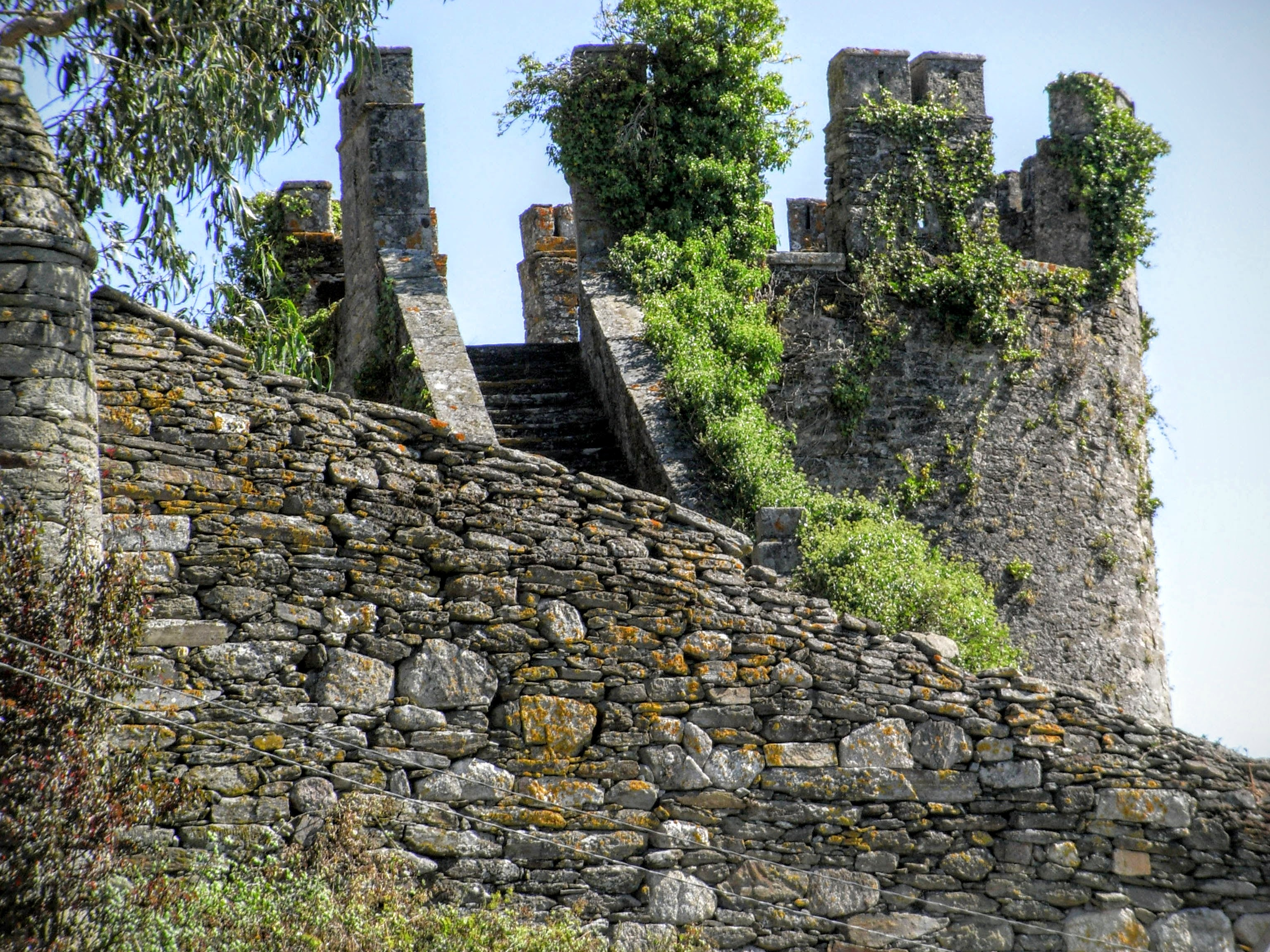
Castle of Sarria

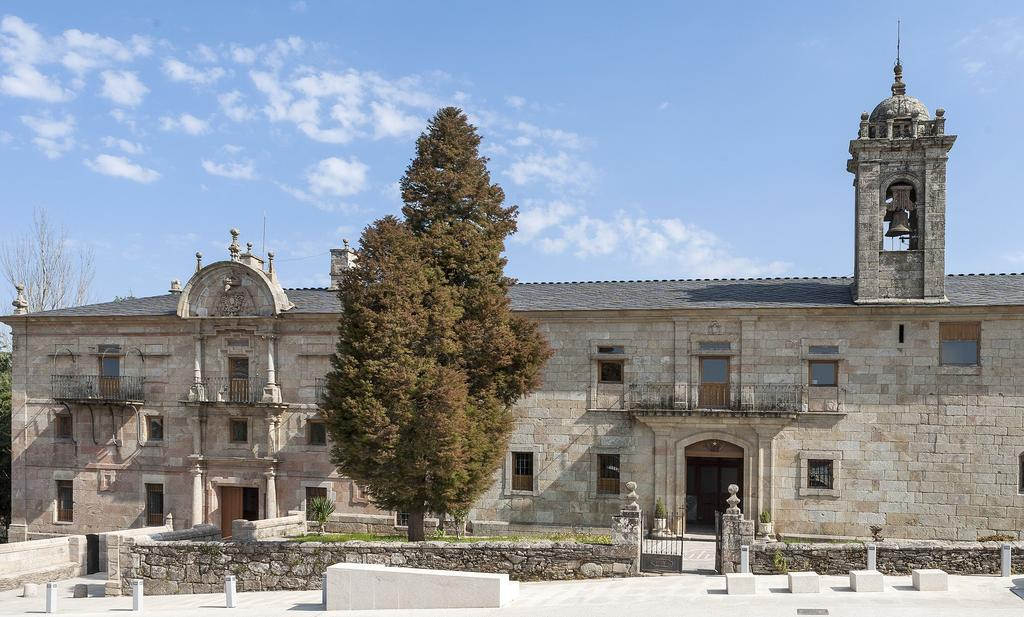
Monastery A Madalena

== Notable people ==
- José Díaz Fuentes (1940–2010), Spanish sculptor

== See also ==
- Official website
- Search Albergues in Sarria on the Camino de Santiago
