= Arzúa (disambiguation) =

Arzúa may refer to:

- Arzúa, a municipality in the province of A Coruña, in the autonomous community of Galicia in northwestern Spain
- Arzúa (comarca), a comarca in the province of A Coruña, in the autonomous community of Galicia in northwestern Spain
- Arzúa-Ulloa cheese, a cow's milk cheese made in the Spanish province of Galicia, with Arzúa-A Ulloa Protected Denomination of Origin status
