= O Pino =

Coordinates: 42°56′06″N 8°19′59″W

Concello do Pino
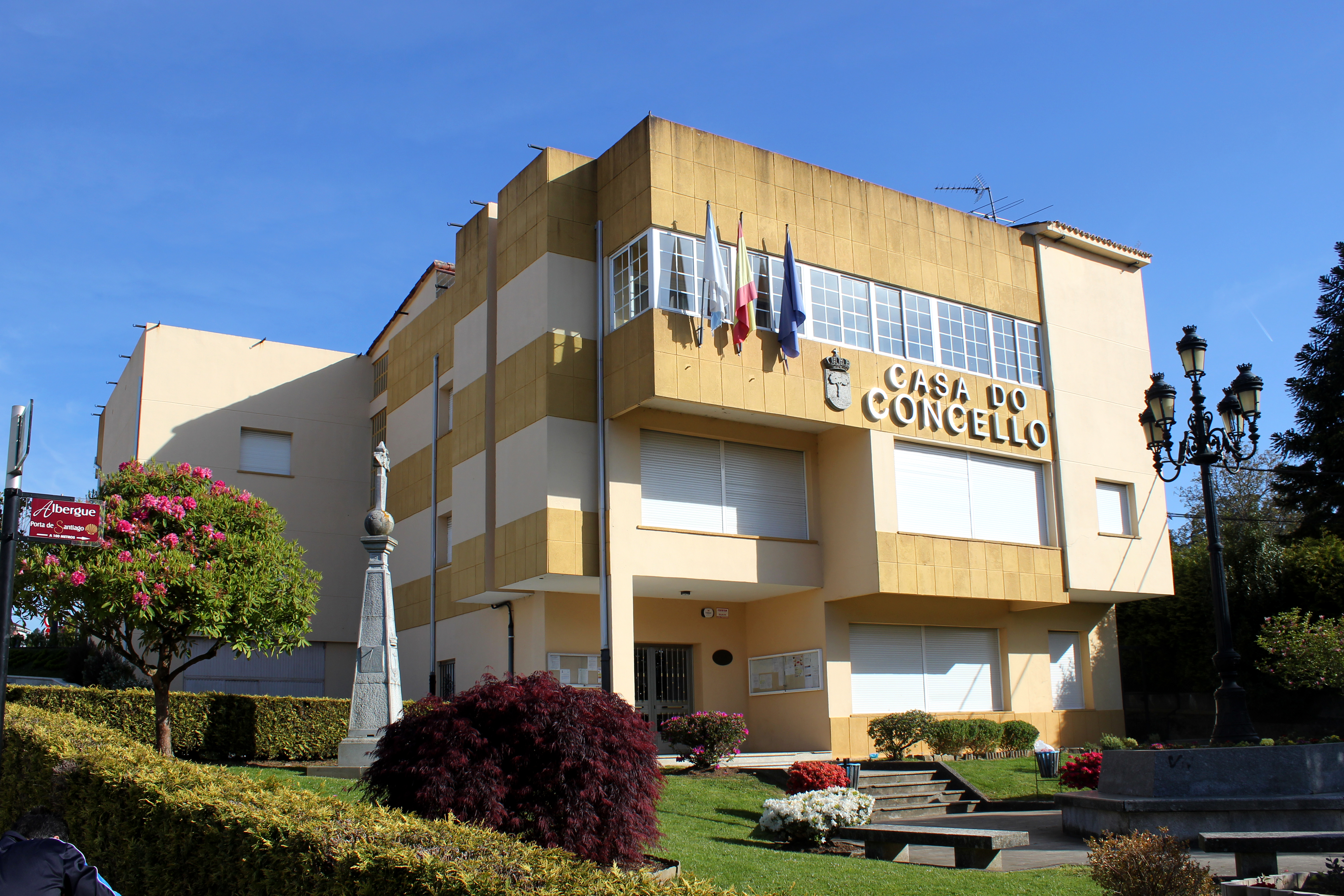

- Coat of arms
- Nickname: O Pino
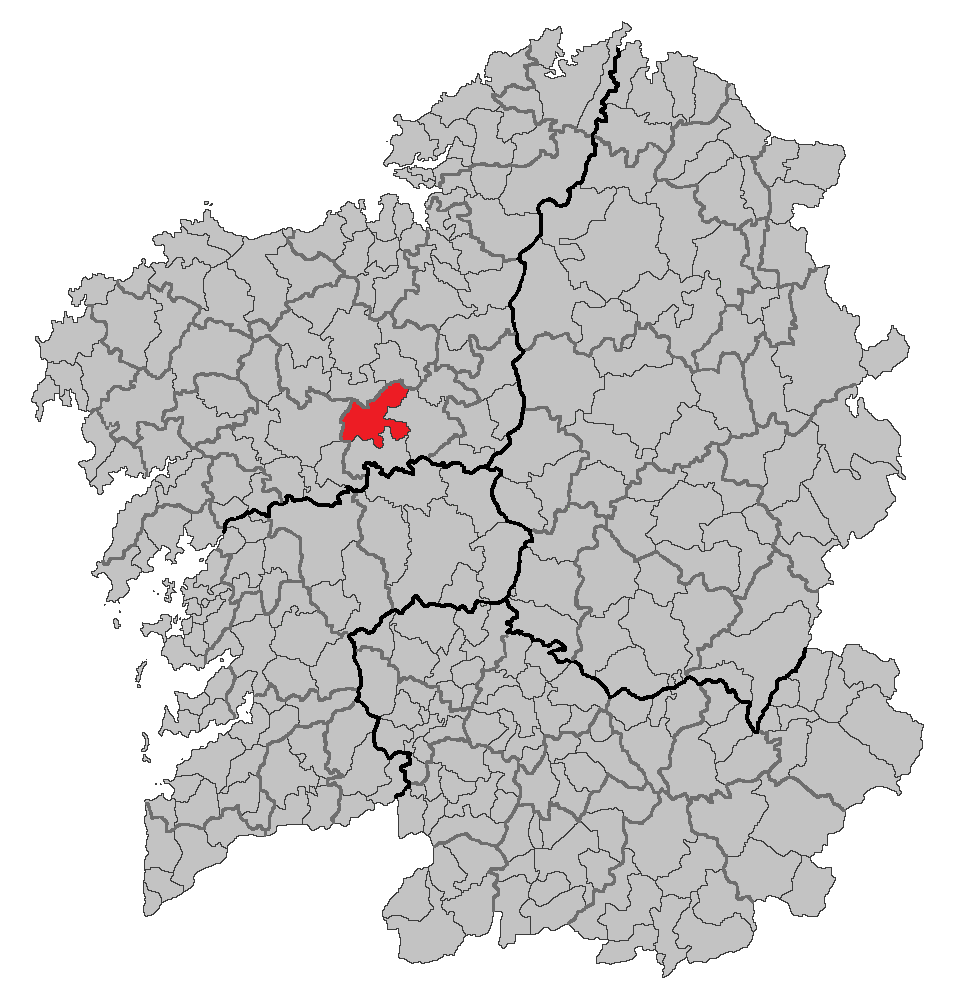
- Location of O Pino within Galicia

Area
  - Total: 133 km^{2} (51 sq mi)

Population (2025-01-01)
  - Total: 4,589
  - Density: 34.5/km^{2} (89.4/sq mi)
- Time zone: UTC+1 (CET)
  - Summer (DST): UTC+2 (CEST)

O Pino is a municipality of northwestern Spain in the province of A Coruña, in the autonomous community of Galicia. The capital of the municipality is O Pedrouzo, which is 18 kilometres from Santiago de Compostela. Several of the runways of Santiago de Compostela Airport at Lavacolla are inside O Pino's boundaries.

O Pino is bordered to the north by the municipalities of Frades and Oroso, to the south by Touro and Boqueixón, to the east by Arzúa and to the west by Santiago de Compostela. O Pino is in the comarca of Arzúa, along with the municipalities of Arzúa, Boimorto and Touro.

The parroquias (parishes) of O Pino are Arca, Budiño, Castrofeito, Cebreiro, Cerceda, Ferreiros, Gonzar, Lardeiros, Medín, Pastor, Pereira, O Pino, San Mamede and San Breixo de Ferreiros.

On its path from Arzúa to Santiago de Compostela, The French Way of the Way of St. James in turn passes through the parroquias of Ferreiros, Cerceda, Arca, Pereira and Castrofeito.

== See also ==
List of municipalities in A Coruña
