= Taboada =

Coordinates: 42°42′58″N 7°45′47″W

- Municipality
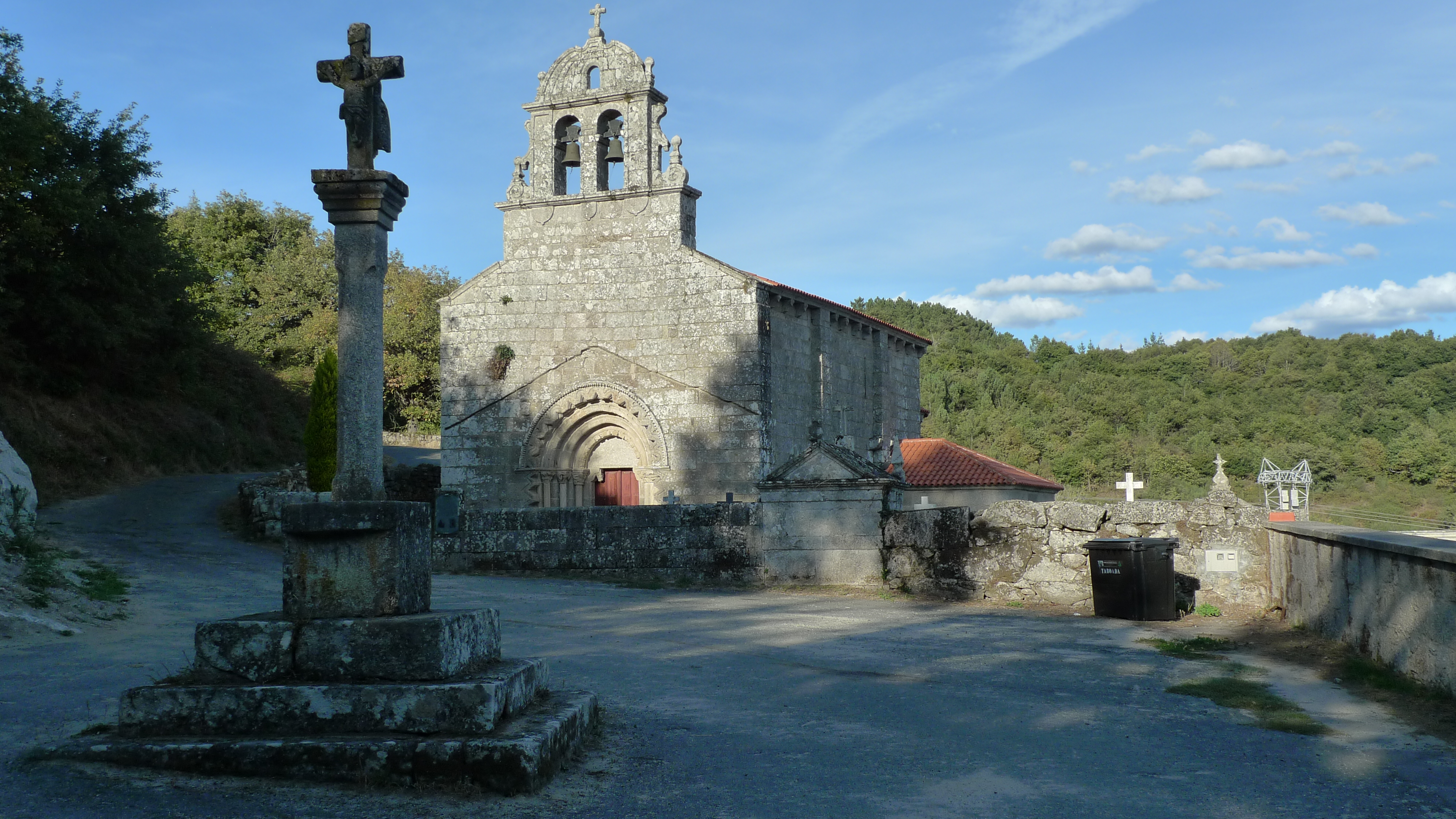
- Church of San Pedro de Bembibre.

- Coat of arms

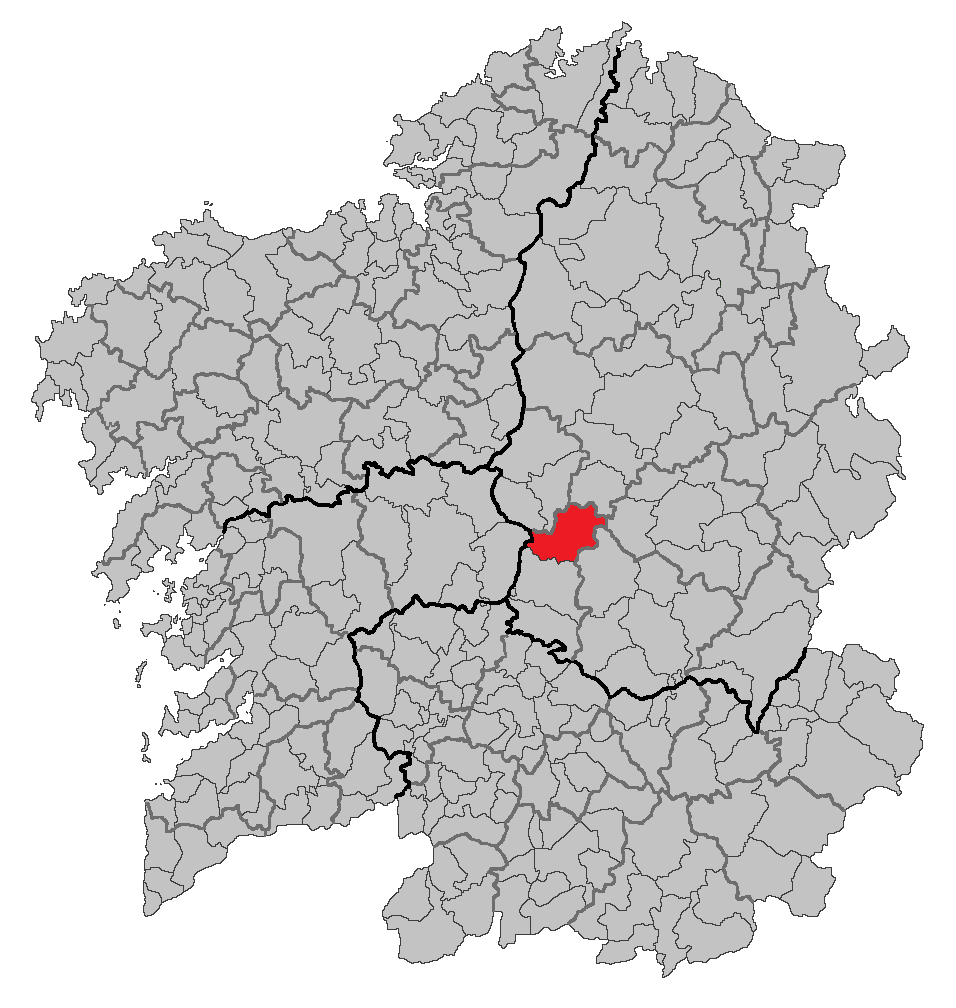
- Location of Taboada

- Location in Spain
- Country: Spain
- Autonomous community: Galicia
- Province: Lugo
- Comarca: Chantada

Government
  - Alcalde: Roi Rigueira Agromartín (PSdeG)

Area
  - Total: 146.67 km^{2} (56.63 sq mi)

Population (2023)
  - Total: 2,657
  - Density: 18.12/km^{2} (46.92/sq mi)
- Demonym: Taboadés
- Time zone: UTC+1 (CET)
  - Summer (DST): UTC+2 (CEST)
- Postal code: 27550
- Website: Official website

Taboada is a municipality in the province of Lugo, in the autonomous community of Galicia, Spain. It belongs to the comarca of Chantada. Taboada is a natural entry to the Ribeira Sacra.

With a population of around 2700, distributed in 27 parishes, Taboada occupies an area of 146.67 square km, bordering with Antas de Ulla, Monterroso, Portomarín, Paradela, O Saviñao, Chantada (the capital city of the comarca) and Rodeiro.
