= Loxo, Touro =

Galician parish

Loxo Santa María de Loxo
- Galician Parish
- Loxo
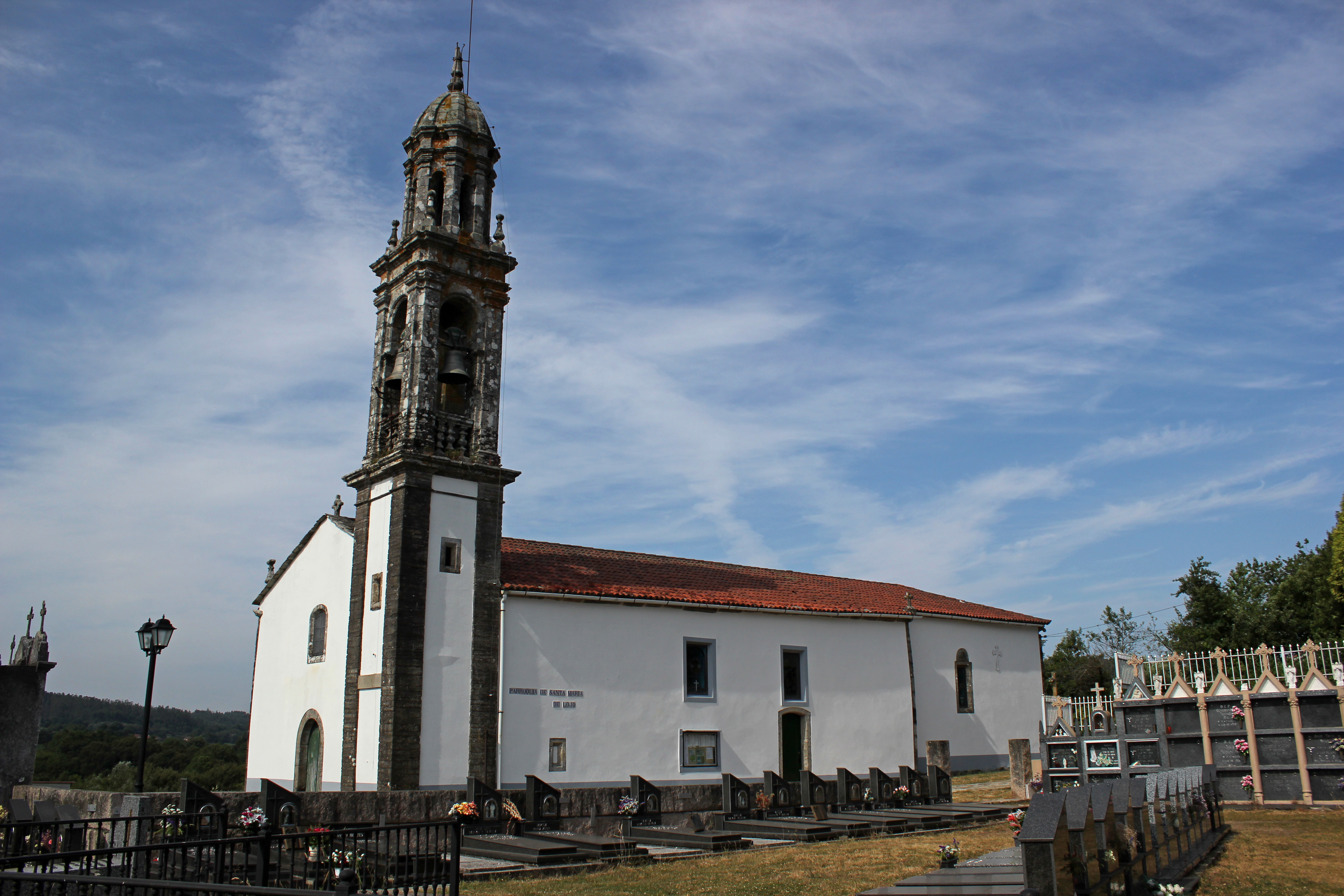
- The parish's Church

- Location within Galicia
- Coordinates: 42.8584°N 8.3416°W

Area
  - Total: 13.35 km^{2} (5.15 sq mi)
- Elevation: 264 m (866 ft)

Population (2022)
  - Total: 368
  - Density: 27.6/km^{2} (71.4/sq mi)

Santa María de Loxo is a Galician parish located in the north of the municipality of Touro, in the Galician province of A Coruña, Spain. In 2022, by IGE's data, it had 368 inhabitants (192 women and 176 men) distributed through 18 population entities, which poses an overall population decline from 1999, when it had 526 inhabitants.

== Geography ==
Within its orography the hill of Coto which stands out at 392 m. Loxo has a river, the Pucheiras, a tributary of the Ulla. In Loxo's territory a part of and old open-pit mine can be found. It was dedicated to the extraction of Copper, and it is currently owned by a construction company.

The AC-240 runs through Loxo as well as the municipality of Touro. There are daily buses services between Loxo and Santiago de Compostela.

== Economy ==
Loxo has transitioned from being mostly centered around farming and agriculture to a residential locality, relying economically on the secondary and tertiary sectors of Santiago de Compostela for a great share of the local income.

== Religious architecture ==
- Santa María de Loxo parish's Church. Building with a rectangular plant, with a semicircular arched door with moldings and a window in the tribune, with a semicircular arch as well. The belfry is a tower adjacent to the facade. The molded belfry stands out, with highly arched openings and an octagonal tall and arched tempietto, with eight openings and a cupola. This church was previously owned by the convent of the Dominicos de Santiago.
- San Sebastian's Chapel. Rectangular plant Chapel with plastered walls painted white and a gabled roof with Mangalore tiles. In the facade, a straight butted door and a square window in the center. The belfry has two openings to house the bells and is decorated with pyramidal pinnacles finished in a ball. At the top it carries a forged cross. The chapel with this name was previously located at the top of the hill of the Coto de San Sebastián, inside the fortified enclosure of a castro that bears the same name.
