= Arzúa-Ulloa cheese =

Spanish cheese

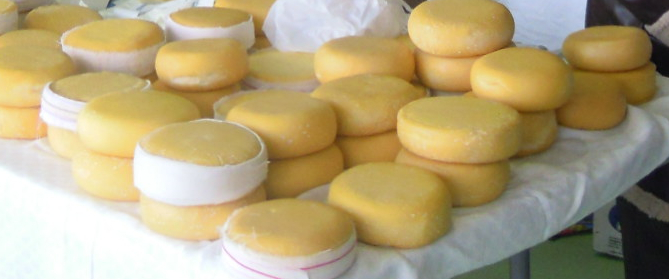
- Country of origin: Spain
- Region: Galicia
- Source of milk: cows
- Pasteurized: varies
- Texture: soft, creamy
- Dimensions: 20 cm
- Weight: 0.3 to 2 kg (0.66 to 4.41 lb)
- Certification: DO
- Named after: Arzúa

Arzúa-Ulloa cheese is a cow's milk cheese made in the Spanish autonomous region of Galicia, with Arzúa-A Ulloa Protected designation of origin (PDO) status.

It is a soft cheese, made from raw or pasteurized milk, has a minimum maturity period of six days, and has a lenticular shape, or cylindrical with rounded edges. Its rind is thin and pliant, medium to dark yellow, bright, clean and smooth. The cheese itself is uniform in color between white and pale yellow. It is soft and creamy without cracks but may have a few small holes or bubbles. The flavour is slightly sweet and grassy.

It is similar in flavor to its cousin cheese, Tetilla. Unlike Tetilla cheese, Arzúa-Ulloa has a soft pliant rind, and has a disc shape.

In addition to the PDO status, there are two other labels that the cheese may carry, farm-made Arzúa-Ulloa (Arzúa-Ulloa de Granxa), a cheese having the particularity that the milk comes entirely from cows on the same farm (its characteristics being otherwise similar), and aged Arzúa-Ulloa (Arzúa-Ulloa curado), a cheese that has been aged for at least six months, with the result that it is firmer in texture throughout.
