= Chantada (comarca) =

Coordinates: 42.6°N 7.8°W

- Comarca
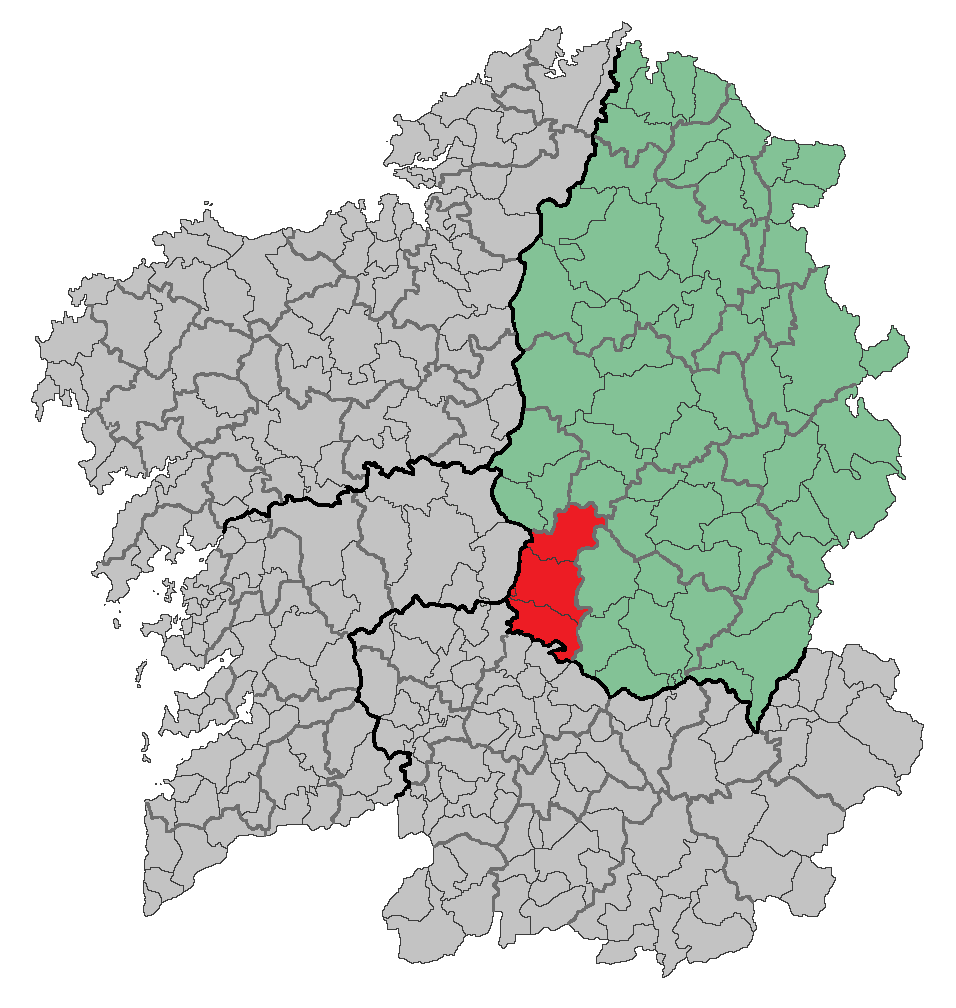
- Country: Spain
- Autonomous community: Galicia
- Province: Lugo
- Capital: Chantada
- Municipalities: List: Carballedo, Chantada, Taboada
- Time zone: UTC+1 (CET)
  - Summer (DST): UTC+2 (CEST)

Chantada is a comarca in the Galician province of Lugo. The overall population of this local region is 12794 (2022).

== Municipalities ==
Carballedo, Chantada and Taboada.
