= Arzúa (comarca) =

Coordinates: 42°55′N 8°13′W

- Comarca
- Flag Coat of arms
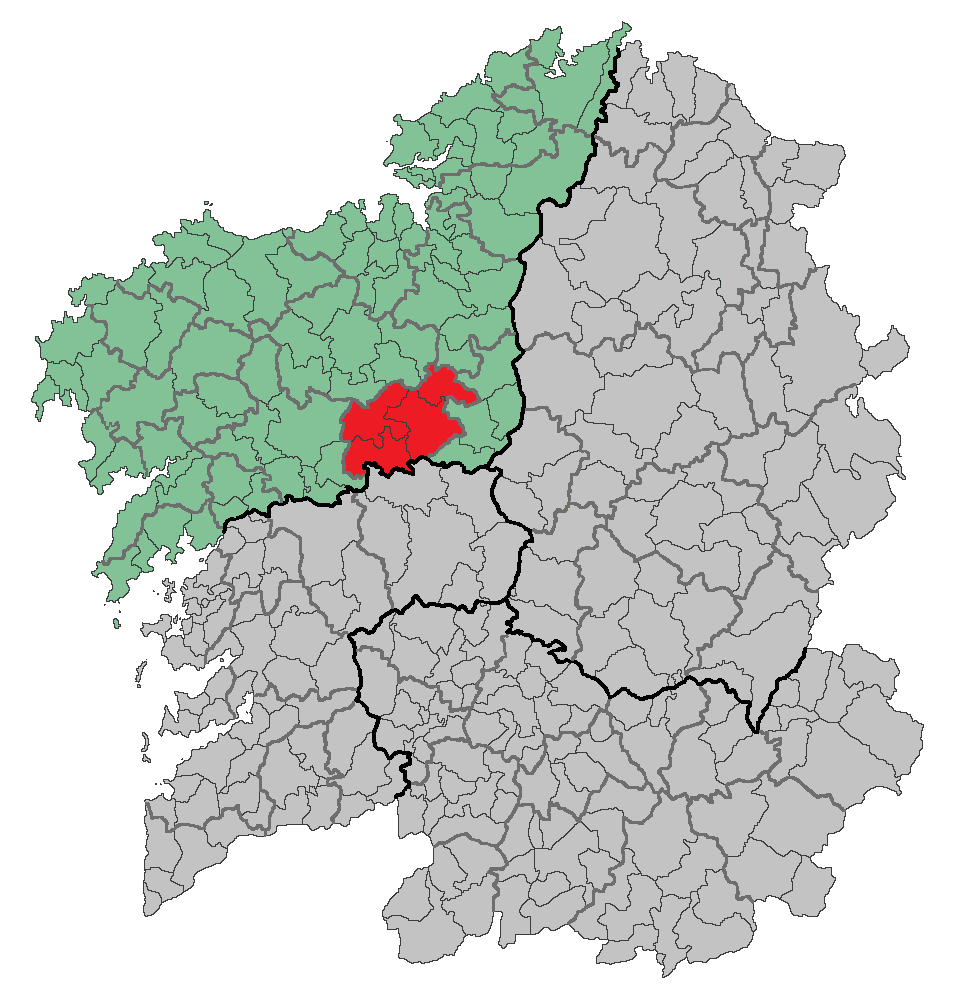
- Country: Spain
- Autonomous community: Galicia
- Province: A Coruña
- Capital: Arzúa
- Municipalities: List: Arzúa, Boimorto, O Pino, Touro

Population (2019)
  - Total: 16,241
- Time zone: UTC+1 (CET)
  - Summer (DST): UTC+2 (CEST)

Arzúa is a comarca located in the autonomous community of Galician Province of A Coruña. It has an area of 81.3 km^{2} and as of 2019, it had a population of 16,241 inhabitants.

The comarca is divided into four municipalities: Arzúa, Boimorto, O Pino, and Touro. The largest municipality by population is Arzúa with 16,241 inhabitants.

The comarca's economy is mostly based on agriculture but also has some tourism activities due to its natural attractions such as the As Eiras Lake and the San Pedro de Penas Natural Park. Traditional crafts such as pottery are also practiced in the region.

The capital city of Arzúa holds various fairs and festivals throughout the year which attract many visitors from outside the region. These events include Semana Santa (Holy Week), Festa da Auga (Water Festival) and Festa do Queixo (Cheese Festival).

Arzúa has become famous around Spain for its traditional cheese called Tortilla de Arzúa-Ulloa which was granted Denomination of Origin status by the European Union in 2008. The cheese can be found at local markets and grocery stores throughout Spain and abroad.

== Municipalities ==
The comarca is divided into four municipalities: Arzúa, Boimorto, O Pino, and Touro. The largest municipality by population is Arzúa with 16,241 inhabitants. It stands at the heart of the region and it is a major commercial hub. Boimorto has a population of 2,022 people and it is famous for its cheese production. O Pino has 4,656 inhabitants and it is known for its old churches and traditional architecture. Finally, Touro has 4,082 residents and it boasts beautiful landscapes ideal for nature lovers.
