= Palas de Rei =

- Municipality
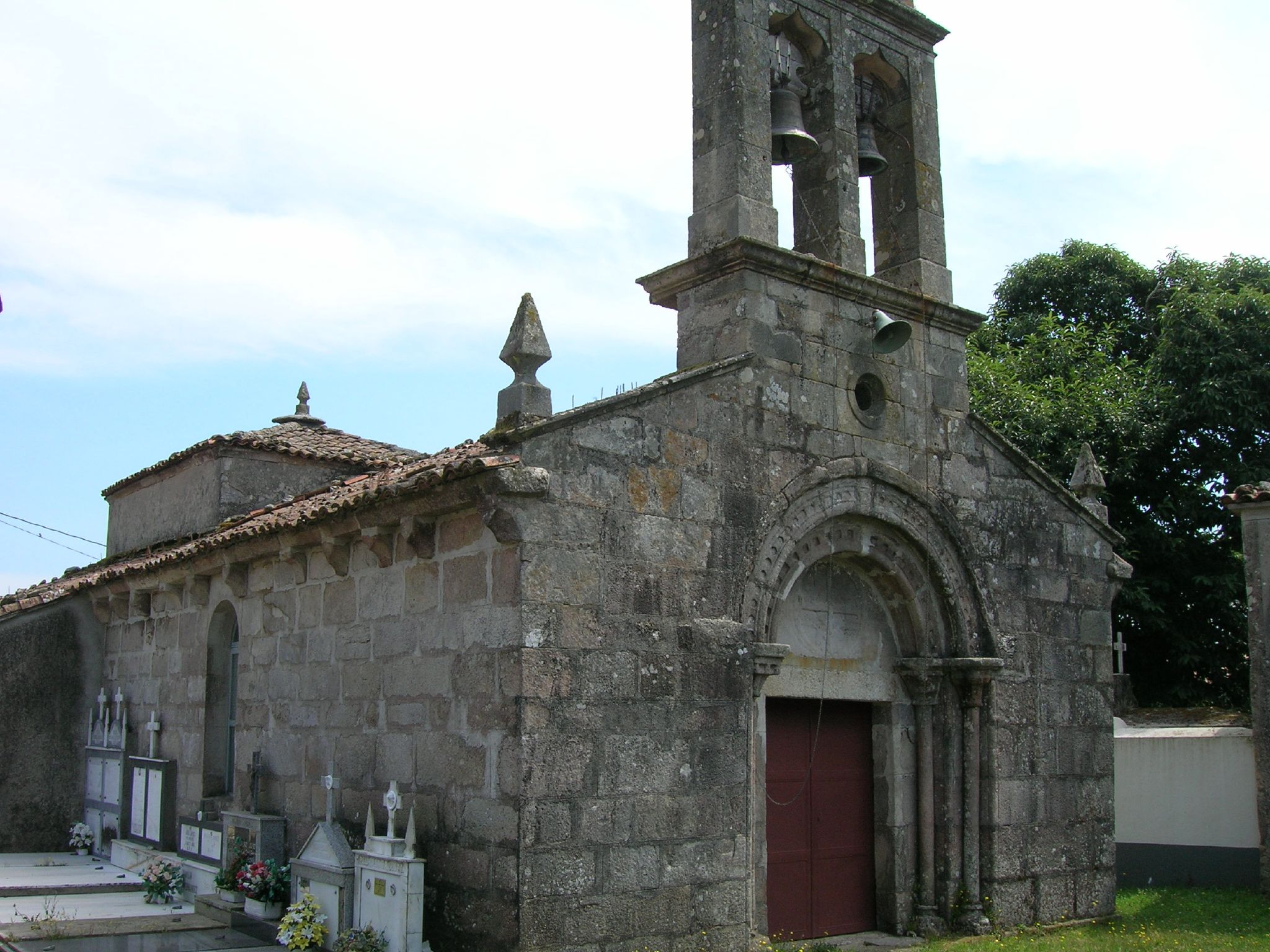
- Church of Santiago de Albá.

- Coat of arms

- Location in Spain
- Coordinates: 42°52′25″N 7°52′10″W
- Country: Spain
- Autonomous community: Galicia
- Province: Lugo
- Comarca: A Ulloa

Government
  - Mayor: Pablo José Taboada Camoira

Area
  - Total: 199.68 km^{2} (77.10 sq mi)
- Elevation: 534 m (1,752 ft)

Population (2025-01-01)
  - Total: 3,227
  - Density: 16.16/km^{2} (41.86/sq mi)
- Demonym: Palenses
- Time zone: UTC+1 (CET)
  - Summer (DST): UTC+2 (CEST)
- Postal code: 27200
- Dialing code: 982
- Website: Official website

Palas de Rei is a town in the province of Lugo, Galicia in northwestern Spain. It belongs to the comarca of A Ulloa.

According to the INE, the population was 3,268 inhabitants.

== History ==
The history of Palas de Rei appears closely linked to military culture, which retains many of the archaeological remains (dolmens and forts) from a remote settlement. According to tradition, the city owes its name "Pallatium regis" to the palace of the Visigothic king Witiza, who reigned between 702 and 710. In Palas, Witiza would have killed the Duke of Galicia, Favila, father of Don Pelayo.

The Romanesque style came through The Way of Santiago, leaving its mark on religious architecture. The church of Vilar de Donas stands out as one of the main references of Galician Romanesque, declared in 1931 historical-artistic monument. Its murals are some of the most outstanding and best preserved in Galicia.

The "Lucus Augusti" route passed through this area, and already in the sixth century was it confirmed as a part of the county of "Ulliensis", being the Middle Ages a period of prosperity for the town, thanks to the Camino de Santiago. The "Codex Calixtino" quoted Palas as an obligatory stop for the pilgrims to face the last stretches of the Jacobean route.

The town hall of Palas de Rei has an extensive artistic heritage that reflects the noble past of these lands, as it preserves remains of forts, towers, castles, as well as several mansions and emblazoned houses. Among the most important buildings we can mention: the old house-tower of Filgueira; the tower-house of Fontecuberta; the Pazo de Laia that conserves the coat of arms of the counts of Traba, of whose lineage would come the founder of Pambre; the house of Ulloa, where the Saavedra, Montenegros, Gayosos, the Deza, identified with their arms and family shields; the Pazo Mariñao; the old fortress of the Castro de Seixas in the parish of Merlán, from where this well-known Galician lineage comes; the Pazo de Pacheco, and finally the Castle of Pambre, a fortress constructed by Don Gonzalo Ozores de Ulloa in 1375, which resisted the revolt of 1467, becoming one of the best examples of Galic military architecture.

== Demography ==
From:INE Archiv

== International relations ==
=== Twin towns – sister cities ===
Palas de Rei is twinned with:

- Plouha, Brittany, France (since 2003)
