= Boimorto =

Municipality in A Coruña, Spain

Coordinates: 43.008°N 8.127°W

- Municipality
- Coat of arms

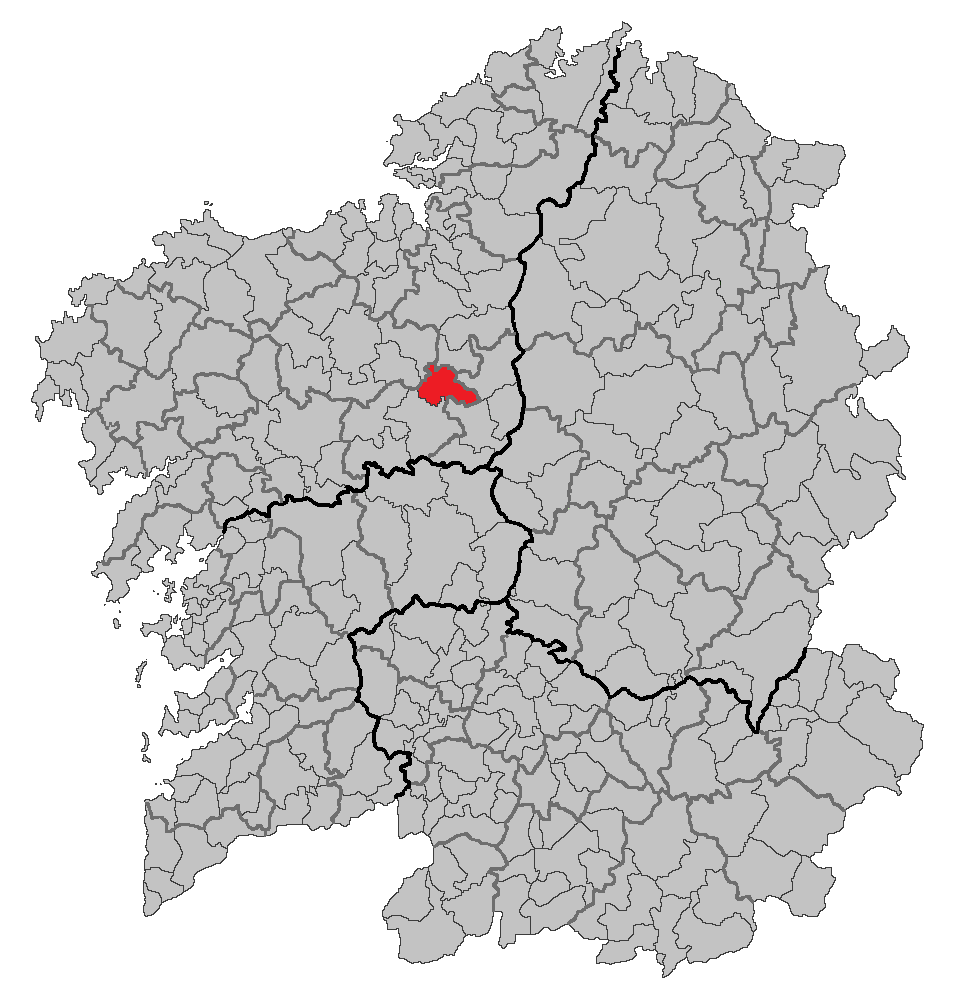
- Location of Boimorto within Galicia
- Country: Spain
- Autonomous community: Galicia
- Province: A Coruña

Area
  - Total: 82.71 km^{2} (31.93 sq mi)
- Elevation: 487 m (1,598 ft)

Population (2025-01-01)
  - Total: 1,803
  - Density: 21.80/km^{2} (56.46/sq mi)
- Time zone: UTC+1 (CET)
  - Summer (DST): UTC+2 (CEST)

Boimorto is a municipality in the province of A Coruña, in the autonomous community of Galicia, northwestern Spain. It is located in the comarca of Arzúa. It has an area of 82.71 km^{2}, a population of 2,486 (2004 estimate), and a population density of 30.06 people/km^{2}

== Place Names ==
According to Gonzalo Ramón Navaza Blanco, professor of literature at the University of Vigo, the place name could have its origin in the word bado, which would designate a step not currently used. Another possibility is that Boi refers to rocks, since it appears in several place-names with that meaning, and it has a similar meaning and refers to a site with abundant stones. This last thesis is supported by Fernando Cabeza Quiles, who claims that it could come from the Celtic voice, referring this Celtic voice to a rocky place.

== Location ==
The municipality of Boimorto, which covers an area of 82.34 km^{2}, is located in the southeast of the province of La Coruña. Its territory is represented in the sheets MTN50 (scale 1:50000) 0071 and 0096 of the National Topographic Map.

== Climate ==
The municipality of Boimorto falls within the wet oceanic domain, although in the thermal regimes it presents typical features of the interior. Besides, the influence of the sea is altered by the relief, particularly by the surface of flattening in which the municipality is circumscribed, pulling by the height of 400 m of altitude. The temperatures have slight continental nuances, especially in the winter values (6.7º in January), with the summer averages being relatively low (July 18.1º).

The average annual temperature (12º) drops by about two degrees with respect to the temperature of the coast, and the thermal oscillation of 11 °C. The risk of night frosts is very frequent until spring.

The precipitations are high, thanks to the favorable exposure to the Northwest wind and the North wind. The annual rhythm of rainfall is simple, with a maximum in winter (36% of rainfall) and a dry summer (11%), intermediate stations have a similar rainfall (24% in spring and 23% in autumn). The covered sky and the rainy days are very frequent (143 and 138 days a year, respectively).

== Demography ==
The municipality of Boimorto has a population of 2022. The population has suffered a progressive decline in recent decades, 1415 while the aging of the population increases.

== Transportation ==
Two autonomous roads pass through the territory of the town hall: AC-840, which connects Betanzos with Melide, AC-234, which starts from Corredoiras (in the municipality itself) and ends in Arzúa, and AC-934, which starts from Corredoiras goes through Sobrado and finishes in Friol after changing its name to LU-934. The first of the roads is mainly used to reach Curtis, Melide or La Coruña, the second of these routes is useful to go to Arzúa and Santiago de Compostela (via the A-54 motorway) .19 The third allows you to reach Sobrado, Teixeiro and Friol.

It is also worth mentioning the 6 provincial roads that pass through the municipality: CP-0602 (Boimorto-Sendelle-Trapa), DP-0603 (Boimorto- Orxal road), DP-1001 (Corredoiras- Mella), DP-1002 (Boimorto- Viladónega), DP-1003 (Boimil- O Gandarón) and DP-1004 (Boimorto-Lanzá).

In addition, the provincial highways lead to highways N-547 (Santiago de Compostela-Lugo) and N-634 (Santiago de Compostela-Oviedo), which pass through the neighboring municipalities of Arzúa, Frades and Mesía respectively.

== Territorial organisation ==
The Instituto Nacional de Estadística (National Statistics Institute) states that the municipality has 13 parishes: Andabao (San Martín), Ángeles (Santa María), Arceo (San Vicente), Boimil (San Miguel), Boimorto (Santiago), Brates (San Pedro), Buazo (Santa María), Cardeiro (San Pedro), Corneda (San Pedro), Dormeá (San Cristóbal), Mercurín (San Juan), Rodieiros (San Simeón) and Sendelle (Santa María).

The parishes contain the following 189 population entities:

#	Parish	Population entities	Total
1	Andabao (San Martiño)	Areas • Arentía, A • Casás, Os • Cavaxe, A • Gandarón, O • Hospital, O • Lavandeira • Orros • Parabico • Pedreira, A • Pena de Vexiga, A • Pena Forcada, A • Ponte Présaras, A • Quintás, As • Río, O • Rúa Nova • Souto, O • Torra, A • Vilar, O	19
2	Ánxeles, Os (Santa María)	Anguieiro • Campo de Lanza, O • Corredoiras, As • Coto Salgueiro, O • Igrexa, A • Liñeiro • Pedreira, A • Peroxa, A • Queiroa, A • Quintás, As • Verea, A • Vilar, O	12
3	Arceo (San Vicenzo)	Arosa • Campos, Os • Canto do Valo, O • Carballeira, A • Casa do Campo, A • Casanova, A • Castelo, O • Cerdeiriña, A • Corredoira, A • Eirixe • Guerras, Os • Leira Longa, A • Lobomorto • Muíños de Valdoña, Os • Outeiro, O • Pazo, O • Peizás • Ponte Boado, A • Ponte Castro, A • Quintás, As • Santarandel • Telleira, A • Vilaverde de Abaixo • Vilaverde de Abaixo	24
4	Boimil (San Miguel)	Baiuca, A • Casanova, A • Casetas, As • Cernadela, A • Cimadevila • Codesido • Coto, O • Covas • Cruceiro, O • Desecabo • Gárdoma • Igrexa, A • Lamas, As • Lesteira, A • Real, O • Vista Alegre	16
5	Boimorto (Santiago)	Asentos, Os • Bieite • Boído, O • Casal de Munín • Filgueira • Gándara, A • Granxa, A • Outeiro, O • Pedral, O • Piñeiro • Real, O • Rego do Pazo, O • Rego do Seixo, O • Ribadiso • Ribeiro, O • Roda, A • Sobreira, A • Viladónega • Vilanova	19
6	Brates (San Pedro)	Abuís • Barral • Bertomil • Carballido • Casal, O • Fontao • Nogaredo • Pazo, O • Pena • Pencellas • Pousada • Sisto • Valado • Vieiro	14
7	Buazo (Santa María)	Aquelavila • Cabana, A • Froxá • Sobreira, A • Souto, O • Teixide	6
8	Cardeiro (San Pedro)	Canicova • Cheda, A • Currás, Os • Freixido • Igrexa, A • Lamas • Moscosas, As • Piñeiro • Toá • Xesteiras, As	10
9	Corneda (San Pedro)	Bolecos, Os • Chousas, As • Condes, Os • Cruceiro, O • Curro Pequeno, O • Estrada, A • Outeiro • Paredes • Rego de Ará, O	9
10	Dormeá (San Cristovo)	Algaria, A • Barrio • Batán, O • Boavista • Campo do Ollo, O • Cando, O • Chavella, A • Cruceiro, O • Dormeá • Eixón • Fornelos • Insua • Marmoiral, O • Pereiriña, A • Piñeiro, O • Porcelle • Priorato, O • Proente • Ribadiso da Fraga • Rubial • Santalla • Segade • Sería • Tixosa • Vilanova • Vilar, O	26
11	Mercurín (San Xoán)	Barral, O • Cabrita, A • Campo, O • Ciocende • Pousada • Río • Romelas • Santar • Vila, A	9
12	Rodieiros (San Simón)	Aldrá • Casas do Monte, As • Furiño, O • Pena Monteira • Quiñoi de Abaixo • Quiñoi de Arriba • Rozadas, As • Vila, A • Vilar de Suso • Zaín	10
13	Sendelle (Santa María)	Abeleira, A • Cela, A • Frádega • Franzomil • Galiñeiras, As • Igrexa, A • Marco de Abaixo, O • Marco de Arriba, O • Pazo, O • Piñeiro de Abaixo, O • Piñeiro de Arriba, O • Samil • Sande • Vilanova • Vilar, O	15

== Economy ==
=== Primary sector of the economy ===
The primary sector is represented by animal husbandry, mainly dairy-oriented cattle; although the percentage of beef cows is higher than the regional average, standing at 33%. If we look at the number of cattle, according to the IGE data, the quantity has remained fairly stable, over 7,000 heads since 2000 21. In the case of milking cows, figures have suffered a sharp decline between 2002 and 2005, but since then, they have remained stable at just over 2,500 heads. However, as the number of farms has varied from 375 in 2002 to 233 in 2017, it can be seen in the graph that the ratio of cattle per farm has increased from 19 cattle / farm in 2002 to 30 cattle / farm in 2017.

With regard to the area used by farms, it can be said that it increased from 5610 Ha in 1989, to 6387 Ha in 1999 and 4653 Ha in 2009. That is to say, there was an increase in the area used between 1989 and 1999, but an even greater reduction in the 10 years prior to 2009. This reduction in area is probably related to the number of farms. In addition, the amount of land owned has been reduced by more than 500 hectares between 1999 and 2009, from 3082 hectares to 2570 hectares.

In the municipality of Boimorto, unlike many of the town councils in the area, most parishes have suffered the process of land consolidation. This was completed in 1991 in Andabao (785 Ha), 1993 in Ánxeles (446 Ha), 1997 in Arceo (774 Ha), 1984 in Brates-Mercurín (949 Ha), 1991 in Buazo (339 Ha), 1969 in Cardeiro (715 Ha), 2010 in Dormeá (1017) and 1985 in Sendelle (950 Ha). Therefore, the parcelial concentrations of the parishes of Corneda and Rodieiros are not carried out.

On the surface used for forest exploitation, after an increase of more than 100% between 1989 and 1999, this was reduced by one third before 2009. Currently, there are 964 hectares of "tree and forest species". Most of the forest area of the municipality is planted with eucalyptus, but some plots have chestnut, oak, cherry or walnut.

The municipality has one of the seven fishing grounds of the Tambre river, the Coto de Ponte Castro, where you can fish for trout, with a length of 8.5 kilometers. The upper limit is set in Mezonzo Steps (Vilasantar-Boimorto limit) and the lower limit in Ponte As Vegas (Mesía-Vilasantar limit).

It also has two hunting grounds: the Tecor de Barro and the Tecor de Rebellón.

=== Secondary sector of the economy ===
The secondary sector, industry and construction, is the last in importance by number of employed. It centers its activity in small workshops, carpentry and construction. It presents a business structure of self-employed workers or companies with two or three workers.

=== Tertiary sector of the economy ===
The service sector of Boimorto has a very traditional character, since it is based almost exclusively on small family businesses. The municipal capital, Gándara, offers most of the services. Rural tourism is beginning to develop, currently having three tourism houses.

=== Per capita income ===
According to data from the State Agency for Tax Administration, Boimorto, with an average gross income of €14,902, was ranked as the 2 586th municipality with the highest income at the national level, and 244th at the regional level. This places the municipality as 4th with less disposable income in the province of La Coruña, just ahead of Toques, Sobrado and Monfero.

Since the Tax Agency publishes statistical information on disposable income, Boimorto has experienced a slight increase in this, going from €13,664 in 2013 to €14,902 in 2016. This represents an increase of 9.06% in the average gross income.

== Public Services ==
=== CPI Armando Cotarelo Valledor ===
The CPI (Integrated Public Center) Armando Cotarelo Valledor is a public center, managed by the Xunta de Galicia (Regional Government of Galicia), which offers early childhood education, primary education, and E.S.O., where the students of Sobrado and Vilasantar also attend.

=== Child Care Point ===
The project to create a kindergarten started in 2007. Today, still in operation, it welcomes children from this and from several bordering municipalities.

=== Residences for the elderly ===
The municipality has a municipal residence, and a private residence.

It also has a day center, in which various activities for the elderly are organized.

The private residence, called Residencia Nuestra Señora de la Magdalena, is located in the place of Arentía, in the parish of Andabao. Created in 1995, it is a residence of mixed type, that is, it has a residence for the elderly, and another for people with disorders of various kinds. It has 50 places for older people.

== Historical and artistic heritage ==
=== Civil architecture ===
- Pazo de Vieite, in Boimorto, is used as a habitual residence and agricultural exploitation. The gateway that limits the access presents in its central part a coat of arms.
- Pazo de Vilanova, in Dormeá, is a walled country house with dovecote. Its construction dates from the sixteenth century. The main building has a square floor that corresponds to different construction stages. On the back there is a large angular balcony with baroque balustrade. It owns two coats of arms, one belongs to the family of the Castros and another to the Ulloa.
- Casa del Marco in Sendelle, private property of the seventeenth century. The main door presents a semicircular arch, framed in stonework and over it a shield.
- Andabao Tower, it is not a tower, but a mansion. It is restored and has a coat of arms on the main facade. At present, it is habitual residence.

=== Religious architecture ===
The City Hall of Boimorto has 12 churches and 5 chapels. The most outstanding are:

- Church of Santa María in Sendelle, Sendelle, from the 12th century, with only one nave and lateral sanctity. It has great architectural and pictorial value. Inside it hides the most important part with some paintings.
- Church of Santa María in Os Ánxeles, Os Ánxeles, probably its origin goes back to the second half of the 12th century. It is a rebuilt church that preserves Romanesque remains. The frontage has a lintel led door and in it is the image of the Virgin.
- Parochial Church of San Martiño in Andabao, Andabao, nineteenth century and baroque style. Its facade is far from the usual, since it has an entrance door formed by a large semicircular arch finished in a triangular pediment on glued columns. The access ladder is of recent creation and in the later part a shield appears in which it reads "anus 1807" ("year 1807").
- Parochial Church of San Cristovo in Dormeá, Dormeá, of Romanesque style. The main frontage is from a later period, probably from the 19th century, as it apparently shows a neoclassical style, with a lintel cover, a semicircular central Oculus, a split pinnacle with pinnacles at the ends.

=== Industrial heritage ===
Brickyard de Boimil, large-scale installation, which represents the tradition and modernity in the manufacture of tiles and which worked until the late 1990s. It was the most important installation in the area. It is currently rehabilitated.

=== Archaeological heritage ===
- Forest above, As Corredoiras, site in which were found various ceramic fragments of the Chalcolithic-Bronze Age.
- Mámoa of Crollos Brancos, Mámoa of Pinar (well preserved), Mámoas on Monte of the Cabrita (belong to the Neolithic and are well preserved).
- Hillfort de as Corredoiras (partially destroyed), Hillfort of the Marco de Arriba (partially destroyed), Hillfort of Pousada (partially preserved), Hillfort of the Medorras (only an original third remains), Hillfort of Pedral (well-preserved defensive structures), Hillforts (only part of the defensive system is preserved).
- Roman milliary: it is located in front of the town hall, and testifies to the passage of a Roman road through the municipality.

=== Other heritage ===
Highway location marker: several roads of the town hall, such as CP-0602 and CP-1003 keep highway location marker in granite. These were standardized with the Peña Plan in 1939.

== Culture ==
=== Cantares de Reis (Song of Kings) ===
Contest of traditional music of kings, in which crews participate inscribed interpreting a "sing of kings". It will be valued that it is a traditional song and the authenticity of the piece; besides the tuning and the difficulty.

=== Conrobla ===
La Conrobla is a traditional music festival held on the first weekend of July, and the Santiaguiños Folkloric Association has been organizing this event since 2005.

In addition to music, we can find traditional games, dance and music workshops, and samples of local crafts.

=== Fair ===
The first Saturday of every month the fair is celebrated, being able to find in it both agrarian surpluses, as well as clothes, footwear, farm implements ...

== Santiago's road ==
In the Middle Ages, linked to the Monastery of Sobrado dos Monxes, by Boimorto passed the North Road that according to some authors is the oldest Jacobean route and in times more crowded than the French Way. The North Road arrives at the town hall by the place of Corredoiras, in the parish of Ánxeles. From there, the road passes through the parishes of Boimil and Boimorto, where pilgrims have the option of continuing towards Pedrouzo, in the municipality of O Pino, or walking in the direction of Arzúa. The first of the options takes them through the CP-0603, passes through the parishes of Brates and Mercurín, and flows into the place of A Mota, in the town hall of Arzúa. The second option leads pilgrims through the CP-0602, which passes through the parish of Sendelle, and flows into the parish of A Mella, also the town hall of Arzúa.

Through this route of the Santiago's road 19040 pilgrims passed in 2018, which corresponds to 5.82% of the total number of pilgrims who arrived in Santiago de Compostela. From the statistics developed by the Pilgrim's Office, and without taking into account the Jacobean Holy Years (2004 and 2010 in the historical series shown in the figure), it can be estimated that the number of pilgrims passing through the municipality increases in something more than 900 every year. In the following figure you can see the evolution of the number of pilgrims who have passed through the Northern Way since 2004.

== See also ==
List of municipalities in A Coruña
