= Carballedo =

Coordinates: 42.5167°N 7.83333°W

- Municipality
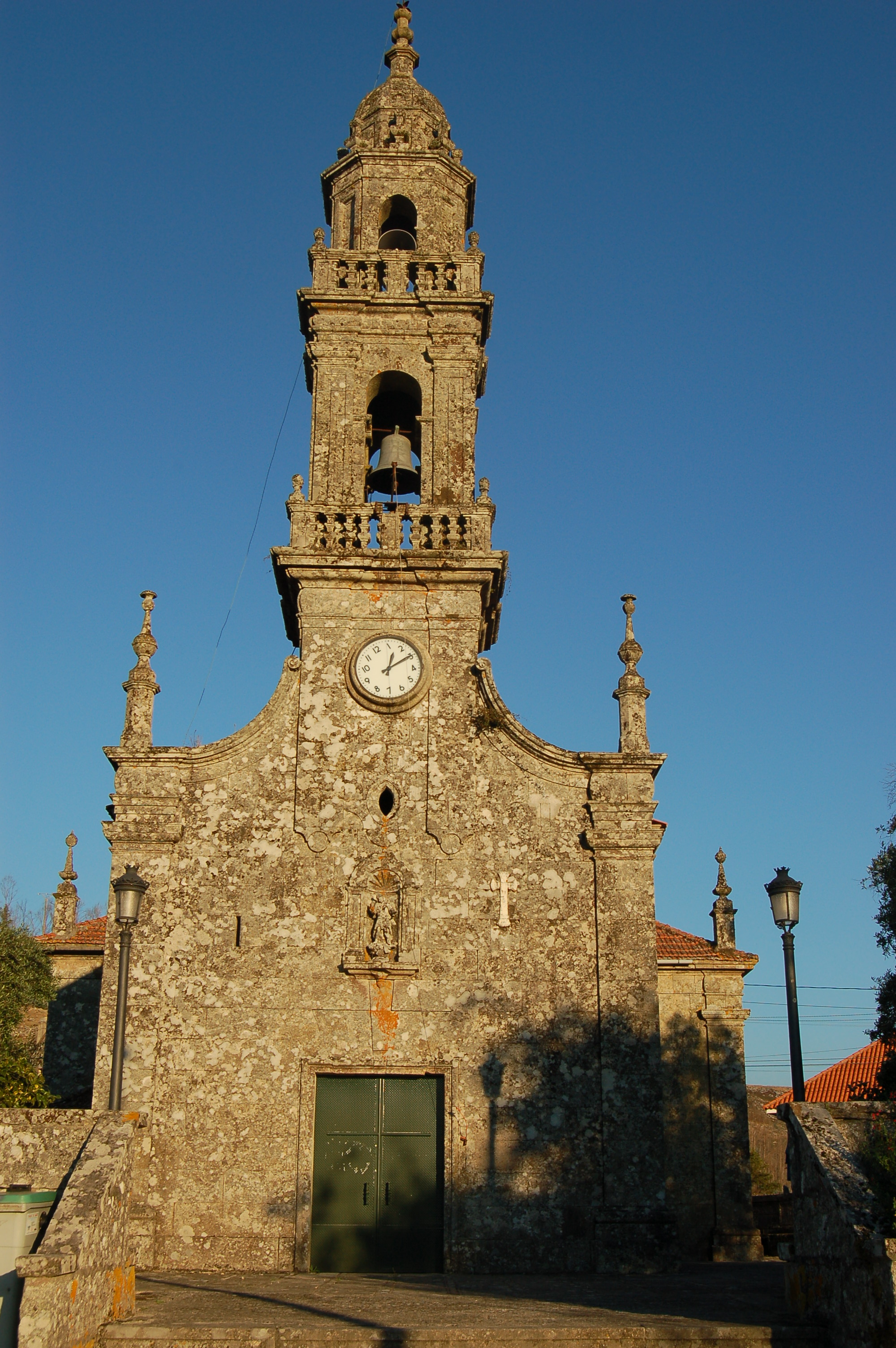
- Saint Michael's church.

- Coat of arms

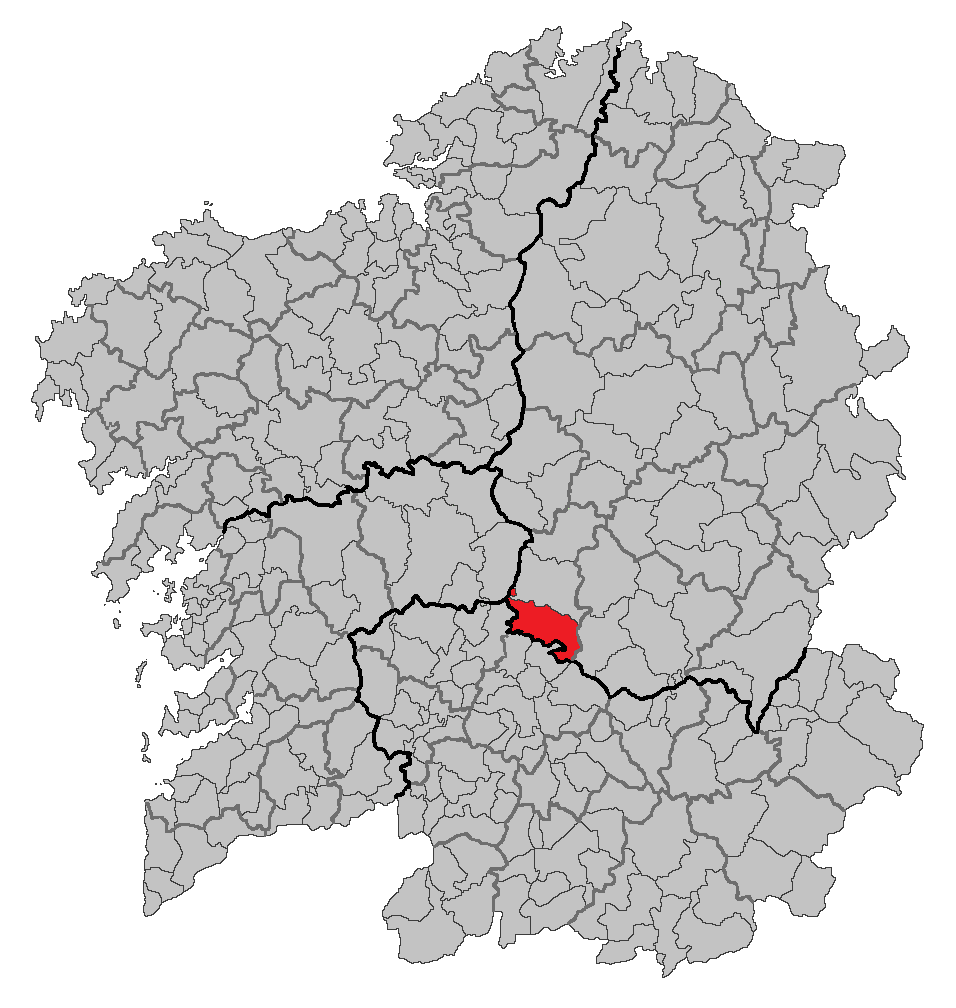
- Location of Carballedo

- Location in Spain
- Country: Spain
- Autonomous community: Galicia
- Province: Lugo
- Comarca: Chantada

Government
  - Alcalde: Julio Manuel Yebra-Pimentel Blanco (PPdeG)

Population (2025-01-01)
  - Total: 1,987
- Demonym(s): carballedés, -a
- Time zone: UTC+1 (CET)
  - Summer (DST): UTC+2 (CEST)
- Postal code: 27530
- Website: Official website

Carballedo (Galician pronunciation: [kaɾβaˈɟeðʊ]) is a municipality in the province of Lugo, in the autonomous community of Galicia, northwestern Spain. It belongs to the comarca of Chantada.
