= Chantada =

- Municipality
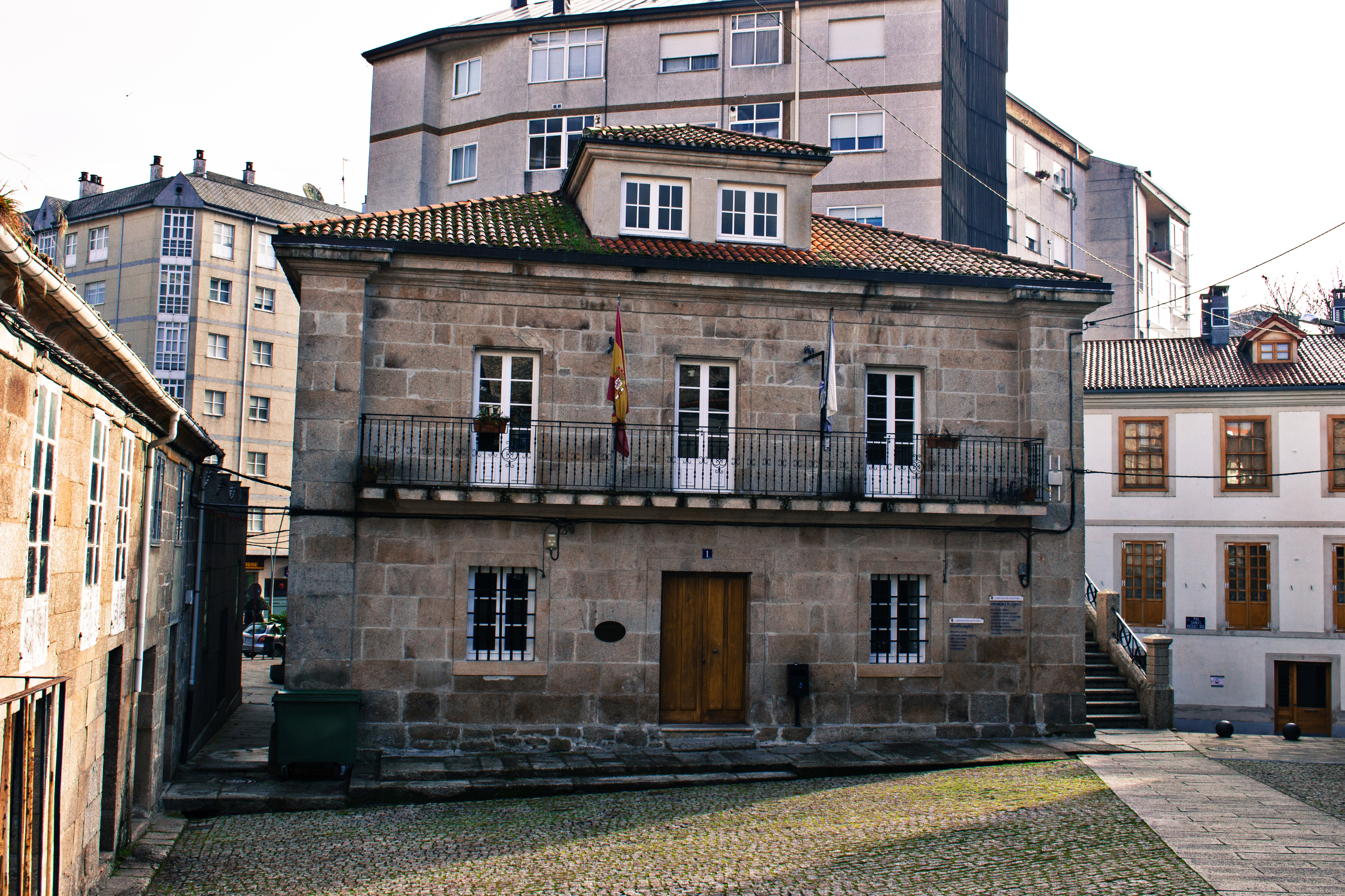

- Coat of arms

- Location in Spain
- Coordinates: 42°37′N 7°46′W
- Country: Spain
- Autonomous community: Galicia
- Province: Lugo
- Comarca: Chantada

Government
  - Mayor: Manuel Lorenzo Varela Rodríguez (People's Party)

Area
  - Total: 176.7 km^{2} (68.2 sq mi)
- Elevation: 36 m (118 ft)

Population (2025-01-01)
  - Total: 8,171
  - Density: 46.24/km^{2} (119.8/sq mi)
- Demonym: Chantadinos
- Time zone: UTC+1 (CET)
  - Summer (DST): UTC+2 (CEST)
- Postal code: 27500
- Website: Official website

Chantada, is a municipality in the province of Lugo, Galicia, Spain.

Chantada is situated on the left bank of the Río Asma, a small right-hand tributary of the Minho river, and on the main road from Ourense, 29 km S. by W., to Lugo, 45 km N. by E. Chantada is the chief town of the fertile region between the Minho and the heights of O Faro, which mark the western border of the province. Despite the lack of railway communication, it has a thriving trade in grain, flax, hemp, and dairy produce.

== History ==
=== Prehistory ===
To study the history of Chantada, we must be go back to the days of the prehistoric castros that had a large presence in the municipality. The castro configuration is still visible on the architecture of the castles of Líncora, Centulle, San Sebastián, Nogueira, Moreda and Castro Candaz. Several monuments were erected over castros in the area, like the monastery of San Salvador de Asma, the fortress of Paderne (Muradelle), the tower of Arcos, the tower of Pereira, the tower of Quinteliña (San Salvador de Asma), the tower of Teixeiro (Nogueira), the tower of Vilaúxe, and Merlán. The anthropomorphic sarcophagi of Fornas are other of the vestiges of the early inhabitants of the municipality.

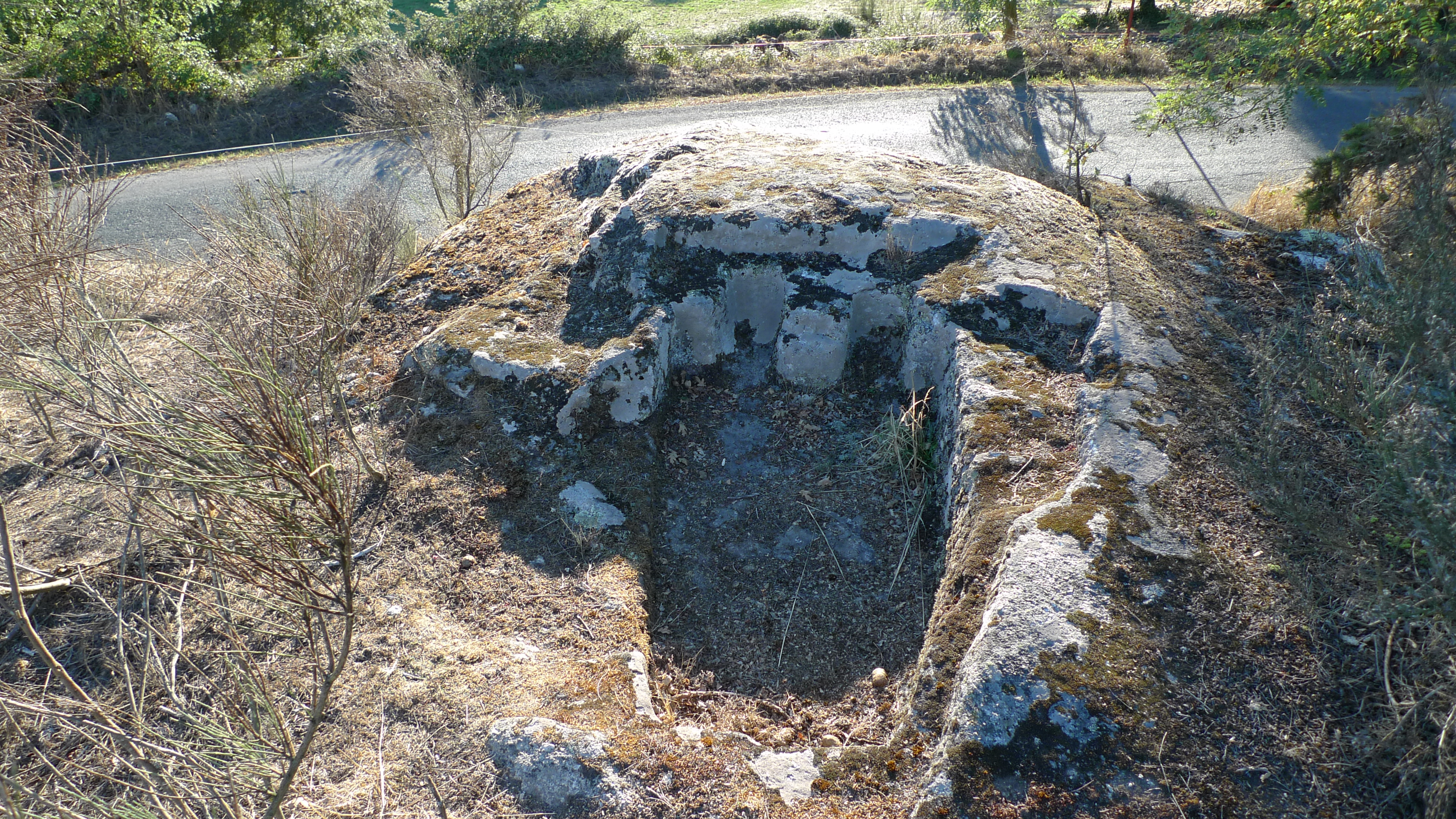
Anthropomorphic sarcophagus in Fornas, Chantada

=== Roman Age ===
Located close to the branch Chaves-Lugo of the Via Bracara Asturicam, that connected the modern cities of Braga, in Portugal, and Astorga, in Castilla y Leon, Chantada has numerous vestiges of the Roman presence in the zone, like the fortified village of Castro Candaz.

According to the documentation belonging to the Camba's house, Castro Candaz was founded by the Roman consul Lucio Cambero. He was related to the "Galician mountain people", who would fight along with the tribe of the Aunonians against two Roman legions sent by Emperor Trajan. After the defeat, Lucio Cambero retires to the fortress.

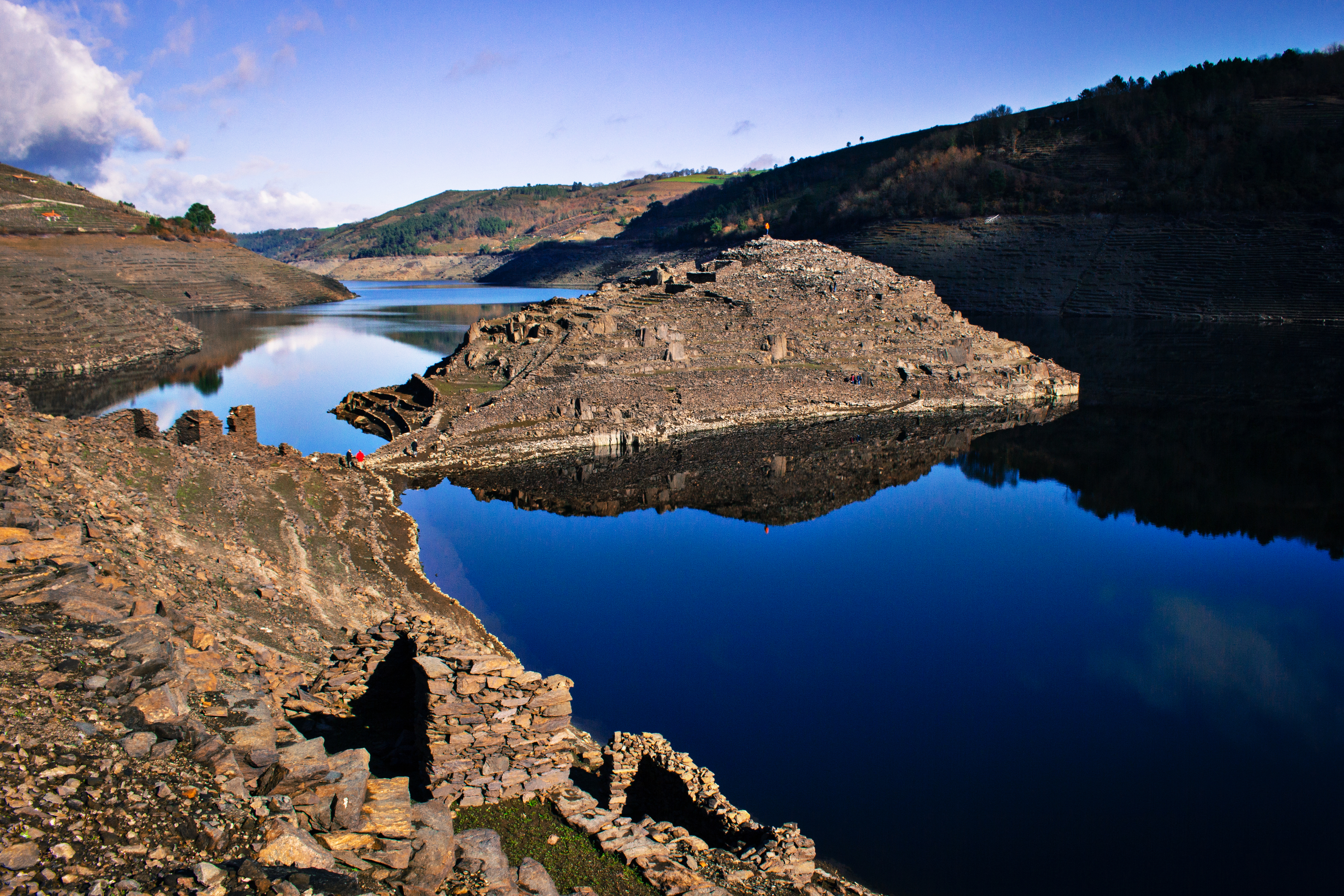
Castro Candaz, Chantada

=== Middle Ages ===
According to Formoso Lamas, during the second strike of Norman invasions, the Vikings overcame Mount Faro and reached Chantada, where a fence was erected (Plantata). After sweeping the town, the Vikings continued advancing and the nobles of the town took refuge in Castro Candaz, guarded by the family of Erice or Eriz. where they received the help of the troops of King Ramiro I of Asturias.

During the Middle Ages possibly Castro was linked to some type of port that had crossed Miño through this band.
