= Antas de Ulla =

- Municipality
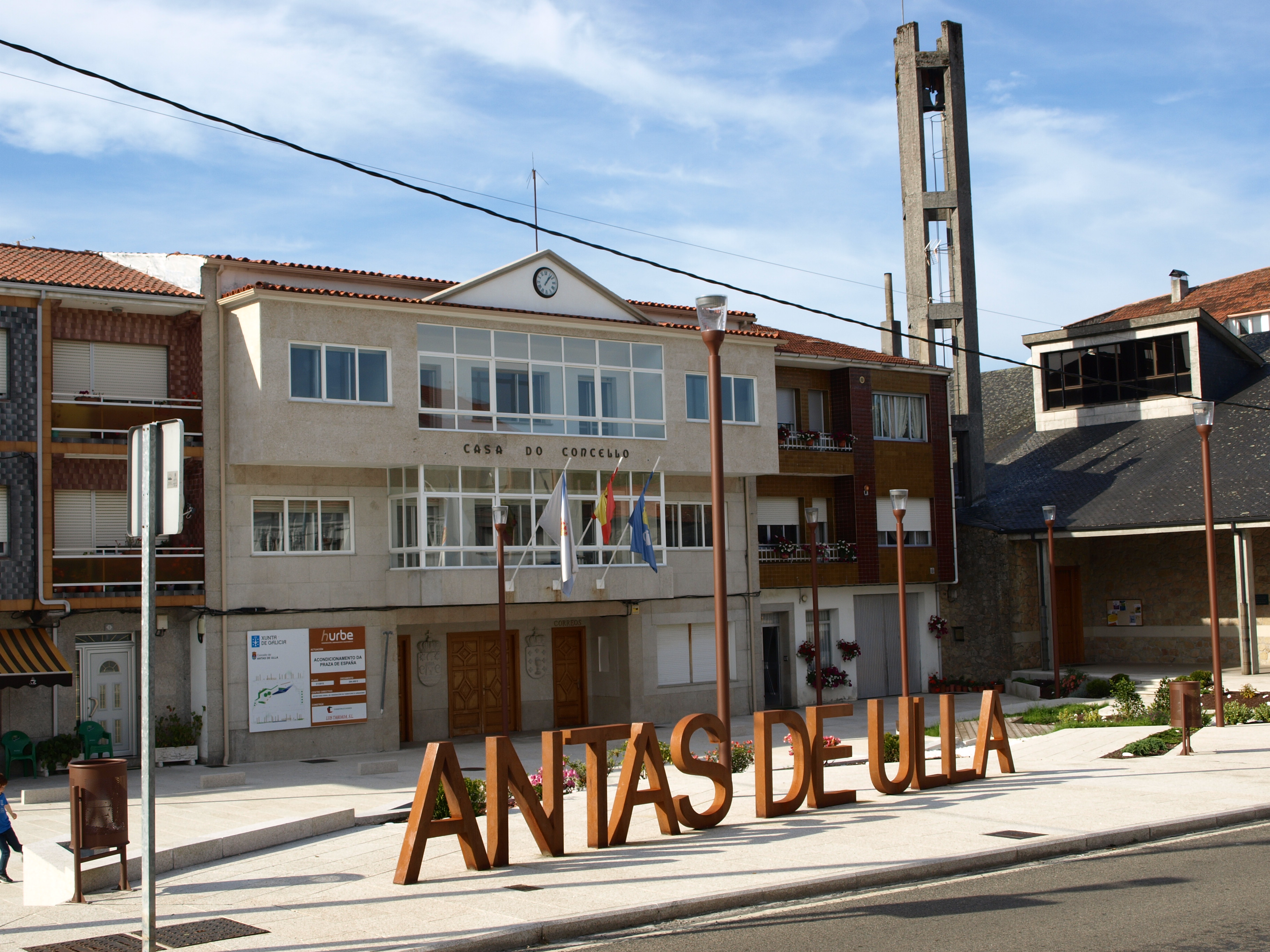

- Flag Coat of arms

- Location within Spain Location within Galicia Location within Province of Lugo
- Coordinates: 42°46′56″N 7°53′23″W
- Country: Spain
- Autonomous community: Galicia
- Province: Lugo
- Comarca: A Ulloa

Area
  - Total: 103.66 km^{2} (40.02 sq mi)
- Elevation: 600 m (2,000 ft)

Population (2025-01-01)
  - Total: 1,822
  - Density: 17.58/km^{2} (45.52/sq mi)
- Postal code: 27570
- Website: www.concellodeantas.org

Antas de Ulla (Galician pronunciation: [ˈantɐz ðɪ ˈuɟɐ]), is a municipality in the province of Lugo, in the autonomous community of Galicia, Spain. It begins in the territory of the Ulla river, which marks the boundaries of the municipality with the neighboring municipalities of Monterroso and Palas de Rey, municipalities with which make up the comarca of A Ulloa.

== Location ==
It is 45 kilometers from the capital of the province, connecting it through the national highway (LU-640) that unites Vegadeo with Pontevedra. The municipality of Antas de Ulla is marked by the Sierra del Monte Farelo (to the south) and the Ulla river, which originates in its territory and runs south–north-west. This configuration provides orographic Antas de Ulla a wealth of hunting and fishing of particular importance, while marking a climate of high rainfall with moderate temperatures. This contributes to the fertility of its arable land suitable and simultaneously for its own rich forest of Galicia interior (forests of chestnut, oak, Galician pine, etc.).

== Economy ==
The municipality's economy is mainly based on agriculture and livestock, with an industry closely linked to the primary sector and services primarily concentrated in the capital city. This capital was known until the mid-twentieth century as Seoane, although the present name of the municipality previously had this name.

One of the attractions in the town for summer is the municipal sports complex Castro de Seoane, equipped with various sports facilities among which are modern pools specifically designed for the enjoyment of children.

The 10th of each month marks the fair or market, with a significant recovery in recent years.

== Gastronomy ==
Particularly notable are the Antas breads, made and kneaded by artisans in wood ovens with wheat flour in the country. Derivatives of this bread include the excellent quality of the pies, with different fillings to the tastes of the consumer, fillings that include meat, cod, tuna and the liscos (bacon bits). Also in gastronomy aspect there is the famous quality of meat, both beef and pork, and cheese, with cheese makers more integrated in the Arzúa-Ulloa origin denomination. Nothing negligible brings about horticultural products obtained by traditional agriculture.

== Festivals ==
- San Xoan (24 June)
- San Cristovo (third Sunday in July)
- Os Remedios (8 September)

== Civil parishes ==
- Agüela (San Mamede)
- Alvidrón (Santa María)
- Amoexa (Santiago)
- Antas (San Xoán)
- Arbol (Note: note that the existence of an interlanguage link here of course does not imply that interlanguage links are not available for the other parishes; interested editors are welcome to find and add them.) (Santalla)
- Arcos (Santa María)
- Areas (Santa Cristina)
- Barreiro (San Cibrao)
- Casa de Naia (Santa María)
- Castro de Amarante (Santo Estevo)
- Cervela (San Miguel)
- Cutián (San Xoán)
- Cibreiro (San Miguel)
- Dorra (Santiago)
- Facha (San Xiao)
- Olveda (Santa María)
- Peibás (San Lourenzo)
- Queixeiro (San Pedro)
- Reboredo (Santiago)
- Rial, O (Santo André)
- San Fiz de Amarante (San Fiz)
- San Martiño de Amarante (San Martiño)
- Santa Mariña de Amarante (Santa Mariña)
- Santiso (Santalla)
- Senande (San Miguel)
- Terra Chá (San Xurxo)
- Vilanuñe (San Salvador)
- Vilapoupre (San Martiño)
