= A Ulloa =

Coordinates: 42°49′N 7°52′W

- Comarca
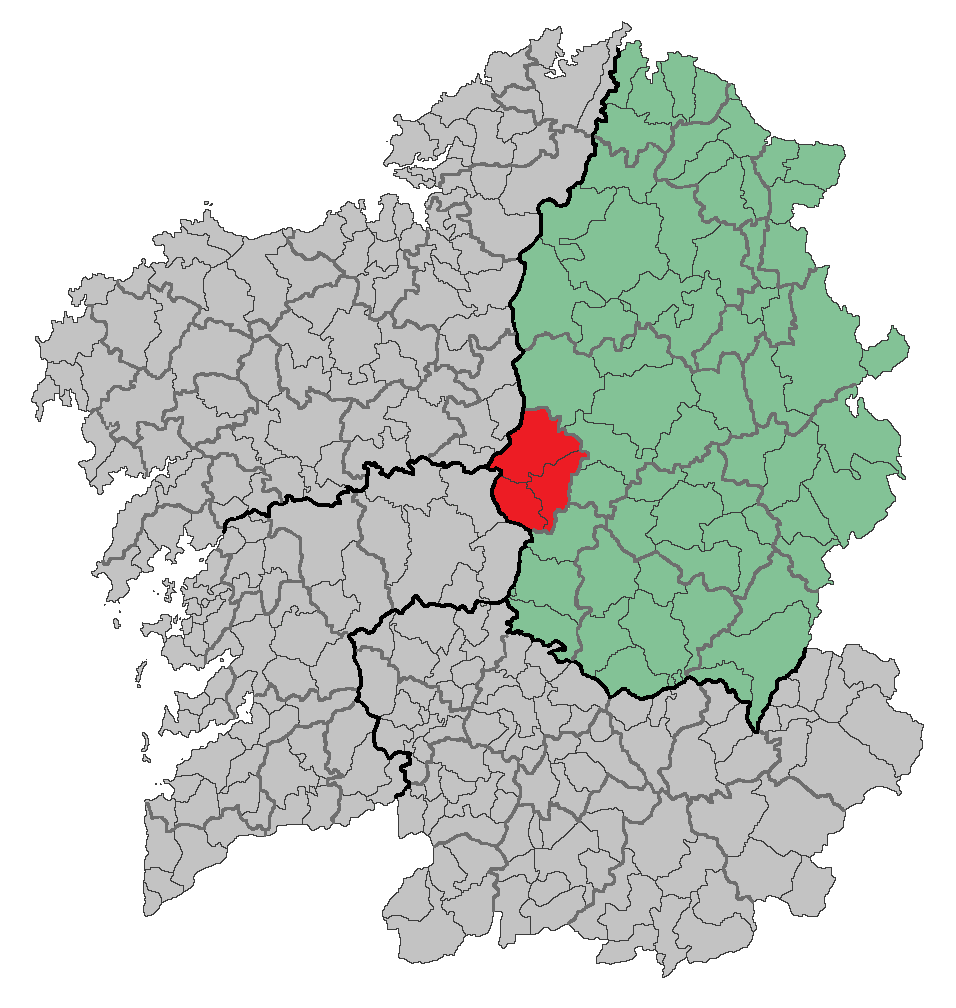
- Country: Spain
- Autonomous community: Galicia
- Province: Lugo
- Capital: Antas de Ulla
- Municipalities: List: Antas de Ulla, Monterroso, Palas de Rei
- Time zone: UTC+1 (CET)
  - Summer (DST): UTC+2 (CEST)

A Ulloa is a comarca in the province of Lugo, Galicia, in northwestern Spain.

== Notable places ==
The municipalities in A Ulloa are Antas de Ulla (capital), Monterroso, and Palas de Rei.

It is home to the Special Zone of Conservation Serra do Careón and of the Fluvial System of Ulla-Deza, which is of the same type.

It is the host of a small part of the Way of Saint James.

== Altri's involvement ==
In 2024, a plan to build a megafabric of cellulose was put forth by the multinational Altri. According to Greenpeace, this would destroy the nature present in A Ulloa.
