= Touro, Spain =

Concello de Touro
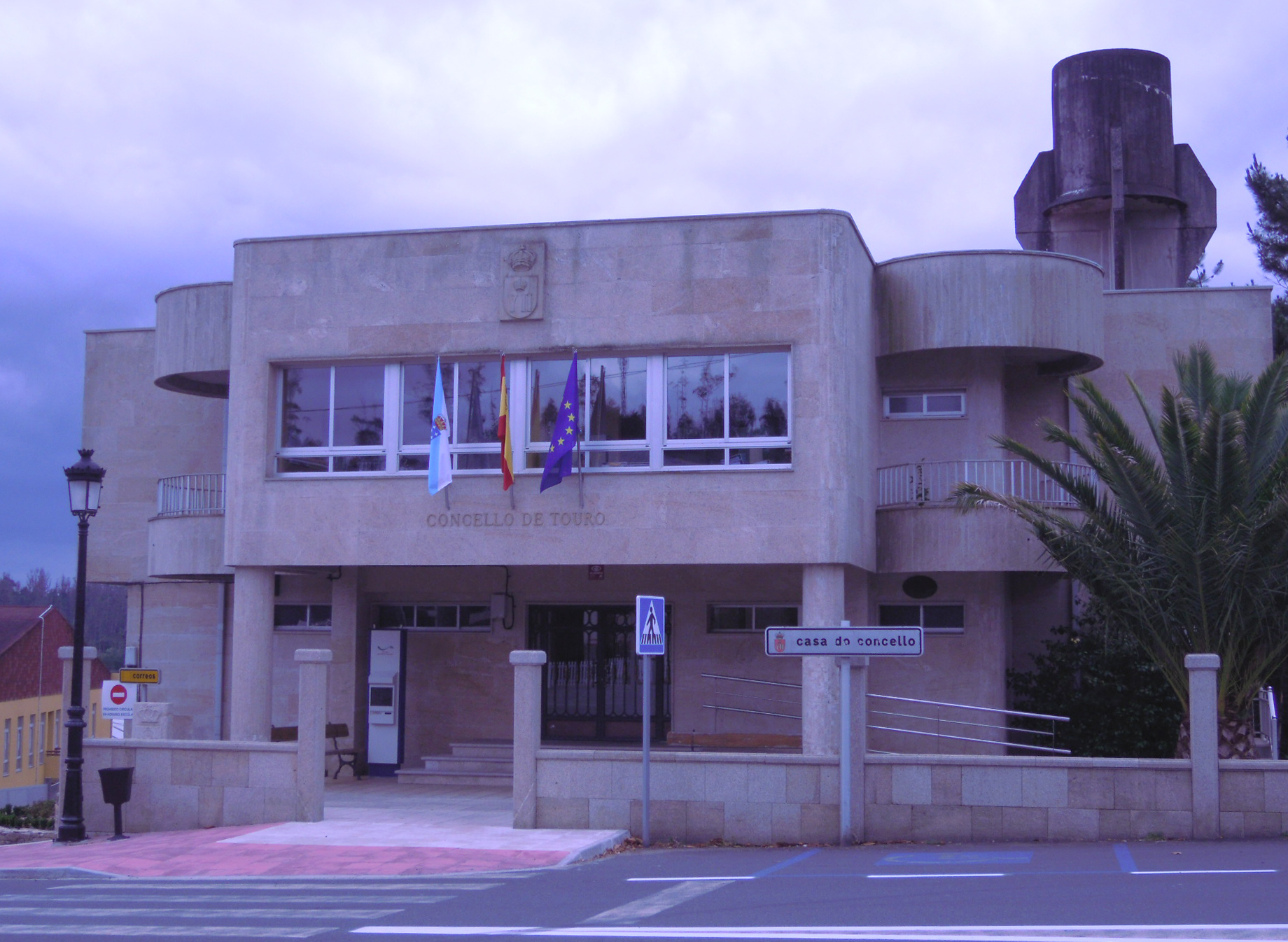

- Coat of arms
- Nickname: Touro
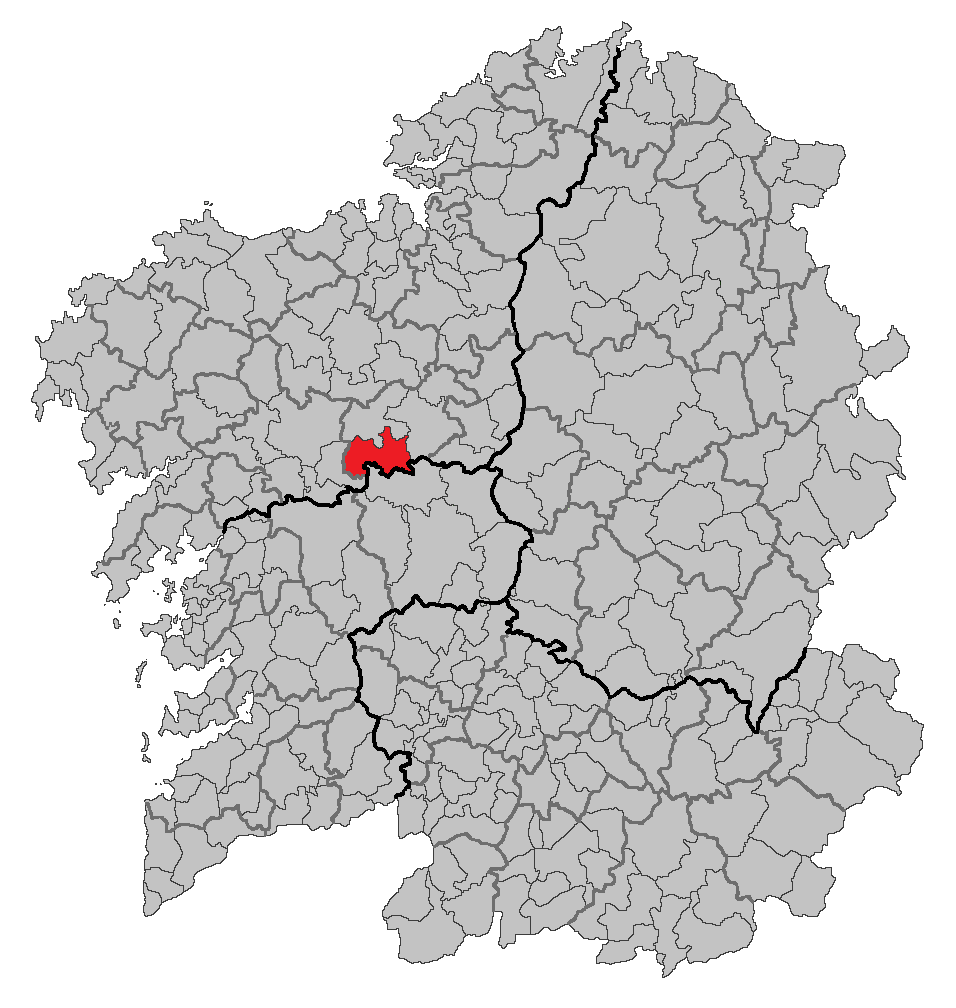
- Location of Touro within Galicia

- Location of Touro in Spain Concello de Touro (Galicia)
- Coordinates: 42°52′N 8°17′W
- Spain: Spain
- Autonomous Community: Galicia
- Province: A Coruña
- Comarca: Arzúa

Government
  - Alcalde (Mayor): Roberto Castro (Movemento Veiñal de Touro)

Area
  - Total: 115.34 km^{2} (44.53 sq mi)

Population (2024)
  - Total: 3,382
  - Density: 29.32/km^{2} (75.94/sq mi)
- Time zone: UTC+1 (CET)
  - Summer (DST): UTC+2 (CEST)
- Parroquias: 19
- Website: www.concellodetouro.com

Touro is a municipality of northwestern Spain in the province of A Coruña, in the autonomous community of Galicia. It has a population of 3,382 inhabitants as of 2024. Touro has an area of 115.34 km^{2}.

== See also ==
List of municipalities in A Coruña
