= Arzúa =

Municipality in Galicia, Spain

Coordinates: 42°53′N 8°11′W

- municipality
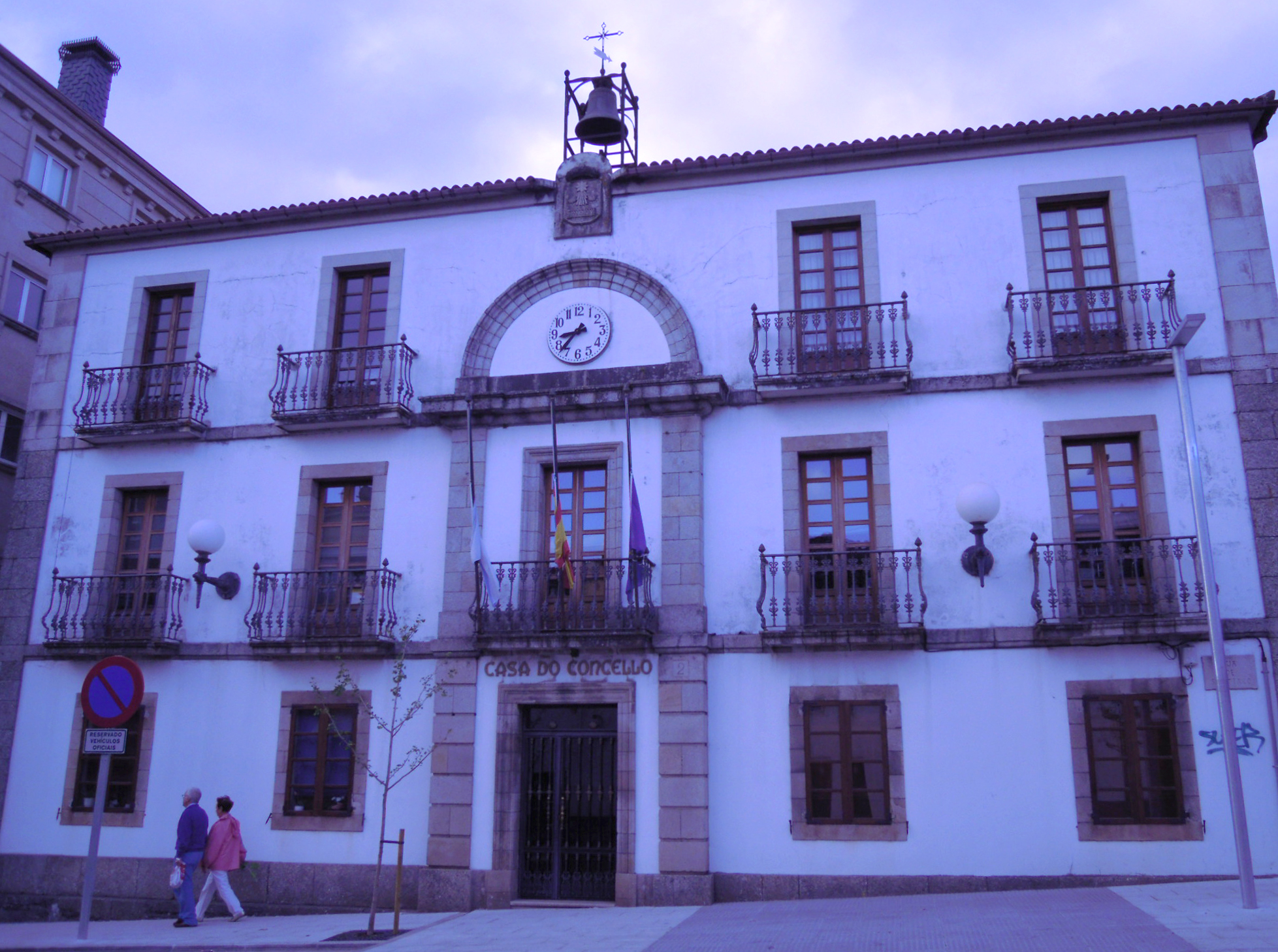
- Town hall

- Coat of arms

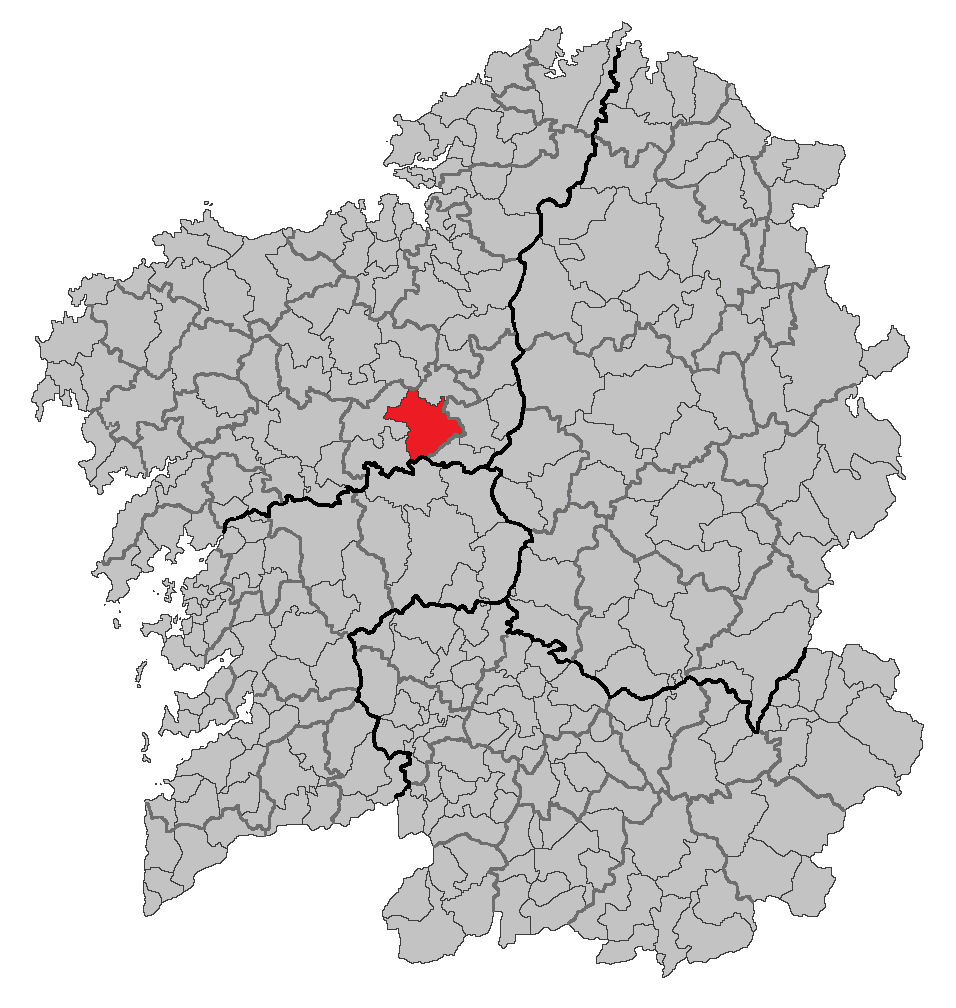
- Location of Arzúa within Galicia
- Parroquias: Santa María de Arzúa, Santiago de Arzúa, Boente, Brandeso, Branzá, Burres, Calvos de Sobrecamiño, O Campo, Castañeda, Dodro, Dombodán, Figueiroa, Lema, Maroxo, A Mella, Oíns, Pantiñobre, Rendal, Tronceda, Viladavil, Vilantime & Viñós

Area
  - Total: 155.89 km^{2} (60.19 sq mi)

Population (2024)
  - Total: 5,887
  - Density: 37.76/km^{2} (97.81/sq mi)
- Time zone: UTC+1 (CET)
  - Summer (DST): UTC+2 (CEST)
- Website: Concello de Arzúa

Arzúa (Galician pronunciation: [aɾˈzu.a], Spanish pronunciation: [aɾˈθu.a]) is a municipality in the province of A Coruña, in the autonomous community of Galicia, northwestern Spain. It has an area of 155.89 km^{2}, a population of 5,887 (2024 estimate), and a population density of 37.76 people/km^{2}. It is one of the Galician municipalities with the most cows per capita.

Although the region has long been settled, even pre-dating Roman occupation, the current population of the town are mostly of Basque extraction.

For many pilgrims, the village is the last stopping point before the last day's trek into Santiago de Compostela. The French Way and the Northern Way (Camino del Norte) of the Camino de Santiago meet in Arzúa before arriving in Santiago.

== Demographics ==
Historical population
Year	Pop.	±%
1900	9,036	—
1930	8,743	−3.2%
1950	10,754	+23.0%
1981	7,377	−31.4%
2012	6,315	−14.4%
2024	5,887	−6.8%
Source: Article in Spanish and Galician

== Cuisine ==
The municipalities of Arzúa and A Ulloa are notable for being the location of origin of Arzúa-Ulloa cheese, which holds Protected Designation of Origin (PDO) status.

== See also ==
- List of municipalities in A Coruña
